= Iamsu! discography =

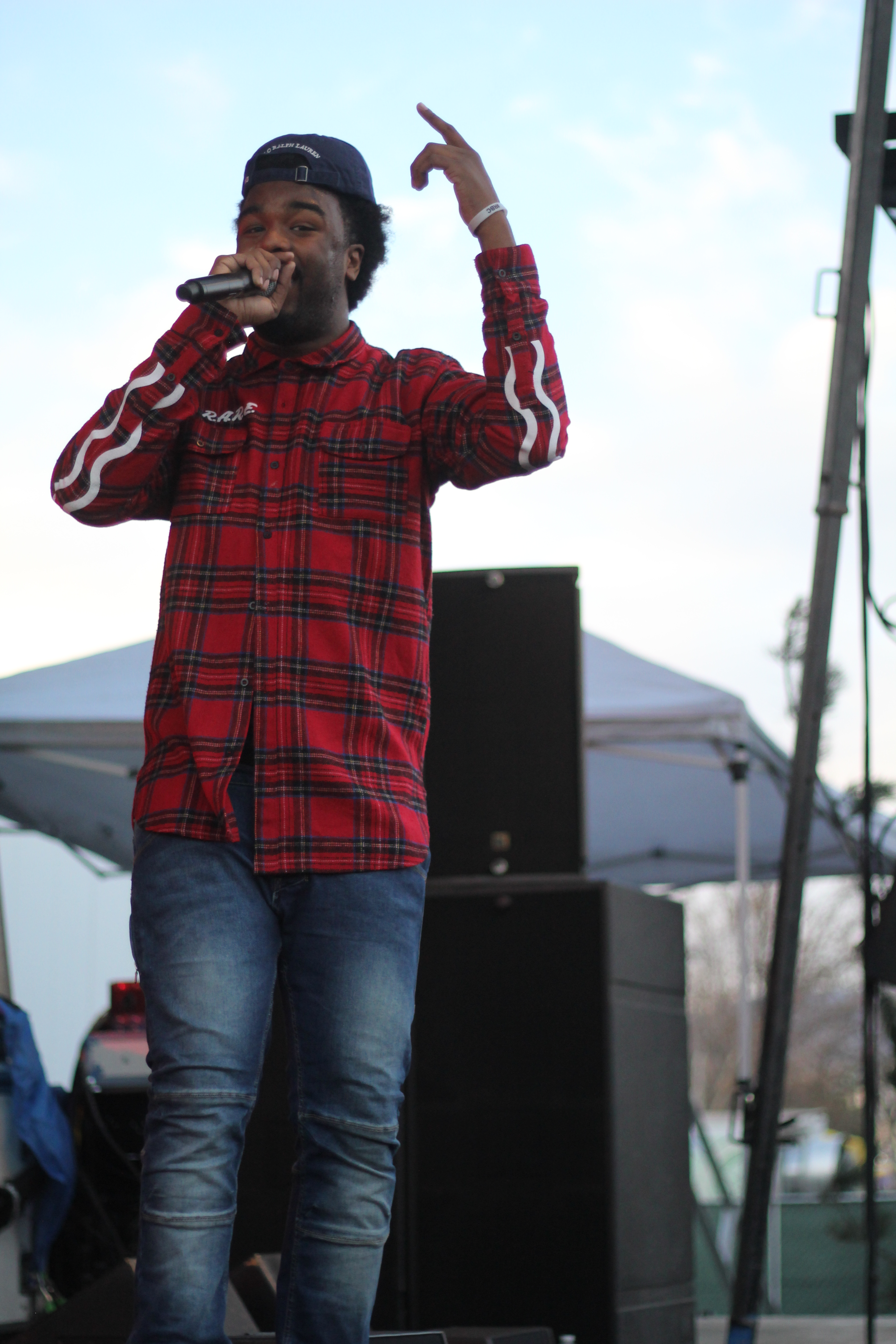
- Iamsu in 2014
- Studio albums: 5
- Singles: 25
- Mixtapes: 9

American rapper Iamsu! has released five studio albums, nine mixtapes and 25 singles (including 18 as a featured artist).

== Albums ==
=== Studio albums ===
List of albums, with selected information
Title	Album details
Sincerely Yours	Released: May 13, 2014; Label: HBK Gang, Alternative Distribution Alliance; Formats: CD, digital download
Kilt 3	Released: March 25, 2016; Label: HBK Gang, Eyes On Me; Formats: CD, digital download
06 Solara	Released: September 11, 2018; Label: HBK Gang, Eyes On Me, Alternative Distribution Alliance; Formats: CD, digital download
Blessed	Released: December 6, 2018; Label: HBK Gang, All Eyes On Me; Formats: CD, digital download
Boss Up V	Released: November 13, 2019; Label: HBK Gang, All Eyes On Me; Formats: CD, digital download

=== EPs ===
List of mixtapes, with year released
Title	Album details
Iamsummer (Live)	Released: September 8, 2016; Label: All Eyes On Me; Formats: digital download
Iamsu	Released: June 27, 2017; Label: All Eyes On Me; Formats: digital download
Next of Kin (with Skipper)	Released: May 24, 2019; Label: Prezidential Music, All Eyes On Me; Formats: digital download
6 Piece Chicken Nugget (with Kool John)	Released: October 12, 2019; Label: $hmoplife Entertainment, All Eyes On Me; Formats: digital download
Eyes on Me	Released: April 29, 2020; Label: All Eyes On Me; Formats: digital download
California	Released: October 8, 2021; Label: All Eyes On Me; Formats: digital download
Sudi	Released: February 14, 2022; Label: All Eyes On Me; Formats: digital download
A Real Boy Story	Released: April 16, 2022; Label: All Eyes On Me; Formats: digital download
Out the Blue	Released: December 30, 2022; Label: All Eyes On Me; Formats: digital download

=== Mixtapes ===
List of mixtapes
Title	Album details
Su! The Right Thing	Released: July 4, 2010; Label: HBK Gang; Format: Digital download
Young California	Released: May 7, 2011; Label: HBK Gang; Format: Digital download
Kilt	Released: May 7, 2012; Label: HBK Gang; Format: Digital download
Stoopid (with Jay Ant)	Released: October 30, 2012; Label: HBK Gang; Format: Digital download
$uzy 6 $peed	Released: November 10, 2012; Label: HBK Gang; Format: Digital download
Million Dollar Afro (with Problem)	Released: April 10, 2013; Label: HBK Gang, Diamond Lane; Format: Digital download
Kilt II	Released: June 6, 2013; Label: HBK Gang; Format: Digital download
Gang Forever (with HBK Gang)	Released: August 12, 2013; Label: HBK Gang; Format: Digital download
Eyes on Me	Released: February 24, 2015; Label: HBK Gang; Format: Digital download
6 Speed	Released: August 23, 2016; Label: HBK Gang; Format: Digital download, streaming
Boss Up	Released: February 3, 2017; Label: HBK Gang, All Eyes On Me; Format: Digital download, streaming

== Singles ==
=== As lead artist ===
List of singles as lead performer, with selected chart positions, showing year released and album name
Title	Year	Peak chart positions	Album
Title	Year	US R&B	Album
"Let Go" (featuring Tank)	2013	—	Kilt 2
"Hipster Girls"	2013	—	Kilt 2
"Only That Real" (featuring 2 Chainz and Sage the Gemini)	2014	56	Sincerely Yours
"I Love My Squad"	2014	—	Sincerely Yours
"Up All Night" (featuring HBK CJ)	2016	—	Kilt 3
"By My Side"	2016	—	Boss Up
"Bo$$ Up"	2016	—	Boss Up
"The Way It Go"	2017	—	Boss Up
"—" denotes a recording that did not chart or was not released in that territory.

=== As featured artist ===
List of singles as featured performer, with selected chart positions, showing year released and album name
Title	Year	Peak chart positions			Certifications	Album
Title	Year	US	US R&B	US Rap	Certifications	Album
"Up!" (LoveRance featuring Iamsu!, Skipper and 50 Cent)	2011	46	2	2		—N/a
"Make You Say" (Kickflip featuring Iamsu!)	2012	—	—	—		—N/a
"Function" (E-40 featuring Problem, Iamsu! and YG)	2012	121	62	22		The Block Brochure: Welcome to the Soil 2
"Who Booty" (Jonn Hart featuring Iamsu!)	2012	66	20	—		Heart 2 Hart
"Gas Pedal" (Sage the Gemini featuring Iamsu!)	2013	29	6	4	RIAA: 3× Platinum	Remember Me
"Do" (D&D featuring Iamsu!)	2013	—	—	—		—N/a
"Step On the Gas" (Fly Street Gang featuring Iamsu! and Problem)	2013	—	—	—		—N/a
"Can't Trust Deez" (Young Sam featuring Iamsu and AD)	2013	—	—	—		—N/a
"Work" (Flip Major featuring Iamsu!)	2013	—	—	—		—N/a
"Hoes Into Housewives" (ST Spittin featuring Iamsu! and D-Lo)	2013	—	—	—		—N/a
"Do My Own Thang" (Show Banga featuring Iamsu!, CJ and P-Lo)	2013	—	—	—		—N/a
"Pick a Winner" (Nova Boy featuring Iamsu! and Nonywopz)	2013	—	—	—		—N/a
"Show Up" (Kafani featuring Iamsu!, Jonn Hart and Sage the Gemini)	2013	—	—	—		—N/a
"Ride on It" (Armani DePaul featuring Iamsu!, Jonn Hart, Kool John and Rayven Justice)	2013	—	—	—		—N/a
"Don't Play" (Neiman featuring Iamsu!)	2013	—	—	—		—N/a
"Shut It Down" (Driicky Graham featuring Iamsu!)	2013	—	—	—		—N/a
"My Baby" (Zendaya featuring Ty Dolla Sign, Bobby Brackins and Iamsu!)	2014	—	—	—		—N/a
"Backflip" (Casey Veggies featuring YG and Iamsu!)	2014	—	—	—		Live & Grow
"100" (Travis Barker featuring Iamsu!, Ty Dolla Sign, Kid Ink and Tyga)	2015	—	—	—		TBA
"—" denotes a recording that did not chart or was not released in that territory.

== Other charted song ==
Non-single song, with chart position, showing year released and album name
Title	Year	Peak chart position	Album
Title	Year	US R&B	Album
"Bout Me" (Wiz Khalifa featuring Problem and Iamsu!)	2012	52	O.N.I.F.C.

== Guest appearances ==
List of non-single guest appearances, with other performing artists, showing year released and album name
Title	Year	Other artist(s)	Album
"Up"	2011	YG, TeeCee4800	Just Re'd Uptc
"Hit the Face"	2011	Young L	Praktica
"Bout Me"	2012	Wiz Khalifa, Problem	O.N.I.F.C.
"Livin"	2013	2 Chainz	B.O.A.T.S. II: Me Time
"Smack"	2013	Audio Push, Ty Dolla Sign	Come As You Are
"Tonight is the Night"	2013	Mistah F.A.B., Mickey Shiloh	Hella Ratchet
"On Citas"	2013	Mistah F.A.B., Keak da Sneak	Hella Ratchet
"Fuck Her So Long"	2013	Mistah F.A.B., Problem	Hella Ratchet
"Bossman"	2013	Berner, P-Lo	Urban Farmer
"Harder Way"	2013	Berner	Urban Farmer
"All Y'all"	2013	E-40, Kool John	The Block Brochure: Welcome to the Soil 5
"Penetrate"	2013	E-40, Sage the Gemini, Eric Statz	The Block Brochure: Welcome to the Soil 6
"Pull Up"	2014	L.A. Leakers, Sage the Gemini, Kid Ink	—N/a
"Go Somewhere"	2014	Sage the Gemini	Remember Me
"Nothing to Me"	2014	Sage the Gemini	Remember Me
"Mad at Me"	2014	Sage the Gemini, Jay Ant	Remember Me
"Go Outside"	2014	Domo Genesis	Under the Influence 2
"Act a Fool"	2014	Kehlani	Cloud 19
"Can't Tell Me"	2014	DJ Mustard, AkaFrank	10 Summers
"Bussin'"	2014	Sir Michael Rocks, Casey Veggies	Banco
"Viral"	2015	Eric Bellinger	Cuffing Season
"No Talking"	2015	RJ, Skeme	O.M.M.I.O. 2
"Worth It"	2015	Tinashe	Amethyst
"Running"	2015	J. Stalin, Rayven Justice	Tears of Joy
"Real Niggaz Only"	2015	J. Stalin, Riff Raff	Tears of Joy
"Make a Living"	2016	Philthy Rich	Real Niggas Back in Style
"Up Until Then"	2016	Mistah F.A.B., Boosie Badazz	Son of a Pimp, Pt. 2
"Finna Do"	2016	Mistah F.A.B., Idaho J Doe	Son of a Pimp, Pt. 2
"Been Havin' Money"	2016	J. Stalin, Philthy Rich	On Behalf of the Streets 2
"Way Up"	2016	AD, Sorry Jaynari	By the Way
"On My Hustle"	2016	The Mekanix, Iesha Brooks, Keak da Sneak, J. Stalin	Under the Hood
"No Rest (West Coast)"	2016	Ymtk	All the Right Places
"Pull Up"	2016	Rayven Justice, Baeza	Do It Justice
"My Eyes"	2017	Mozzy	Fake Famous
"Still Fine"	2017	P-Lo, Kool John	More Than Anything
"Living Good (R.I.P. Jen)"	2017	Problem, Nipsey Hussle	Selfish
"Still Stackin'"	2018-20	Larry June	Early Bird
"Famous"	2018-20	Mozzy, Dej Loaf, Yo Gotti	Gangland Landlord
"Somuthafuckinloud"	2018-20	Mistah F.A.B., E-40	Year 2006
"Thangs"	2018-20	Problem, Wiz Khalifa	S2
"Day Ones Only"	2018-20	Show Banga	Da Glow Up
"Way Too Much"	2018-20	Show Banga, Sage the Gemini	Da Glow Up
"What You Mean"	2018-20	D-Lo, Lil Yee	Asiyah
"Every Weekend"	2018-20	Jonn Hart, Compton Menace, Too $hort	Cross My Heart
"Neva Hated"	2018-20	Philthy Rich	Big 58
"Thou Wow"	2018-20	E-40	Practice Makes Paper
"Big Racks"	2018-20	Casey Veggies	Organic
"CEO"	2018-20	Skipper	Beast Mode, Vol. 2
"My Pride"	2018-20	ZayBang	Selfish
