= Sage the Gemini discography =

Hip hop recording artist discography

- Studio albums: 1
- EPs: 1
- Singles: 33
- Mixtapes: 1

The discography of American rapper Sage the Gemini consists of released one studio album, one extended play (EP), one mixtape and 33 singles (including 21 as a featured artist).

== Albums ==
=== Studio albums ===
List of albums, with selected chart positions and sales figures
Title	Album details	Peak chart positions			Certifications
Title	Album details	US	US R&B/HH	US Rap	Certifications
Remember Me	Released: March 25, 2014; Label: Global Gemini, HBK Gang, EMPIRE, Republic; Formats: CD, digital download	47	11	5	RIAA: Gold

=== Mixtapes ===
List of mixtapes, with selected details
Title	Details
Morse Code	Released: July 21, 2017; Label: Global Gemini, Atlantic; Format: Digital download

== EPs ==
List of extended plays, with selected information
Title	EP details	Peak chart positions	
Title	EP details	US R&B/ HH	US Rap
Gas Pedal EP	Released: September 10, 2013; Label: Global Gemini, Republic; Format: digital download	29	16

== Singles ==
=== As lead artist ===
List of singles as lead artist, with selected chart positions and certifications, showing year released and album name
Title	Year	Peak chart positions										Certifications	Album
Title	Year	US	US R&B/HH	US Rap	AUS	CAN	DEN	GER	NZ	SWE	UK	Certifications	Album
"Red Nose"	2013	52	14	10	—	—	—	—	—	—	—	RIAA: 2× Platinum; RMNZ: Gold	Gas Pedal EP and Remember Me
"Gas Pedal" (featuring Iamsu! and also remix featuring Justin Bieber)	2013	29	6	4	—	59	—	—	—	—	100	RIAA: 3× Platinum; RMNZ: Platinum	Gas Pedal EP and Remember Me
"Swerve"	2013	—	—	—	—	—	—	—	—	—	—		Gas Pedal EP
"College Drop" (featuring Kool John)	2013	—	— (Note: "College Drop" did not enter the Billboard Hot R&B/Hip-Hop Songs chart, but peaked at number seven on the Bubbling Under R&B/Hip-Hop Singles chart.)	—	—	—	—	—	—	—	—		Remember Me
"Down On Your Luck" (featuring August Alsina)	2014	—	—	—	—	—	—	—	—	—	—		Remember Me
"Mack Down" (featuring Mistah F.A.B.)	2014	—	—	—	—	—	—	—	—	—	—		Gas Pedal EP
"Don't You"	2015	—	—	—	—	—	—	—	—	—	—		Gas Pedal EP and Remember Me
"Guantanamera" (featuring Trey Songz)	2015	—	—	—	—	—	—	—	—	—	—		Non-album singles
"Good Thing" (featuring Nick Jonas)	2015	75	—	—	—	—	—	—	—	—	—		Non-album singles
"Now and Later"	2016	93	36	23	19	45	28	6	12	12	17	RIAA: Gold; ARIA: Platinum; BPI: Silver; IFPI DEN: Gold; MC: Platinum; RMNZ: Platinum	Morse Code
"Pilot"	2017	—	—	—	—	—	—	—	—	—	—		Morse Code
"Reverse"	2017	—	—	—	—	—	—	—	—	—	—		Morse Code
"Pull Over" (featuring Trina)	2018	—	—	—	—	—	—	—	—	—	—		Non-album singles
"No Ex's" (featuring 03 Greedo)	2018	—	—	—	—	—	—	—	—	—	—		Non-album singles
"Boujee"	2018	—	—	—	—	—	—	—	—	—	—		Non-album singles
"4G"	2018	—	—	—	—	—	—	—	—	—	—		Non-album singles
"Hoop Dreams" (featuring Yhung T.O.)	2018	—	—	—	—	—	—	—	—	—	—		Non-album singles
"Buss It" (featuring Chris Brown)	2018	—	—	—	—	—	—	—	— (Note: "Buss It" did not enter the NZ Top 40 Singles Chart, but peaked at number 40 on the NZ Hot Singles Chart.)	—	—		Non-album singles
"It Ain't My Fault"	2018	—	—	—	—	—	—	—	—	—	—		Non-album singles
"Big Numbers"	2019	—	—	—	—	—	—	—	—	—	—		Madden NFL 20
"Humble"	2020	—	—	—	—	—	—	—	—	—	—		Non-album singles
"Baby" (with Chris Brown)	2021	—	—	—	—	—	—	—	—	—	—		Non-album singles
"Cereal Milk"	2021	—	—	—	—	—	—	—	—	—	—		Non-album singles
"Go Head"	2025	—	—	—	—	—	—	—	—	—	—		Non-album singles
"—" denotes a recording that did not chart or was not released in that territory.

=== As featured artist ===
List of singles as featured artist, with selected chart positions and certifications, showing year released and album name
Title	Year	Peak chart positions			Certifications	Album
Title	Year	US	US R&B/HH	US Rap	Certifications	Album
"Kiss It" (Dev featuring Sage the Gemini)	2013	110	—	46		Non-album singles
"Back That A** Up" (JAYnFRESH featuring D-LO and Sage the Gemini)	2013	—	—	—		Non-album singles
"Nothing for Free" (Shill Mac featuring Sage the Gemini)	2013	—	—	—		Filth City Alumni EP
"Panoramic" (Dmac featuring Sage the Gemini and Show Banga)	2013	—	—	—		Panoramic EP
"What You Got? (Show Banga featuring Sage the Gemini)	2013	—	—	—		Don't Stop Votin (Deluxe Edition)
"Only That Real" (Iamsu! featuring 2 Chainz and Sage the Gemini)	2014	—	56	—		Sincerely Yours
"2AM" (Adrian Marcel featuring Sage the Gemini)	2014	104	29	—	RMNZ: Platinum	Non-album single
"G.D.F.R." (Flo Rida featuring Sage the Gemini and Lookas)	2014	8	3	2	RIAA: 4× Platinum; RMNZ: 2× Platinum	My House
"I Been That" (Show Banga featuring Sage the Gemini)	2014	—	—	—		Mayor 4 Life
"Pull Up" (L.A. Leakers featuring Sage the Gemini, Kid Ink and Iamsu!)	2014	—	—	—		Non-album singles
"Booty Had Me Like (Woah) [Remix]" (Round2Crew featuring Sage the Gemini)	2014	—	—	—		Non-album singles
"Drop It" (Wonder Broz featuring Sage the Gemini)	2014	—	—	—		Non-album singles
"Jump" (Derek King featuring Kirko Bangz and Sage the Gemini)	2014	—	—	—		Non-album singles
"Friday Night" (Teenear featuring Sage the Gemini)	2015	—	—	—		Non-album singles
"Nobody (Remix)" (Anjali World featuring Sage the Gemini and Tyga)	2015	—	—	—		Brave New World EP
"YAK (You Already Know)" (Da Brat featuring Sage the Gemini and Eric Bellinger)	2015	—	—	—		Non-album singles
"Foreign" (Berner featuring Sage the Gemini, Keak da Sneak and Snow Tha Product)	2015	—	—	—		Non-album singles
"Teasin'" (Derek King featuring Sage the Gemini)	2015	—	—	—		Non-album singles
"#BDAY" (Tank featuring Chris Brown, Siya and Sage the Gemini)	2016	—	—	—		Sex, Love, & Pain II
"Game Time" (Flo Rida featuring Sage the Gemini)	2017	—	—	—		Non-album singles
"Do It Like Me (Icy Feet)" (TCTS featuring Sage the Gemini and Kelis)	2017	—	—	—		Non-album singles
"Snack" (Flo Rida featuring E-40 and Sage the Gemini)	2019	—	—	—		Non-album singles
"—" denotes a recording that did not chart or was not released in that territory.

== Guest appearances ==
List of non-single guest appearances, with other performing artists, showing year released and album name
Title	Year	Other artist(s)	Album
"Get Ghost"	2012	Starting Six, Clyde Carson, DJ 112	Wear a Helmet
"Marco Polo"	2012	Starting Six, Bobby Brackins	Wear a Helmet
"Penetrate"	2013	E-40, Eric Statz, Iamsu!	The Block Brochure: Welcome to the Soil 6
"Return of the Mac"	2013	Iamsu!, P-Lo	Kilt II
"Double Entendre"	2014	Eric Bellinger	The Rebirth
"Top Down"	2014	Smoovie Baby	Stay True
"Loyal" (Remix)	2014	Chris Brown, O.T. Genasis, Troy Ave	none
"Anyway"	2014	DJ Carisma, Tory Lanez, Eric Bellinger, Mishon	none
"Talk Dirty" (Remix)	2014	Jason Derulo, 2 Chainz	Talk Dirty
"Geronimo"	2014	Clinton Sparks, T-Pain, Ty Dolla Sign	ICONoclast
"Throw It Back"	2014	League of Starz, Marko Pen	none
"Touchdown"	2014	Mishon	none
"Gasoline"	2014	Jordin Sparks	none
"Light and Shade"	2014	Guy Sebastian	Madness
"Know Your Name"	2014	Trevor Jackson	none
"Payback"	2014	Juicy J, Kevin Gates, Future	Furious 7
"Somebody" (Remix)	2014	Natalie La Rose, Jeremih, Fetty Wap, Troy Ave	none
"Roll Up"	2014	Zyme & Deptronic	Ninja Robot Future – EP
"Player For Life"	2014	P-Lo, Iamsu!	MBMGC 2 (Deluxe Edition)
"TBT"	2014	Kool John, Show Banga	Shmop City
"Aww Sh*t"	2015	Show Banga, P-Lo	Mayor 4 Life
"Bang That"	2015	JAYnFRESH	Cattin Off EP
"Something New"	2016	Iamsu!, YMTK	Kilt 3
"Don't Get Much Better"	2017	Jeremih, Ty Dolla $ign	The Fate of the Furious: The Album
"Game Time"	2017	Flo Rida	non-album single
"Tambourine"	2017	Kool John	Up All Night
"Vice Versa"	2018	Nef the Pharaoh, ShooterGang Kony, Raymond McMahon	Vice Versa
"Way 2 Much"	2018	Show Banga, Iamsu!	Da Glo Up
"Snack"	2019	Flo Rida, E-40	non-album single
"Die For It"	2019	Mozzy	Internal Affairs
"Trust Issues"	2019	Chris Brown	Indigo
"Outy When I Drive / Blamed"	2019	Chris Brown, Rich the Kid, Yella Beezy	Indigo
"Stash House"	2019	Philthy Rich	Big 59
"Crazy"	2019	Lil Bean	HoodHero
"Cut Ties"	2019	Mozzy, Marc E. Bassy	non-album single
"Don't"	2019	Maniac Flame	Global
"Getaway"	2019	Maniac Flame	Global
"OD"	2022	Rayven Justice	Many Moons
"FOO"	2023	Price	Gospel In the Ghetto
"MOTF"	2023	Stevie Stone, Krizz Kaliko	Rasing the Bar
"OMG"	2025	Flo Rida	non-album single

== Production discography ==
List of producer and songwriting credits (excluding guest appearances, interpolations, and samples)
Track(s)	Year	Credit	Artist(s)	Album
3. "Turnt Up"	2012	Producer	Smoovie Baby	Young, Wild & Pretty
9. "Watch Ya Mouth"	2012	Producer	Smoovie Baby	Young, Wild & Pretty
3. "Kesha"; (featuring Smoovie Baby and Salty)	2012	Producer	AM Dre	I Am
6. "Blast Off"	2013	Producer	Smoovie Baby	5 Hunnit Degreez
"Resumé" (featuring Smoovie Baby and Sage the Gemini)	2013	Producer	D-Mac	—N/a
1. "Blast Off Again"	2013	Producer	D. Cannons	TTA2
2. "Don't Stop"	2013	Producer	Iamsu!, Problem	Million Dollar Fro
8. "Pressed"; (featuring Honey Cocaine)	2013	Producer	Tyga	Well Done IV
13. "Return of the Mack"; (featuring Sage the Gemini and P-Lo)	2013	Producer	Iamsu!	Kilt II
"Do It Again" (featuring Smoovie Baby)	2013	Producer	Sage the Gemini	—N/a
7. "Top Down"; (featuring Sage the Gemini)	2014	Producer	Smoovie Baby	All In: The EP
"Prince Charming" (featuring TJ Bridges)	2015	Producer	Derek King	—N/a
"Like Me" (featuring Sage the Gemini and Derek King)	2016	Producer	JuicetheFlyest	—N/a
"Wednesday" (featuring Sage the Gemini)	2016	Producer	Chinae	—N/a
13. "Y.H.U.N.G."	2017	Producer	SOB X RBE	Gangin
"F*ck Suckaz"	2018	Producer	Show Banga	—N/a
21. "Trust Issues / Act In"	2019	Songwriter	Chris Brown	Indigo
"Rascal (Superstar)"	2020	Producer	Tinashe	—N/a
