= JasonMartin discography =

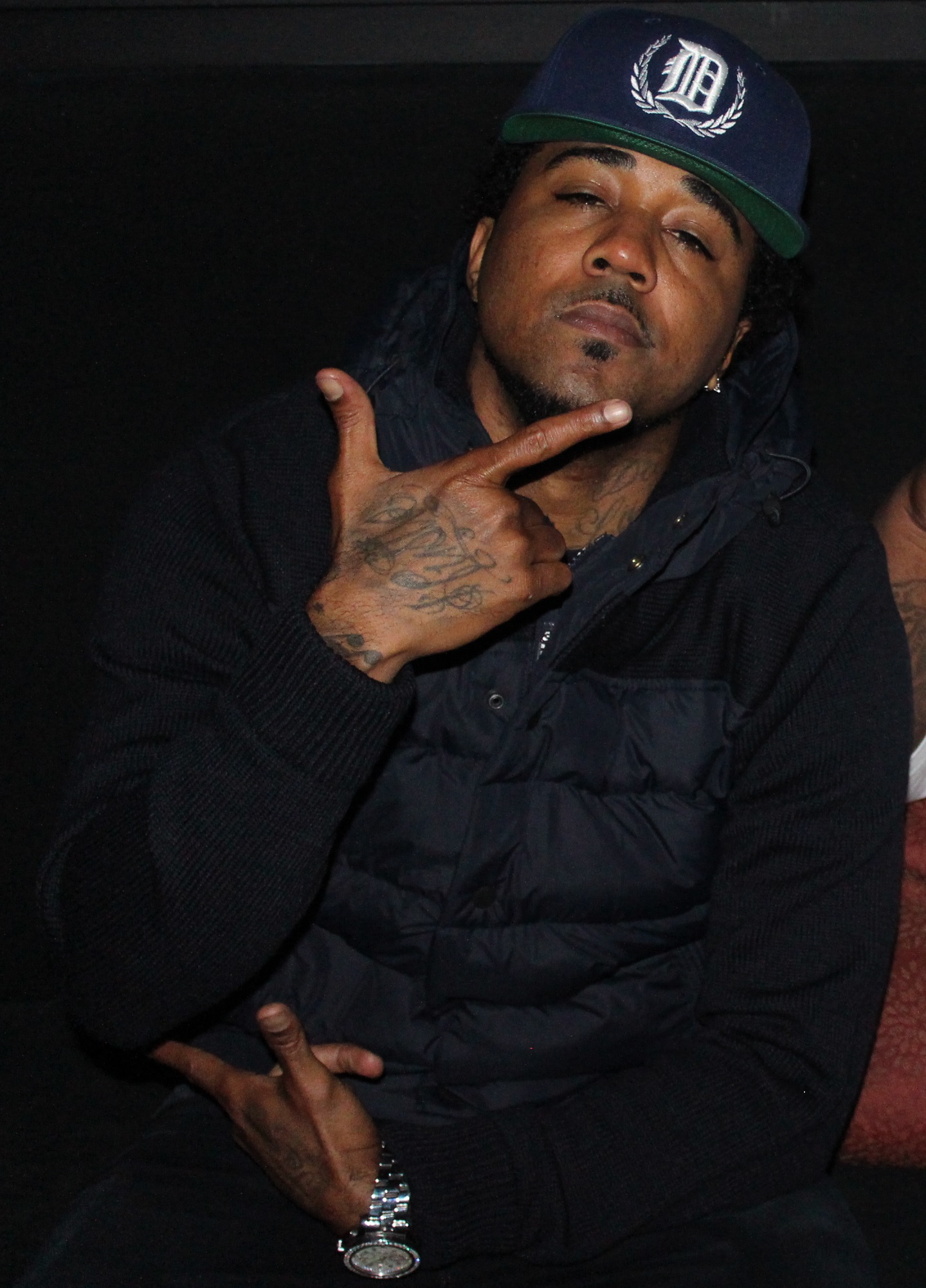
- Problem in December 2013
- Studio albums: 0
- EPs: 2
- Singles: 16
- Mixtapes: 15

American rapper JasonMartin (formerly Problem) has released two albums, one extended play (EP), thirteen mixtapes and sixteen singles.

== Independent mixtapes & EPs ==
List of albums, with year released
Title	Album details
Selfish EP	Released: November 3, 2017; Label: Diamond Lane Music Group; Format: Digital download
The Separation 2	Released: June 30, 2017; Label: Diamond Lane Music Group; Format: Digital download

== Mixtapes ==
List of mixtapes, with year released
Title	Album details
Deal or No Deal	Released: November 2, 2006; Label: Self-released; Format: Digital download
Deal or No Deal 2: Universal Cut the Check	Released: July 9, 2008; Label: Self-released; Format: Digital download
Hotels	Released: July 26, 2011; Label: Self-released; Format: Digital download
Swig Tape	Released: January 30, 2012; Label: Self-released; Format: Digital download
Welcome To Mollywood	Released: March 6, 2012; Label: Self-released; Format: Digital download
Welcome To Mollywood 2	Released: August 30, 2012; Label: Self-released; Format: Digital download
Million Dollar Afro (with Iamsu!)	Released: February 13, 2013; Label: Self-released; Format: Digital download
Ain't Nobody Hotter Than Me	Released: May 8, 2013; Label: Self-released; Format: Digital download
The Separation	Released: June 13, 2013; Label: Self-released; Format: Digital download
354: Lift Off	Released: August 28, 2014; Label: Self-released; Format: Digital download
OT: Outta Town	Released: February 24, 2015; Label: Self-released; Format: Digital download
Mollywood 3: The Relapse (Side A & B)	Released: June 30, 2015; Label: Diamond Lane music Group, Dope House; Format: Digital download
Hotels 2 the Master Suite	Released: April 1, 2016; Label: Diamond Lane music Group, Dope House; Format: Digital download
Chachiville	Released: January 20, 2017; Label: Diamond Lane music Group, Dope House; Format: Digital download

== Extended plays ==
List of extended plays, with selected chart positions and certifications
Title	Details	Peak chart positions
Title	Details	US R&B/HH
Understand Me	Released: December 10, 2013; Label: Diamond Lane Music Group; Formats: Digital download	44

== Singles ==
=== As lead artist ===
List of singles, with selected chart positions and certifications, showing year released and album name
Title	Year	Peak chart positions				Album
Title	Year	US	US R&B	US Rap	US Heat	Album
"I'm Toe Up"	2008	—	—	—	—	Deal or No Deal 2: Universal Cut The Check
"Double Dip" (featuring Ty Dolla Sign)	2011	—	—	—	—	Hotels
"T.O." (featuring Skeme)	2012	—	118	—	—	Welcome to Mollywood
"Like Whaaat" (featuring Bad Lucc)	2013	—	32	25	19	Ain't Nobody Hotter Than Me
"Twerk" (featuring Bad Lucc)	2013	—	—	—	—	Ain't Nobody Hotter Than Me
"Say That Then" (featuring Glasses Malone)	2013	—	—	—	—	The Separation
"Andele" (featuring Lil Jon)	2015	—	—	—	—	Mollywood 4
"Nothin" (featuring Jay Rock and Jack Harlow)	2020	―	―	―	―	Non-album single
"DIM MY LIGHT" (with Snoop Dogg)	2021	―	―	―	―	Non-album single
"—" denotes a recording that did not chart or was not released in that territory.

=== As featured artist ===
List of singles as featured performer, with selected chart positions showing year released and album name
Title	Year	Peak chart positions			Album
Title	Year	US	US R&B	US Rap	Album
"Function" (E-40 featuring YG, Iamsu! and Problem)	2012	121	62	22	The Block Brochure: Welcome to the Soil 2
"AKUP" (LoveRance featuring Tyga and Problem)	2012	—	—	—	Freak Of The Industry
"Show Summ" (League of Starz featuring Problem, Skeme, Freddie Gibbs, Jay Rock, Glasses Malone and Bad Lucc)	2013	—	—	—	Non-album single
"I Don't Want Her" (Eric Bellinger featuring Problem)	2014	—	53	—	The Rebirth
"Walk Thru" (Rich Homie Quan featuring Problem)	2014	74	31	20	I Promise I Will Never Stop Going In
"Sweatpants" (Childish Gambino featuring Problem)	2014	—	35	—	Because The Internet
"T.H.O.T." (The Game featuring Problem, Huddy and Bad Lucc)	2014	—	—	—	Non-album single
"Work In" (Que featuring Problem)	2014	—	—	—	6th Man
"Dare You 2 Move" (Destructo featuring Problem)	—	—	—	West Coast EP	
"My Cutie Pie" (Lil Jon featuring Problem, Snoop Dogg and T-Pain)	2015	—	—	—	Non-album single
"All That" (Ab-Soul featuring JasonMartin and Thirsty P)	2024	—	—	—	Soul Burger
"—" denotes a recording that did not chart or was not released in that territory.

== Other charted songs ==
List of non-single songs, with selected chart positions, showing year released and album name
Title	Year	Peak chart positions	Album
Title	Year	US R&B	Album
"Bout Me" (Wiz Khalifa featuring Problem and Iamsu!)	2012	52	O.N.I.F.C.
"Don't Shoot" (The Game featuring Rick Ross, 2 Chainz, Diddy, Fabolous, Wale, DJ Khaled, Swizz Beatz, Yo Gotti, Currensy, Problem, King Pharaoh and TGT)	2014	53	Non-album single
"—" denotes a recording that did not chart or was not released in that territory.

== Guest appearances ==
List of non-single guest appearances, with other performing artists, showing year released and album name
Title	Year	Other artist(s)	Album
"Whatcha Wan Do"	2009	DJ Quik, Kurupt, Yo-Yo	Blaqkout
"Upside Down"	2009	Snoop Dogg, Nipsey Hussle	Malice n Wonderland
"Drop That Shit"	2011	Iggy Azalea	Ignorant Art
"Dat Good"	2012	Abrina	—N/a
"The Molly Song"	2012	J. Stalin	—N/a
"Jelly"	2012	Andre Nickatina	—N/a
"I Trap She Strip"	2012	Mucho Deniro, Reem Riches, Tee Cee 4800	—N/a
"Rachett"	2012	A.I.T	—N/a
"On Me"	2012	Freddie Gibbs	Baby Face Killa
"Bout Me"	2012	Wiz Khalifa, Iamsu!	Cabin Fever 2
"Pacc Talk"	2012	Wiz Khalifa, Juicy J	Cabin Fever 2
"Smokin' Drinkin'"	2012	Wiz Khalifa	Cabin Fever 2
"100 Bottles"	2012	Wiz Khalifa	Cabin Fever 2
"I'm Feelin"	2012	Wiz Khalifa, J.R. Donato, Juicy J	Cabin Fever 2
"Shut Up"	2012	Berner, Chris Brown	Urban Farmer
"Make It Clap"	2013	$REALMONEY$, Tez McClain	—N/a
"Chevy"	2013	David Cash, E-40, Clyde Carson	—N/a
"My Zone"	2013	Parlay Starr	—N/a
"N P"	2013	J B, Lac	—N/a
"Like This Like That"	2013	Young BC	—N/a
"Dance All Night"	2013	Baby Bash	—N/a
"Step On the Gas"	2013	Fly Street Gang, Iamsu!	—N/a
"You Can't Stop Me"	2013	Jordan Johnson	—N/a
"Fa Da Dough"	2013	Tae Snap	—N/a
"Something Else"	2013	Terrace Martin	3ChordFold
"Let The Blunt Go"	2013	Funkmaster Flex, Chris Brown	Who You Mad At? Me Or Yourself?
"Problems"	2013	B.o.B, T.I., Mac Boney, Trae tha Truth, Young Dro	G.D.O.D. (Get Dough or Die)
"Ain't Worried About Nothin'" (Remix)	2013	French Montana, Crooked I, Game, Dizzy Wright	—N/a
"One Eighty Seven"	2013	Freddie Gibbs	ESGN
"One Eye Kitten" (Remix)	2013	Wale, Webbie, Black Cobain	The Gifted
"Secondary"	2013	RL Grime	High Beams
"Complacent"	2013	Rapsody	She Got Game
"Fuck Her So Long"	2013	Mistah F.A.B., Iamsu!	Hella Ratchet
"TD"	2013	The Game	OKE: Operation Kill Everything
"Turn Down For What"	2013	The Game, Clyde Carson	OKE: Operation Kill Everything
"Bad Bitch"	2013	Young Dro, T.I., Spodee	High Times
"Turn Up or Burn Up"	2013	E-40, Skeme	The Block Brochure: Welcome to the Soil 6
"More Champagne"	2013	DJ Whoo Kid, Wiz Khalifa, ASAP Ferg	—N/a
"All Gas"	2014	Doe B, T.I., Shad da God, Trae Tha Truth	D.O.A.T. 3 (Definition of a Trapper)
"Check"	2014	T.I., Dro, Trae tha Truth	G.D.O.D. II
"Would You"	2014	Roscoe Dash	Glitch
"Do Yo Gudda" (Remix)	2014	Hitta J3, Kendrick Lamar, YG	—N/a
"Up on the Wall"	2015	The Game, Ty Dolla $ign, YG	The Documentary 2.5
"Get Naked"	2015	Murs, 9th Wonder	Brighter Daze
"A.I.T.T."	2015	Rick Rock, Stresmatic	Rocket
"Call Again"	2016	Wiz Khalifa, Juicy J	Cabin Fever 3
"Get Off Me"	2016	Tech N9ne, Darrein Safron	The Storm
"Relax"	2018	E-40	The Gift of Gab
"Gin and Drugs"	2018	Wiz Khalifa	Rolling Papers 2
"Gettin Loose"	2019	Currensy, Wiz Khalifa	2009
"Ooh"	2019	E-40	Practice Makes Paper
"The Part"	2026	The Game, Lefty Gunplay, YG, RJMrLA, Mark Lux, Mike & Keys	The Documentary III
