= Show Banga =

American rapper

- Also known as: Show Banga aka Showy aka Showyformayor
- Born: William Lassiter; October 3rd
- Origin: San Francisco, California Fillmore District
- Genres: Hip hop; hyphy
- Occupations: Rapper; songwriter; record producer
- Years active: 2010–present
- Labels: Cam Publishing, EMPIRE Distribution, HomeTeam Entertainment
- Website: Showy4Mayor.com

Show Banga is an American rapper and songwriter and record producer from San Francisco, California. Currently signed to Cam Publishing, he was releasing singles as early as 2011 on HomeTeam Entertainment, and in 2013 he released the deluxe edition of his album Don't Stop Votin'. Show Banga's single "Milli," which was produced by Dave-O of The A-Team, was released in 2014. According to Rehab Online Magazine, "Show Banga arguably has one of the most rare [rap] flows in the Bay Area, with 'I Been That' being a contender for the rapper’s breakout cut. However, the bass-packed track 'Milli' is pretty damn hard." In April 2015, he released Mayor 4 Life on EMPIRE Recordings, with guest artists such as E-40, Kool John, Sage The Gemini, and P-Lo. Show Banga has performed at festivals such as SXSW, and was on to tour with Iamsu! in spring 2015. On August 12, 2016, he released his technical sophomore album, Showtime 2.

== Early life and career ==
Show Banga was born in San Francisco, California, where he was raised in the Fillmore District. By the age of seven he was rapping, and by high school he had decided to pursue music as a career. Early on he rapped in the local group Go - Gettaz, which developed a local following and went on to tour locally before disbanding. By 2011 Show Banga was releasing his own solo material, as well as appearing on the Team BackPack cyphers in the area.

== Singles, Don't Stop Votin (2013–2014) ==
As early as 2013 he was releasing solo material on HomeTeam Entertainment, and singles that year included "No Losses" in May and "Do My Own Thang" in June, which featured Iamsu!, CJ and P-Lo. In October 2013, he released the deluxe edition of his album Don't Stop Votin', also on HomeTeam. He increased his singles output in 2014, and continued to appear in episodes of the Road to A3C cypher series, which is produced by TeamBackpack. Also in 2014, he appeared as a guest artist on tracks such as "Panoramic" by Sage the Gemini

=== "I Been That" (2014) ===
External videos
- "I Been That" Music Video on VEVO (Nov 17, 2014)
- "Aww Shit" ft. P-Lo Music Video on VEVO (May 5, 2015)

In late 2014, Show Banga's single “I Been That," which featured Sage the Gemini, was included in the Roof Vol. 1 mix put out by the music publication Noisey. The mix featured artists in the Bay Area rap scene. The publication wrote that "Showy’s been a ninja for a few years, catching our attention with 'Shots Fired' in 2011 and becoming a fan favorite on the TeamBackPack cyphers around the same time. Although Show Banga hasn’t had that one mega hit yet, we know it’s coming, and 'I Been That' is another step closer. 'I Been That' deploys a proven formula popularized by Clyde Carson's "Slow Down" and Sage The Gemini's 'Gas Pedal' in that it uses a similar driving bass line..."

== Guest and solo projects (2014–2015) ==
"I Been That" was placed in local radio rotation, and was shortly after followed by Show Banga's new single "Milli," which was produced by Dave-O of The A-Team. According to Rehab Online Magazine in November 2014, "Show Banga arguably has one of the most rare [rap] flows in the Bay Area, with 'I Been That' being a contender for the rapper’s breakout cut. However, the bass-packed track 'Milli' is pretty damn hard."

He was featured along with J. Stalin and Kool John on a Rayven Justice track in February 2015, also releasing a number of solo singles around the same time. On March 21, 2015, he performed at SXSW, and afterwards announced that he'll be opening for Iamsu! on Iamsu!'s spring Eyes On Me tour.

On April 7, 2015, he released his full-length album Mayor 4 Life on EMPIRE Recordings, as well as on the HomeTeam and Mo Betta labels. Among the guest artists on the album were E-40, iamsu!, Kool John, Jay Ant, Sage The Gemini, P-Lo, and Kidd Kidd, with singles such as "Aww Shit" featuring Sage the Gemini and P-Lo. Show Banga has released several official music videos, also appearing as a collaborator on videos such as "How U Love That," also featuring Iamsu! and Smoovie Baby." The video debuted in Complex Magazine in April 2015. On August 12, 2016, he released his technical sophomore album, Showtime 2, whose title paid tribute to his father a hustler and businessman from the Fillmore District.

== Personal life ==
As of 2015 he is based in San Francisco, California.

== Discography ==
=== Albums ===
| Year | Album title | Release details |
|---|---|---|
| 2013 | Showy 4 Mayor (The Street Album) | Released: April 5, 2013; Label: HomeTeam Entertainment; Format: CD |
| 2013 | Dont Stop Votin (Deluxe Edition) | Released: October 29, 2013; Label: HomeTeam Entertainment; Format: CD, digital download |
| 2015 | Mayor 4 Life | Released: April 7, 2015; Label: EMPIRE / HomeTeam / Mo Betta; Format: CD, digital download |
| 2016 | ShowTime 2 | Released: August 12, 2016 |
| 2018 | Da Glo Up | Released: April 6, 2018; Label: EMPIRE / HomeTeam / Mo Betta; Format: Digital Download |
| 2019 | ChuNyceIKnow | Released: August 30, 2019; Label: Squad Squad Records; Format: Digital Download |
| 2020 | Chuway or Noway | Released: January 31, 2020; Label: Squad Squad Records; Format: Digital Download |
| 2020 | Paper & Passion | Released June 26, 2020; Label: Squad Squad Records/ OnDaBeat Music/ EMPIRE; Format: Digital Download |
| 2021 | Almost Time - EP | Released October 22, 2021; Cam Publishing; Format: Digital Download |
| 2023 | Perfect Timing | Released: July 7, 2023; Cam Publishing; Formar: Digital Download |

=== Singles ===
Incomplete list of songs by Show Banga
| Year | Title | Album | Release details |
|---|---|---|---|
| 2011 | "Shots Fired" | Single | HomeTeam Ent. (May 7, 2013) |
| 2013 | "No Losses" | Single | HomeTeam Ent. (May 7, 2013) |
| 2013 | "Do My Own Thang" (feat. Iamsu!, CJ & P-Lo) | Single | HomeTeam (June 4, 2013) |
| 2013 | "Yo Spot" | Single | HomeTeam (Oct 9, 2013) |
| 2013 | "Put On" (feat. San Quinn & Ya Boy Rich Rocka) | Single | HomeTeam (Oct 29, 2013) |
| 2013 | "Legend" (feat. Iamsu!) | Single | HomeTeam (Oct 29, 2013) |
| 2013 | "What You Got?" (feat. Sage the Gemini) | Single | HomeTeam (Oct 29, 2013) |
| 2014 | "I Been That" (feat. Sage the Gemini) | Single | HomeTeam (May 6, 2014) |
| 2014 | "Milli" | Single | HomeTeam / EMPIRE (Dec 17, 2014) |
| 2014 | "I Just Dont" (feat. Rich Rocka) | Single | HomeTeam / EMPIRE (Dec 17, 2014) |
| 2014 | "Still Go Dumb" | Single | HomeTeam / EMPIRE (Dec 17, 2014) |
| 2014 | "Ain't Gotta Lie" (feat. Kool John) | Single | HomeTeam / EMPIRE (Dec 18, 2014) |

=== Guest appearances ===
Selected songs featuring Show Banga
| Year | Single name | Album | Primary artist(s) |
|---|---|---|---|
| 2013 | "Panoramic" (ft. Sage the Gemini & Show Banga) | Single | Dmac |
| 2014 | "We Can't Tell" (ft. Sean B Da Don, Show Banga & Dmac) | Single | G-Money |
| 2014 | "I'm So Fillmoe" (ft. Hunnid Favors, Show Banga, Rich Rocka) | Single | Bailey |
| 2014 | "On Me" (ft. Show Banga, Peezy & Priceless Da Roc) | Single | Inka |
| 2014 | "You Know" (ft. Show Banga, Rayven Justice) | Single | Trayce |
| 2014 | "Bitches" (ft. Show Banga, D-Lo) | Single | City Shawn |
| 2014 | "Cakewalk" (ft. Show Banga) | Single | Tia Nomore |
| 2014 | "Panoramic" (ft. Show Banga, Sage the Gemini, Kstylis) | Single | Dmac |
| 2015 | "I Am" (ft. Show Banga and Yg) | Single | Trayce |
| 2015 | "Don't Need You" (ft. Kool John, Show Banga, TJ Bridges, Derek King & Lex Aura) | Single | The A-Team |
| 2015 | "Live and Die in the Bay" (ft. Show Banga, J Stalin & Kool John) | Single | Rayven Justice |
| 2015 | "You Know" (ft. Show Banga and Rayven Justice) | Single | Trayce |
| 2015 | "Out My Face" (ft. Show Banga) | Single | Skipper |
| 2015 | "Keep It Lit" (ft. Show Banga) | Single | DDMS |

== See also ==
- Hyphy
