= List of West Coast hip-hop artists =

The rappers are listed by the first letter in their name (not including the words "a", "an", or "the"). This list only includes artists that have a Wikipedia page.

The list refers to rappers of a specific subgenre, not all hip-hop artists.

== 0–9 ==
- 03 Greedo
- 100s
- 11/5
- 187 Fac
- 213
- 24kGoldn
- 2Mex
- 2nd II None
- 2Pac
- 3X Krazy

== A ==
- Ab-Soul
- Above the Law
- Aceyalone
- Adrian Marcel
- Afroman
- Ahmad
- Akiva Schaffer
- Akwid
- The Alchemist
- Aminé
- Anderson .Paak
- Andre Nickatina
- Andy Samberg
- Anotha Level
- Arabian Prince

== B ==
- B2K
- B.G. Knocc Out
- B-Legit
- B-Real
- Baby Keem
- Bad Azz
- Beautiful Eulogy
- Becky G
- Berner
- Big Syke
- Bishop Lamont
- Black Eyed Peas
- Black Hippy
- Blackalicious
- Bloods & Crips
- Blu
- Blu & Exile
- Blueface
- Blxst
- Bobby Brackins
- Bohemia
- Boogie
- Braille
- Brainwash Projects
- Brotha Lynch Hung
- Brownside
- Butch Cassidy *Big Sean

== C ==
- C-Bo
- CJ Mac
- Cali Swag District
- Capital Punishment Organization
- Casey Veggies
- Cashis
- Celly Cel
- Charizma
- Childish Gambino
- Chilly Chill
- Chuck Inglish
- The Click
- Clyde Carson
- Cold 187um (Big Hutch)
- College Boyz
- Compton's Most Wanted
- The Conscious Daughters
- Coolio
- Cool Nutz
- Cougnut
- The Coup
- Cozz
- Crooked I
- Cypress Hill

== D ==
- The D.O.C.
- Da Lench Mob
- Dame D.O.L.L.A
- The Dangerous Crew
- Darkroom Familia
- Daz Dillinger
- Death Grips
- Del the Funky Homosapien
- Delinquent Habits
- Digital Underground
- Dilated Peoples
- Dizzy Wright
- Dj Cell
- DJ Fresh
- DJ Mustard
- DJ Pooh
- DJ Quik
- DJ Shadow
- DJ Yella
- D-Shot
- Doggy's Angels
- Doja Cat
- Dom Kennedy
- Domino
- Domo Genesis
- Down AKA Kilo
- The Dove Shack
- Dr. Dre
- Drakeo the Ruler
- Dresta
- Dru Down
- Dubb Union
- Dumbfounddead

== E ==
- E-40
- E-A-Ski
- Earl Sweatshirt
- Eazy-E
- Egyptian Lover
- Emcee N.I.C.E.
- EBK Jaaybo
- Evidence

== F ==
- Fashawn
- The Federation
- Freestyle Fellowship
- Foesum
- Funkdoobiest
- Funky Aztecs
- Futuristic
- Fenix Flexin

== G ==
- G-Eazy
- The Game
- Get Busy Committee
- Gift of Gab
- Glasses Malone
- Goldie Loc
- Gospel Gangstaz
- Greydon Square
- The Grouch
- Guerilla Black

== H ==
- HBK Gang
- Haiku D'Etat
- Havoc
- Hed PE
- Hi-C
- Hieroglyphics
- Hodgy Beats
- Hopsin
- Hot Dollar
- House of Pain
- Husalah

== I ==
- Iamsu!
- Ice Cube
- Ice-T
- Illmaculate
- Imani
- Insane Poetry

== J ==
- J-Flexx
- J.J. Fad
- J.Lately
- J Stalin
- JT the Bigga Figga
- J. Wells
- The Jacka
- Jaden Smith
- Jake One
- Jasmine V
- Jay Rock
- Jayo Felony
- Johnny Richter
- Jonwayne *Jorma Taccone *Joyo Velarde

== K ==
- K-Dee
- Kam
- Kausion
- Keak da Sneak
- Kendrick Lamar
- Kid Frost
- Kid Ink
- Kid Sensation
- King Tee
- Kingspade
- Knight Owl
- Knoc-Turn'Al
- Kokane
- Kottonmouth Kings
- Kreayshawn
- Krondon
- Kung Fu Vampire
- Kurupt
- Kyle
- Krazy-Dee

== L ==
- LA Dream Team
- L.A. Posse
- LA Symphony
- Lady of Rage
- Larry June
- Lateef the Truthspeaker
- Latyrx
- Lazarus
- LBC Crew
- Left Brain
- Lifesavas
- Lighter Shade of Brown
- Likwit Crew
- Lil B
- Lil Darkie
- Lil Debbie
- Lil Eazy-E
- Lil Mosey
- Lil Ric
- Lil Rob
- Lil Xan
- Living Legends
- Locksmith
- The Lonely Island
- Lootpack
- Lords of Lyrics
- LoveRance
- LPG
- Luckyiam
- Luni Coleone
- Luniz
- Lyrics Born

== M ==
- Mac Dre
- Mac Mall
- Mac Minister
- Mack 10
- Macklemore
- Madchild
- Madlib
- Mann
- Marc E. Bassy
- Mars
- Marvaless
- Marques Houston
- MC Eiht
- MC Hammer
- MC Ren
- MC Smooth
- MC Trouble
- Mellow Man Ace
- Menace Clan
- Menajahtwa
- Messy Marv
- Mike G
- Mike Shinoda
- Mindless Behavior
- Mistah F.A.B.
- Mista Grimm
- Mitchy Slick
- Mopreme Shakur
- Mount Westmore
- Mozzy
- Mr. Capone-E
- Mr. Doctor
- Mr. Malik
- Ms. Toi
- Murs
- Mila J

== N ==
- N2Deep
- Nate Dogg
- Nationwide Rip Ridaz
- NB Ridaz
- Nef the Pharaoh
- New Boyz
- Nick Cannon
- Nipsey Hussle
- NoClue
- Numskull
- N.W.A
- Neffex

== O ==
- OMG
- Oaktown 3.5.7
- Odd Future
- One Block Radius
- Orko Eloheim
- O.T Genasis
- OhGeesy

== P ==
- PSD
- Pac Div
- The Pack
- Paperboy
- Paris
- Peace 586
- Penthouse Players Clique
- People Under the Stairs
- The Pharcyde
- Pigeon John
- Planet Asia
- Playa Hamm
- Potluck
- Problem
- Propaganda
- Proper Dos
- Psycho Realm
- Psychosiz

== Q ==
- Quasimoto
- Quo

== R ==
- RBL Posse
- RBX
- Rappin' 4-Tay
- Ras Kass
- Rasco
- Ray J
- Ray Luv
- The Real Richie Rich
- Redfoo
- Remble
- Rexx Life Raj
- Richie Rich
- Rob $tone
- Roddy Ricch
- Rodney O & Joe Cooley
- Roshon Fegan
- Rydah J. Klyde
- RJmrLA

== S ==
- Saafir
- Sage the Gemini
- Saint Dog
- Sam Sneed
- San Quinn
- Saweetie
- Schoolboy Q
- Seagram
- Sen Dog
- Shabazz Palaces
- Shade Sheist
- Shoreline Mafia
- Shorty Mack
- Sir Jinx
- Sir Mix-a-Lot
- Skee-Lo
- Slim the Mobster
- Smooth
- Smoov-E
- Snoop Dogg
- Snow tha Product
- SOB X RBE
- Souls of Mischief
- South Central Cartel
- Soopafly
- Spice 1
- Spider Loc
- Stat Quo
- Steady Mobb'n
- Storm
- Strong Arm Steady
- Stunnaman
- Subnoize Souljaz
- Suga Free
- Suga T
- Sunspot Jonz
- SwizZz
- Swollen Members
- Sylk-E. Fyne

== T ==
- T-Bone
- T. Mills
- Tash
- The Team
- Techniec
- Tha Alkaholiks
- Tha Dogg Pound
- Tha Realest
- The Nonce
- The Rej3ctz
- Thurzday
- Tone Lōc
- Too Short
- Totally Insane
- Trackademicks
- Travis Knight
- Traxamillion
- Tray Deee
- Tunnel Rats
- Turf Talk
- Tweedy Bird Loc
- Twinz
- Twisted Insane
- Ty Dolla Sign
- Tyga
- Tyler, the Creator

== U ==
- U-N-I
- The Unknown DJ

== V ==
- V-Nasty
- Vince Staples
- Volume 10

== W ==
- WC
- WC and the Maad Circle
- Warren G
- Chanel West Coast
- Westside Connection
- World Class Wreckin' Crew

== X ==
- X-Raided
- Xzibit

== Y ==
- YG
- Yella
- Yomo & Maulkie
- Young De
- Young Lay
- Young Maylay
- Young Murder Squad
- Young Noble
- Young Soldierz
- Yo-Yo
- Yukmouth

== Z ==
- Zion I
