= Morse Code (disambiguation) =

Morse code is a method used in telecommunication to encode text characters.

Morse Code may also refer to:

- American Morse code, an early form of the code
- Morse Code (album), a mixtape by Sage the Gemini
- Morse Code (horse), a racehorse
