= Kilt II =

Mixtape by Iamsu!
- Released: June 6, 2013
- Recorded: 2013
- Genre: Hip hop
- Label: HBK Gang; EMPIRE Distribution
- Producer: Iamsu! (also exec.); CJ; Kuya Beats; P-Lo; Sage the Gemini; Trackademicks; Tha Bizness; The Invasion; Exclusive

Iamsu! chronology
Million Dollar Afro (2013)	Kilt II (2013)	Sincerely Yours (2014)

Singles from Kilt II
- 1. "Let Go" Released: August 6, 2013; 2. "Hipster Girls" Released: December 3, 2014

Kilt II is the fifth solo mixtape by American rapper Iamsu!. The mixtape was released on June 6, 2013, independently for free. Then on July 9, 2013, a deluxe edition of the mixtape was released to digital music retailers. Production on the mixtape was primarily handled by Iamsu! and other members of the group The Invasion, among others such as Trackademicks, and Tha Bizness. The album featured guest appearances members of The Invasion, HBK Gang, among others such as Problem, Juvenile, Ty Dolla Sign, Terrace Martin, Tank, and Mistah FAB. The mixtape was met with generally positive reviews from music critics.

== Background ==
On February 13, 2013, both Iamsu! and Problem, who they had met for the first time at the "Function" video shoot, released a collaboration mixtape, titled Million Dollar Afro. The mixtape was praised by Tom Breihan of Stereogum and Spin named the mixtape one of the best rap releases of 2013. On March 5, 2013, Spin named Iamsu! as the tenth "Hottest MC in the Game". The mixtape serves as the sequel to Iamsu!'s third mixtape, 2012's Kilt.

== Production ==
Iamsu! incorporates live instrumentation on Kilt II, which he says "is more musical than anything I've done before. I played instruments on here. I experimented with vocoder. I composed most of the music and worked with a lot of talented musicians. I tried a lot of new sounds." The mixtape's production was primarily handled by Iamsu!, P-Lo and other members of his production team The Invasion. Other individuals that provided production included Trackademicks, Tha Bizness and Exclusive. Guest appearances on the mixtape came from members of The Invasion, HBK Gang, among others such as Problem, Juvenile, Tydollasign, Terrace Martin, Tank, and Mistah F.A.B

== Release and promotion ==
In May 2013 Iamsu! begun his first headlining tour, in promotion of his at the time upcoming mixtape Kilt II. On July 9, 2013, a deluxe edition of the mixtape was released featuring five new tracks, including the Problem featuring "The Realest" and a full remastering and higher audio quality.

Iamsu! premiered the music video for the mixtape's first track, "Father God" via Rolling Stone on July 2, 2013. He explained the background of the song to them saying, "Everybody has their perspective on religion in hip-hop, and lately there's been a lot of talking down on it. So when it came time to write this song, I just felt like praying on the chorus. I believe there is a God and that I owe him a great deal. I've been blessed."

On August 6, 2013, the Tank featuring "Let Go" produced by Tha Bizness, was released as the mixtape's lead single. On October 14, 2013, the music video for "Hipster Girls" was released. On December 3, 2013, "Hipster Girls" was released as the album's second single.

== Critical reception ==
Professional ratings
Review scores
Source	Rating
Pitchfork Media	7.5/10

Upon its release, Kilt II was met with generally positive reviews from music critics. Pitchfork Media gave the mixtape a 7.5 out of 10 rating saying, the mixtape "doubles down on all of his strongest and most likeable qualities: Largely self-produced, high-energy, and creative, it shows Iamsu! continuing to transform from a promising, agreeable Bay Area rap figure into a burgeoning star." Spin would also praise the mixtape saying, "As much a showcase of Iamsu!'s production prowess as it is evidence of his unique lyrical skills, the new tape is an enjoyably bumpy ride through treble-y bleeps, bassy bloops, tinny drums, and hard-hustling vocals." The Fader said, Iamsu!'s "laid-back delivery are definitely appealing, but it's the sticky, moody production touches—like distant, eerie synth sparkles, from Invasion member P-Lo, or swelling strings—that make Kilt II so fun and absorbing.

== Track listing ==
Retail deluxe edition
No.	Title	Producer(s)	Length
1.	"Father God"	IamSu!	4:08
2.	"Rollin'"	IamSu!	3:07
3.	"Hold It Down" (featuring Kool John and Skipper)	P-Lo	3:05
4.	"Rep That Gang"	P-Lo	3:22
5.	"Key of Life" (featuring Jay Ant and CJ)	IamSu!	3:52
6.	"Changes"	IamSu!	3:00
7.	"Sexy Ladies"	Jay Ant; IamSu!	2:26
8.	"Hipster Girls"	Trackademicks	3:13
9.	"Float" (featuring Ty Dolla $ign and Terrace Martin)	Kuya Beats	3:46
10.	"Let Go" (featuring Tank)	Tha Bizness	3:11
11.	"Yeah Yeah"	IamSu!; P-Lo	3:22
12.	"Millions"	P-Lo	2:37
13.	"Return of the Mac" (featuring P-Lo and Sage The Gemini)	IamSu!; Sage The Gemini	3:43
14.	"On Citas" (featuring Keak Da Sneak and Mistah FAB)	IamSu!	3:25
15.	"Down to Earth" (featuring Dayvid Michael, Carbyne, Clyde Shankle and Azure)	IamSu!	3:45
16.	"Won't Land"	Exclusive	3:53
17.	"The Science" (featuring Mani Draper and Terrace Martin)	IamSu!	3:31
18.	"Best Thing Yet" (featuring Kool John and 1-O.A.K.)	IamSu!	6:31
19.	"100 Grand (Remix)" (featuring Juvenile, Problem and Kool John)	P-Lo	4:19
20.	"The Realest" (featuring Problem)	IamSu!	2:20
21.	"91 Corvette" (featuring Kool John, Dave Steezy and Jay Ant)	Jay Ant; P-Lo	3:35
22.	"Designer"	IamSu!	4:09

== Chart positions ==
Chart (2013)	Peak position
US Heatseekers Albums (Billboard)	26
US Top R&B/Hip-Hop Albums (Billboard)	52
