= Rayven Justice =

American rapper, singer and actor

- Born: August 13, 1991 (age 34); Oakland, California
- Origin: East Oakland
- Genres: Hip hop; R&B; soul; hyphy; hip hop soul; neo soul
- Occupations: Rapper; singer; songwriter; actor
- Instrument: Vocals
- Years active: 2010–present
- Labels: Rayven Justice Music Group; NuFace Entertainment; Empire Distribution
- Website: RayvenJustice510.com

Rayven Justice (born August 13, 1991) is an American rapper, singer and actor from Oakland, California. He started his career as part of the rap and songwriter duo Justice Brothers with his brother Raymen. Rayven Justice began pursuing a full-time solo career in 2010, and his vocals typically blend R&B with "hip hop beats and plenty of bass." His collaborative album Both Sides of the Tracks was released in 2012, and he has also collaborated with artists such as French Montana, Dubb, Iamsu!, TeeFlii, Problem, Waka Flocka Flame, Pleasure P, and Migos. After releasing a number of singles, Rayven Justice released his I Have a Dream EP and album in 2014. Currently based in Oakland, he tours regularly.

== Early life ==
Rayven Justice was born on August 13, 1991, in Oakland, California. Raised in East Oakland, in his youth he started making music with his younger brother, singing and rapping under his legal name Rayven Justice. His brother's name is Raymen Justice, and together they formed the hip hop and R&B musical duo Justice Brothers. After his brother was shot and killed in 2010, Rayven Justice decided to commit himself full-time to music in his brother's memory.

== Music career ==
=== 2010–12: First releases ===
In 2010, he collaborated on the track "Throw the Cash," which proved to be Rayven Justice's first significant breakthrough. The single was later included on his August 2011 mixtape Something About Rayven. In 2012, he soon after released the album Both Sides of the Tracks. Rayven Justice released several singles that summer as well. In 2013, he partnered with Rita Lee, CEO of Nuface Entertainment, to form Rayven Justice Music Group, and Signed a non-exclusive distribution deal with Empire Distribution.Although a partnership with California-based label Urban Life Distribution with aegis of Sony RED was planned, Justice chose EMPIRE Distribution .

=== 2013: "Slide Thru" and collaborations ===
External videos
- Rayven Justice – "Slide Thru" (Explicit) on VEVO (December 4, 2013)

In late 2013 he released his single "Slide Thru," which featured Migos. It was published through Empire Distribution in San Francisco, and received regular airplay on the Bay Area radio station KMEL. Wrote Complex.com about the song in 2014, "it shows how very slight variations on an existing formula can create radically different effects on the listener, the cartoonish 'I'm Different' pianos mutating into enigmatic atmosphere." A remix of "Slide Thru" by Migos was later released in March 2014.

In January 2014, he release the mixtape I have a dream was released by January 20, 2014

=== August 2014: I Have a Dream EP and album ===
He has toured in support of his music, opening KMEL's annual Summer Jam concert held at the Oracle Arena in Oakland. According to Rayven Justice, the Oracle Arena performance held personal significance, as he and his younger brother had previously promised one another never to attend Summer Jam unless they were performing at the event. He was living in the Bay Area as of early 2014, also spending time in Los Angeles to collaborate with rappers and producers such as TeeFlii., and in September he toured throughout much of the United States with Compton rapper Problem .

On August 19, 2014, he released the EP I Have a Dream, with tracks such as "Slide Thru," "I See You" featuring Kool John, and "Hit or Nah." The album was released on his own record label, with the singles distributed through Empire Distribution. He released a second remix of his earlier track "Slide Thru" in October 2014, with a feature by Atlanta rapper Waka Flocka Flame. A music video for their collaboration was released in early November, as was an album-length version of I Have a Dream Deluxe. Rayven Justice is one of several Bay Area artists selected to perform at the first EMPIRE Unplugged live recording session on December 11, 2014, which also included other soul and R&B artists such as Chinx Uncle Murda Joe Moses Eric Bellinger, Jonn Hart, and Lyrica Anderson.

In early 2015, he released a single with aspiring rapper Ankit Oswal "AO" under the label Team3MG. This topped multiple charts on YouTube, and desi-hiphop. He is currently working with AO on a second single expected to be released in early 2017.

July 17, 2015, Rayven Justice released The Cassette Playlist Mixtape hosted by Dj Carisma.

== Style and equipment ==
Rayven Justice's songs typically blend R&B stylings and vocals with "a hip hop beat and plenty of bass."

== Discography ==
=== Albums ===
Selected albums by Rayven Justice
Year	Album title
Both Sides of the Tracks	Released: 2012; Format: CD, digital
On Tour Volume 1	Released: November 2013; Format: CD, digital
I Have a Dream (Deluxe Edition)	Released: November 4, 2014; Label: Rayven Justice Music Group, LLC/ Empire Distribution; Format: CD, digital
Do It Justice	Released February 12, 2016; Rayven Justice Music Group, LLC/ Empire Distribution; Format: CD, digital
Wavy Justice	Released July 14, 2017; The Rayven Justice Music Group, LLC/ Empire Distribution; Format: CD, digital
Wavy Justice 2	Released March 2, 2018; The Rayven Justice Music Group; Format: CD, digital
The Cassette Playlist (EP)	Released: July 17, 2015; Label: Rayven Justice Music Group, LLC/Empire Distribution; Format: Digital

=== Extended plays ===
Extended plays by Rayven Justice
Year	Album title	Release details
2014	I Have a Dream – EP	Released: August 19, 2014; Label: Rayven Justice Music Group, LLC; Format: CD, digital

=== Singles ===
Incomplete list of songs by Rayven Justice
Year	Title	Chart peaks	Album	Release details
Year	Title	Emerging Artists	Album	Release details
2011	"Throw the Cash on Her"	—	Something About Rayven	Big Cat (August 23, 2011)
2011	"Came to Party"	—	Cosmonauts	Ice King (October 1, 2011)
2012	"Grabbin' on my Zipper"	—	Single	Ice King (July 9, 2012)
2012	"Cheater"	—	Single	Ice King (August 21, 2012)
2013	"Slide Thru" (ft. Migos)	24	Single/I Have a Dream EP	(late 2013)
2014	"Slide Thru (Remix)" (ft. Waka Flocka Flame)	—	Single	Rayven Justice (March 25, 2014)
2014	"Hit or Nah"	—	Single/I Have a Dream	Teris V/Rayven Justice (May 20, 2014)
2014	"Forgot Your Name"	—	Single	(August 25, 2014)
2014	"On Mamas" (ft. TeeFlii and Problem)	—	Single	Rayven Justice (September 5, 2014)
2014	"Might as Well"	—	Single	(December 1, 2014)
2014	"How I Do It"	—	Single	(December 1, 2014)
2015	''Pull Up''	_	Do It Justice	(August 28, 2015)
	"Roll Something"		Do it Justice	(December 17, 2015)

=== Guest appearances ===
Selected songs featuring Rayven Justice
Year	Single name	Primary artist(s)	Album	Release details
2013	"Ride on It" (ft. Rayven Justice, Iamsu!, Sage the Gemini, etc.)	Armani DePaul	Single	Rapbay (July 23, 2013); Music video
2013	"Yike On It" (ft. Rayven Justice, Iamsu!, Rossi, etc.)	Armani DePaul	Single	Rapbay (July 23, 2013); Music video
2014	"She Gon' Roll It" (ft. Rayven Justice and Iamsu!)	Dubb	Never Content	RBC (January 28, 2014)
2014	"Real One" (ft. Rayven Justice)	Sleepy D	Single	EMPIRE (July 21)
2015	"Keep Ridin" (ft. Rayven Justice)	Ankit Oswal (AO)	Single	Major Moves Music Group
2015	"Gamed Up" (ft. Rayven Justice)	E-40	Poverty & Prosperity	Heavy on the Grind, Universal (November 15, 2015)
2021	"Nowhere to Be Found" (ft. Rayven Justice)	Rhino!	Hotel Management	(April 16, 2021)
