= Only That Real =

2014 single by Iamsu!

Single by Iamsu! featuring 2 Chainz and Sage the Gemini

from the album Sincerely Yours
- Released: February 4, 2014
- Recorded: 2013
- Genre: Hip hop
- Length: 3:40
- Label: The HBK Gang
- Songwriters: Tauheed Epps; Paulo Ytienza Rodriguez; Sudan Williams; Dominic Woods
- Producer: P-Lo of The Invasion

Iamsu! singles chronology
"Gas Pedal" (2013)	"Only That Real" (2014)	"Hot Girls" (2014)

2 Chainz singles chronology
"Cut Her Off" (2013)	"Only That Real" (2014)	"24 Hours" (2014)

Sage the Gemini singles chronology
"Kiss It" (2013)	"Only That Real" (2014)	"G.D.F.R." (2014)

Only That Real is a song by American rapper Iamsu! from his debut studio album, Sincerely Yours (2014). It was released as his commercial debut single on February 4, 2014. It features American rappers 2 Chainz and fellow HBK Gang member Sage the Gemini, with production handled by P-Lo of The Invasion.

== Release ==
The song premiered on January 28, 2014, and was released for digital download on iTunes Store on February 4, 2014. "Only That Real" is the first single of Iamsu!'s debut studio album, Sincerely Yours, which was released in May 2014.

== Music video ==
The music video for "Only That Real", directed by Alex Nazari, premiered via BET Jams on April 11, 2014.

== Remix ==
The official remix of the song, which features American rappers Yo Gotti and French Montana, was released on November 13, 2014.

== Chart performance ==
Chart (2014)	Peak position
U.S. Billboard Bubbling Under R&B/Hip-Hop Singles	6
US Rhythmic Airplay (Billboard)	28
