= Sincerely Yours (Iamsu! album) =

Studio album by Iamsu!
- Released: May 13, 2014
- Recorded: 2013–14
- Genre: Hip hop
- Length: 56:31
- Labels: HBK Gang; Alternative Distribution Alliance
- Producers: Iamsu! (also exec.); Tha Bizness; Jake One; Trackademicks; Chase N. Cashe; P-Lo; YPOnTheBeat; Kuya Beats; Jay Ant; Cal-A; LewiVBeatz

Iamsu! chronology
Kilt II (2013)	Sincerely Yours (2014)	Kilt III (2016)

Singles from Sincerely Yours
- 1. "Only That Real" Released: February 4, 2014; 2. "I Love My Squad" Released: April 22, 2014

Sincerely Yours is the debut studio album by American rapper Iamsu!. The album was released on May 13, 2014, by HBK Gang and Warner Music Group's Alternative Distribution Alliance. Recording for the album took place during 2013 and 2014. The album's production was handled by members of The Invasion, Tha Bizness, Jake One, Trackademicks and Chase N. Cashe, among others. Iamsu! collaborated with various artists on the album including 2 Chainz, Wiz Khalifa, Too Short, E-40, Berner, Dizzy Wright, along with HBK Gang members Sage the Gemini, P-Lo, Kool John, Skipper and Dave Steezy. The album was supported by the singles, "Only That Real" featuring 2 Chainz and Sage the Gemini and "I Love My Squad".

== Background ==
In May 2013, Iamsu! began his first headlining tour, in promotion of his mixtape Kilt II. On June 6, 2013, Iamsu! released Kilt II. Production on the mixtape was primarily handled by Iamsu! along with other members of The Invasion. It was met with generally positive reviews from music critics.

In January 2014, Iamsu! announced the album during his freestyle over YG's "Who Do You Love?". In the song Iamsu! raps, "Did the tour, got signed, now the album coming." Four days later, Iamsu! elaborated about the album to hip hop magazine XXL, revealing the title and the projected release date of April 2014. He describes the work as an autobiographical concept album.

== Recording and production ==
In 2013, the album's recording process began following the release of his mixtape Kilt II and concluded in 2014. The first collaboration was with HBK Gang member Sage the Gemini. In March 2014, during his appearance at SXSW, Iamsu! revealed Wiz Khalifa, 2 Chainz, the entire HBK Gang, E-40, Too Short, Chase N. Cashe, Jake One and Tha Bizness would be contributing to the album. The final version of the album featured guest appearances from 2 Chainz, Wiz Khalifa, Too Short, E-40, Berner, Dizzy Wright along with HBK Gang members Sage the Gemini, Kool John and Skipper. Other collaborators included Andre Nickatina, Problem and Dave Steezy. He said his favorite feature on the album was Kool John's. A song titled "Lifetime" was recorded but not included on the final track listing.

On the production side, Iamsu! produced four tracks on the album, and executive produced it. He told XXL "I wanted it to sound like one of those classic Aftermath albums, like the first album on the label that Dr. Dre puts out for an artist. I wanted to have some of those moments where it was like, scary good. And have that definitive moment, where they encapsulate what their movement and their culture is." The Invasion, Tha Bizness, Jake One, Trackademicks and Chase N. Cashe contributed production to the final version of the album.

== Release and promotion ==
During 2013, Iamsu! built his buzz by releasing multiple mixtapes including Million Dollar Afro with rapper Problem, Kilt II and the HBK Gang compilation Gang Forever. All three were released for retail sale via digital download retailers. They were met with generally positive reviews from music critics.

On February 5, 2014, Iamsu! released "Yesterday". It was released as a thank you to fans following the retail release of "Only That Real". Then in mid-February 2014, HBK Gang released their Heartbreak Camo Pack clothing line in San Francisco, California. Guests at the launch were treated to a surprise show by Iamsu! and a physical copy of a new EP titled Camo, which Iamsu! then uploaded to SoundCloud. The three song EP featured guest appearances from rappers Dizzy Wright and Sage The Gemini. Production on Camo was provided by Iamsu!, Sage, and YPOnTheBeat. Also during February 2014, Iamsu! officially signed a deal with Warner Music Group-owned Alternative Distribution Alliance who will promote his album, while he maintains creative control, but with an industry edge to get his music into physical stores. On March 26, he hosted a listening party at the 333 Recording studio in New York City for Sincerely Yours.

From March 6, 2014, through April 12, 2014, Iamsu! toured with HBK Gang members P-Lo and Skipper on the "Only That Real" Tour, a mini concert tour to promote the single and Sincerely Yours. After seemingly abandoning the April release period due to sample clearance issues, on March 26, 2014, Iamsu! announced that the album would be released on May 13, 2014. Shortly after on April 8, he revealed the cover artwork, which was created by famed artist Slvstr. He also published the official track listing and announced that it would be available for pre-order on April 22, 2014. The album was then released for free streaming via SoundCloud on May 6, 2014. The cover artwork which displays Iamsu!, represents rising and falling: rising to the occasion, falling in love with music, falling out of love with his ex-girlfriend, among others. Iamsu! will begin touring with Wiz Khalifa, Tyga, Ty Dolla $ign, Rich Homie Quan, and Sage the Gemini on July 24 until August 24, 2014, on the Under the Influence of Music Tour.

On May 14, 2021, the album was re-released to digital platforms after being absent for sometime under 'Sincerely Yours, IAMSU!'. This re-release featured a different track listing, omitting some features as well as different beats for some of the songs.

== Singles ==
On January 7, 2014, Iamsu! revealed the album's first single, featuring a collaboration with Sage the Gemini. The song was premiered online on January 28, 2014, via SoundCloud. The final version featured fellow rappers 2 Chainz and the previously announced appearance by Sage the Gemini. The song's production was handled by The Invasion and HBK Gang member P-Lo. On February 4, 2014, it saw the official retail release of "Only That Real" to digital download music retailers. Within the next month, the music video was filmed with 2 Chainz, Sage and the rest of the HBK Gang in Richmond, California. The behind the scenes video was released on March 2, 2014. The music video was delayed, due to animation sequences in the video. On April 11, 2014, it was officially premiered.

"I Love My Squad", which is self-produced, was announced to be released as the album's second single. The music video was filmed during April 2014. It was officially released as the album's second single on April 22, 2014. The song was remastered and re-released to iTunes on October 14, 2014.

=== Promotional singles ===
When the album was made available for pre-order on April 22, 2014, the Wiz Khalifa-collaboration "What You 'Bout" was released as a promotional single.

== Critical response ==
Professional ratings
Aggregate scores
Source	Rating
Metacritic	59/100
Review scores
Source	Rating
HipHopDX	3/5 stars
Pitchfork	6/10
Rolling Stone	2.5/5 stars
Spin	7/10
XXL	(L)

Sincerely Yours was met with generally mixed reviews from music critics. At Metacritic, which assigns a normalized rating out of 100 to reviews from critics, the album received an average score of 59, based on 5 reviews, indicating "generally mixed or average reviews". Rachel Chesbrough of XXL stated that "Sincerely Yours is a highly listenable sampling of throwback Bay undertones, overlaid with a more modern sound and structure. He proves easy to listen to both as a capable MC with some shining moments, and as a young producer who remains loyal to his city." Brandon Soderberg of Spin said, "the moments where his lofty sonic ambition is answered with compelling content suggests the potential for a truly singular plateau jump. It just doesn't happen enough, here. Sincerely Yours, then, remains another sturdy addition to the discography of one of rap's more thrilling creatives."

Fred Thomas of AllMusic stated that, "Falling somewhere between the mainstream rap-pop beats of Top 40 rappers like Drake and the hyphy influence of Iamsu's California roots, the album wanders between happy-go-lucky rap ballads like "Girls" and more club-friendly tracks and even the jazzy hybrid beat of "Ascension"." Christopher R. Weingarten of Rolling Stone said, "Outside of its strong singles ("Only That Real" and "What You 'Bout"), Sincerely fades into rap's existing trends instead of bucking them." Sheldon Pearce of HipHopDX stated, "At maximal output, Iamsu! adventurously explores the Bay Area's established terrain with Sincerely Yours, but it doesn't punch with the ferocity of past work." Overall saying it was not as exceptional as his previous solo mixtape Kilt II.

=== Accolades ===
Complex named it the thirty-sixth best album of the first half of 2014. Writing for them, Justin Davis said, "his debut album is one of the most honest projects of the year."

== Commercial performance ==
The album debuted at number 50 on the Billboard 200 chart, with first-week sales of 5,832 copies in the United States.

== Track listing ==
Standard edition
No.	Title	Producer(s)	Length
1.	"Intro"	Kuya Beats	2:40
2.	"No Secret"	Tha Bizness	3:12
3.	"Interlude"	Iamsu!; Kuya Beats; Cal-A	1:28
4.	"Only That Real" (featuring 2 Chainz and Sage the Gemini)	P-Lo	3:40
5.	"Girls"	Tha Bizness	3:56
6.	"Sincerely Yours"	Trackademicks	2:09
7.	"Stop Signs"	Tha Bizness	2:59
8.	"I Love My Squad"	Iamsu!	3:21
9.	"Interlude II"	Iamsu!; Cal-A; LewiVBeatz	1:44
10.	"Back On Your Mind" (featuring Kool John and Skipper)	Iamsu!	3:42
11.	"What You 'Bout" (featuring Wiz Khalifa, Berner and P-Lo)	Iamsu!; P-Lo	3:37
12.	"T.W.D.Y." (featuring Too $hort and E-40)	Kuya Beats	3:21
13.	"Ascencion"	Jay Ant	2:35
14.	"Problems" (featuring Dave Steezy)	Chase N. Cashe	4:10
15.	"Martina"	Jake One	2:17
Total length:			44:48

Deluxe edition (bonus tracks)
No.	Title	Producer(s)	Length
16.	"The Weather" (featuring Sage the Gemini)	Sage the Gemini	2:46
17.	"Plan B" (featuring Dizzy Wright)	Iamsu!	3:12
18.	"So Long"	YPOnTheBeat	2:28
19.	"Hipster Girls"	Trackademicks	3:14
Total length:			56:31

Sincerely Yours 1.5 (bonus tracks)
No.	Title	Producer(s)	Length
20.	"Only That Real (Remix)" (featuring French Montana and Yo Gotti)	P-Lo	3:26
21.	"On Me" (featuring Rich Homie Quan and Kool John)	P-Lo	4:00
22.	"Aiight" (featuring Project Pat)	Iamsu!	3:32

== Charts ==
Chart (2014)	Peak position
US Billboard 200	50
US Top R&B/Hip-Hop Albums (Billboard)	12
US Independent Albums (Billboard)	8
