= Remember Me (Sage the Gemini album) =

Studio album by Sage the Gemini
- Released: March 25, 2014
- Recorded: 2012–14
- Genre: Hip hop
- Length: 40:26
- Label: HBK Gang; EMPIRE; Republic
- Producer: Sage the Gemini; Jay Ant; Kuya Beats; The Exclusives; P-Lo; League of Starz; Tha Bizness

Sage the Gemini chronology
Gas Pedal EP (2013)	Remember Me (2014)	Morse Code (2017)

Singles from Remember Me
- 1. "Red Nose" Released: March 19, 2013; 2. "Gas Pedal" Released: March 21, 2013; 3. "College Drop" Released: December 17, 2013; 4. "Down On Your Luck" Released: February 25, 2014; 5. "Don't You" Released: January 3, 2015

Remember Me is the debut studio album by American rapper Sage the Gemini. It was released on March 25, 2014, by HBK Gang Records, EMPIRE Recordings and Republic Records. The album was produced by Gemini himself, The Exclusives, League of Starz, Tha Bizness and members of The Invasion such Jay Ant, Kuya Beats and P-Lo. The album features guest appearances from Iamsu!, Justin Bieber, Kool John, Jay Ant, P-Lo, Eric Bellinger, Berner and August Alsina, among others.

The album was met with generally positive reviews from music critics, who complimented its production and Sage's vocals, but criticized its lyrical content. Remember Me debuted at number 47 on the US Billboard 200, selling 7,200 copies in its first-week. It was certified Gold by the Recording Industry Association of America (RIAA), denoting sales of over 500,000 copies in the United States. The album was supported by five singles: "Red Nose", "Gas Pedal" featuring Iamsu!, "College Drop" featuring Kool John, "Down On Your Luck" featuring August Alsina, and "Don't You".

== Reception ==
=== Critical reception ===
Professional ratings
Aggregate scores
Source	Rating
Metacritic	69/100
Review scores
Source	Rating
AllMusic	3.5/5 stars
Exclaim!	6/10
HipHopDX	3/5 stars
NOW	3/5 Ns
Pitchfork	7.5/10
RapReviews	7/10
Rolling Stone	3/5 stars
USA Today	3/4 stars
XXL	3/5 (L)

Remember Me garnered mixed to positive reviews from music critics. At Metacritic, which assigns a normalized rating out of 100 to reviews from critics, the album received an average score of 69, which indicates "generally favorable reviews," based on 10 reviews.

Martin Caballero of USA Today said that "Gas Pedal" only hinted at what his debut album will showcase, which is "buoyed by energetic and richly textured beats, he deftly mixes slick raps with Auto-Tuned vocals on singles like 'Desert of Mirages'." AllMusic's David Jeffries praised the album for containing tracks that exude the same energy that "Gas Pedal" did, calling it a very good party album and praising Sage for being "a great host, juggling familiar and fun with ease." Pitchfork contributor Craig Jenkins praised Sage's production and vocal delivery for bringing a lot charm into the tracks, concluding that: "Remember Me keeps its mood light and its stakes low, and in the process delivers a much needed breezy counterpoint to all the knotty, fatalistic shit coming out of HBK's downstate peers that’s every bit as true to Cali as the gangsters and the thinkers."

Patrick Taylor of RapReviews commended Sage for his production choices that "favor[s] ambient elements over dance elements" and establishing himself as a credible rapper with tracks like "Second Hand Smoke" and "Go Somewhere" that flesh out his character persona but felt he had a limited range of topics and resorted to more conventional hip-hop tropes that feel off with the record's spacious vibes. He concluding that: "It's frustrating that so many of the songs stick to the same clichéd themes because Sage can actually rap. He's got a low-key charm, spitting his rhymes effortlessly […] Remember Me "isn't a perfect album, but it has some great songs and a lot of promise. Sage the Gemini has established himself as an artist worth remembering. HipHopDX writer Ronald Grant gave credit to both Sage and P-Lo for their consistent beat work throughout the track listing, highlighting both "Down On Your Luck" and "Mad at Me" for incorporating R&B sounds that give off a "more melodic, delicate quality", but was critical of the album overall feeling "indistinguishable" with its lyrical subject matter and production lacking "diversity, imagination and risk-taking" alongside similar rap radio content concluding with, "But what Sage The Gemini lacks in lyricism and engaging subject matter, he makes up for in magnetism and harmonic finesse. Remember Me's faults definitely hold it back, but it’s still largely likeable and satisfying when it comes to simply being festive West Coast party Hip Hop."

Jordan Sowunmi from NOW noted how Sage's musicianship wasn't versatile and adopted the same production more suited for "short-burst Vine videos", but said there's an addictiveness to his "spare aesthetic" concluding that: "Overall, the record is buoyed by relentless exuberance and good-natured charm." While finding the album filled with club tracks and lyricism that range from simplistic to odd, Jameel Raeburn of XXL found the production ear-grabbing and danceable, concluding that, "There's no question that Remember Me is best served with the volume turned all the way up." Rolling Stone writer Christopher R. Weingarten was mixed about the album, giving credit to most of the tracks for being attention-grabbing but found it monotonous in its lyrical range. Erin Lowers of Exclaim! also praised Sage's production and voice for being distinct but criticized his lack of deeper lyrical content and songs for not leaving a lasting impact, saying that he "presses the gas pedal too quickly before capturing your attention lyrically or sonically."

=== Commercial performance ===
The album debuted at number 47 on the Billboard 200, selling 7,200 copies during its first-week in the United States. It was certified gold by the Recording Industry Association of America in the US on March 26, 2021.

== Track listing ==
Standard version
No.	Title	Writer(s)	Producer(s)	Length
1.	"Remember Me"	Dominic Wynn Woods; Paulo Rodriguez	P-Lo of The Invasion	2:51
2.	"Bad Girls"	Woods	Sage the Gemini	2:23
3.	"Go Somewhere" (featuring Iamsu!)	Woods; Sudan Williams	Sage the Gemini	4:31
4.	"Gas Pedal" (featuring Iamsu!)	Woods; Williams	Sage the Gemini	3:28
5.	"Red Nose"	Woods	Sage the Gemini	3:13
6.	"College Drop" (featuring Kool John)	Woods; Rodriguez; Jonathan Faulk	P-Lo	2:54
7.	"Put Me On" (featuring Shady Bo)	Woods	Sage the Gemini	3:53
8.	"Down On Your Luck" (featuring August Alsina)	Woods; August Alsina; Dominic Logan; Sean McMillion; Ralph Jeanty	The Exclusives	2:16
9.	"Mad at Me" (featuring Jay Ant and Iamsu!)	Woods; Jay Fort; Williams	Jay Ant	2:45
10.	"Nothing to Me" (featuring Iamsu!)	Woods; Williams; Rodriguez	P-Lo	3:34
11.	"Don’t You"	Woods	Sage the Gemini	2:17
12.	"Second Hand Smoke" (featuring Eric Bellinger)	Woods; Donte Blacksher; Eric Bellinger; Aaron Smith	League of Starz	2:45

Deluxe edition (bonus tracks)
No.	Title	Writer(s)	Producer(s)	Length
13.	"Just a Kiss"	Woods; Oliver Rodriguez	Kuya Beats of The Invasion	2:39
14.	"Desert of Mirages" (featuring Berner and Kehlani)	Woods; Gilbert Milam; Christopher Whitacre; Justin Henderson	Tha Bizness	4:29
15.	"Give It Up" (featuring Berner and P-Lo)	Woods; Milam; P. Rodriguez	P-Lo; Sage the Gemini	3:43
16.	"Gas Pedal (Remix)" (featuring Justin Bieber and Iamsu!)	Woods; Williams; Bieber	Sage the Gemini	4:39

Best Buy Deluxe edition (bonus tracks)
No.	Title	Writer(s)	Producer(s)	Length
17.	"They Don't Love You"	Woods; Whitacre; Henderson	Tha Bizness	3:31
18.	"Stupid" (featuring E-40)	Woods; Earl Stevens; P. Rodriguez	P-Lo	3:36

== Charts and certifications ==
=== Weekly charts ===
Chart (2014)	Peak position
US Billboard 200	47
US Top R&B/Hip-Hop Albums (Billboard)	11
US Top Rap Albums (Billboard)	5

=== Certifications ===
Certifications for Remember Me
Region	Certification	Certified units/sales
New Zealand (RMNZ)	Gold	7,500^{‡}
United States (RIAA)	Gold	500,000^{‡}
^{‡} Sales+streaming figures based on certification alone.
