= Practice Makes Paper =

2019 studio album by E-40

Studio album by E-40
- Released: July 26, 2019
- Genre: Hip-hop
- Length: 86:49
- Label: Heavy on the Grind
- Producer: Clayton William; ChaseTheMoney; Traxamillion; Iamsu!; P-Lo; Helluva; Hitmaka; Paupa; Cypress Moreno; Prop the Producer; Traxx FDR; Fresh on the Beat; Reece Beats; Raytona; Zeke Beats; Droop-E; Migui Maloles; Decadez; DNYCE; Issue; Supa Dave West; Bosko; Disko Boogie

E-40 chronology
| The Gift of Gab (2018) | Practice Makes Paper (2019) | Snoop Cube 40 $hort (2022) |

Singles from Practice Makes Paper
- 1. "Melt" Released: March 14, 2019; 2. "Chase the Money" Released: June 18, 2019

Practice Makes Paper is the twenty-sixth album by the American rapper E-40. It was released on July 26, 2019, by Heavy on the Grind Entertainment.

The album features guest appearances from Anthony Hamilton, ASAP Ferg, Chris Brown, Fabolous, G-Eazy, Quavo, Rick Ross, Roddy Ricch, Scarface, Schoolboy Q, Tee Grizzley, Wiz Khalifa, Method Man and Redman, among others.

Professional ratings
Review scores
| Source | Rating |
|---|---|
| HipHopDX | 3.8/5 |
| Pitchfork | 7.4/10 |

== Background ==
In August 2018, E-40 announced that he was releasing three albums: The Gift of Gab in August, Rule of Thumb in October and Practice Makes Paper in December. Practice Makes Paper was eventually delayed until July 26. The third installment, Rule of Thumb was released in 2023.

== Singles ==
The intended lead single from the album, "Melt", was released on March 14, 2019, and features rapper Milla. The song was produced by Clayton William; it did not appear on the final album.

The second single, "Chase the Money", was released on June 18, 2019, and features Quavo, Roddy Ricch, Schoolboy Q and ASAP Ferg. The song was produced by ChaseTheMoney. It peaked at number 36 on the Billboard Rhythmic chart.

== Track listing ==
| No. | Title | Producer(s) | Length |
|---|---|---|---|
| 1. | "Wake They Shit Up" (featuring B-Legit and Stressmatic) | Traxamillion | 3:44 |
| 2. | "Goat" (featuring Milla) | Clayton Williams | 2:27 |
| 3. | "Chase the Money" (featuring Quavo, Roddy Ricch, ASAP Ferg and Schoolboy Q) | ChaseTheMoney | 4:45 |
| 4. | "1 Question" (featuring Chris Brown, Rick Ross and Jeremih) | Hitmaka | 4:10 |
| 5. | "Rain on My Parade" (featuring Ty Dolla Sign and G-Eazy) | Paupa and Cypress Moreno | 3:12 |
| 6. | "Big Deal" (featuring Wiz Khalifa and P-Lo) | P-Lo | 2:43 |
| 7. | "Watch the Homies" (featuring Scarface) | Prop The Producer | 3:50 |
| 8. | "I Don't Like Em" (featuring Cousin Fik and Laroo) | Traxx FDR | 3:55 |
| 9. | "I'm It" | Bankroll Got it | 2:22 |
| 10. | "No Choice" (featuring James Too Cold) | Fresh on the Beat | 3:07 |
| 11. | "I Come from the Game" (featuring Payroll Giovanni, Peezy and Sada Baby) | Helluva | 3:53 |
| 12. | "Don't @ Me" (featuring OMB Peezy) | Traxamillion | 3:36 |
| 13. | "Blossom" (featuring Rexx Life Raj and Boosie Badazz) | Reece Beats | 2:29 |
| 14. | "Made This Way" (featuring Tee Grizzley and Rod Wave) | Traxx FDR | 3:08 |
| 15. | "Ooh" (featuring Problem) | Raytona | 3:05 |
| 16. | "Another One" (featuring Fabolous and Red Café) | Traxx FDR | 3:33 |
| 17. | "In the Struggle" | Zeke Beats | 2:20 |
| 18. | "I'mma Find Out" | Decadez | 2:40 |
| 19. | "Stayed Down" (featuring OMB Peezy, Trenchrunner Poodie and Damani) | Traxamillion | 3:46 |
| 20. | "All Day Long" (featuring Stupid Young) | Paupa | 2:36 |
| 21. | "Surroundings" (featuring Stressmatic) | Dnyce | 3:27 |
| 22. | "Bet You Didn't Know" | Issue | 3:45 |
| 23. | "Facts Not Fiction" (featuring Stressmatic) | Helluva | 3:11 |
| 24. | "Thou Wow" (featuring Iamsu!) | Iamsu! | 3:26 |
| 25. | "Keep On Gassin'" (featuring Method Man, Redman and Bosko) | Supa Dave West | 4:07 |
| 26. | "My Everything" (featuring Anthony Hamilton and K-Ci) | Disko Boogie | 3:31 |
| Total length: | | | 86:48 |

== Charts ==
| Chart (2019) | Peak position |
|---|---|
| US Billboard 200 | 65 |
| US Top R&B/Hip-Hop Albums (Billboard) | 32 |
