= Who Booty =

2012 single by Jonn Hart

Single by Jonn Hart featuring Iamsu!

from the album Heart 2 Hart
- Released: October 1, 2012
- Recorded: 2012
- Genre: R&B, hip hop
- Length: 3:10
- Label: Cool Kid Cartel
- Songwriters: Di'Jonn Grizzell, Sudan Williams
- Producer: RawSmoov

Jonn Hart singles chronology
"Who Booty" (2012)	"Band$ On Band$1" (2013)

Iamsu! singles chronology
"Function" (2012)	"Who Booty" (2012)	"Gas Pedal" (2013)

"Who Booty" is a song by American R&B singer Jonn Hart, featuring vocals from rapper Iamsu!, originally from his debut mixtape Heart 2 Hart. The song has been in regular rotation on radio stations, peaking at #3 on the Rhythmic Songs chart, and #31 on the Billboard Top 40 Pop Songs chart.

== Remix ==
"Who Booty (Remix)"

Single by Jonn Hart featuring French Montana
- Released: December 10, 2012
- Recorded: 2012
- Genre: R&B, hip hop
- Length: 3:09
- Label: Epic
- Songwriters: Di'Jonn Grizzell, Karim Kharbouch
- Producer: RawSmoov

Jonn Hart singles chronology
"Who Booty" (2012)	"Who Booty (Remix)" (2012)

French Montana singles chronology
"Pop That" (2012)	"Who Booty (Remix)" (2012)	"Freaks" (2013)

A remix version of the song featuring a verse from rapper French Montana extended the song's life on the airwaves. The song was released by Epic Records and was near the top 30 of Billboard Hot R&B/Hip-Hop Songs chart. It peaked at #66 on the Billboard Hot 100 and #20 on the Hot R&B/Hip-Hop Songs chart.

Another remix was released, called the R&Bay Remix, featuring new verses from Jonn Hart and a guest verse from E-40.

== Charts ==
Chart (2012–13)	Peak position
US Billboard Hot 100	66
US Hot R&B/Hip-Hop Songs (Billboard)	20
US Pop Airplay (Billboard)	31
US Rhythmic (Billboard)	3

=== Year-end charts ===
Chart (2013)	Position
US Hot R&B/Hip-Hop Songs (Billboard)	68
US Rhythmic (Billboard)	19
