= G.D.F.R. =

Single by Flo Rida featuring Sage the Gemini and Lookas

from the EP My House
- Released: October 21, 2014
- Recorded: 2014
- Genre: Hip hop; trap
- Length: 3:10
- Label: Atlantic; Poe Boy
- Songwriters: Tramar Dillard; Dominic Woods; Lucas Rego; Mike Caren; Andrew Cedar; Charles W. Miller; Gerald Goldstein; Harold Brown; Howard E. Scott; Justin Franks; Lee Oskar; Leroy L. Jordan; "B.B." Morris Dickerson; Sylvester Allen
- Producers: DJ Frank E; Andrew Cedar; Lookas; Miles Beard

Flo Rida singles chronology
"How I Feel" (2013)	"G.D.F.R." (2014)	"I Don't Like It, I Love It" (2015)

Sage the Gemini singles chronology
"Only That Real" (2014)	"G.D.F.R." (2014)	"Guantanamera" (2015)

Music video
- "G.D.F.R." on YouTube

"G.D.F.R." (abbreviation for Goin' Down For Real) is a song by American rapper Flo Rida featuring American rapper Sage the Gemini and American music producer and DJ Lookas from the former's EP My House (2015). It was released as the album's lead single on October 21, 2014, in the United States. The song was written by Flo Rida, Sage the Gemini and P-Lo and produced by DJ Frank E and Andrew Cedar with co-production from Lookas and Miles Beard.

The song peaked at number eight on the Billboard Hot 100 in April 2015, making it Flo Rida's tenth top ten single on the chart, selling over one million copies domestically. Outside of the United States, "G.D.F.R." peaked within the top ten of the charts in nine countries, including Denmark, Germany, Norway, and the United Kingdom.

== Composition ==
The song uses instrumental samples from Lookas' remix of "Low Rider" by War, namely in its hook. Some listeners incorrectly believe that the song is played with an oboe, however, the song is played with an alto saxophone by Charles Miller. Flo Rida has stated that he shortened the title to G.D.F.R. to remind the listener of graffiti. Sheet music shows the key of G minor, with a tempo of 146 beats per minute.

== Music video ==
The official music video was released on December 24, 2014. The set revolves around Flo Rida as a basketball coach with professional dancers who double as basketball players (Team Strong Arm vs. Team Mad Dog). Team Strong Arm comes back in the end and wins by 3 points. Miami Heat power forward Udonis Haslem, Natalie La Rose, and Gorilla Zoe makes an appearance. During parts of the video the on screen score displays the incorrect initials G.F.D.R.

Rap group 2 Live Crew (Brother Marquis and Fresh Kid Ice) also make a cameo.

== Charts ==
=== Weekly charts ===
Chart (2015)	Peak position
Australia (ARIA)	36
Austria (Ö3 Austria Top 40)	12
Belgium (Ultratop 50 Flanders)	19
Belgium (Ultratop 50 Wallonia)	19
Canada Hot 100 (Billboard)	10
Canada CHR/Top 40 (Billboard)	11
Czech Republic Airplay (ČNS IFPI)	58
Czech Republic Singles Digital (ČNS IFPI)	6
Denmark (Tracklisten)	10
Euro Digital Song Sales (Billboard)	5
Finland (Suomen virallinen lista)	8
France (SNEP)	22
Germany (GfK)	7
Hungary (Single Top 40)	23
Hungary (Stream Top 40)	5
Iceland (Tónlistinn)	66
Ireland (IRMA)	15
Israel International Airplay (Media Forest)	5
Italy (FIMI)	34
Lebanon (Lebanese Top 20)	7
Mexico Anglo (Monitor Latino)	16
Netherlands (Dutch Top 40)	26
Netherlands (Single Top 100)	17
New Zealand (Recorded Music NZ)	21
Norway (VG-lista)	8
Romania Airplay (Media Forest)	5
Romania TV Airplay (Media Forest)	1
Scottish Singles Sales (Official Charts)	2
Slovakia Airplay (ČNS IFPI)	39
Slovakia Singles Digital (ČNS IFPI)	7
South Korea International (Gaon)	9
Spain (Promusicae)	27
Sweden (Sverigetopplistan)	12
Switzerland (Schweizer Hitparade)	23
UK Singles (Official Charts)	3
UK Hip Hop/R&B (Official Charts)	1
US Billboard Hot 100	8
US Dance Airplay (Billboard)	5
US Hot R&B/Hip-Hop Songs (Billboard)	3
US Hot Rap Songs (Billboard)	2
US Pop Airplay (Billboard)	8
US Rhythmic Airplay (Billboard)	3
US (Monitor Latino)	11

=== Year-end charts ===
Chart (2015)	Position
Austria (Ö3 Austria Top 40)	63
Belgium (Ultratop Flanders)	89
Belgium (Ultratop Wallonia)	73
Canada (Canadian Hot 100)	51
Denmark (Tracklisten)	52
Germany (Official German Charts)	57
Israel (Media Forest)	40
Italy (FIMI)	64
Netherlands (Single Top 100)	67
Spain (PROMUSICAE)	42
Sweden (Sverigetopplistan)	60
UK Singles (Official Charts Company)	45
US Billboard Hot 100	32
US Hot R&B/Hip-Hop Songs (Billboard)	10
US Mainstream Top 40 (Billboard)	41
US Rhythmic (Billboard)	15

Chart (2016)	Position
Brazil (Brasil Hot 100)	70

== Certifications ==
Region	Certification	Certified units/sales
Australia (ARIA)	Gold	35,000^{^}
Canada (Music Canada)	2× Platinum	160,000^{*}
Denmark (IFPI Danmark)	Platinum	60,000^{^}
Germany (BVMI)	Platinum	400,000^{‡}
Italy (FIMI)	2× Platinum	100,000^{‡}
New Zealand (RMNZ)	2× Platinum	60,000^{‡}
Poland (ZPAV)	Platinum	50,000^{‡}
Spain (Promusicae)	Platinum	40,000^{‡}
Switzerland (IFPI Switzerland)	Platinum	30,000^{‡}
United Kingdom (BPI)	Platinum	600,000^{‡}
United States (RIAA)	4× Platinum	4,000,000
^{*} Sales figures based on certification alone.^{^} Shipments figures based on certification alone.^{‡} Sales+streaming figures based on certification alone.
