= Now and Later (song) =

Single by Sage the Gemini

from the album Morse Code
- Released: October 14, 2016
- Recorded: 2016
- Length: 3:13
- Label: Global Gemini; HBK Gang; Atlantic
- Songwriter: Dominic Wynn Woods
- Producers: Axident; Joe London; Ian Kirkpatrick; Leroy Clampitt; James Wong; Dominic Wynn Woods

Sage the Gemini singles chronology
"Good Thing" (2015)	"Now and Later" (2016)	"Pilot" (2017)

"Now and Later" is a song by American rapper Sage the Gemini. It was released on October 14, 2016, as the lead single from his debut mixtape, Morse Code (2017). The song was used in a popular Snapchat filter.

== Background ==
In an interview with Genius, Sage the Gemini spoke on the creation process behind the song:

I was working with APG (Artist Publishing Group) for a very long time and I remember when I was like 19, we tried to come up with a candy song but we just could not do it. Obviously it was very hard since it took me almost like five years to get it nailed. I don’t follow blueprints or whatever. So it just came to me. I wasn't like 'Ooh, I'm going to do this kind of song.' I heard it and as soon as they played it for me I was like 'This is a hit.' I went down there, told him to cut my microphone on, and I just started flowing out of my mind.

== Music video ==
The song's accompanying music video premiered on December 3, 2016, on Sage's YouTube account.

== Commercial performance ==
"Now and Later" debuted on the Bubbling Under R&B/Hip-Hop Singles chart after it was featured in promotion as a Snapchat filter in late November 2016. It later peaked at number 93 on US Billboard Hot 100 for the week of February 25, 2017.

== Charts ==
=== Weekly charts ===
Chart (2016–17)	Peak position
Australia (ARIA)	19
Australia Urban (ARIA)	1
Austria (Ö3 Austria Top 40)	18
Belgium (Ultratip Bubbling Under Flanders)	2
Belgium (Ultratip Bubbling Under Wallonia)	19
Canada Hot 100 (Billboard)	45
Czech Republic Singles Digital (ČNS IFPI)	46
Denmark (Tracklisten)	28
Finland (Suomen virallinen lista)	12
France (SNEP)	195
Germany (GfK)	6
Ireland (IRMA)	20
Italy (FIMI)	70
Netherlands (Dutch Top 40)	32
Netherlands (Single Top 100)	50
New Zealand (Recorded Music NZ)	12
Norway (VG-lista)	18
Portugal (AFP)	56
Scotland Singles (OCC)	14
Slovakia Singles Digital (ČNS IFPI)	32
Sweden (Sverigetopplistan)	12
Switzerland (Schweizer Hitparade)	46
UK Singles (OCC)	17
UK Hip Hop/R&B (OCC)	1
Ukraine (NRJ Top 40)	6
US Billboard Hot 100	93
US Hot R&B/Hip-Hop Songs (Billboard)	36
US Rhythmic Airplay (Billboard)	18

=== Year-end charts ===
Chart (2017)	Position
Germany (Official German Charts)	94
Hungary (Stream Top 40)	86

== Certifications ==
Region	Certification	Certified units/sales
Australia (ARIA)	2× Platinum	140,000^{‡}
Canada (Music Canada)	Platinum	80,000^{‡}
Denmark (IFPI Danmark)	Gold	45,000^{‡}
Germany (BVMI)	Gold	200,000^{‡}
Italy (FIMI)	Gold	25,000^{‡}
New Zealand (RMNZ)	Platinum	30,000^{‡}
United Kingdom (BPI)	Gold	400,000^{‡}
United States (RIAA)	Gold	500,000^{‡}
^{‡} Sales+streaming figures based on certification alone.
