= The HBK Gang =

American hip-hop collective

Background information
- Also known as: The Heartbreak Gang
- Origin: San Francisco Bay Area, California, U.S.
- Genres: Hip-hop; West Coast hip-hop; hyphy
- Years active: 2009–2020
- Label: HBK Gang
- Members: Iamsu!; Sage the Gemini; Kehlani; P-Lo; Jay Ant; Kool John; Skipper; Dave Steezy; Azure; Rossi; IsThatCJ; Kid Rich; Dee Dot Jones
- Past members: LoveRance

The HBK Gang (abbreviation for the Heartbreak Gang) is an American hip-hop collective based in the San Francisco Bay Area. Founded by Iamsu!, Chief, Skipper, and P-Lo in 2008, members also include singer Kehlani and rapper-producers Sage the Gemini, IsThatCJ, Rossi, Dave Steezy, Jay Ant, and Kool John. After contributing to various mixtapes, including Iamsu's Kilt II, in August 2013, the group released their debut mixtape, Gang Forever. HBK Gang Records is an associated independent record label.

== History ==
=== Founding ===
HBK Gang is primarily composed of colleagues who met while attending high school in the San Francisco Bay Area, specifically Pinole. The collective was founded in 2008, while many involved were still in school. By 2013, its members included Iamsu!, Kool John, P-Lo, Sage the Gemini, Skipper (or $kip), CJ, singer Rossi, Dave Steezy, and Jay Ant (or Jay Anthony). Iamsu! first began to form and organize the group in 2011.

Iamsu!, hailing from Richmond, California, was a fan of artists such as Kanye West, R. Kelly, Aaliyah, Marching Band, as well as reggae music. He became acquainted with P-Lo in 2005, and later began working as a rapper and producer himself. P-Lo, inspired by Kanye West's debut album The College Dropout (2004), began creating beats in his youth. P-Lo most notably produced Wiz Khalifa's "Bout Me" and Yo Gotti's single "Act Right," the latter of which entered the Billboard Hot 100. P-Lo joined Iamsu! in the formation of the production team "The Invasion" shortly after their meeting, starting a trend of collaboration between future members. Iamsu! also collaborated with Sage the Gemini on his single "Gas Pedal" in March 2013, which peaked at number 4 on the Billboard Hot Rap Songs and at number 29 on the Billboard Hot 100, making it both artists' first top 40 hit.

=== Early releases ===
The Heartbreak Gang was performing and releasing music as early as 2011 and in August 2011, performed at the debut release party for Tha Outfit's "Like My Bass" music video. The group featured artists Dave Steezy and Mike Dash-E in their music, releasing the track "Gettin' It", featuring Kool John, in 2012. In January 2013, Iamsu! was a guest for Jonn Hart on Hart's "Who Booty" video.

The crew contributed to all of Iamsu's mixtapes, including Kilt II in June 2013, with other guest appearances including Problem, Juvenile, Ty Dolla Sign, Terrace Martin, Tank, and Mistah F.A.B.

=== Gang Forever (2013) ===
HBK Gang released their debut compilation mixtape, Gang Forever, on August 12, 2013. It includes 17 tracks featuring different members of the collective. Much of the album's production was handled by the Invasion (the production team of Iamsu!, P-Lo, Kuya Beats, Jay Ant, HBK Joe and Chief), with tracks also produced by Cardo, AKA Frank, Kuya Beats, Sage the Gemini, and Jay Ant.

=== Touring, music videos ===
The collective toured the western United States during September and August 2013, hitting locations such as Seattle, Spokane, Phoenix, Santa Barbara, and Reno, Nevada. Titled the HBK Forever Tour, it featured Iamsu! as headliner and Kool John and Jay Ant as support. Hip-hop dancing is an important element of the live shows. According to Sage the Gemini, dancing is also a key aspect of the group's creative process. The collective has released both tour videos and a number of music videos for their songs, including "Go Crazy".

== Members ==
Current

- Iamsu! – group founder, hip hop recording artist and producer from Richmond, California
- Skipper – rapper
- Sage the Gemini – hyphy and hip hop recording artist from Fairfield, California, who released "Gas Pedal" in 2013.
- P-Lo – rapper/member of the production team the Invasion
- CJ – also goes by *HBK CJ and *IsThatCJ
- Jay Anthony – rapper/member of the production team the Invasion
- Kool John – rapper
- Rossi – vocals
- Azure – DJ/rapper
- Dave Steezy – rapper
- Kehlani – singer
- Kid Rich – rapper
- Dee Dot Jones - rapper/producer

== Record label ==
HBK Gang Records
- Founded: 2010
- Founder: Iamsu!; Chief; P-Lo
- Status: Active
- Distributor: Warner Music / EMPIRE
- Genre: Hip hop; hyphy
- Location: Bay Area, California

HBK Gang is also the name of a record label, which as of 2013 has released most of Iamsu!'s mixtapes and albums, including Su! The Right Thing (2010), Young California (2011), Kilt (2012), Stoopid (2012), and $uzy 6 $peed (2012). 2013 saw the release of his album Million Dollar Afro, which also features Problem and was coreleased on Problem's label Diamond Lane Music Group. Iamsu!'s Kilt II mixtape followed in 2013, while the HBK Gang's first mixtape, Gang Forever, was released in August 2013. The label's first in-store release was Iamsu!'s debut album, Sincerely Yours, which was released on May 13, 2014.

Releases from HBK Gang Records
Year	Title	Artist
2010	Su! The Right Thing	Iamsu!
2011	Young California	Iamsu!
2011	The Miseducation Of IAmSu	Iamsu!
2011	#IAmMostRachet	Jay Ant
2012	$uzy 6 $peed	Iamsu!
2012	WET	Skipper
2012	Stoopid	Iamsu! and Jay Ant
2012	Kilt	Iamsu!
2012	MBMGC	P-Lo
2013	Million Dollar Afro	Iamsu! and Problem
2013	CJ 2.0	HBK CJ
2013	Blue Money	Mick Boogie Presents: Jay Ant
2013	Kilt 2	Iamsu!
2013	Peace, Love and $hmoplife	Kool John
2013	ChillDrinkF*ckSmoke	Kool John
2013	Gang Forever	HBK Gang
2013	MBMGC 2	P-Lo
2014	WET2	Skipper
2014	Sincerely Yours	Iamsu!
2014	$hmop City	Kool John
2014	Remember Me	Sage the Gemini
2015	All Eyes On Me	Iamsu!
2015	Love and Peace	HBK CJ
2015	Moovie!	Kool John and P-Lo
2015	The Thrill	Skipper

== Discography ==
=== Singles ===
- 2012: "Gettin' It" featuring Kool John
- 2013: "STU Freestyle"

=== Mixtapes ===
Title	Album details
Gang Forever	Released: August 12, 2013; Label: HBK Gang; Format: Digital download

=== Music videos ===
- 2012: "Gettin' It" featuring Kool John – directed by Chris Simmons
- 2013: "STU Freestyle" – directed by tyCA
- 2013: "Go Crazy" – directed by Daghe
- 2013: "Bad Boyz" – directed by HBK GADGET
- 2013: "Losin" – directed by HBK GADGET
- 2013: "Quit Cattin" – directed by David Camarena
- 2013:"Rep That Gang" – directed by HBK GADGET
- 2013: "Father God" – directed by HBK GADGET
- 2014 "Bad Boyz" – directed by HBK GADGET
- 2014: "Cover Girl" – directed by HBK GADGET
- 2015: "L" – directed by HBK GADGET
- 2015: "Interlude" – directed by HBK GADGET
- 2015: "Interlude" – directed by HBK GADGET
- 2016: "Grande" – directed by HBK GADGET
- 2017: "Gucci" – directed by HBK GADGET
- 2017: "I Be" – directed by HBK GADGET
- 2017: "Back 2 Basics" – directed by HBK GADGET
- 2017: "Su Concert" – directed by HBK GADGET
- 2018: "Young Boy" – directed by HBK GADGET
- 2018: "Freestyle" – directed by HBK GADGET
- 2018: "Lee Pipes" – directed by HBK GADGET

== See also ==
- Hyphy
- List of West Coast hip hop artists
