= Jonn Hart =

American musician (born 1989)

- Born: Di'Jonn Gary Grizzell; August 28, 1985 (age 41); Oakland, California, U.S.
- Genre: R&B
- Occupations: Singer; songwriter
- Years active: 2012–present
- Labels: Cool Kid Cartel; Konvick Muzik Empire; Epic
- Website: jonnhart.com

Di'Jonn Gary Grizzell (born August 28, 1985), better known by his stage name Jonn Hart, is an American singer from Oakland, California. He is best known for his 2012 single "Who Booty" (featuring Iamsu!), which peaked at number 66 on the Billboard Hot 100. Upon its re-release by Epic Records in December of that year, the song was remixed with French Montana. Prior, he was a member of the band Tha Outfit.

== Life and career ==
Hart grew up in a musical family. His mother sang in choir and his stepfather was involved in gospel music and owned his own studio. In an interview with XXL, Hart stated that he used to visit the studio as a kid and realized at a very young age that he wanted to be involved with music. He graduated James Logan High School and continued his education at Morehouse College in Atlanta, Georgia.

He began his career with the R&B boy band Tha Outfit.

He pursued a solo career in 2012 and released the song "Who Booty", featuring Iamsu! on the original version, a remixed version featuring French Montana, and another featuring E-40.

In December 2013, Hart released a single titled "I Can't Feel My Leggz", which featured Shanell.

== Discography ==
=== Studio albums ===
- Straight from the Hart (2017)

=== Mixtapes ===
- Heart 2 Hart (2013)
- Heart 2 Hart 2 (2014)
- Heart 2 Hart 3 (2015)
- Cross My Hart (2018)
- Cross My Hart 2 (2019)

=== Extended plays ===
List of extended plays with selected details
Title	Details
Cool Kid Cartel Collection	Released: April 29, 2014; Label: Cool Kid Cartel; Format: Digital download
Cool Kid Cartel Collection 2	Released: December 9, 2014; Label: Cool Kid Cartel; Format: Digital download
Cool Kid Cartel Collection 3	Released: February 26, 2016; Label: Cool Kid Cartel; Format: Digital download
Mayhem	Released: July 1, 2016; Label: Cool Kid Cartel, Konvict Music; Format: Digital download

=== Singles ===
List of singles, with as lead artist, with selected chart positions and showing year released and album name
Title	Year	Peak chart positions				Album	
Title	Year	US	US R&B	US Rhythmic	US Pop	Album	
"Who Booty" (featuring Iamsu! or French Montana)	2013	66	20	1	31	Heart 2 Hart	
"Slip n Slide" (featuring Kid Ink)	2014	—	—	—	—	Cool Kid Cartel Collection	
"I Can't Feel My Leggz" (featuring Shanell)	2014	—	—	—	—	—N/a	
"Papi" (featuring Baby Bash and Baeza)	2016	—	—	—	—	—N/a	
"Back That Azz Up"	2016	—	—	—	—	—N/a	Cool Kid Cartel Collection 3
"New Chick"	2016	—	—	—	—		
"Whatchu Finna Do"	2017	—	—	—	—	Heart 2 Hart 4	
"Whistle" (featuring Too Short and Juelz Santana)	2018	—	—	34	—	Cross My Hart	
