= Function (song) =

Single by E-40 featuring YG, Iamsu! and Problem

from the album The Block Brochure: Welcome to the Soil 2
- Released: February 17, 2012
- Length: 4:19
- Label: Heavy on the Grind Ent.; EMI
- Songwriters: Morris Dollison Jr.; Quincy Jones III; Shay Jones; Marcellus McCarver; Earl Stevens
- Producer: Trend

E-40 singles chronology
"Bitch" (2010)	"Function" (2012)	"I Don't Fuck with You" (2014)

YG singles chronology
"Toot It and Boot It" (2010)	"Function" (2012)	"Act Right" (2013)

"Function" is the third single from E-40's 16th studio album The Block Brochure: Welcome to the Soil 2. The song features fellow rappers YG, Iamsu! and Problem. The song is produced by Trend of the group League of Star 2012. The song was certified Gold by the RIAA on November 3, 2016.

== Music video ==
The video was released on March 5, 2012, via E-40's account on YouTube. An audio of the song was also released to YouTube on January 14 and has over 4.5 million views. Waka Flocka Flame, Kreayshawn, Roach Gigz, Bobby Brackins, Philthy Rich, B-Legit, and DJ Amen make cameo appearances in the music video.

== Critical reception ==
When reviewing for The Block Brochure: Welcome to the Soil 2, Allmusic stated that "Minimal bass and scrappy attitude turn "Function" into a five-star pusher anthem." RapReviews also gave the song a positive review by saying "The Trend produced song is all the way new school with YG, IAmSu and Problem. 40 still steals the show though."

== Remixes ==
The official remix features Chris Brown, Young Jeezy, Problem, French Montana & Red Cafe. Rapper Tyga freestyled the song on his Well Done 3 mixtape.

== Chart performance ==
On March 24, "Function" reached No. 62 on the U.S. Billboard Hot R&B/Hip-Hop Songs chart, before the album was released. "Function" has also peaked at No. 42 on the Billboard Rap chart. It debuted on the Billboard Bubbling Under Hot 100 Singles chart at No. 22 on May 13, 2012. It is E-40's first appearance on that chart since 2008's "Wake It Up", featuring Akon.

== Charts ==
Chart (2012)	Peak position
US Bubbling Under Hot 100 (Billboard)	21
US Hot R&B/Hip-Hop Songs (Billboard)	69
US Hot Rap Songs (Billboard)	22
US Rhythmic Airplay (Billboard)	25

== Certifications ==
Region	Certification	Certified units/sales
United States (RIAA)	Gold	500,000^{‡}
^{‡} Sales+streaming figures based on certification alone.
