= Gas Pedal =

Single by Sage the Gemini featuring Iamsu!

from the album Remember Me
- Released: March 21, 2013
- Recorded: 2012
- Genre: Hip hop; hyphy
- Length: 3:28
- Label: Black Money; Republic
- Songwriters: Dominic Wynn Woods; Sudan Williams
- Producer: Sage the Gemini

Sage the Gemini singles chronology
"Red Nose" (2013)	"Gas Pedal" (2013)	"Kiss It" (2013)

Iamsu! singles chronology
"Who Booty" (2012)	"Gas Pedal" (2013)	"Only That Real" (2014)

Music video
- "Gas Pedal" on YouTube

"Gas Pedal" is a song by American rapper Sage the Gemini, featuring guest vocals from fellow Bay Area rapper Iamsu!. It was released by Republic Records on March 21, 2013 as the second single from the former's debut studio album, Remember Me. It was produced by Sage the Gemini, while both performers co-wrote the song.

"Gas Pedal" peaked at number 29 on the Billboard Hot 100, making this the first top 40 hit for both artists. It also reached the top ten on the Hot R&B/Hip-Hop Songs and Hot Rap Songs charts, at numbers six and four, respectively. An official remix for the song was released featuring Canadian singer Justin Bieber.

== Music video ==
Directed by SUJ, the video is set in a barely lit mansion where Sage and Iamsu! are dressed in tuxedos surrounded by various women with blank expressions on their face. A woman wearing a red veil wrapped around her face catches Sage's attention and asks for her to be brought over. When the woman is brought over to Sage, she stands still only to dance a little before returning to being still again. The video premiered on the artist's YouTube page on March 21, 2013.

== Live performance ==
Sage and Iamsu! made their U.S. television debut performing "Gas Pedal" on the Late Show with David Letterman on March 27, 2013. The performance garnered little response from the audience, but Sage was a good sport about his performance during an interview he had with RapFix Live: "But it was tight, though, 'cause you could tell it was a real audience, 'cause as soon as I was like, 'How y’all doing out there tonight?' They said, 'Ahhhh,'" Sage continued.

== Commercial performance ==
"Gas Pedal" debuted at number 58 on US Billboard Hot 100 for the week of August 10, 2013. Four weeks later, it peaked at number 29 for the week of September 7 and spent a total of twenty-five weeks on the chart. It reached the top ten on the Hot R&B/Hip-Hop Songs chart, moving four spots from number 11 to number 7 for the week of August 17. It peaked at number 6 the week after on August 24. As of April 5, 2014, the song sold 1.4 million downloads, according to Nielsen SoundScan.

In Canada, the song debuted at number 96 for the week of August 31, 2013 and peaked at number 92 the week after before leaving the chart. It re-entered the chart for the week of January 4, 2014 at number 84 and reached a new peak at number 59 the week after on January 11.

== Remix ==
On December 20, 2013, an official remix for the song was released that featured Canadian singer Justin Bieber performing the opening rap verse and a bridge before the second chorus which peaked at number 100 in the UK Singles Chart.

== Charts ==
=== Weekly charts ===
Weekly chart performance
Chart (2013–2014)	Peak position
Australia Urban (ARIA)	17
Belgium (Ultratip Bubbling Under Flanders) Remix	87
Belgium Urban (Ultratop Flanders) Remix	33
Canada Hot 100 (Billboard)	59
UK Singles (Official Charts) Remix	100
UK Hip Hop/R&B (Official Charts) Remix	18
US Billboard Hot 100	29
US Hot R&B/Hip-Hop Songs (Billboard)	6
US Rhythmic Airplay (Billboard)	5

=== Year-end charts ===
Annual chart rankings
Chart (2013)	Position
US Hot R&B/Hip-Hop Songs (Billboard)	30
US Streaming Songs (Billboard)	52
Chart (2014)	Position
US Hot R&B/Hip-Hop Songs (Billboard)	64

== Certifications ==
Region	Certification	Certified units/sales
New Zealand (RMNZ)	Platinum	30,000^{‡}
United Kingdom (BPI)	Silver	200,000^{‡}
United States (RIAA)	3× Platinum	3,000,000^{‡}
^{‡} Sales+streaming figures based on certification alone.
