= LoveRance =

American rapper

- Born: Rance Love Oliver II; September 6, 1989 (age 37)
- Origin: San Francisco, California, U.S.
- Genre: West Coast hip-hop
- Occupations: Rapper; record producer; singer; songwriter; disc jockey
- Years active: 2010–present
- Labels: EMPIRE; Interscope
- Formerly of: The HBK Gang
- Website: www.loverance.tumblr.com

Rance Love Oliver II (arranged as LoveRance; born September 6, 1989) is an American rapper, record producer and DJ from San Francisco, California. He is best known for his 2011 single "Up!" (featuring 50 Cent), which peaked within the top 50 of the Billboard Hot 100. He joined the hip hop group HBK Gang prior to its release, which was led by the song's producer, Iamsu!. Oliver signed with Interscope Records following the song's success, although the label only released its follow-up, "Akup" (featuring Tyga and Problem), before parting ways with the rapper.

== Musical career ==
"Up!" was released independently in May 2011. The song first gained virality online and in nightclubs before peaking at number 46 on the Billboard Hot 100, number three on the Hot R&B/Hip-Hop Songs chart, and number two on the Hot Rap Songs in May of the following year. As Oliver was a member of the Bay Area collective The HBK Gang, the song is credited as the group's mainstream commercial breakthrough, serving as a catalyst for its other members to gain further recognition. The song was produced by group leader Iamsu!, who guest performed on the song's original version alongside group cohort Skipper. As "Up!" gained wider radio airplay, Oliver was signed to Interscope Records by the label's then-executive Larry Jackson in late 2011, and both aforementioned guest performers were replaced by 50 Cent for the song's re-release as a single. "UP!" was uploaded to his Vevo account on January 31, 2012. The video takes place in the Bay Area and most of the video is recorded inside a night club. The group's manager, Chioke "Stretch" McCoy, stated that:

[The song's release was in] the pre-streaming era, a weird time — I didn’t know how it would all change, but I knew the consumption of music was changing"

His debut mixtape, Freak of the Industry was released in December 2012 and contained guest appearances from Tyga, Problem, and Omarion; it failed to garner any further commercial response, along with his subsequent releases.

== Discography ==
=== Mixtapes ===
List of mixtapes
Title	Album details
Freak Of The Industry	Release Date: December 2, 2012; Hosted by DJ Skee; Format: Digital download
Freak Show Rancey	Release Date: March 31, 2015; Format: Digital download

=== Singles ===
List of singles, as lead artist, with selected chart positions, showing year released and album name
Title	Year	Peak chart positions			Album
Title	Year	US	US R&B	US Rap	Album
"UP!" (featuring 50 Cent)	2011	46	3	2	non-album singles
"Akup" (featuring Tyga & Problem)	2012	—	—	—	non-album singles
"On Her"	2015	—	—	—	Freak Show Rancey
"Let Me Tell You"	2016	—	—	—	TBA
"Drill"	2016	—	—	—	TBA
