= P-Lo =

- Born: Paulo Rodriguez; May 7, 1991 (age 35)
- Education: Pinole Valley High School
- Musical career
- Origin: Pinole, California, U.S.
- Genre: Hip hop
- Occupations: Rapper; producer
- Years active: 2008–present
- Label: Empire
- Formerly of: The HBK Gang

Paulo Rodriguez (born May 7, 1991), known professionally as P-Lo, is an American rapper and producer from Pinole, California.

On May 7, 2025, his 34th birthday, he was awarded the keys to the city and Pinole City Council declared May 7 to be P-Lo Day. He released his album Out the Box in August 2026.
