= Sage the Gemini =

American rapper (born 1992)

- Born: Dominic Wynn Woods; June 20, 1992 (age 33); San Francisco, California, U.S.
- Origin: Fairfield, California, U.S.
- Genres: Hip-hop
- Occupations: Rapper; singer; songwriter; record producer
- Works: Discography; production
- Years active: 2007–present
- Labels: Global Gemini; HBK; Atlantic; Republic; Black Money
- Member of: The HBK Gang
- Children: 2
- Website: sagethegeminiofficial.com

Dominic Wynn Woods (born June 20, 1992), known professionally as Sage the Gemini (/seɪdʒ/), is an American rapper and record producer. He is a member of the Bay Area hip-hop collective HBK Gang, and is the only member of the group alongside Kehlani and LoveRance to have signed to a major label.

Woods is best known for his 2013 singles "Gas Pedal" (featuring Iamsu!) and "Red Nose," which peaked at numbers 29 and 59 on the Billboard Hot 100, respectively. Both songs preceded his debut studio album Remember Me (2014), which was released by Republic Records and saw moderate critical and commercial reception. That same year, his guest appearance alongside Lookas on Flo Rida's 2014 single, "Going Down For Real (GDFR)" peaked at number eight on the chart and received quadruple platinum certification by the Recording Industry Association of America (RIAA).

== Life and career ==
=== 1992–2012: Early life and career beginnings ===
Dominic Wynn Woods was born on June 20, 1992, in San Francisco. His family moved to Fairfield when he was 6–7 years old. He started recording at the age of eleven with his brother after he bought a microphone from Gordon's Music and Sound shop in Fairfield. The first track he recorded, at 14, was titled "Made In China". Woods took the name Sage the Gemini due to the color of his eyes and his zodiac sign.

In 2008, Sage released his first single, "You Should Know" on MySpace. It became a viral hit, generating over three million views worldwide. He then joined Black Money Music Group. Being close friends with rapper Iamsu!, he also joined The HBK Gang, or the Heartbreak Gang.

=== 2013–present: Remember Me ===
In March 2013, Sage released the singles "Red Nose" and "Gas Pedal" featuring Iamsu!, the latter has reached number 29 on the US Billboard Hot 100, making it his first top 40 hit; it also reached number six on the Hot R&B/Hip-Hop Songs. The songs immediately became hits and gained substantial airplay, which persuaded Republic Records to sign a deal with him in August 2013. The Recording Industry Association of America certified "Red Nose" Gold and "Gas Pedal" Platinum. On March 25, 2014, Sage released his debut studio album, Remember Me.

In October 2014, he was featured on Flo Rida's single "G.D.F.R.", which peaked at number eight on the Billboard Hot 100. In July 2017, Sage released his debut mixtape, Morse Code, which includes the Gold certified single "Now and Later". "Now and Later" peaked at the #1 spot on the urban charts in Australia and the UK.

== Personal life ==
Woods was 19 when he had his first child, a daughter, in 2011. He dated Jordin Sparks for a short time in 2015. His second daughter was born in 2017 to an unnamed woman.

== Discography ==
- Remember Me (2014)
- Morse Code (2017)
