= Rich Homie Quan discography =

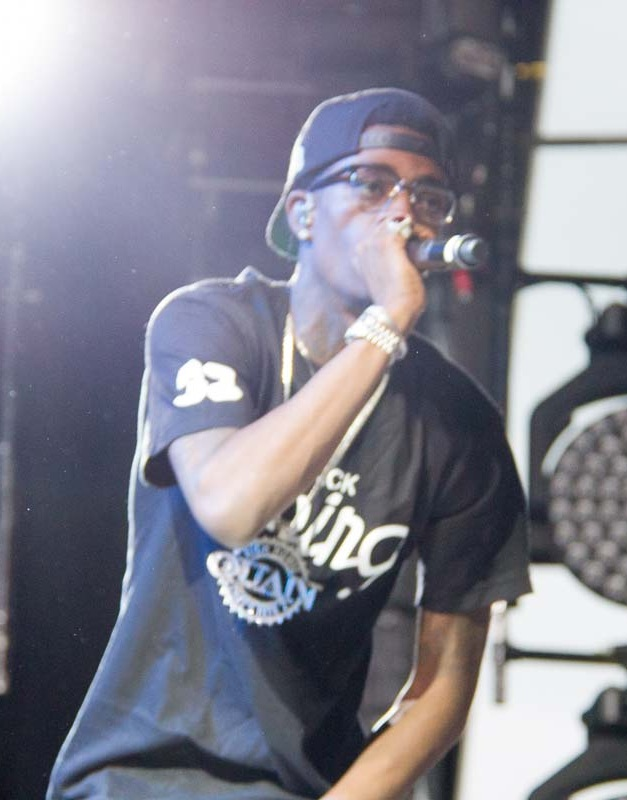
- Rich Homie Quan performing at the Under the Influence of Music Tour in 2014.
- Studio albums: 2
- EPs: 4
- Singles: 23
- Mixtapes: 9

American rapper Rich Homie Quan released two studio albums, four extended plays, nine mixtapes and twenty-three singles (in addition to twelve as a featured artist) during his lifetime.

== Albums ==
=== Studio albums ===
List of albums with selected details
Title	Album details	peak chart positions		
Title	Album details	US	US R&B/ HH	US Rap
Rich as in Spirit	Released: March 16, 2018; Label: RAIS LLC, Motown; Format: Digital download, streaming	32	19	15
Forever Goin In	Released: October 4, 2024; Label: Rich Homie Entertainment; Format: Digital download, streaming	—	—	—
GIA: Going In Afterlife	Released: October 4, 2026; Label: Rich Homie Entertainment; Format: Digital download, streaming	—	—	—

=== Mixtapes ===
List of mixtapes, with selected chart positions
Title	Album details	Peak chart positions		
Title	Album details	US	US R&B/ HH	US Rap
I Go In on Every Song	Released: April 1, 2012; Label: T.I.G. Entertainment; Format: Digital download	—	—	—
Still Goin In	Released: September 27, 2012; Label: T.I.G. Entertainment; Format: Digital download	—	—	—
Still Goin In: Reloaded	Released: February 8, 2013; Label: T.I.G. Entertainment; Format: Digital download	—	63	—
Trust God F*ck 12 (with Gucci Mane)	Released: October 17, 2013; Label: 1017 Records, 101 Distribution; Format: Digital download	—	—	—
I Promise I Will Never Stop Going In	Released: November 26, 2013; Label: T.I.G. Entertainment; Format: Digital download	110	42	25
If You Ever Think I Will Stop Goin' in Ask RR (Royal Rich)	Released: April 28, 2015; Label: T.I.G. Entertainment; Format: Digital download	—	—	—
DTSpacely Made This	Released: September 16, 2015; Label: T.I.G. Entertainment; Format: Digital download	—	—	—
ABTA: Still Going In	Released: November 14, 2015; Label: T.I.G. Entertainment; Format: Digital download	—	—	—
Back to the Basics	Released: April 14, 2017; Label: RAIS LLC, Motown; Format: Digital download, streaming	84	42	—

=== Greatest hits albums ===
List of greatest hits albums
Title	Album details	Certifications
Legacy of Hits	Released: October 3, 2025; Label: Think It's a Game Records; Formats: Streaming, digital download	RIAA: Gold

== Extended plays ==
List of extended plays
Title	EP details
Summer Sampler	Released: May 19, 2015; Label: T.I.G. Entertainment; Formats: Digital download, streaming
The Gif	Released: October 4, 2018; Label: RAIS; Formats: Digital download, streaming
Coma	Released: December 13, 2019; Label: RAIS; Formats: Digital download, streaming
Family & Mula	Released: October 4, 2022; Label: Rich Homie Entertainment, LLC; Formats: Digital download, streaming

== Singles ==
=== As lead artist ===
List of singles as lead artist, with selected chart positions, showing year released and album name
Title	Year	Peak chart positions									Certifications	Album
Title	Year	US	US R&B/HH	US Rap	AUS	CAN	FRA	GER	SCO	UK	Certifications	Album
"Difference"	2013	—	—	—	—	—	—	—	—	—		Still Goin In: Reloaded
"Type of Way"	2013	50	12	8	—	—	—	—	—	—	RIAA: Gold	Still Goin In: Reloaded
"Walk Thru" (featuring Problem)	2014	74	31	20	—	—	—	—	—	—	RIAA: Platinum	I Promise I Will Never Stop Going In
"Blah Blah Blah"	2014	—	—	—	—	—	—	—	—	—	RIAA: Gold	I Promise I Will Never Stop Going In
"Flex (Ooh, Ooh, Ooh)"	2015	26	8	4	—	93	—	—	—	—	RIAA: 4× Platinum; RMNZ: Platinum	If You Ever Think I Will Stop Goin' In Ask Double R
"Ride Out" (with Kid Ink, Tyga, Wale and YG)	2015	70	22	14	44	48	51	21	57	70	RIAA: Gold; MC: Platinum	Furious 7: Original Motion Picture Soundtrack
"The Most"	2015	—	—	—	—	—	—	—	—	—		Non-album single
"Replay"	2017	—	—	—	—	—	—	—	—	—		Back to the Basics
"Gamble"	2017	—	— (Note: "Gamble" did not enter the Hot R&B/Hip-Hop Songs chart, but peaked at number 38 on the R&B/Hip-Hop Airplay chart, which is an airplay only component.)	—	—	—	—	—	—	—		Back to the Basics
"Changed"	2017	—	—	—	—	—	—	—	—	—		Rich as in Spirit
"34"	2018	—	—	—	—	—	—	—	—	—		Rich as in Spirit
"—" denotes a recording that did not chart.

=== As featured artist ===
List of singles as featured artist, with selected chart positions and certifications, showing year released and album name
Title	Year	Peak chart positions				Certifications	Album
Title	Year	US	US R&B/HH	US Rap	UK	Certifications	Album
"My Nigga" (YG featuring Jeezy and Rich Homie Quan)	2013	19	5	3	53	RIAA: 4× Platinum; BPI: Gold; GLF: Platinum; MC: Gold; RMNZ: Platinum	My Krazy Life
"Ghetto" (August Alsina featuring Rich Homie Quan)	2013	— (Note: "Ghetto" did not enter the Billboard Hot 100, but peaked at number fifteen on the Bubbling Under Hot 100 Singles chart.)	37	—	—	RIAA: Gold	Downtown: Life Under the Gun
"I Know" (Yo Gotti featuring Rich Homie Quan)	2013	— (Note: "I Know" did not enter the Billboard Hot 100, but peaked at number one on the Bubbling Under Hot 100 Singles chart.)	31	19	—	RIAA: Gold	I Am
"Lifestyle" (Rich Gang featuring Young Thug and Rich Homie Quan)	2014	16	4	3	—	RIAA: Platinum; BPI: Silver; RMNZ: Platinum	Non-album single
"Right Back" (DJ Drama featuring Jeezy, Young Thug and Rich Homie Quan)	2014	—	—	—	—		Quality Street Music 2
"Like a Man" (Boosie Badazz featuring Rich Homie Quan)	2014	—	—	—	—		Touch Down 2 Cause Hell
"Mamacita" (Travis Scott featuring Rich Homie Quan and Young Thug)	2014	— (Note: "Mamacita" did not enter the Billboard Hot 100, but peaked at number nine on the Bubbling Under Hot 100 Singles chart.)	26	22	—	RIAA: Platinum; MC: Platinum	Days Before Rodeo
"Save Dat Money" (Lil Dicky featuring Fetty Wap and Rich Homie Quan)	2015	71	23	14	—	RIAA: 2× Platinum; RMNZ: Gold	Professional Rapper
"Everyday" (Rim'k featuring Rich Homie Quan)	2015	—	—	—	—		Monster Tape
"Im Sayin" (Omarion featuring Rich Homie Quan)	2015	—	—	—	—		Care Package 3
"Finesse" (Jim Jones featuring Rich Homie Quan, ASAP Ferg and Desiigner)	2016	—	—	—	—		The Kitchen
"—" denotes a recording that did not chart.

== Other charted songs ==
List of songs, with selected chart positions, showing year released and album name
Title	Year	Peak chart positions	Certifications	Album
Title	Year	US R&B/HH	Certifications	Album
"Choices"	2013	— (Note: "Choices" did not enter the Hot R&B/Hip-Hop Songs chart, but peaked at number eight on the Bubbling Under R&B/Hip-Hop Singles chart.)		Still Goin In: Reloaded
"Get TF Out My Face" (featuring Young Thug)	2014	— (Note: "Get TF Out My Face" did not enter the Hot R&B/Hip-Hop Songs chart, but peaked at number three on the Bubbling Under R&B/Hip-Hop Singles chart.)	RIAA: Gold	I Promise I Will Never Stop Going In
"—" denotes a recording that did not chart or was not released in that territory.

== Guest appearances ==
List of non-single guest appearances, with other performing artists, showing year released and album name
Title	Year	Other artist(s)	Album
"I Heard"	2013	Gucci Mane	Trap House III
"Can't Trust Her	2013	Gucci Mane	Trap House III
"Chasin' Paper"	2013	Gucci Mane, Young Thug	Trap House III
"Jumpin' Off Texa$"	2013	Trinidad James	10 PC Mild
"Extra"	2013	2 Chainz	B.O.A.T.S. II: Me Time
"She A Soldier"	2013	Gucci Mane, Young Thug	Diary of a Trap God
"I Heard"	2013	Gucci Mane, Young Thug	Diary of a Trap God
"2 Many"	2013	Doe B	Baby Jesus
"Car Smell"	2013	Gucci Mane, Peewee Longway	Money Pounds Ammunition
"Say A Prayer"	2014	Gucci Mane	Brick Factory Vol.1
"My Nigga" (Remix)	2014	YG, Lil Wayne, Meek Mill, Nicki Minaj	My Krazy Life
"Say A Prayer"	2014	Gucci Mane, Pizzle	C.N.O.T.E Vs Gucci Collectors Edition
"I Heard"	2014	Gucci Mane	C.N.O.T.E Vs Gucci Collectors Edition
"Chasen Paper"	2014	Gucci Mane, Young Thug	C.N.O.T.E Vs Gucci Collectors Edition
"Word Around Town"	2014	Kevin Gates	Luca Brasi 2
"YRH"	2014	Migos	No Label 2
"Show 'Em How to Do It"	2014	Bankroll Fresh	Life of a Hot Boy
"Make Me Something"	2014	T.I., Dro, Spodee, Shad da God	G.D.O.D. II
"We Good"	2014	Fabolous	The Young OG Project
"I Might"	2015	Young Jeezy	Gangsta Party
"No Problems"	2015	Gucci Mane, Peewee Longway	The Spot (Soundtrack)
"Criminals"	2015	Trae tha Truth, Don Primo	Tha Truth
"Enemiez" (Remix)	2016	Keke Palmer, Jeremih	none
"Beat It"	2016	Blac Youngsta	none
"MUDD"	2016	Boosie Badazz, Yung Bleu	none
"Round and Round"	2016	Mozzy, Iamsu!, Lil Blood	Mandatory Check
"Champagne Shower"	2016	DJ Esco, Future	Project E.T.
"Big Money" (C4 Remix)	2016	DJ Drama, Lil Uzi Vert, Skeme	Quality Street Music 2
"Christmas List"	2018	Boosie Badazz, YFN Lucci	Savage Holidays
"Rich Homie Quando"	2018	Quando Rondo	Life After Fame
"Celebrate"	2019	DaBaby	Baby on Baby
