= Empire Distribution =

American record label, publisher and distribution company

- Genre: Hip-hop; Afrobeat; R&B; dance; reggaeton; country; pop; Latin alternative
- Founded: 2010 in San Francisco, California
- Founder: Ghazi Shami
- Headquarters: San Francisco, US
- Area served: Worldwide
- Key people: Ghazi Shami (CEO); Nima Etminan (COO); Tina Davis (President)
- Number of employees: 200 (2024)
- Divisions: Empire Distribution; Empire Publishing; Empire; Empire Africa; Empire Latino; Empire Nashville; Above All
- Website: empi.re

Empire Distribution, Records and Publishing Inc. (stylized as EMPIRE) is an independent American record label, distribution and publishing company founded in 2010 by Ghazi Shami. Based in San Francisco, Empire has offices in New York, London, Lagos, and Johannesburg in addition to recording studios in San Francisco and New York.

Shami, a San Francisco native with a background in music and tech, founded Empire as a digital distribution company focused on hip-hop and rap. Developing proprietary software that allowed managers and artists to easily track airplay and sales, Empire paid monthly royalties to artists, many of whom had not previously earned digital revenue, and gained early support from the Bay Area's artist community.

In 2014, Shami, known as Ghazi, launched the Empire label. Empire Africa, Empire Latino, and Empire Nashville divisions were later established. Since its founding—in partnership with artists and artist labels—Empire has released music by artists including Kendrick Lamar, Bebe Rexha, Anderson .Paak, Shaboozey, Fat Joe, Tyga, Olamide, Asake, Fireboy DML, XXXTentacion, G-Dragon, Philthy Rich, Young Dolph, Key Glock, King Von, Tink, Black Sherif, Yung Bleu, D Smoke, T-Pain, Snoop Dogg, DRAM, Cardi B and Emtee, among others. Empire Publishing was founded in 2020.

== History ==
=== 2010-2014: Founding, early success ===
Empire was founded by Ghazi Shami. Raised in San Francisco, he grew up listening to Bay Area artists such as Too Short, Spice 1, RBL Posse, Souls of Mischief, Luniz, JT the Bigga Figga, and Rappin' 4-Tay. Equally interested in music and technology, in college he worked at the tech companies Sun Microsystems, Eloquent Technologies and Audio Highway; he later worked at Hyde Street Studios, where he engineered and mixed music by artists including Messy Marv, Planet Asia and Too Short.

In 2006, he was hired at INgrooves Music Group, an independent distribution and marketing company. While he had written code and built out streaming media sites since he was a teenager, at INgrooves, he learned about the intricacies of digital distribution, artist contracts, and royalties. Helping to build the company's rap division, he signed DIY artists representative of the Bay Area sound and culture, often introducing them to online revenue streams.

Ghazi founded Empire from his home in the Potrero neighborhood of San Francisco in 2010. In a 2019 interview, he said: "This company wouldn't exist if I wasn't born and bred in the Bay; in SF and Silicon Valley. This company is as much a software company as it is a music company. It’d be a disservice to the roots, to the origin, to everything that I stand for, if this company wasn't firmly planted or rooted here."

Initially focused on rap, Empire's backend technology bypassed the existing digital distribution system and delivered music directly to streaming and retail platforms quickly to capitalize on the viral momentum of the genre's traditional rapid-fire releases. Contracts were non-exclusive and proprietary software allowed managers and artists to easily track royalties, which were paid monthly. The company's core practices, in addition to Ghazi's relationships, attracted artists, and as Empire gained traction, Ghazi hired Nima Etminan as his second-in-command. Etminan later became the company's COO.

=== 2014-2020: Empire Records, Empire Latino, Empire Nashville ===
With its digital distribution platform successful, Empire established Empire Records. Among others, the label released Anderson .Paak's album Malibu, which earned .Paak a Grammy nomination in the Best New Artist category, as well as Fat Joe's "All The Way Up" and DRAM's "Broccoli." Young Dolph turned down a $22 million major label deal to sign with Empire and remain independent. In an interview with Variety, Dolph said: "Empire is on deck with people who love to do this shit just as much as I do...whether you got money to deal with it or no money to deal with it, the best relationships are going to be the ones where you understand each other."

In 2017, XXXTentacion's debut album, 17, was released on Empire. It charted at number two on the Billboard 200. His sophomore album was released on Capitol. He returned to re-sign with Empire a month before his death; The New York Times reported that the deal was worth $10 million. XXXTentacion's posthumous album, Skins, debuted at #1 on the Billboard album chart.

In 2018, Tina Davis, previously an artist manager and a head of A&R at Def Jam, was named SVP of A&R, and a partnership with L.A. Reid's Hitco was announced. King Von's Empire-distributed song "Crazy Story" was a 3× platinum viral hit. He subsequently signed with Empire, releasing the mixtape, Grandson, which became one of the label's most successful releases. Empire also worked with Tyga in 2018; the track "Taste", was 9× platinum as of 2023.

Empire began working with Latino artists including Tego Calderón and Luis Enrique in 2012, and in 2018 established Empire Latino. In 2019, Empire Latino had its first hit with Puerto Rican reggaeton artist Jay Wheeler; as of 2023, his song La Curiosidad was 8× platinum.

Empire Nashville, a country music division, was founded in 2019, "blazing a trail for Black country artists."

=== 2020 - present: Empire Publishing, Empire Africa, Shaboozey ===
In 2020, after developing proprietary software specific to music publishing that provided transparency similar to Empire's royalty software, Empire established a publishing division. Initial signings included Illmind, Nebu Kiniza, Dr Zeus and Empire artists Young Dolph, Key Glock, Mozzy, Fireboy DML, Yung Bleu and RJMrLA.

In partnership with Olamide and his label, YBNL Nation, Empire Africa's first signing was Nigerian Afrobeats artist Fireboy DML. His 2021 single "Peru", remixed by Ed Sheeran, was a global hit. With subsequent signings including Asake, Burna Boy, BNXN and Kizz Daniel, Empire Africa became a preeminent Afrobeats label; on Nigeria's year-end TurnTable Charts, Empire had the top three artists, the top two songs, and the top album. Empire releases held the #1 position on the Nigerian charts for 35 weeks over the course of the year.

Empire began investing in the Detroit hip-hop scene not long after the company was founded. In a 2022 interview with Billboard, Ghazi said he felt a strong connection between San Francisco and Detroit. The label signed Babyface Ray in 2017, and by 2022 had signed 10 artists, including Peezy, Babytron, Payroll Giovanni, and Rio Da Yung OG. Peezy's "2 Million Up" went viral on TikTok and hit seven Billboard charts, including the Mainstream R&B/Hip-Hop Airplay, Rap Airplay and Hot R&B/Hip-Hop Songs.

In October 2022, Empire acquired the Bay area-founded dance label, Dirtybird. In January 2023, a partnership with the Web3 investment platform, Nebula, was announced. It was also announced that Money Man, who was paid in Bitcoin when he signed with Empire in 2021, would release his EP on the Nebula platform.

In June 2023, Davis was named president of the company.

In May 2024, Shaboozey—who signed with Empire in 2021—released the album Where I've Been, Isn't Where I'm Going. The album was a worldwide hit, with the single "A Bar Song (Tipsy)" hitting #1 on the Billboard Country Airplay chart. It held the top position on the Billboard Hot 100 for 16 non-consecutive weeks, tying the 2020s record for the most weeks at #1 in November. He was nominated for five 2025 Grammy Awards, including Song of the Year (for "A Bar Song (Tipsy)") and Best New Artist.

== Awards and nominations ==
=== Grammy Awards ===
Year	Nominee / work	Award	Result
2015	"Out of Many, One Music" (Shaggy)	Best Reggae Album	Nominated
2016	"Strictly Roots" (Morgan Heritage)	Best Reggae Album	Won
2017	"Malibu" (Anderson .Paak)	Best New Artist	Nominated
2017	"Malibu" (Anderson .Paak)	Best Urban Contemporary Album	Nominated
2017	"All The Way Up" (Fat Joe & Remy Ma)	Best Rap Performance	Nominated
2017	"All The Way Up" (Fat Joe & Remy Ma)	Best Rap Song	Nominated
2017	"Broccoli" (DRAM)	Best Rap/Sung Performance	Nominated
2017	"Rose Petals EP" (J Boog)	Best Reggae Album	Nominated

== Notable artists ==
- 2nd Nature
- 9th Wonder
- 50 Cent
- Aaliyah
- Ab-Soul
- A. Chal
- Adam Lambert
- Afgan
- Alexis & Fido
- ALLBLACK
- Amanda Perez
- Amber Liu
- Anderson .Paak
- Andre Nickatina
- Asake
- Bankroll Mafia
- BabyTron
- B-Legit
- Bebe Rexha
- Berner
- B.o.B
- Bobby V
- Benny the Butcher
- Boosie Badazz
- Black Sherif
- BONES
- Borderline
- Brockhampton
- Busta Rhymes
- Che’Nelle
- Christina Aguilera
- Chronixx
- Clyde Carson
- Crooked I
- Daz Dillinger
- Denise Julia
- DRAM
- Diamond D
- Dinah Jane
- Dizzy Wright
- DJ Kay Slay
- DJ Pauly D
- Doe B
- Drakeo the Ruler
- Dounia
- Dru Hill
- D Smoke
- EarthGang
- Ellise
- Emilio Rojas
- Eric Bellinger
- Emtee
- Ester Dean
- Fashawn
- Fireboy DML
- Flipsyde
- Freddie Gibbs
- Glasses Malone
- G-Dragon
- Hayley Kiyoko
- Hopsin
- Hustle Gang
- Iamsu!
- Iggy Azalea
- Jacquees
- J Dilla
- J. Valentine
- Justina Valentine
- Jacob Latimore
- Jake Miller
- Je'Von Evans
- Jarren Benton
- Jesse Boykins III
- Jewel
- Jim Jones
- Jay Critch
- Joji
- Jake Paul
- Kanye West
- Keak Da Sneak
- Kilo Kish
- King Von
- Kizz Daniel
- Kankan
- KiDi
- Konshens
- Kurupt
- Kwengface
- Lamont Sincere
- Lil Duval
- Lloyd
- Lloyd Banks
- Loote
- Lyrica Anderson
- Lucki
- Mac Dre
- MAJOR.
- Mandy Rain
- Mann
- Mario
- Mars
- Members Only
- Messy Marv
- Mistah F.A.B.
- Mitchy Slick
- MO3
- Mozzy
- Mack Wilds
- NIKI
- Niko Moon
- Nef the Pharaoh
- Nefew
- No Malice
- Olamide
- Pouya
- Philthy Rich
- Pia Mia
- Phresher
- PnB Rock
- Popcaan
- Pro Haley
- Problem
- Pleasure P
- Raisa
- Rakeem Miles
- Rapper Big Pooh
- Rapsody
- Rayven Justice
- Riff Raff
- RBL Posse
- Remy Ma
- Rich Brian
- Rich Homie Quan
- RXKNephew
- Robin Thicke
- Robyn Ottolini
- Rocko
- Robb Banks
- Rotimi
- Saba
- Sean Garrett
- Sean Kingston
- Selfish
- Shaboozey
- Shaggy
- Show Banga
- Skeme
- Skyzoo & Torae
- Slim Thug
- SOB X RBE
- SpaceGhostPurrp
- Supa Bwe
- Starlito
- Styles P
- Tank
- Tenille Arts
- That Girl Lay Lay (rapper)
- The Alchemist
- The Foreign Exchange
- The Grouch & Eligh
- The Jacka
- Trae tha Truth
- Travis Garland
- Trevor Jackson
- Trinidad James
- Troy Ave
- Turf Talk
- Tyga
- Tyra B
- Tink
- Victoria Monet
- VannDa
- WC
- We Are Toonz
- Wande Coal
- XXXTentacion
- Yaw Tog
- Young Chop
- Young Dolph
- Yung Beef
- Yung Bleu
- Zion I
- Zion y Lennox
- Z-Ro

== Selected discography ==
Year	Cat	Title	Artist(s)	Details	Certifications
2010	ERE	Authenticity	The Foreign Exchange	Oct 12, 2010	#145 on the Billboard 200 #23 US Top R&B/Hip-Hop Albums
2011	ERE	Setbacks	ScHoolboy Q	Jan 11, 2011	#100 on the US Billboard 200
2011	ERE	Longterm Mentality	Ab-Soul	April 5, 2011	#32 on the US Top Heatseekers #73 on the US Top R&B/Hip Hop Albums
2011	ERE	Section.80	Kendrick Lamar	July 2, 2011	#113 on the US Billboard 200 #1 on the US Top Heatseekers Albums
2011	ERE	Charity Starts At Home	Phonte	Sep 27, 2011	
2011	ERE	In None We Trust	Crooked I	Nov 17, 2011	
2011	ERE	Gift Of Gab 2	Rocko	Nov 24, 2011	
2012	ERE	Dirty Slums	Slum Village	Mar 27, 2012	
2012	ERE	Stoner's EP	Snoop Dogg	April 17, 2012	#31 on the US Independent Albums #33 on the US Top R&B/Hip Hop Albums
2012	ERE	Don't Be S.A.F.E.	Trinidad James	Sep 18, 2012	#103 on the US Billboard 200 #8 on the US Top Heatseekers Albums
2012	ERE	Baby Face Killa	Freddie Gibbs	Sep 25, 2012	
2013	ERE	Still Goin In (Reloaded)	Rich Homie Quan	Feb 8, 2013	Named tenth best mixtape of 2013 by Rolling Stone.
2013	ERE	The Year of the Underdogz	Young Noble & Gage Gully	May 7, 2013	
2013	ERE	West Coast Gangsta Shit	Daz Dillinger and WC	June 19, 2013	
2013	ERE	ESGN (Evil Seeds Grow Naturally)	Freddie Gibbs	June 20, 2013	#8 on US Top Heatseekers Albums #24 on US Top R&B/Hip-Hop Albums
2013	ERE	Cold Turkey	Starlito	July 2, 2013	
2013	ERE108	Apex Predator	Crooked I	July 30, 2013	#33 on US Top R&B/Hip-Hop Albums
2013	ERE110	3ChordFold	Terrace Martin	Aug 13, 2013	#43 on US Top R&B/Hip-Hop Albums #9 on US Top Heatseekers Albums
2013	ERE	Travis Garland	Travis Garland	Sep 10, 2013	
2013	ERE	Gas Pedal EP	Sage The Gemini	Sep 10, 2013	
2013	ERE	O.K.E. (Deluxe Edition)	The Game	Oct 8, 2013	#89 on the US Billboard 200 #19 on the US Top R&B/Hip Hop Albums
2013	ERE	Knock Madness	Hopsin	Nov 24, 2013	#1 on US Top Heatseekers Albums #7 on US Top R&B/Hip-Hop Albums #6 on US Independent Albums
2014	ERE135	Tortoise and the Crow CD	Grouch, Eligh	Mar 04, 2014	
2014	ERE139	Phantom and the Ghost	Styles P	Apr 29, 2014	#74 on US Billboard 200 #14 on US Top R&B/Hip-Hop Albums #18 on US Independent Albums
2014	ERE	Barrel Brothers	Skyzoo and Torae	May 27, 2014	
2014	ERE141	Venice	Anderson .Paak	Oct 28, 2014	
2015	ERE	Strictly Roots	Morgan Heritage	June 8, 2015	Grammy Award Winning : Best Reggae Album
2015	ERE141	Fuk Wat They Talkin Bout	Tyga	Aug 24, 2015	
2015	ERE141	Shadow of a Doubt	Freddie Gibbs	Nov 20, 2015	#76 on US Billboard 200
2016	ERE141	Malibu	Anderson .Paak	Jan 15, 2016	#79 on US Billboard 200
2016	ERE141	King of Memphis	Young Dolph	Feb 19, 2016	#49 on US Billboard 200
2017	ERE310	Plata O Plomo	Fat Joe and Remy Ma	Feb 17, 2017	#44 on US Billboard 200
2017	ERE344	Neva Left	Snoop Dogg	May 19, 2017	#54 on US Billboard 200
2017	ERE	For Your Girl Too	Selfish	May 23, 2017	
2017	ERE	BitchImTheShit2	Tyga	Jul 21, 2017	
2017	ERE	17	XXXTentacion	Aug 25, 2017	#2 on US Billboard 200
2018	ERE381	Kyoto	Tyga	Feb 16, 2018	
2018	ERE453	Tru LP	Lloyd	Aug 31, 2018	
2018	ERE	Dancing Shadows	Mario	Oct 5, 2018	
2018	ERE	Skins	XXXTentacion	Dec 7, 2018	#1 on US Billboard 200
2019	ERE	Walk with Me	Rotimi	May 24, 2019	
2019	ERE	Legendary	Tyga	Jun 7, 2019	#17 on US Billboard 200
2019	ERE	In My Defense	Iggy Azalea	Jul 19, 2019	#50 on US Billboard 200
2019	ERE524	I Wanna Thank Me	Snoop Dogg	Aug 16, 2019	#76 on US Billboard 200
2019	ERE	Wicked Lips	Iggy Azalea	Dec 2, 2019	
2019	ERE537	Bad Vibes Forever	XXXTentacion	Dec 6, 2019	#5 on US Billboard 200

=== Notable singles ===
- 2011
  - Kendrick Lamar – "A.D.H.D"
- 2012
  - Hopsin – "Ill Mind of Hopsin 5"
  - Trinidad James – "All Gold Everything"
- 2013
  - Problem – "Like Whaaat"
  - Rocko – "U.O.E.N.O."
  - Sage The Gemini – "Red Nose"
  - T.I. – "Memories Back Then"
- 2014
  - Busta Rhymes – "Calm Down" ft. Eminem
  - Rich Homie Quan – "Walk Thru"
  - Sage The Gemini – "Gas Pedal"
- 2015
  - D.R.A.M. – "Cha Cha"
  - Jermaine Dupri – "WYA" ft. Bow Wow
  - Kane Brown – "Used to Love You Sober"
  - Nef the Pharaoh – "Big Tymin’"
  - Puff Daddy – "Finna Get Loose" ft. Pharrell
  - Popcaan – "Never Sober"
  - Rich Homie Quan – "Flex (Ooh, Ooh, Ooh)"
  - Tyga – "Stimulated"
- 2016
  - Fat Joe & Remy Ma – "All The Way Up" ft. French Montana & Jay-Z (Remix)
  - Lloyd – "Tru"
  - Luke Nasty – "OTW"
- 2018
  - Mario – "Drowning"
  - Tyga - "Taste" ft. Offset
  - Dinah Jane - "Bottled Up" ft. Ty Dolla Sign and Marc E. Bassy
- 2019
  - Adam Lambert - "Feel Something"
  - Iggy Azalea - "Sally Walker"
  - Adam Lambert - "New Eyes"
  - Free Nationals - "Beauty & Essex" ft. Daniel Caesar & Unknown Mortal Orchestra
- 2020
  - King Von - "Took Her to the O"
  - Young Dolph - "RNB" ft. Megan Thee Stallion
  - Busta Rhymes - "YUUUU" with Anderson .Paak
  - T.I. - "Pardon" ft. Lil Baby
  - French Montana - "Double G" ft. Pop Smoke
  - King Von - "The Code" ft. Polo G
  - Rich The Kid & YoungBoy Never Broke Again - "Bankroll"
  - Yung Bleu - "You're Mines Still" ft. Drake
  - Shapiro - "Fast Pace"
  - Shapiro - "Red Handed"
- 2021
  - 50 Cent - "Part of the Game" ft. NLE Choppa and Rileyy Lanez
  - French Montana - "Hot Boy Bling" ft. Jack Harlow and Lil Durk
  - Fat Joe - "Sunshine" (The Light) with DJ Amorphous
  - Busta Rhymes - "Czar" ft. M.O.P. and CJ
  - Yung Bleu - "Ghetto Love Birds" with A Boogie Wit da Hoodie
  - Shapiro - "Never Change"
  - Shelley FKA DRAM - "All Pride Aside" with Summer Walker
  - T-Pain - "I Like Dat" with Kehlani
  - OG Parker, Chris Brown - Rain Down ft. Latto and Layton Greene
  - Yung Bleu - "Baddest" with Chris Brown and 2 Chainz
  - Tyga - "Mrs. Bubblegum"
  - Sean Kingston - "Love Is Wonderful" ft. Travis Barker
- 2023
  - Majeeed and Tiwa Savage - "Gbese"
- 2024
  - G-Dragon - "Power"
- 2025
  - Jisoo - "Earthquake"

== See also ==
- 2014 in hip-hop
- List of record labels
