= I Promise I Will Never Stop Going In =

Mixtape by Rich Homie Quan
- Released: November 26, 2013
- Genre: Hip hop
- Length: 47:23
- Label: T.I.G. Entertainment
- Producer: Metro Boomin; Izze The Producer; 808 Mafia; DJ Spinz; L-Don; The Yardeez; London on da Track; Trail Harper; Villo; Problem; FKi; Trauma Tone, Dupri of League of Starz; Beat Junkies; JPadron

Rich Homie Quan chronology
Still Goin In: Reloaded (2013)	I Promise I Will; Never Stop Going In (2013)	Rich Gang: Tha Tour Pt. 1 (2014)

Singles from I Promise I Will Never Stop Going In
- 1. "Walk Thru" Released: February 4, 2014; 2. "Blah Blah Blah" Released: September 30, 2014

I Promise I Will Never Stop Going In is a mixtape by American rapper Rich Homie Quan; released on November 26, 2013, by T.I.G. Entertainment.

== Singles ==
"Walk Thru" was released on February 4, 2014, as the first single. The song features guest vocals from fellow rapper Problem, who also produced this track, alongside Dupri.

"Blah Blah Blah" was released on September 30, 2014, as the second single. It was produced by Izze The Producer.

== Track listing ==
- All songs written by Dequantes Lamar

No.	Title	Producer(s)	Length
1.	"They Don't Know"	London on da Track	2:58
2.	"Cash Money" (featuring Birdman)	Metro Boomin, 808 Mafia	5:30
3.	"Get TF Out My Face" (featuring Young Thug)	FKi	4:24
4.	"Man of the Year"	Trauma Tone	3:48
5.	"I Fuck Wit You Girl"	Izze The Producer	3:42
6.	"WWYD"	The Yardeez	3:18
7.	"1000"	Trauma Tone	3:23
8.	"Blah Blah Blah"	Izze The Producer	3:06
9.	"Walk Thru" (featuring Problem)	Dupri, Problem (co.)	2:37
10.	"Reloaded"	L-Don	3:01
11.	"Make That Money"	JPadron, Villo	3:37
12.	"Come and Go"	Beat Junkies	3:42
13.	"Real"	DJ Spinz, Metro Boomin	2:52
14.	"Off You"	Trail Harper	3:34
15.	"Hold On"	The Yardeez	4:05
Total length:			47:23

I Promise I Will Never Stop Going In — (bonus tracks)
No.	Title	Producer(s)	Length
16.	"Party"	Beatmonsta
17.	"Whole Lotta"	K.E. on the Track

== Charts ==
2013 chart performance for I Promise I Will Never Stop Going In
Chart (2013)	Peak position
US Top R&B/Hip-Hop Albums (Billboard)	42

2024 chart performance for I Promise I Will Never Stop Going In
Chart (2024)	Peak position
US Billboard 200	110
