= List of northern California rappers =

This is a list of rappers originating from Northern California.

== # ==
- 11/5
- 24kgoldn
- 3X Krazy
- 415
- 22nd Jim

== A ==
- A-1
- A-Plus
- Andre Nickatina
- Ant Banks
- Askari X
- ALLBLACK

== B ==
- Bris
- Baby Bash
- Bavgate (of *Steady Mobb'n)
- B-Legit
- Berner
- Brotha Lynch Hung
- Bishop Lamont
- Big Lurch

== C ==
- C-Bo
- Casual
- Celly Cel
- Chaibenjii4
- The Click
- Clyde Carson
- The Conscious Daughters
- Cougnut
- Cellski

== D ==
- The Dangerous Crew
- DarkRoom Familia
- DB.Boutabag
- Death Grips
- The Delinquents
- Del the Funky Homosapien
- Digital Underground
- DJ Shadow
- Don Cisco
- Droop-E
- D-Shot
- Dru Down

== E ==
- E-40
- E-A-Ski
- EBK Jaaybo

== F ==
- The Federation
- Funk Mobb
- First Degree The DE
- FredoBagz45

== G ==
- G-Eazy
- G-Stack (aka Purple Mane)
- The Grouch

== H ==
- Hieroglyphics

== J ==
- J-Diggs
- The Jacka
- Jay Tee
- J Stalin
- JT the Bigga Figga

== K ==
- Kamaiyah
- Keak da Sneak
- Kung Fu Vampire
- King Louie
- Kriminal
- Kyle

== L ==
- LAN Party
- Lil B
- Luniz
- Luni Coleone
- Lil Coner
- Lil Kayla
- Larry June
- Lil Pete
- LaRussell
- Lil Yee
- Lil Bean

== M ==
- Mad Tv
- Mac Dre
- Mac Mall
- Makaveli
- Marcel Greenwood
- Marvaless
- MC FatViva
- MC Hammer
- MC Ride
- Messy Marv
- Mistah F.A.B.
- Mob Figaz
- MoneyBagzBuzz
- Mozzy
- Mike Sherm

== N ==
- N2Deep
- Nef the Pharaoh
- Nump
- Numskull

== O ==
- OMB Peezy
- Opio

== P ==
- Paris
- Pep Love
- Phesto
- Philthy Rich
- Pighairlol
- Princess Jasmine
- PTM Hud
- P-LO

== R ==
- Rappin' 4-Tay
- Rappin' Ron
- RBL Posse
- Richie Rich
- Rick Rock
- Rydah J. Klyde
- Rexx Life Raj

== S ==
- Sage the Gemini
- San Quinn
- Saweetie
- Seagram
- Sean T
- Shock G
- Souls of Mischief
- Spice 1
- SOB X RBE
- Stunna Girl
- seiji oda

== T ==
- Tajai
- The Team
- Too Short
- Tupac Shakur
- Totally Insane
- Traxamillion
- Turf Talk
- Tha Truth
- Tony B
- Trunk Boiz

== W ==
- Watsky

== X ==
- X-Raided

== Y ==
- Yukmouth
- Young Dru
- Young Slo-Be

== Z ==
- Zendaya
- Zion I
- ZayBang
