= Come Walk with Me =

Come Walk with Me may refer to:

- Come Walk with Me (album), 1997 album by Oleta Adams
- "Come Walk with Me" (song), a 2013 song by M.I.A.
- "(Do You Wanna) Come Walk with Me?", a song by Isobel Cambell from the album Ballad of the Broken Seas
- Come Walk With Me: A Memoir, autobiography by Métis author Beatrice Mosionier

== See also ==
- Walk with Me (disambiguation)
