= Selfish (disambiguation) =

Selfishness refers to taking interest in oneself.

Selfish may also refer to:

== Music ==
- Selfish (rapper), American rapper
- Self-ish, a 2016 album by Will Wood and the Tapeworms
- "Selfish" (Britney Spears song), 2011
- "Selfish" (Future song), 2017
- "Selfish" (Justin Timberlake song), 2024
- "Selfish" (Madison Beer song), 2020
- "Selfish" (PnB Rock song), 2016
- "Selfish" (Slum Village song), 2004
- "Selfish", by Asia Cruise from Who is Asia Cruise?, 2008
- "Selfish", by Dope from Blood Money Part 1, 2016
- "Selfish", by Jessica Mauboy from Hilda, 2019
- "Selfish", by Kanye West from Donda 2, 2022
- "Selfish", by The Kid Laroi from F*ck Love, 2020
- "Selfish", by Koda Kumi from Secret, 2005
- "Selfish", by Kris Wu from Antares, 2018
- "Selfish", by Mamamoo from Red Moon, 2018
- "Selfish", by Medina from Welcome to Medina, 2010
- "Selfish", by Nick Jonas featuring the Jonas Brothers from Spaceman (Digital Deluxe Edition), 2021
- "Selfish", by NSYNC from Celebrity, 2001
- "Selfish", by The Other Two from The Other Two & You, 1993
- "Selfish", by Slowthai from Ugly, 2023
- "Selfish", by Twenty88 from Twenty88, 2016
- "Selfish", by Two Hours Traffic from Two Hours Traffic, 2005
- "Selfish", by Virginia to Vegas from Hartland St., 2017
- "(She's So) Selfish", by The Knack from Get the Knack, 1979

== Other uses ==
- "Selfish" (House), a 2010 episode of the TV series House
- Selfish (book), a 2015 photobook by Kim Kardashian

== See also ==
- Shellfish
