= Achievement =

Achievement or achieving may refer to:

- Achievement (heraldry)
- Achievement (horse), a racehorse
- Achievement (video games), a meta-goal defined outside of a game's parameters, a digital reward that signifies a player's mastery of a specific task or challenge within a video game
- "Achieving", a song from the 2018 album Rich as in Spirit by Rich Homie Quan

== See also ==
- Achievement test for student assessment
- Achiever, a personality type in the pseudoscientific Enneagram of Personality model
- Need for achievement
