= Yung Carter =

American record producer (born 1992)

- Born: Lionel Carter Jr. July 8, 1992 (age 33); Anderson, South Carolina, United States
- Genres: Hip hop
- Occupation: Record Producer
- Instruments: FL Studio, Akai MPK Mini
- Years active: 2006−present
- Labels: Artist Publishing Group, Warner Chappell

Lionel Carter Jr. (born July 8, 1992, Anderson, South Carolina), also known under the stage name Yung Carter, is an American record producer. He produced the single "Type Of Way" by Rich Homie Quan, and worked with artists such as French Montana, Kevin Gates, and Big K.R.I.T.

== Early life and career ==
In his early years, Carter developed an interest in rhythm and blues as well as classic rap music. Following his graduation from Westside High School, he redirected his focus toward music by enrolling at The Art Institute. During this time, he shared living quarters with a roommate who created beats. Initially, Carter aspired to become an engineer and record artists; however, after observing his roommate's creative process, he became inspired to pursue music production.

In 2011, Carter decided to discontinue his college education and embarked on a career in engineering and recording for various artists. However, he found himself dissatisfied with the direction of his professional path. Lacking alternative employment, he commenced selling his musical beats to support himself financially. Motivated by his cousin, Yung Jonez, Carter dedicated himself to enhancing the quality of his beats. Over time, their collaborative efforts yielded a strong musical synergy, leading Carter to produce several tracks for Yung Jonez..

== Production discography ==
=== 2011 ===
- Yung Jonez

"Down South Nigga" (featuring Fleetwood)
"Sideline" (featuring Stetson)

- Old Child - Gwalla Muzik

"Fastline" (featuring Tracy T)

- Jas B - Carter's Basement

"Kissing You" (featuring Tida)

=== 2013 ===
- Rich Homie Quan - Still Goin In: Reloaded

"Investments"
"All I Need"
"Type of Way"

- Jas B

"Jealously" (featuring Ice Cxld)

- Yung Gutta

"Wake Up, Count Up" (featuring Fabo)

=== 2014 ===
- Domani Harris

"Roll With Me" (produced with Go Grizzly)

- Kevin Gates - By Any Means

"Get Up on My Level"

- Young Dro - Black Label

"Watch Out" (featuring Mac Boney)
"Grits" (featuring BG Marco) (produced with Go Grizzly)

- Jas B

"What You Know" (featuring Yung Jonez)

- J.R. Donato - North Pole

"Bundlez" (featuring Wiz Khalifa) (produced with Fr4ncis)

=== 2015 ===
- Rich Homie Quan - If You Ever Think I Will Stop Goin' in Ask RR (Royal Rich)

"Eye"

- Yung Ralph - "Money To Blow"
