= Understand Me =

EP by Problem
- Released: December 10, 2013
- Genre: Hip hop
- Length: 23:17
- Label: Diamond Lane Music Group
- Producer: Iamsu!; League of Starz; Mars; P-Lo of The Invasion; TONEBONEBEATS; Yung JR

Problem chronology
Understand Me (2013)	Rosecrans (2017)

Singles from Understand Me
- 1. "Like Whaaat" Released: February 12, 2013; 2. "Say That Then" Released: July 23, 2013

Understand Me is the debut EP by American hip hop recording artist Problem, released on December 10, 2013 under Diamond Lane Music Group. The EP follows up six months after the release of his ninth mixtape, The Separation. The eight-track project is a collection of new and previously released material, including "Like Whaaat," "Say That Then" and the title track. The EP features production from League of Starz, Mars (of production group 1500 or Nothin'), P-Lo of The Invasion, Yung JR and Iamsu!. Guest appearances on the EP came from Glasses Malone, Bad Lucc (of Dubb Union) and Mars.

For promotional purposes, Diamond Lane Music Group published a trailer on YouTube on November 21, 2013. On December 6, 2013, Problem finalized a Californian tour in support of his The Separation mixtape and the EP. On that same date, Understand Me, was made available to stream via the West Coast rapper's MySpace page. On December 8, 2013, the title track's Taj TPK and Austin Kelley-directed visual was published on YouTube.

== Track listing ==
No.	Title	Writer(s)	Producer(s)	Length
1.	"Moment of Clarity"	J. Martin	Yung JR	2:12
2.	"Understand Me"	J. Martin	P-Lo of The Invasion	3:08
3.	"Say That Then" (featuring Glasses Malone)	J. Martin; C. Penniman	TONEBONEBEATS	2:52
4.	"Let 'Em Die"	J. Martin	Iamsu!	2:21
5.	"Be On"	J. Martin	League of Starz	2:54
6.	"Stop Playin'" (featuring Mars)	J. Martin; L. Edwards	Mars	2:56
7.	"Like Whaaat" (featuring Bad Lucc)	J. Martin; T. Harden	League of Starz	3:31
8.	"Singin' From My Heart"	J. Martin	League of Starz	3:23
Total length:				23:17

== Chart positions ==
Chart (2013)	Peak position
US Billboard Heatseekers Albums	8
US Billboard Top R&B/Hip-Hop Albums	44
