= Sharp On All 4 Corners: Corner 1 =

Studio album by E-40
- Released: December 9, 2014
- Recorded: 2013–2014
- Genre: Hip hop
- Length: 54:47
- Label: Heavy on the Grind
- Producer: B.A.M.; Clinton Sands; Decadez; Kristo; Mike Free; Poly Boy; Rick Rock; Stunna June; Sam Bostic; Tone Bone; Ted DiGTL; Tha Bizness; VT

E-40 chronology
The Block Brochure: Welcome to the Soil 6 (2013)	Sharp On All 4 Corners: Corner 1 (2014)	Sharp On All 4 Corners: Corner 2 (2014)

Singles from Sharp On All 4 Corners: Corner 1
- 1. "Red Cup" Released: August 6, 2014; 2. "Choices (Yup)" Released: October 31, 2014

Sharp On All 4 Corners: Corner 1 is the twenty-first studio album by American rapper E-40. The album was released on December 9, 2014, by Heavy on the Grind Entertainment. The album features guest appearances from Boosie Badazz, T-Pain, Kid Ink, B.o.B, Turf Talk, Cousin Fik, Ezale, Vell, Adrian Marcel, Willie Joe, Nef the Pharaoh, Too Short, B-Legit and Otis & Shug. The album was supported by the singles "Red Cup" and "Choices (Yup)".

Sharp On All 4 Corners: Corner 2 was also released on the same day.

== Singles ==
On August 6, 2014, the album's first single "Red Cup" featuring T-Pain, Kid Ink and B.o.B was released. On October 9, 2014, the music video was released for "Red Cup" featuring T-Pain, Kid Ink and B.o.B. On October 31, 2014, the album's second single "Choices (Yup)" was released. On April 29, 2015, E-40 released a Golden State Warriors version of "Choices (Yup)"

== Commercial performance ==
The album debuted at number 61 on the Billboard 200 chart, with first-week sales of 11,770 copies in the United States.

== Track listing ==
No.	Title	Producer(s)	Length
1.	"Programmin"	Sam Bostic	3:04
2.	"Can't Fuck With Me"	@ToneBonebeats	3:13
3.	"Money Sack" (featuring Boosie Badazz)	Mike Free; B.A.M.	3:23
4.	"Red Cup" (featuring T-Pain, Kid Ink & B.o.B)	Kristo	4:11
5.	"Knockin' At the Light"	Rick Rock	3:14
6.	"Choices (Yup)"	Poly Boy	4:32
7.	"Three Jobs"	Mike Free	3:31
8.	"Paint the Picture" (featuring Turf Talk & Cousin Fik)	Decadez	3:45
9.	"Straight Mobbin'" (featuring Ezale & Vell)	Stunna June	3:16
10.	"2 Fingers" (featuring Adrian Marcel)	Tha Bizness	5:10
11.	"Playa" (featuring VT)	VT	3:51
12.	"707" (featuring Willie Joe & Nef the Pharaoh)	Decadez	4:36
13.	"Same Since '88" (featuring Too Short & B-Legit)	Ted DiGTL	3:59
14.	"Family" (featuring Otis & Shug)	Clinton Sands	5:02

== Charts ==
Chart (2014)	Peak position
US Billboard 200	61
US Top R&B/Hip-Hop Albums (Billboard)	8
US Top Rap Albums (Billboard)	4
US Independent Albums (Billboard)	7
