= Choices (Yup) =

2014 song by E-40

Single by E-40

from the album Sharp On All 4 Corners: Corner 1
- Released: October 31, 2014
- Genre: West Coast hip hop
- Length: 4:32
- Label: Heavy on the Grind Entertainment
- Songwriter: Earl Stevens
- Producer: Poly Boy

E-40 singles chronology
"I Don't Fuck with You" (2014)	"Choices (Yup)" (2014)	"Saved" (2015)

Music video
- "Choices" on YouTube

"Choices (Yup)" (also titled simply as "Choices") is a song by American rapper E-40. It is the second single from his 21st studio album Sharp On All 4 Corners: Corner 1 (2014).

== Content ==
In the hook, E-40 highlights the idea that everyone has to make choices in life, while stressing his focus on making money; this is a common theme in hip hop tied to ambition and economic mobility. In the verses, he employs a question-and-answer format, running through different scenarios and answering them with a decisive “yup” or “nope.” This approach reflects hip hop’s emphasis on self-definition and authenticity, as E-40 lays out his values and draws clear lines about what he stands for.

== Remixes ==
E-40 released a remix of the song on April 29, 2015, which has different lyrics that are in honor of Golden State Warriors. In 2016, the song was parodied in a new commercial by DriveTime, a used car dealership network.

== Charts ==
Chart (2015)	Peak position
US Bubbling Under Hot 100 (Billboard)	24
US Hot R&B/Hip-Hop Songs (Billboard)	43

== Certifications ==
Region	Certification	Certified units/sales
United States (RIAA)	2× Platinum	2,000,000^{‡}
^{‡} Sales+streaming figures based on certification alone.
