= If You Ever Think I Will Stop Goin' In Ask Double R =

If You Ever Think I Will Stop Goin' in Ask RR (Royal Rich)

Mixtape by Rich Homie Quan
- Released: April 28, 2015
- Recorded: 2015
- Genre: Hip hop
- Length: 64:03
- Label: T.I.G. Entertainment
- Producer: DJ Fresh (exec.); K.E. on the Track; London on da Track; Izze The Producer; DJ Spinz; The Mekanics; Trauma Tone; Only 1 Scoota; DT Spacely; Cameron Cartee; Nitti Beatz; Jescarp; Yung Ian; Yung Carter; The Yardeez; Goose; Wheezy

Rich Homie Quan chronology
Rich Gang: Tha Tour Pt. 1 (2014)	If You Ever Think I Will Stop Goin' in Ask RR (Royal Rich) (2015)	Back to the Basics (2017)

Singles from If You Ever Think I Will Stop Goin' in Ask RR (Royal Rich)
- 1. "Daddy" Released: January 17, 2015; 2. "Flex (Ooh, Ooh, Ooh)" Released: February 10, 2015

Back Cover

If You Ever Think I Will Stop Goin' in Ask RR (Royal Rich) is the fifth mixtape by American rapper Rich Homie Quan. It was released on April 28, 2015, by T.I.G. Entertainment exclusively on MyMixtapez. The mixtapes features no guest appearances, and production was handled by K.E. on the Track, London on da Track, The Mekanics, Izze The Producer, DJ Spinz, Trauma Tone, Only 1 Scoota, DT Spacely, Nitti Beatz, Jescarp, Yung Lan, Yung Carter, The Yardeez, Goose and Wheezy.

== Background ==
In September 2014, Rich Gang released their collaborative mixtape, Rich Gang: Tha Tour Pt. 1. The mixtape received generally favourable reviews and has been viewed over five million times on LiveMixtapes, but the follow-up was delayed, due to them returning to their solo projects with a return a possibility in the future. While having to spend some time returning his attention to his career, Rich Homie Quan is hoping to bring a new sound using a variety of voice techniques and lyricism to bring his music to a wider audience. The mixtape was named, after his son Royal Rich.

== Track listing ==
No.	Title	Writer(s)	Producer(s)	Length
1.	"Intro"	Dequantes Lamar	Only 1 Scoota	3:42
2.	"15 Shots"	D. Lamar	DT Spacely	2:34
3.	"Ran Off"	D. Lamar	DT Spacely	3:24
4.	"Throw It Back"	D. Lamar	Izze The Producer	2:55
5.	"I Get"	D. Lamar	DT Spacely	4:13
6.	"Flex (Ooh, Ooh, Ooh)"	D. Lamar	DJ Spinz; Nitti Beatz (co.)	2:52
7.	"Stupid Me"	D. Lamar	Jescarp	2:46
8.	"Take My Hand"	D. Lamar	Izze The Producer	4:11
9.	"Beside Yourself"	D. Lamar	Trauma Tone	2:23
10.	"Worried Bout' Shit"	D. Lamar	Izze The Producer	2:16
11.	"Rappin' "	D. Lamar	Only 1 Scoota	3:11
12.	"I Swear"	D. Lamar	Only 1 Scoota	2:36
13.	"Now I Know"	D. Lamar	Yung Lan	4:46
14.	"Doing It"	D. Lamar	The Yardeez	2:04
15.	"Sorry"	D. Lamar	DT Spacely	2:51
16.	"Eye"	D. Lamar	Yung Carter	3:40
17.	"Forever Millions"	D. Lamar	DJ Spinz; London on da Track (add.)	2:50
18.	"I Been"	D. Lamar	Goose	4:08
Total length:				57:22

If You Ever Think I Will Stop Goin' In Ask RR (Royal Rich) — (bonus tracks)
No.	Title	Writer(s)	Producer(s)	Length
19.	"Set It Off"	Dequantes Lamar	Wheezy	2:39
20.	"Daddy"	Lamar	K.E. on the Track; The Mekanics	4:02
Total length:				64:03
