= ALLBLACK =

American rapper

- Born: D'Andre Sams; March 21, 1992 (age 34); Oakland, California, U.S.
- Genres: Hip hop
- Occupation: Rapper
- Years active: 2015–present
- Labels: Play Runners Association, Empire

D'Andre Sams (born March 21, 1992), known professionally as ALLBLACK, is an American rapper. Known for his straightforward flow and gritty lyrics about pimping and street life, Sams emerged as a prominent figure in the Bay Area hip-hop scene in the late 2010s.

== Early life ==
Sams was born and raised in the San Antonio neighborhood of East Oakland, near International Boulevard, an area commonly known as the "Murder Dubs" due to the rise of drug-related violence in the 1990s. Sams attended Pinole Valley High School, where he was a standout football player. After high school, he spent time in Santa Barbara and Atlanta from 2011 to 2015, which later influenced his musical perspective and outlook.

== Career ==
=== 2015–2017: Career beginnings ===
Sams' entry into music was unplanned. He initially served as a hype man for Berkeley rapper Kossisko at The Roxy Theatre in January 2013. Encouraged by his mother to write as a way to deal with anger, Sams began writing raps in his early 20s. His debut project, No Shame, was released in 2015, followed by No Shame 2 in 2016, hosted by prominent Atlanta DJ Trap-a-Holics, known for distributing mixtapes by Gucci Mane and Lil Boosie. The latter marked a turning point in his career, showcasing his unique flow that blended Bay Area influences with a Detroit-style cadence. In 2017, Sams released the "KimSon" EP, which catapulted him to regional stardom in the Bay Area.

=== 2018–present: Rising prominence ===
Sams' 2018 project Outcalls offered a gritty and humanizing view of pimping and prostitution in the Bay Area. The project featured guest appearances from notable West Coast artists like Nef the Pharaoh, Guapdad 4000, P-Lo, and 03 Greedo, and was produced by Japanese-American producer David Teel. The same year, he collaborated with producer Kenny Beats on the EP 2 Minute Drills, which consisted of eight tracks heavily featuring football analogies.

In October 2020, Sams released the EP No Shame 3, featuring collaborations with Too Short, DaBoii of SOB X RBE. He performed on Jimmy Kimmel Live! alongside Offset Jim, Blueface, and G-Eazy.

May 2021 saw the release of TY4FWM (Thank You for Fucking With Me), Sams' debut album featuring production from DJ Fresh and collaborations with artists such as Vince Staples, Drakeo the Ruler, and E-40.

== Musical style and themes ==
Sams' lyrics openly discuss his past involvement in pimping, which he started as a teenager. Sams describes his music as his "diary" and often draws from his pimping experiences as material in his lyrics, while expressing conflicted feelings about this period of his life.

Sams' music is characterized by vivid storytelling, unique slang, extensive football metaphors, and aggressive delivery. Music critics have compared his writing style to Tupac Shakur and DMX. His lyrics often deal with themes of trauma, hustling, fatherhood, and his experiences growing up in Oakland, including references to the city's culture of sideshows, parties, and sex work. Sams cites Cash Money Records artists like Lil Wayne and Juvenile as major influences, along with E-40, 3XKrazy, and classic funk, soul, and R&B music. In his personal philosophy, Sams emphasizes principles such as honesty, loyalty, communication, and respect.

== Personal life ==
Sams' brother and multiple cousins played in the NFL, but Sams himself drifted away from football after the death of several close friends in 2010. Sams' grandfather was a member of the Black Panther Party in the 1960s. Sams has close ties to Golden State Warriors players, particularly Klay Thompson, who is a fan of his music.

== Discography ==
=== Albums ===
- TY4FWM (2021)
- Born to Score (2023)
- Slow Motion Better Than No Motion (2024)
- ROUND 1 (2024)

=== EPs ===
- No Shame (2015)
- No Shame 2 (2016)
- KimSon (2017)
- Outcalls (2018)
- 2 Minute Drills (with Kenny Beats) (2018)
- 22nd Ways (with Offset Jim) (2019)
- No Shame 3 (2020)
