= Lady iLe =

American rapper

Lady ILE
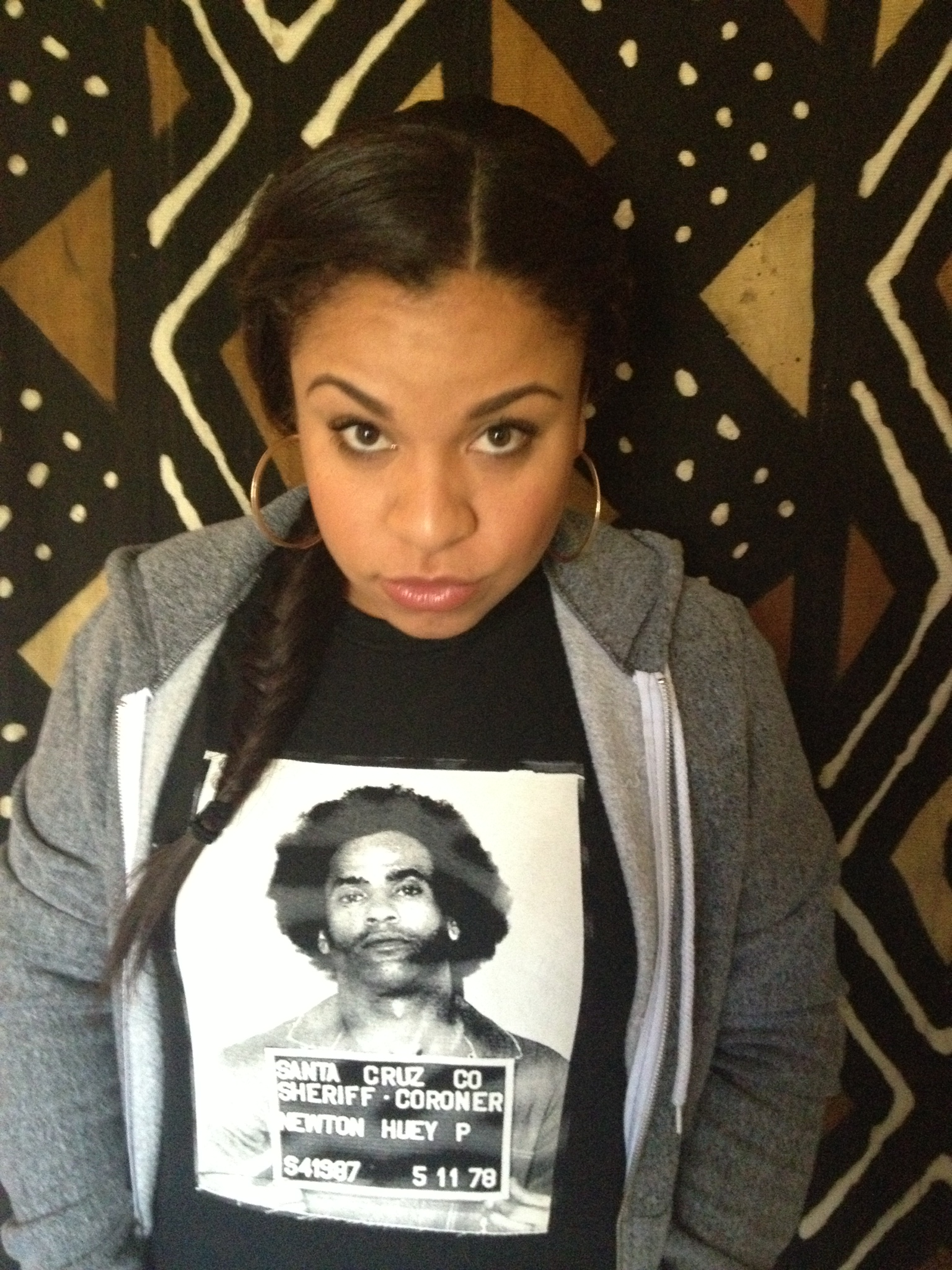

Background information
- Also known as: Lady Ile
- Born: August 19, 1984 (age 41); Santa Cruz, California
- Genres: Rap, hip hop
- Occupations: Rapper, lyricist, singer, emcee, esthetician
- Years active: 2006–present
- Labels: Supply & Demand, Black Business, The Tonite Show Recordings
- Website: Lady ILE on Facebook

Lady ILE (Santa Cruz, California), is an American rapper and emcee based in Los Angeles. She released her debut EP 1st Impression in 2011, and in 2014 released "Still Turnt Up," a collaborative single with DJ Fresh. She has also collaborated as a primary artist, composer, or vocalist with artists such as Droop E, Cousin Fik, Prince Lefty, J Stalin, King Bam Bubbi, Sleyv, Stevie Joe, Planet Asia, & The Jacka. Power 106 has her songs "So Wrong" and "Awesome" in their rotation, and according to the station, "Her versatile, eclectic style has variety from soulful hip hop to mob music to what you want to hear in a club."

== Early life ==
Lady ILE was born on August 19, 1984, in Santa Cruz, California, where she was raised. At the age of six she started writing music and poetry, and she has been rapping and emceeing since 2007.

== Music career ==
=== Early releases ===
Amongst Lady ILE's earliest releases was a 2006 mixtape. Her debut album, a digital EP titled 1st Impression, was produced by DJ Fresh. A single from the album, "So Wrong," was released as early as October 2011. The album itself was released on February 7, 2012 on World Records, with the five tracks including "Introducing Lady Ile," "Wtf," "So Wrong," "Interlude," and Awesome." The Los Angeles hip hop station Power 106 put her songs "So Wrong" and "Awesome" in their rotation, and according to Power 106, "Her versatile, eclectic style has variety from soulful hip hop to mob music to what you want to hear in a club."

On February 25, 2014, her collaborative single with DJ Fresh was released on the Fresh in Fresh Entertainment label. Titled "Still Turnt Up," an earlier music video for the track premiered on VEVO on January 30, 2014. The music video was filmed and edited by PJ Flores of 4 Dub Entertainment.

=== Recent years ===
Lady ILE has appeared on a number of releases by other artists. In 2008 she was featured on "Lights on Me" by Sleyv, and in 2009 she was featured on the track "Hypnotizing" by Prince Lefty. "Hypnotizing" was included on the album Planet Guap and produced by Keem Beats.

She frequently collaborates with producer DJ Fresh and periodically appears on his Tonite Show album series. In 2012 she was a featured artist on the track "I Wanna F*ck" off Cousin Fik & Dj.Fresh - The Tonite Show. That year she was also a composer and featured artist for the track "Ride For You," included on The Jacka & Dj.Fresh - The Tonite Show by The Jacka and DJ Fresh. The track featured Stevie Joe, with Lady ILE handling the choral elements.

In 2013, she was a primary artist on "Relax" off The Tonite Show Sessions Vol. 2, and in February 2014 she was featured on the track "Still Turnt Up" on DJ Fresh's album Boomin' System, a mixtape which also featured artists such as Kendrick Lamar, Droop-E, and J. Stalin. The mixtape was received positively, and a review by Complex praised the variety and unpredictability of the production styles.

She has announced an upcoming full album titled 1st Impression. Produced by DJ Fresh, it is due to be released in the spring of 2014.

== Personal life ==
Lady ILE has a career as a professional esthetician, and she is currently located in Los Angeles.

== Discography ==
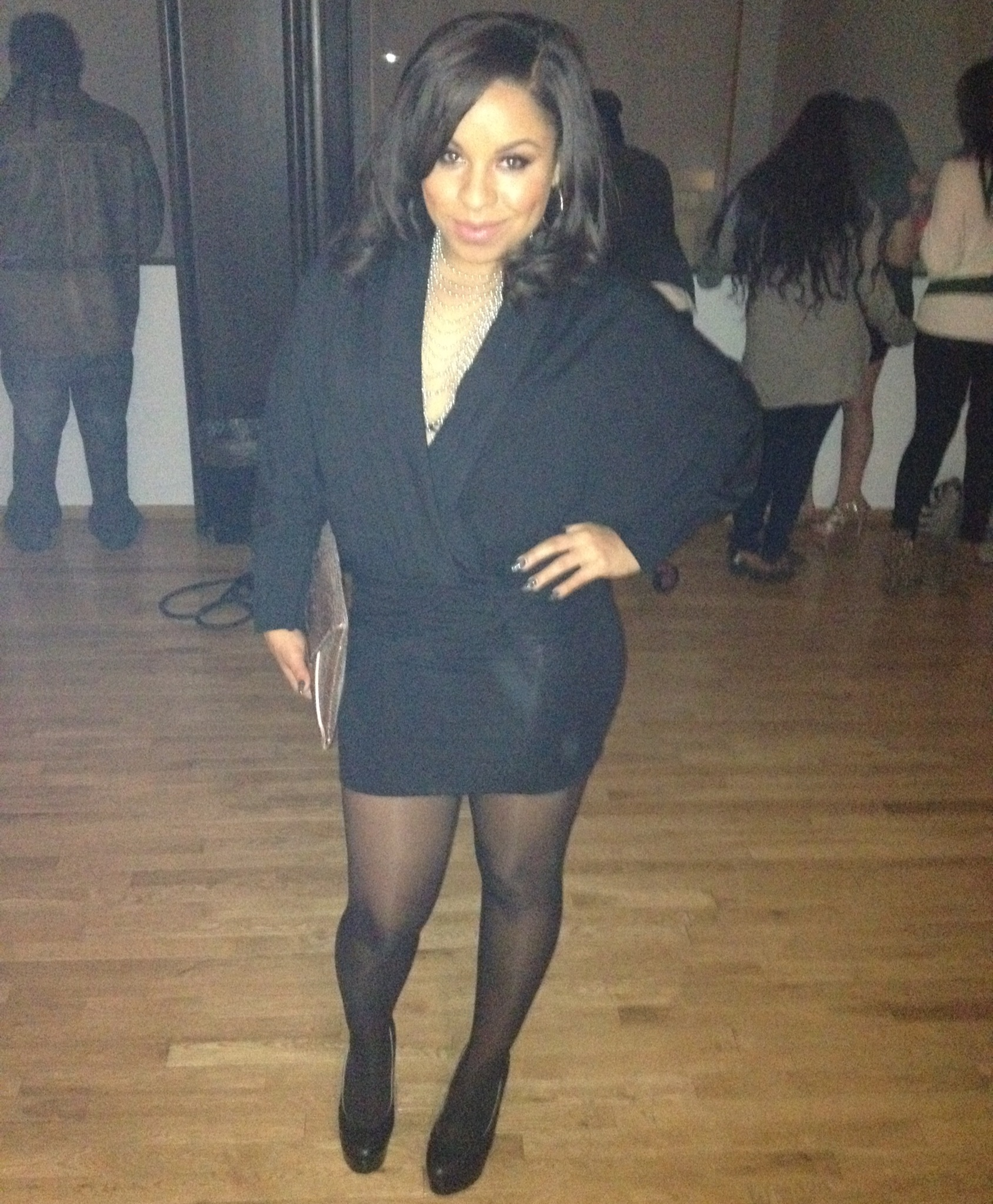
Lady Ile

=== Solo albums ===
List of studio albums by Lady Ile
Year	Album title	Release details
2006	Mixtape	Released: 2006; Label: unknown; Format: Digital
2011	1st Impression EP	Released: Dec 15, 2011; Label: World Records; Format: Digital, Physical
2011	1st Impression EP (Instrumentals)	Released: Dec 22, 2011 Format: Digital
2015	Overdue Feelings	Released: Oct 23, 2015 Format: Physical & Digital

=== Singles ===
List of singles by Lady Ile
Year	Album title	Release details
2014	"Still Turnt Up" by Lady Ile & The Worlds Freshest	Released: Feb 25, 2014; Label: Fresh in the Flesh; Format: Digital, music video
2015	“Ready For The Night” Lady Ile & DJ.Fresh Worlds Freshest	Released: May 19, 2015 Format: Digital

=== Features ===
List of songs with Lady Ile as featured artist
Year	Song title	Primary artist(s)	Album
2008	"Lights On Me" Feat Lady Ile	Sleyv	Death Or Success
2009	"Hypnotizing" Feat Lady Ile	Prince Lefty	Planet Guap
2012	"I Wanna F*ck" Feat Lady Ile	Cousin Fik, DJ Fresh (producer)	The Tonite Show With Cousin Fik
2012	“Boomin’ System” Feat Bo Strangles & Lady Ile	The Jacka & DJ.Fresh	The Tonite Show With The Jacka
2012	"Ride For You" Feat Lady Ile, Stevie Joe	The Jacka, Dj.Fresh	The Tonite Show With The Jacka
2013	"Relax" Feat Lady Ile	Lady Ile, The Worlds Freshest, The Bam Bubbi Project	The Tonite Show Sessions (Volume 2)
2014	“Boomin’ System (Remix)” Feat Lady Ile, Keak Da Sneak, J Stalin, Fashawn	The Jacka & DJ.Fresh	The Tonite Show (The Street Album) (Unreleased)
2014	“Top Shelf” Feat Lady Ile	DJ.Fresh	Boomin’ System
2015	“Back In The Day” Feat Lady Ile	J Stalin & DJ.Fresh	The Real World West Oakland (Part 4)
2015	“What’s This” Feat Lady Ile	Planet Asia & DJ.Fresh	The Tonite Show With Planet Asia
2021	“One Of Dem Nights” Feat Lady Ile	DJ.Fresh & Droop-E	Night At The Roxbury (Unreleased)

== See also ==
- West Coast hip hop
