= Miracle & Nightmare on 10th Street =

Miracle & Nightmare On 10th Street

Studio album by J. Stalin and DJ Fresh
- Released: July 16, 2013
- Genre: Hip hop
- Length: 1:40:59
- Label: Fresh in the Flesh Entertainment; Livewire Records
- Producer: M. Brown; Droop-E; Face tha Music; Lil Retro; Matt Luty; Mike Rimzo; J. Smith; The World's Freshest

J. Stalin and DJ Fresh chronology
| Return of the Body Snatchers (2013) | Miracle & Nightmare On 10th Street (2013) |

Miracle & Nightmare on 10th Street is a double-disc collaboration album between American rapper J. Stalin and producer DJ Fresh (the latter working under the moniker "The World's Freshest"), released on July 16, 2013. Both the Miracle and Nightmare discs were originally released as two separate albums. It peaked at #61 on the R&B/Hip-Hop Albums chart and at #28 on the Heatseekers Albums chart. Miracle & Nightmare on 10th Street is DJ Fresh's first charting album to date and is also one of J. Stalin's most successful to date. It features a guest appearance from Freddie Gibbs. Music videos have been filmed for "Torta" featuring Lil Retro, "Dopegame" featuring L'Jay and "P.O.L.O. (Players Only Live Once)".

== Track listings ==
=== Disc 1: Miracle ===
1. "Everglades" – 3:47
2. "4 O'clock" – 3:21
3. "P.O.L.O. (Players Only Live Once)" – 3:23
4. "Take My Hand" – 4:05
5. "So Many Times" – 2:38
6. "The Weekend" – 2:46
7. "Bring That Money Back" – 2:33
8. "City Nights" (featuring Shady Nate) – 3:41
9. "Pretty Face" – 3:03
10. "Naturally Mine" – 2:51
11. "Just What You Want" (featuring L'Jay) – 2:53
12. "All Around the World" – 3:14
13. "Corner STO, Pt. 2" – 2:39
14. "Look Where I Done Came From" (featuring L'Jay) – 3:43
15. "Bomb" – 3:30

=== Disc 2: Nightmare ===
1. "Nightmare on 10th Street" – 4:34
2. "The Money Blower" – 3:43
3. "Whip It" – 4:12
4. "F**k You, Pt. 2" – 2:52
5. "Colma" – 4:23
6. "The New Me" – 2:56
7. "Sirens" – 3:05
8. "Verses Gone Up" – 3:18
9. "Jimmy the Gent" – 3:10
10. "In the Rain" (featuring Freddie Gibbs) – 4:15
11. "I Can't Believe" – 2:56
12. "Heavy Conscious" – 3:56
13. "Warning" – 3:00
14. "Tim McGraw" – 3:12
15. "Torta" (featuring Lil Retro) – 3:22
