= By Any Means (mixtape) =

Mixtape by Kevin Gates
- Released: March 17, 2014
- Recorded: 2013–14
- Genre: Hip hop; southern hip hop; gangsta rap
- Length: 55:43
- Label: Atlantic; Bread Winners' Association
- Producer: I10DopeBoyz; All Star; Knucklehead; Go Grizzly; Dun Deal; Dave Cappa; V12 The Hittman; Chrishan; Beewirks; Jim Jonsin; Finatik N Zac; Honorable C-Note; The Runners; The Monarch; Big Soj; Kane Beatz; Yung Stylez; Bricks Da Mane; Yung Carter

Kevin Gates chronology
Stranger than Fiction (2013)	By Any Means (2014)	Luca Brasi 2 (2014)

Singles from By Any Means
- 1. "Don't Know" Released: 2014; 2. "Posed To Be In Love" Released: 2014; 3. "Amnesia" Released: 2014

By Any Means is the eleventh commercial mixtape by American rapper Kevin Gates. It was released on March 17, 2014, by his Breadwinners Association label, distributed by Atlantic Records. The mixtape debuted at number 17 on the Billboard 200, selling 17,000 copies in the United States. On DatPiff, this mixtape has been downloaded over 1,038,543 times, as of January 22, 2019. A sequel, titled By Any Means 2, was released in 2017.

== Critical reception ==
Professional ratings
Review scores
Source	Rating
AllMusic	4/5 stars
HipHopDX	3.5/5 stars
Pitchfork	(7.5/10)

By Any Means received positive reviews from music critics. AllMusic's David Jeffries praised Gates for making tweaks to the above-average mixtape, singling out "Movies" and "Posed to Be in Love" as "unexpected excellence buried on a stopgap release, all of them making this mixtape quite necessary for fans of Gates' albums." Christina Lee of HipHopDX praised Gates' storytelling lyricism and beat choices for remaining consistent in finding the middle-ground between underground and mainstream, calling the mixtape "a smart display of his skills that aims for Rap radio airplay but doesn’t sacrifice too much personality, and a reliable stopgap between now and what’s ahead." Renato Pagnani of Pitchfork praised Gates for mixing the different styles from his previous mixtapes to deliver a strong precursor to his full-length debut, concluding that "With By All Means he completes a three-release run that's as solid as any in recent memory, even if the answer to the question of whether he has another gear in him remains unanswered for the time being."

== Commercial performance ==
By Any Means debuted at number 17 on the US Billboard 200, selling 17,000 copies in its first week of release. On September 7, 2018, the mixtape was certified gold by the Recording Industry Association of America (RIAA) for combined sales and album-equivalent units of over 500,000 units in the United States.

== Track listing ==
No.	Title	Producer(s)	Length
1.	"Wish I Had It"	All Star	3:31
2.	"Don't Know"	Knucklehead; Go Grizzly	3:05
3.	"Amnesia" (featuring Doe B)	Dun Deal	3:29
4.	"Can't Make This Up"	Dave Cappa	3:30
5.	"Keep Fucking With Me" (featuring Plies)	V12 The Hittman	2:46
6.	"Homicide"	Chrishan	3:08
7.	"Movie"	Beewirks	3:21
8.	"Go Hard" (featuring Rico Love)	Jim Jonsin; Finatik N Zac	3:40
9.	"Bet I'm on It" (featuring 2 Chainz)	Honorable C-Note	3:30
10.	"Arm & Hammer"	The Runners, The Monarch	3:27
11.	"Posed to Be in Love"	Go Grizzly	2:44
12.	"Stop Lyin'"	Dun Deal	4:22
13.	"Wit It"	Big Soj; Kane Beatz	3:28
14.	"Just Want Some Money"	DJ Yung Stylez	4:05
15.	"Again"	Bricks Da Mane	3:27
16.	"Get Up On My Level!"	Yung Carter	4:16
Total length:			55:43

== Charts ==
=== Weekly charts ===
Chart (2014)	Peak position
US Billboard 200	17
US Top R&B/Hip-Hop Albums (Billboard)	5
US Top Rap Albums (Billboard)	3

=== Year-end charts ===
Chart (2014)	Position
US Top R&B/Hip-Hop Albums (Billboard)	94

== Certifications ==
Region	Certification	Certified units/sales
United States (RIAA)	Gold	500,000^{‡}
^{‡} Sales+streaming figures based on certification alone.
