= Tina Davis (music industry executive) =

American music executive

- Born: San Francisco Bay Area, California, U S.
- Education: Grambling State University
- Occupation: Music industry executive
- Title: President, EMPIRE
- Awards: Billboard Power 100 (2025) Hip Hop/R&B Power Players; Billboard Women in Music; CNN Agent of Change

Tina Davis is an American music industry executive. She is the president of Empire (stylized as EMPIRE), an independent record label, distribution and publishing company.

Raised in Vallejo, California, Davis was the first woman to head the A&R department at Def Jam. In 2008, she founded Phase Too, an artist management firm. Among others, she managed Chris Brown.

Davis joined Empire in 2018 as vice president of A&R. She was promoted to senior vice president of A&R in 2021 and named president of the company in June 2023. She appeared on the Billboard Power 100 in 2024, 2025, and 2026.
