= I Know (Yo Gotti song) =

Single by Yo Gotti featuring Rich Homie Quan

from the album I Am
- Released: November 15, 2013
- Recorded: 2013
- Genre: Hip hop
- Length: 4:19
- Label: CMG, Epic Records
- Songwriter(s): Mario Mims, Denzil Foster, Jay King, Dequantes Lamar, Thomas McElroy
- Producer(s): Trauma Tone

Yo Gotti singles chronology
"Cold Blood" (2013)	"I Know" (2013)	"Numb" (2013)

Rich Homie Quan singles chronology
"My Nigga" (2013)	"I Know" (2013)	"Walk Thru" (2014)

"I Know" is a song by American hip hop recording artist Yo Gotti. The song was released on November 15, 2013, as the fourth single from his fourth studio album, I Am (2013). "I Know" features a guest appearance from rapper Rich Homie Quan who produced the song along with Trauma Tone. The song samples Club Nouveau's "Why You Treat Me So Bad", the same song sampled on Luniz's prolific "I Got 5 On It". Following its release, the song peaked at number 31 on the US Billboard Hot R&B/Hip-Hop Songs chart.

== Background and release ==
On November 6, 2013, the Rich Homie Quan featuring "I Know" was released for free streaming online along with the rest of the album. The song which was produced by Trauma Tone and Rich Homie Quan, features a significant sample use of Club Nouveau's "Why You Treat Me So Bad", the same song sampled on Luniz's prolific "I Got 5 On It". This is replicated in the bass line and string layers.

On November 15, 2013, "I Know" was released for digital download as the album's fourth single. It was serviced to rhythmic contemporary radio in the United States on May 27, 2014.

== Critical reception ==
"I Know" received generally positive reviews from music critics. David Jeffries of AllMusic praised the song and sample usage as "great". Bryan Dupont-Gray of The Daily Cougar stated the production sold the song and it is one of the better tracks on the album. Grant Jones of RapReviews.com said, Gotti's "messy flow and rushed delivery are left all over an admittedly decent take on the inimitable Da Luniz track "I Got Five On It"." Ronald Grant of HipHopDX said, ""I Know" contains production directly inspired by Club Nouveau's old school R&B classic "Why You Treat Me So Bad," but contains a lazy hook by guest star Rich Homie Quan. This ultimately makes the tune listenable yet draggingly boring."

== Music video ==
The music video for "I Know" was released on May 1, 2014.

== Charts ==
=== Weekly charts ===
Chart (2014)	Peak position
US Bubbling Under Hot 100 (Billboard)	1
US Hot R&B/Hip-Hop Songs (Billboard)	31

=== Year-end charts ===
Chart (2014)	Position
US Hot R&B/Hip-Hop Songs (Billboard)	94

== Certifications ==
Region	Certification	Certified units/sales
United States (RIAA)	Platinum	1,000,000^{‡}
^{‡} Sales+streaming figures based on certification alone.

== Release history ==
Country	Date	Format	Label
United States	November 15, 2013	Digital download	Collective Music Group, Epic Records
United States	May 27, 2014	Rhythmic contemporary radio	Collective Music Group, Epic Records
