= Lefty Gunplay =

American rapper (born 1996)

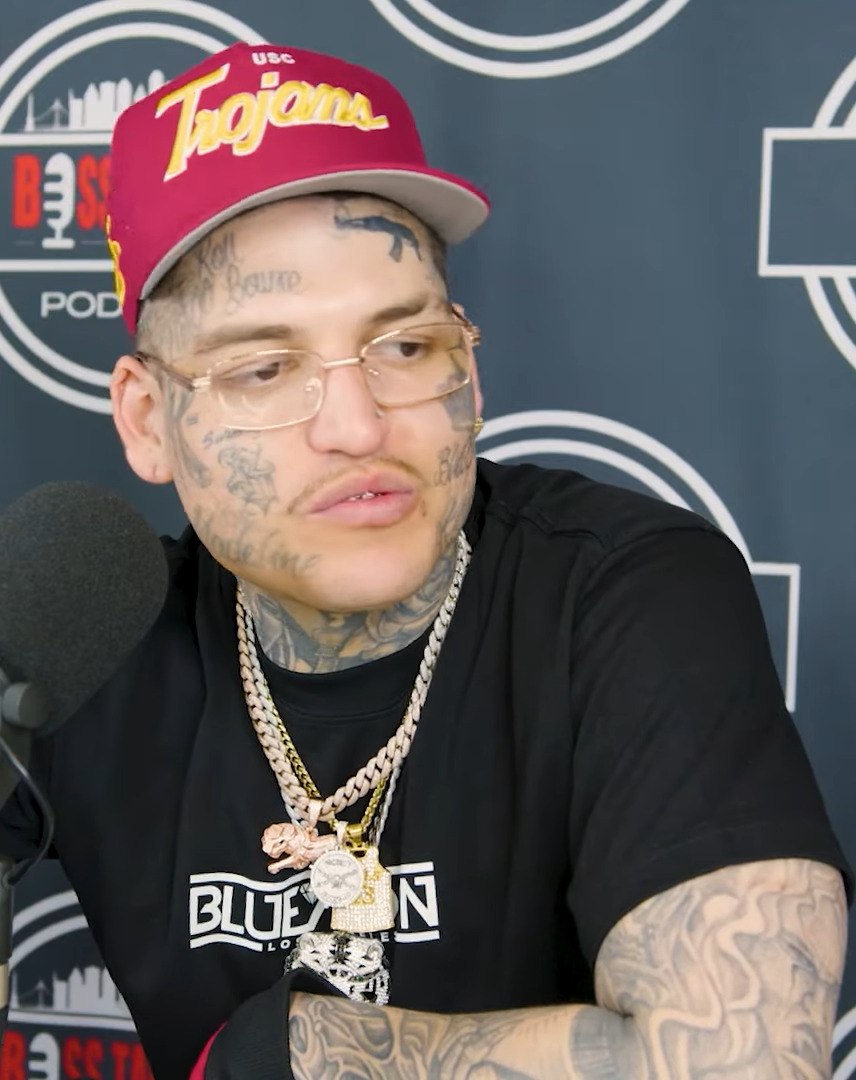
- Lefty Gunplay in 2025

Background information
- Born: Franklin Scott Holladay; April 28, 1996 (age 30); Baldwin Park, California, U.S.
- Genre: West Coast hip-hop
- Occupation: Rapper
- Instrument: Vocals
- Years active: 2023–present
- Labels: Diamond Lane; OTR

Franklin Scott Holladay (born April 28, 1996), better known by his stage name Lefty Gunplay, is an American rapper. Born and raised in Baldwin Park, California, Holladay is signed to OTR Records and JasonMartin's Diamond Lane Music Group. He gained recognition and received a Grammy along with Kendrick for "Best Rap Song" at the 68th Annual Grammy Awards for his appearance on Kendrick Lamar's 2025 single "TV Off".

== Early life ==
With his mother and grandmother, Holladay grew up in a mobile trailer park in Baldwin Park, California. His mother is half Guatemalan and half Mexican, and his father is white, from Mississippi. His first encounter with music happened in high school when, for a talent show, he performed songs by Kanye West and 50 Cent and won. All through high school, Holladay played varsity-level sports like baseball, football, and basketball. While incarcerated for several years after high school, Holladay met the rapper Jap5 who encouraged him to pursue rapping.

== Career ==
After being released from prison, Holladay pursued a career as a hip-hop artist. In 2023, Holladay released two singles, "Spin the Block" and "Certified Stepper.” Shortly afterward, in December, he was signed to OTR Records, an independent label based in Los Angeles. A few months later, in February 2024, he released his debut album, Rookie of the Year. Throughout the year, he released three more albums: Famous Gangbanger, PreSeason, and Most Valuable Gangbanger.

In November 2024, Holladay was featured on "TV Off" by Kendrick Lamar, a single from Lamar's album GNX. The song charted in numerous countries and peaked in second place on the Billboard Hot 100. Reports indicate that the feature made streaming numbers for Holladay's entire catalog increase by 84%. In an interview, Holladay stated that he recorded a few other songs with Lamar during their studio sessions and stated that a deluxe version of GNX was coming. He additionally pushed back on Drake's decision to pursue legal action against Universal Music Group for proceeding with the release of Lamar's "Not Like Us" diss track.

He signed to JasonMartin's label Diamond Lane Music Group in 2025. Holladay released his sixth studio album Ghetto Heisman on 19 September 2025, with guest appearances from RJMrLA, Alemán, Waka Flocka Flame, Hit-Boy, and 03 Greedo among others.

== Discography ==
Studio albums

- Rookie of the Year (2024)
- Famous Gangbanger (2024)
- PreSeason (2024)
- Most Valuable Gangbanger (2024)
- Can't Get Right (2025) (Hosted by JasonMartin)
- Ghetto Heisman (2025)

== Awards and nominations ==
List of awards and nominations received by "TV Off"
Year	Award	Category	Nominated work	Result	Ref.
2026	Grammy Awards	Best Rap Performance	"TV Off" (with Kendrick Lamar)	Nominated	
2026	Grammy Awards	Best Rap Song	"TV Off" (with Kendrick Lamar)	Won	
