= Walk with Me =

Walk with Me may refer to:

== Music ==
- Walk with Me (Jamelia album), 2006
- Walk with Me (Monika Linkytė album), 2015
- Walk with Me (Bugzy Malone EP), 2015
- Walk with Me (Rotimi EP), 2019
- "Walk with Me" (Måns Zelmerlöw and Dotter song), 2019
- Walk with Me (Cosmo's Midnight song), 2015
- "Walk with Me", a 1966 song by The Seekers
- "Walk with Me", a 2002 song by Seven and the Sun
- "Walk with Me", a 2003 song by Joe Budden, from the album Joe Budden
- "Walk with Me", a 2010 song by Neil Young, from the album Le Noise
- "Walk with Me", a 2018 song by Elias, from the EP WWE: Walk with Elias

== Film, television, and video games ==
- Walk with Me (2016 film), a Danish film
- Walk with Me (2017 film), a documentary about Thích Nhất Hạnh
- Walk with Me (2019 film), a Malaysian-Hong Kong horror film
- "Walk with Me" (The Walking Dead), a television episode
- Walk with Me! or Personal Trainer: Walking, a 2008 Nintendo DS exergaming application
- Walk with Me (2021 film), an American independent film
