= Lifestyle (Rich Gang song) =

2014 single by Rich Gang featuring Young Thug and Rich Homie Quan

Single by Rich Gang featuring Young Thug and Rich Homie Quan
- Released: June 5, 2014
- Recorded: 2014
- Genre: Hip hop; trap; mumble rap
- Length: 4:29
- Label: Cash Money; Republic
- Songwriters: Bryan Williams; Jeffery Williams; Dequantes Lamar; London Holmes
- Producer: London on da Track

Rich Gang singles chronology
"Tapout" (2013)	"Lifestyle" (2014)

Young Thug singles chronology
"About the Money" (2014)	"Lifestyle" (2014)	"Low" (2014)

Rich Homie Quan singles chronology
"Walk Thru" (2013)	"Lifestyle" (2014)	"Flex (Ooh, Ooh, Ooh)" (2015)

"Lifestyle" is a song by American hip hop group Rich Gang, featuring performances from American rappers Young Thug and Rich Homie Quan. The song, produced by London on da Track, was released on June 5, 2014. It has been certified Platinum in the United States.

== Background and composition ==
The song premiered in May 2014 as the lead single for the unreleased mixtape Rich Gang 2.

== Critical reception ==
Pitchfork ranked the song at number 69 on their list of the top 100 songs of 2014. Complex named the song at number two on their list of the 50 best songs of 2014. Brooklyn Russell of Pretty Much Amazing described it as "a sort of Millennial version of Generation X's 'Nuthin' but a 'G' Thang'", calling it "an all-encompassing generational hip-hop party track". Russell also praised the song's production, adding: "Thug comes through over a breezy instrumental and casually gives us the now iconic opening line: 'I did a lot of shit just to live this here lifestyle'".

== Music video ==
A music video for "Lifestyle", directed by Be El Be, was released on June 29, 2014. The video features Birdman, Young Thug, Rich Homie Quan, and others partying with women on a plane and yacht. Mack Maine, Soulja Boy, and the song's producer London on da Track make cameo appearances.

== Remixes ==
In August 2014, American rapper Lil Boosie released his remix of "Lifestyle". On September 29, shortly after being signed to Rich Gang and Cash Money Records, Atlanta-based singer Jacquees released a video to his remix of "Lifestyle". Another remix of the song by Atlanta-based rapper Waka Flocka Flame was released in October 2014. In March 2023, country-pop artist Morgan Wallen interpolated the song for his track "180 (Lifestyle)" on his album One Thing at a Time.

== Live performances ==
Young Thug and Rich Homie Quan performed the song at the 2014 BET Hip Hop Awards on October 14, 2014.

== In legal cases ==
In the YSL Records racketeering trial, the representative of Young Thug, Brian Steel, urged the judge to play the music video to show how YSL's clothing style is unaffiliated with gangs.

== Charts ==
=== Weekly charts ===
Chart (2014)	Peak position
Belgium Urban (Ultratop Flanders)	40
US Billboard Hot 100	16
US Hot R&B/Hip-Hop Songs (Billboard)	4
US R&B/Hip-Hop Airplay (Billboard)	1

=== Year-end charts ===
Chart (2014)	Position
US Billboard Hot 100	72
US Hot R&B/Hip-Hop Songs (Billboard)	19

== Certifications ==
Region	Certification	Certified units/sales
New Zealand (RMNZ)	2× Platinum	60,000^{‡}
United Kingdom (BPI)	Silver	200,000^{‡}
United States (RIAA)	Platinum	1,000,000^{‡}
^{‡} Sales+streaming figures based on certification alone.

== Release history ==
Country	Date	Format	Label
United States	June 5, 2014	Digital download	Cash Money; Republic
United States	August 19, 2014	Rhythmic contemporary radio	Cash Money; Republic
