= Walk with Me (Rotimi EP) =

EP by Rotimi
- Released: May 24, 2019
- Length: 23:00
- Label: FrontRo; Empire
- Producer: Ayo; H-Money; Xeryus G; Darlington Peters; Joseph Peters

Rotimi chronology
Jeep Music Vol. 1 (2017)	Walk with Me (2019)	The Beauty of Becoming (2019)

Singles from Walk with Me
- 1. "Love Riddim" Released: April 18, 2019

Walk with Me is the second extended play (EP) by Nigerian-American recording artist Rotimi. The EP was released on May 24, 2019, by FrontRo Music Group and Empire Distribution.

== Track listing ==
No.	Title	Writer(s)	Length
1.	"Legend"		2:52
2.	"Decisions"		3:22
3.	"Love Riddim"		3:39
4.	"Sip Slow"	Darlington Peters, Joseph Peters, Ruwan Wijetunga	3:18
5.	"I Can't Blame You"		3:07
6.	"Summertime"		3:22
7.	"Push Button Start" (featuring Vanessa Bling)		2:59

== Charts ==
Chart (2019)	Peak position
US Independent Albums (Billboard)	41
US Heatseekers Albums (Billboard)	10
