= Selfish (rapper) =

- Born: Damien Douglas Jr. January 30, 1996 (age 30); Denver, Colorado
- Origin: Denver, Colorado
- Genres: Hip-hop, R&B
- Occupation: Rapper. Singer. Songwriter. Engineer
- Years active: 2013 - Present
- Label: TLTC Records. EMPIRE

Damien Douglas Jr. (born January 30, 1996), better known by his stage name Selfish (often stylized as SELFISH.), is an American rapper, singer, songwriter and engineer from Denver, Colorado. He previously went by the stage name of Damien the Architect. In May 2017, he signed a distribution contract with Empire Distribution. On May 23, 2017, he released his debut album, For Your Girl Too.

== Discography ==
=== Studio albums ===
Title	Album details
For Your Girl Too	Released: May 23, 2017; Label: TLTC Records, Empire; Format: Digital download

=== Mixtapes ===
==== (previously under the name of Damien the Architect) ====
Title	Album details
The One (Hosted By DJ Shon)	Released: June 24, 2014; Format: Digital download
Falling Asleep in Church: Disc 1	Released: October 30, 2015; Format: Digital download
PBJ & Noodles: Disc 2	Released: January 30, 2016; Format: Digital download
HEY! (with Hadj)	Released: January 13, 2017; Format: Digital download
