= Nef the Pharaoh =

American rapper

- Also known as: Nef the Pharaoh
- Born: Tonee Hayes; January 11, 1995 (age 31); Oakland, California, U.S.
- Origin: Vallejo, California, U.S.
- Genre: Hip hop
- Occupations: Rapper, songwriter
- Instrument: Vocals
- Years active: 2014–present
- Labels: KILFMB; Sick Wid It; Empire

Tonee Hayes (born January 11, 1995), better known by his stage name Nef the Pharaoh, is an American rapper from Vallejo, California. In 2014 he was selected by fans as the "Bay Area Freshman of the Year" in a yearly contest held by Thizzler.com. In early 2015, his track "Big Tymin'" became a regional hit, with a music video released shortly after Nef the Pharaoh signed with Sick Wid It Records. "Big Tymin'" was remixed by YG and Ty Dolla $ign in July 2015, and his self-titled debut EP was released on Sick Wid It on November 6, 2015. He released his full-length debut album titled The Chang Project on April 27, 2017.

== Early life ==
Tonee Hayes was born on January 11, 1995, in Oakland, California. He was featured on the cover of the Vallejo Times-Herald at the age of 17. Hayes has cited Vallejo rappers like Mac Dre and E-40 as significant influences on his style. He was given the nickname Nef (short for nephew) from his uncle, which he incorporated into part of his stage name. He went to Inderkum High School and later transferred to Discovery High School.

== Music career ==
=== Early releases ===
Starting his music career as an "internet freestyler," in 2014 Nef the Pharaoh had what Vice Media referred to as a "local hit" with the single "Bitch I'm From Vallejo." In 2014, E-40 contacted Giggles about Bay Cookies, and Nef the Pharaoh was subsequently featured on E-40's Sharp On All 4 Corners album. In 2014 he was selected by fans as the "Bay Area Freshman of the Year" held by Thizzler.com. Early on he performed at the last held "Bay Area Freshman" concert. His single "I'm From Vallejo" was remixed with features from E-40 and Willie Joe of Vallejo. As of copyright, Nef the Pharaoh was working on his new album.

=== "Big Tymin'" single (2015) ===
In July 2015 Nef the Pharaoh released his track "Big Tymin'" which featured lyrics paying tribute to Big Tymers members Birdman and Mannie Fresh. The song is "an homage to New Orleans bounce music."

"Nef's other records suggest a more pertinent rap influence is the languid precision of Mac Dre — while the mood has the reassuring warmth of a springtime sunbeam. This spirit perfectly captures the whimsical goofiness of the Big Tymers. Built on the slumping Bay Area rhythmic template popularized by DJ Mustard, Nef dodges the derivative; as a rapper, he lets the energy lead and the bars follow, boasting and flexing with the kinds of memorable banalities...that make up some of hip-hop's best yet least-celebrated moments. Everything about the record suggests tossed-off effervescence, its formal components underlining its unpretentious messaging."

— — Pitchfork Media

Pitchfork called "Big Tymin'" a "major hit," writing "its lyrics are loosely structured and almost free-associative." Complex Magazine wrote in May 2015 that "Big Tymin'" is "a Bay-style tribute to classic Cash Money... compared with Bankroll Fresh, whose 'Hot Boy' flipped a similar trick, 'Big Tymin" is bright, upbeat fun—much closer in spirit to its inspiration than the ATLien's dour repetition." The Vice Media site Noisey wrote about the track that "with 'Big Tymin',' he has another clap on his hands. Paying homage to Cash Money’s Big Tymers, Nef goes in on a minimal beat...."

=== Remixes and performances (2015-present) ===
External videos
- Nef The Pharaoh - Big Tymin' (Official Music Video) (Jan 19, 2015)

The music websites Noisey and Thizzler on the Roof included "Big Tymin'" on their On the Roof Vol. 2: Mob Forever, dedicated to The Jacka in May 2015. After "Big Tymin" had become known regionally, Nef the Pharaoh signed with E-40's Sick Wid It label in early 2015, and they re-released the track. "Big Tymin'" was remixed by YG and Ty Dolla $ign in July 2015, with the remix premiering on sites such as Hotnewhiphop.com on July 25 and RapUp.com.

In October 2015, Nef the Pharaoh freestyled live on the radio station Power 106, and he has also performed live on KMEL-FM. His self-titled debut EP was released on Sick Wid It on November 6, 2015.Complex was one of the websites to stream the EP live and give it a positive review, with HipHopDX also streaming it. He performed a release show in downtown Oakland for the EP. As of 2015, he was working on a collection of pre-rolled joints to sell at Bay Area cannabis clubs, with plans to launch an apparel line and his own music label KILFMB. He released his debut album, The Chang Project.

In August 2018, Nef the Pharaoh released Blow up Bed, a song which featured Los Angeles rapper 03 Greedo. The song was chosen as "Best new Music" by Pitchfork.com.

== Personal life ==
Hayes' son was born in 2014. He has an older sister and two younger brothers.

== Discography ==
=== Studio albums ===
- The Chang Project (2017)
- The Big Chang Theory (2018)
- Mushrooms & Coloring Books (2019)
- HearYEE HearYEE (2020)
- SINsational (2021)
- The Tonite Show With Nef The Pharaoh (2021) (with DJ Fresh)
- The Tonite Show (Deluxe Edition) With Nef The Pharaoh (2022) (with DJ Fresh)
- 4Eva The Pharaoh (2023)
- Vallejo Playa (2024)
- CHANGSZN 4 (2026)

=== Compilation Albums ===
- Sick Wid It: The Year Of The Pig (2019) (with Sick Wid It)

=== Extended plays ===
- Nef The Pharaoh (2015)
- Porter 2 Grape (2018) (with 03 Greedo)
- Vice Versa (2018) (with ShooterGang Kony)
- CHANGSZN (2020)
- CHANGSZN 2 (2020)
- Welcome To Fatherhood (2024)
- CHANGSZN 3 (2025)
- 707ERS (2025) (with Jbadge)

=== Mixtapes ===
- Rich By 25 Two (2014)
- Neffy Got Wings (2015) (with Cardo Got Wings)
- The Lost Tapes (2016)
- Fresh Outta Space 3 (2016)

=== Singles ===
==== as Featured artist ====
War With Me - Kt Foreign ft. Yhung TO, Nef The Pharaoh

Bully Tha Bullie$ - Lynne Tracy, Kent Kern

=== Guest appearances ===
List of non-single guest appearances, with other performing artists, showing year released and album name
Title	Year	Artist(s)	Album
"707"	2014	E-40, Willie Joe	Sharp On All 4 Corners: Corner 1
"Old School Hyphy"	2015	Corn	—N/a
"You Know It"	2015	DJ Mustard, Big Mike, Splacc	10 Summers: The Mixtape, Vol. 1
"Get It In" (Remix)	2016	Lil Yase, Mozzy, G-Val, Lil Blood, Yatta	—N/a
"Slappin'"	2016	E-40, DRAM	—N/a
"Statue of Liberty"	2016	Philthy Rich, E-40, Ezale	Real Niggas Back in Style
"Tap In"	2016	A.D., Sorry Jaynari, E-40	By the Way
"Moxie Java"	2016	Rexx Life Raj	Father Figure
"Stupidly Crazy"	2016	DJ Esco, Casey Veggies	Project E.T.
"#1"	2016	Dev	—N/a
"Max That Btch"	2016	AV, LaVish	I Got the Streets
"In My Way"	2016	Kid Ink, Mozzy, Bricc Baby Shitro	RSS2
"Get Me Some"	2016	J. Stalin, Lil Blood	On Behalf of the Streets 2
"The Grit Don't Quit"	2016	E-40	The D-Boy Diary: Book 1
"Bring Back the Sideshow"	2016	E-40, Mistah F.A.B.	The D-Boy Diary: Book 2
"Chase Dat Money"	2017	Mozzy, Show Banga	Fake Famous
"Fck Some Up"	2017	June, Young Mezzy	Same Enemy
"Toss It"	2017	Snoop Dogg, Too Short	Neva Left
"Fail to Realize"	2017	Droop-E, E-40, Bandz Talk	Trillionaire Thoughts
"Other Side"	2017	G Perico	2 tha Left
"Out Da Hood"	2017	JL	DIBKIS
"Friends"	2018	Iamsu!	06 Solara
"Save All That Love"	2018	Too Short, Mozzy, Mistah F.A.B.	The Pimp Tape
"Racks"	2019	Rick Rock, Goldie Gold, Mazerati Ricky	Rick Rock Beats
"Charlie 2"	2019	ShooterGang Kony, Daboii, Mike Sherm	Second Hand Smoke
"Can't Keep My Eyes"	2019	Berner, OMB Peezy	La Plaza

== See also ==
- List of artists on Sick Wid It Records
- List of northern California rappers
