= Back to the Basics (mixtape) =

Mixtape by Rich Homie Quan
- Released: April 14, 2017
- Recorded: 2016–17
- Genre: Hip hop
- Length: 34:50
- Label: RAIS; Motown
- Producer: Lee Major; Trauma Tone; Izze The Producer; Robin Banks; Cassius Jay; Yung Lan; Zaytoven; Willie Jerome Byrd; Cyko; DI; Bado; Malvo

Rich Homie Quan chronology
If You Ever Think I Will Stop Goin' in Ask RR (2015)	Back to the Basics (2017)	Rich as in Spirit (2018)

Singles from Back to the Basics
- 1. "Replay" Released: March 17, 2017; 2. "Gamble" Released: July 31, 2017

Back to the Basics is the eighth and final mixtape by American rapper Rich Homie Quan. It was released on April 14, 2017, by Motown Records. It serves as Quan's first commercial release with Motown.

== Singles ==
The lead single, "Replay" was released on March 17, 2017.

The second single, "Gamble was released on July 31, 2017.

=== Promotional singles ===
The promotional single, "Da Streetz" was released on March 31, 2017.

The second promotional single, "Heart Cold" was released on April 7, 2017.

== Commercial performance ==
Back to the Basics debuted at number 74 on the Billboard 200 chart.

== Track listing ==
No.	Title	Producer(s)	Length
1.	"Never Made It"	Will-A-Fool
2.	"Heart Cold"	Izze the Producer; Robin Banks
3.	"Back End"	Cassius Jay
4.	"Lord Forgive Me"	Trauma Tone
5.	"Gamble"	D.I.
6.	"Word of Mouth"	Yung Lan
7.	"Da Streetz"	Zaytoven
8.	"Money Fold"	Trauma Tone
9.	"Replay"	Lee Major; Trauma Tone
10.	"Safe" (featuring Cyko)	The 90's
11.	"Str8"	Malvo the Great

== Charts ==
Chart (2017)	Peak position
US Billboard 200	74
US Top R&B/Hip-Hop Albums	42
