= 2nd Nature (group) =

American R&B musical group

- Origin: Seattle, Washington, U.S.
- Genres: R&B, pop
- Years active: 1993–1995
- Label: Intermix
- Past members: Leland "L.A." Allen; Darnel Alexander; David Booker; Jason Turner

2nd Nature was an American R&B group from Seattle, Washington. The group consisted of vocalists Jason Turner, Darnel Alexander, David Booker, and Leland "L.A." Alen. They released one album, What Comes Natural, in 1994.

== History ==
2nd Nature was formed in 1993 by Jason Turner, Darnel Alexander, and David Booker. At the time, they were performing in Seattle, Washington, as the group 3rd Level. Oman Quijano, a record producer, discovered 3rd Level during a local talent audition for the television series Star Search in 1993, and added Leland "L.A." Allen to the group soon afterward. In 1994, they signed with Seattle-based Intermix Records. with their single "Can U Show Me", with a cover of "Lift Every Voice and Sing" on the B-side. Gavin Report writer JMJ McWilliams called the song a "warm slow jam" while also praising the group's harmonies. The song was included on an album for Intermix titled What Comes Natural. South Florida Sun Sentinel writer Sherri Winston gave the project a mixed review. She called the songs "smooth, strong, and sexy" and considered the lyrics less sexually explicit than their contemporaries, but also thought the project was lacking in thematic variety. The group promoted the album with a tour that started in April 1995 in Muskegon, Michigan. Although they released no further material for Intermix, Alexander and Booker collaborated with saxophonist Pamela Williams on her song "I'll Be There for You" in 1998.

== Discography ==
- What Comes Natural (1995)

=== Chart history ===
Year	Title	Album	US R&B
1995	"Can U Show Me"	What Comes Natural	89
