= Type of Way =

Single by Rich Homie Quan

from the album Still Goin In: Reloaded
- Released: February 9, 2013
- Recorded: 2013
- Genre: Hip hop; trap
- Length: 4:16
- Label: T.I.G.; Def Jam
- Songwriter: Dequantes Lamar
- Producers: Yung Carter, Jeremy Daigle

Rich Homie Quan singles chronology
"Difference" (2013)	"Type of Way" (2013)	"My Nigga" (2013)

Music video
- "Type of Way" on YouTube

"Type of Way" is a song by American rapper Rich Homie Quan, released on February 9, 2013 as the second single from Quan's third mixtape Still Goin In: Reloaded (2013). The song was written by Quan and produced by Yung Carter, and Jeremy Daigle out of Lake Charles, Louisiana. It was issued through Think It's a Game (T.I.G.) Entertainment and Def Jam Recordings, and is Quan's only release on the latter label. On September 27, 2013, the official remix, featuring Jeezy and Meek Mill was released. The song garnered positive reviews from critics for both Quan's unique flow and Carter's production creating a catchy anthem.

"Type of Way" peaked at number 50 on the Billboard Hot 100, his highest charting solo single on that chart until 2015's "Flex (Ooh, Ooh, Ooh)". It also peaked at numbers 8, 12 and 21 on the Hot Rap Songs, Hot R&B/Hip-Hop Songs and Rhythmic charts, respectively. The song was certified gold by the Recording Industry Association of America (RIAA), signifying domestic sales of over 500,000 units. An accompanying music video for the song was directed by Motion Family.

== Music video ==
The video premiered on July 14, 2013 on MTV2, and was directed by Motion Family. The video features Quan taking a woman out for a food date and rapping outside an apartment complex with his friends.

== Critical reception ==
Complex ranked the song number six on their list of the 50 best songs of 2013. Complex staff editor David Drake elaborated saying, "Transforming the concept of ambiguity into a boast, the song was as conceptually clever as Meek Mill's "Levels", but was easily the more distinctive composition. Quan might have been rocking someone else's look, but he used a percussive delivery and novel flow, along with that familiar electroshock-to-the-vocal-cords holler, to carve one of the year's most memorable anthems into the collective consciousness." The song was also positioned at number 54 on Pitchfork's list of the top 100 tracks of 2013, with contributor Andrew Ryce saying, "Rich Homie Quan's breakout has all the trappings of a DIY anthem: a killer beat from a relatively unsung producer, a hook so obvious that it makes you wonder how it's never been done before, and several mixtapes' worth of personality in just four minutes. Songs like this launch careers." XXL named it one of the top five hip hop songs of 2013.

== Commercial performance ==
"Type of Way" debuted at number 48 on the Billboard Hot R&B/Hip-Hop Songs chart the week of June 29, 2013 before leaving the next week. It reappeared at number 50 the week of July 13, and reached number 12 the week of September 28, remaining on the chart for twenty-three weeks. The song also debuted at number 98 on the Billboard Hot 100 the week of August 3. Eight weeks later, it peaked at number 50 the week of September 28, staying on the chart for twenty weeks. After eleven months of release "Type of Way" was certified gold by the RIAA for shipments of over 500,000 units in the United States.

== Charts ==
=== Weekly charts ===
Weekly chart performance
Chart (2013)	Peak position
US Billboard Hot 100	50
US Hot R&B/Hip-Hop Songs (Billboard)	12
US Hot Rap Songs (Billboard)	8
US R&B/Hip-Hop Airplay (Billboard)	7
US Rhythmic Airplay (Billboard)	21

=== Year-end charts ===
Annual chart rankings
Chart (2013)	Position
US Hot R&B/Hip-Hop Songs (Billboard)	43
US Hot Rap Songs (Billboard)	37
US Streaming Songs (Billboard)	63

== Certifications ==
Region	Certification	Certified units/sales
United States (RIAA)	Gold	500,000^{‡}
^{‡} Sales+streaming figures based on certification alone.
