= Rich Gang: Tha Tour Pt. 1 =

Rich Gang: The Tour, Part 1

Mixtape by Rich Gang
- Released: September 29, 2014
- Recorded: 2014
- Genre: Hip-hop
- Length: 1:24:03
- Label: Cash Money Records
- Producers: Birdman (exec.); London on da Track (exec.); Young Thug (exec.); Rich Homie Quan (exec.); Red Eyezz (exec.); AM Sharma (exec.); Dun Deal; Erv; Goose; Isaac Flame; Mike Will Made It; Planet9; Sonny Digital; Wheezy

Birdman chronology
The H: The Lost Album Vol. 1 (2013)	Rich Gang: Tha Tour Pt. 1 (2014)	Lost At Sea (2016)

Young Thug chronology
1017 Thug 3: The Finale (2014)	Rich Gang: Tha Tour Pt. 1 (2014)	Barter 6 (2015)

Rich Homie Quan chronology
I Promise I Will Never Stop Going In (2013)	Rich Gang: Tha Tour Pt. 1 (2014)	If You Ever Think I Will Stop Goin' In Ask Double R (2015)

Rich Gang chronology
Rich Gang (2013)	Rich Gang: Tha Tour Pt. 1 (2014)

Rich Gang: The Tour, Part 1 is a mixtape by American rappers Birdman, Young Thug and Rich Homie Quan, billed collectively as Rich Gang. It was released on September 29, 2014, by Cash Money Records. Production was helmed by London on da Track, Issac Flame and Goose, while American rappers Nipsey Hussle, PeeWee Longway, Jacquees, Yung Ralph, Bloody Jay, MPA Duke and MPA Wicced provided guest appearances.

The mixtape loosely succeeds the label's compilation album, Rich Gang (2013), from which both Rich Homie Quan and Young Thug were absent. Rich Gang: Tha Tour was supported by seven promotional singles: "Tell Em (Lies)", "Imma Ride", "Freestyle", "Soldier", "Milk Marie", "Flava" and "Givenchy".

== Background ==
On March 11, 2014, American rappers Young Thug and Rich Homie Quan announced a joint EP to be released in the near future. Rich Homie Quan described it as "best collabo since OutKast." On September 23, 2014, Birdman described Young Thug and Rich Homie Quan's collaboration during an interview with MTV News, saying "They were already working on a project, them two, and I said, 'Let's do it together. Let me take it to the next level for y'all, 'cause I see y'all got the potential and the talent.' I just thought by them being together, it would be a stronger impact and then they still can do their solo things."

== Promotional singles ==
On September 29, 2014, videos for the first and second promotional singles "Tell Em (Lies)" and "Imma Ride" were released ahead of the mixtape. On October 17, 2014, videos for "Freestyle" and "Soldier” were released as the third and fourth promotional singles. On October 27, 2014, Rich Gang premiered the video for the fifth promotional single, "Milk Marie", on 106 & Park. "Flava" and "Givenchy" were subsequently announced as promotional singles.

== Critical reception ==
Professional ratings
Review scores
Source	Rating
Complex	4/5 stars
Exclaim!	8/10
HipHopDX	4.0/5
Pitchfork	8.0/10
Rolling Stone	4/5 stars
Wondering Sound	3.5/5 stars
XXL	4/5

The mixtape received contemporaneous acclaim from music critics. Complex described Tha Tour as "one of the year's best full-length records full stop, a consistently impactful rap record destined to be an indelible artifact of 2014". HipHopDX called it "a trap-love-fest that hypnotizes you for its entirety". Rolling Stone called it a "ridiculously fun mixtape" and described Young Thug as "stretch[ing] his voice like pure nonsense in wheezy, joyful yelps", and Quan's contributions as "cold-soul verses and hooks to give the tape weight and substance". Complex also praised the production on the tape, emphasizing the contributions of London on da Track, saying that he "works a sparse atmosphere of smooth, softened pianos and empty space". Exclaim! praised it as the best rap mixtape of 2014. On Stereogum's Best Albums of 2014, Tha Tour was listed at #21.

The mixtape ranked among the best albums of the 2010s in many publications' decade-end lists. It was ranked 2nd by Noisey, 89th by Stereogum and 97th by Rolling Stone.

The mixtape has developed a legacy for the chemistry between Young Thug and Rich Homie Quan, as well as its blueprint for Atlanta trap music. In 2018, Tom Breihan of Stereogum labelled Rich Gang: Tha Tour Pt. 1 as "a classic of 2010s rap music".

== Track listing ==
Digital download
No.	Title	Producer(s)	Length
1.	"Givenchy" (Young Thug and Birdman)	Dun Deal	5:00
2.	"War Ready" (Rich Homie Quan)	Isaac Flame	3:54
3.	"I Know It" (Rich Homie Quan and Young Thug)	Isaac Flame	4:05
4.	"See You" (Young Thug)	Isaac Flame	4:19
5.	"Beat It Up" (Rich Homie Quan and Young Thug)	Goose	4:02
6.	"Flava" (Young Thug, Birdman and Rich Homie Quan)	Goose; London on da Track; Isaac Flame	5:51
7.	"730" (Young Thug)	London on da Track	4:07
8.	"Hate I" (Rich Homie Quan)	Goose	2:13
9.	"Tell Em (Lies)" (Young Thug and Rich Homie Quan)	London on da Track	4:04
10.	"I Got" (Young Thug featuring Peewee Longway)	Mike Will Made It	3:27
11.	"Milk Marie" (Rich Homie Quan)	Wheezy	3:14
12.	"Imma Ride" (Birdman and Young Thug featuring Yung Ralph)	London on da Track	4:47
13.	"Everything I Got" (Rich Homie Quan)	Goose	4:11
14.	"Keep It Goin" (Young Thug)	London on da Track	4:23
15.	"Bullet" (Rich Homie Quan and Young Thug)	Goose	4:02
16.	"Freestyle" (Birdman, Rich Homie Quan and Young Thug)	Dun Deal	3:43
17.	"Throw Your Hood Up (Bonus track)" (Young Thug featuring Nipsey Hussle and Bloody Jay)	Sonny Digital	5:33
18.	"Soldier (Bonus track)" (Jacquees featuring Rich Homie Quan)	Erv	4:13
19.	"Pull Up (Bonus track)" (Rich Homie Quan and Young Thug)	Goose; Isaac Flame; Dun Deal	3:57
20.	"Who's On Top (Bonus track)" (Young Thug featuring Duke and Wicced)	Planet9	3:52
Total length:			84:03
