= Walk Thru =

2014 single by Rich Homie Quan featuring Problem

Single by Rich Homie Quan featuring Problem

from the album I Promise I Will Never Stop Going In
- Released: February 4, 2014
- Recorded: 2013
- Genre: Hip hop
- Length: 3:07
- Label: T.I.G. Entertainment; Empire
- Songwriters: Dequantes Lamar; Jason Martin
- Producers: Dupri of League of Starz; Problem

Rich Homie Quan singles chronology
"I Know" (2013)	"Walk Thru" (2014)	"Lifestyle" (2014)

Problem singles chronology
"I Don't Want Her" (2014)	"Walk Thru" (2014)	"Or Nah" (2014)

"Walk Thru" is a song by American rapper Rich Homie Quan, released by T.I.G. (Think It's A Game) Entertainment and Empire Distribution on February 4, 2014 as the lead single from his second mixtape, I Promise I Will Never Stop Going In. It features a guest appearance from West Coast rapper Problem, who is credited as a producer alongside Dupri of League of Starz. The music video was released on May 6, 2014; while filming, Quan suffered from two seizures due to heat exhaustion.

"Walk Thru" peaked at number 74 on the US Billboard Hot 100 — becoming Problem's sole entry on the chart — and received platinum certification by the Recording Industry Association of America (RIAA).

== Background ==
"Walk Thru" was originally premiered on November 26, 2013, as a track on Rich Homie Quan's second official mixtape I Promise I Will Never Stop Going In. The song was produced by Dupri from production team League of Starz and Problem, who is also featured on the song. The CD quality version of the song without DJ Drama's tags was released online on January 3, 2014. The song was then released for digital download by T.I.G. Entertainment on February 4, 2014.

The song features Rich Homie Quan crafting a "catchy melody over the instrumental's thudding bass and yawning synths." Problem's appearance adds a West Coast hip hop spin to the incontestable Southern song.

== Critical reception ==
Jimi of The Source said, "Both emcees mesh their different styles of sing-rapping perfectly, almost harmonizing at points. They trade verse back and forth, eventually gliding into their addictive hook that Quan sings. The Atlien brings his unorthodox flow and vocal delivery to share with listeners his struggle and hustle. It is an interesting fusion to say the least".

== Music video ==
The music video for "Walk Thru" was filmed on May 6, 2014 with Problem in Atlanta's Piedmont Park. Shockingly, during the filming Rich Homie Quan experienced heat exhaustion which led to Quan suffering two seizures and a fall that resulted in a head injury. Filming for the music video would later also take place in Problem's hometown Compton, California. The Gabriel Hart-directed video would then be released on July 27, 2014.

== Track listing ==
No.	Title	Producer(s)	Length
1.	"Walk Thru" (featuring Problem)	Dupri of League of Starz; Problem	3:07

== Chart performance ==
=== Weekly charts ===
Chart (2014)	Peak position
Germany (Deutsche Black Charts)	27
US Billboard Hot 100	74
US Hot R&B/Hip-Hop Songs (Billboard)	31
US Hot Rap Songs (Billboard)	20
US R&B/Hip-Hop Airplay (Billboard)	9

=== Year-end charts ===
Chart (2014)	Position
US Hot R&B/Hip-Hop Songs (Billboard)	77

== Certifications ==
Region	Certification	Certified units/sales
United States (RIAA)	Platinum	1,000,000^{‡}
^{‡} Sales+streaming figures based on certification alone.

== Release history ==
Country	Date	Format	Label
United States	February 4, 2014	Digital download	T.I.G. Entertainment
United States	March 15, 2014	Mainstream Urban	T.I.G. Entertainment
