= Rich as in Spirit =

Studio album by Rich Homie Quan
- Released: March 16, 2018
- Genre: Hip-hop
- Length: 58:18
- Labels: RAIS; Motown
- Producers: 30 Roc; Cassius Jay; Ch3f Cookup; Cheeze Beatz; D.I.; Nard & B; Tasha Catour; Twon Beatz; Will-A-Fool; Xeryus G; Zaytoven

Rich Homie Quan chronology
| Back to the Basics (2017) | Rich as in Spirit (2018) | Forever Goin In (2024) |

Singles from Rich as in Spirit
- 1. "Changed" Released: December 15, 2017; 2. "34" Released: February 23, 2018

Professional ratings
Review scores
| Source | Rating |
|---|---|
| HotNewHipHop | 74% |
| Pitchfork | 7.7/10 |
| Spectrum Culture | 3/5 stars |

Rich as in Spirit is the first studio album by American rapper Rich Homie Quan. It was released on March 16, 2018, by Motown Records, and is his only album released during his lifetime. The album has been supported by two singles: "Changed" and "34". It features a sole guest appearance from rapper Rick Ross.

== Background ==
In February 2017, it was announced that Rich Homie Quan has signed a record deal with Motown Records, after that he released the mixtape, Back to the Basics. On March 2, 2018, the album cover, release date and tracklist was revealed.

== Promotion ==
=== Singles ===
The album's lead single, "Changed", was released on December 15, 2017. A music video was released on February 5, 2018.

The album's second single "34" was released on February 23, 2018.

=== Promotional singles ===
The album's promotional single, "The Author" was released on March 2, 2018.

The second promotional single, "Understood" was released on March 9, 2018.

== Commercial performance ==
Rich as in Spirit debuted at number thirty-two on the US Billboard 200, earning 13,844 album-equivalent units of which 3,512 were in pure album sales in its first week of release.

== Track listing ==
Credits adapted from Tidal

Rich as in Spirit
| No. | Title | Writer(s) | Producer(s) | Length |
|---|---|---|---|---|
| 1. | "Reflecting" | Dequantes Lamar; Samuel Gloade; Corey Eborn; Lamont Porter | 30 Roc; Ch3f Cookup | 3:12 |
| 2. | "Fuck wit Me" | Lamar; Devonta Wright | D.I. | 2:55 |
| 3. | "34" | Lamar; Gloade; Porter | 30 Roc | 2:48 |
| 4. | "The Author" | Lamar; James Rosser, Jr.; Brandon Rackley | Nard & B | 3:05 |
| 5. | "Same Year" | Lamar; Gloade; Porter; Antwon Hicks | 30 Roc; Twon Beatz | 3:34 |
| 6. | "Never Fold" | Lamar; Gloade; Porter; Daryl McCorkell | 30 Roc; Cheeze Beatz | 3:15 |
| 7. | "Long Enough" | Lamar; Xavier Dotson; Josh Cross | Zaytoven; Cassius Jay | 3:11 |
| 8. | "No No No" | Lamar; Rosser, Jr.; Rackley | Nard & B | 3:30 |
| 9. | "Perfect Flower" | Lamar; Gloade; Porter | 30 Roc | 3:35 |
| 10. | "Achieving" | Lamar; Cross | Cassius Jay | 2:45 |
| 11. | "Deep" | Lamar; Gloade; Porter | 30 Roc | 2:52 |
| 12. | "Foot Soldier" | Lamar; Gloade; Porter | 30 Roc | 2:42 |
| 13. | "Let's Go Up" | Lamar; Cross | Cassius Jay | 2:41 |
| 14. | "Changed" | Lamar; Cross | Cassius Jay | 2:55 |
| 15. | "Understood" | Lamar; Rosser, Jr.; Rackley | Nard & B | 2:54 |
| 16. | "4rm Me to U" | Lamar; LaTasha Williams; Xeryus Gittens | Tasha Catour; Xeryus G | 2:55 |
| 17. | "Simon Says" | Lamar; Rosser, Jr.; Rackley | Nard & B | 3:14 |
| 18. | "Think About It" (featuring Rick Ross) | Lamar; Rosser, Jr.; Rackley; William Roberts | Nard & B | 3:16 |
| 19. | "Bossman" | Lamar; Willie Byrd | Will-A-Fool | 3:06 |
| Total length: | | | | 58:18 |

== Charts ==
| Chart (2018) | Peak position |
|---|---|
| US Billboard 200 | 32 |
| US Top R&B/Hip-Hop Albums (Billboard) | 19 |
