= OMB Peezy =

American rapper (born 1997)

- OMB Peezy in 2025

Background information
- Born: Le'Paris Kentae Dade; February 2, 1997 (age 29); Mobile, Alabama, U.S.
- Origin: Sacramento, California, U.S.
- Genres: Hip hop; trap
- Occupation: Rapper
- Years active: 2014–present
- Labels: Sick Wid It, 300, Atlantic
- Website: ombpeezymusic.com

Le'Paris Kentae Dade (born February 2, 1997), known professionally as OMB Peezy, is an American rapper based in Sacramento, California. He is originally from Mobile, Alabama.

== Background and career ==
OMB Peezy was born Le'Paris Dade in Mobile, Alabama on February 2, 1997. When Dade was 12, his mother moved him and his siblings to Sacramento, California.

Dade started rapping in late 2015, barely getting attention until he released the song "Lay Down" and its accompanying music video in December 2016. In early 2017, he signed to Sick Wid It Records and later 300 Entertainment. He released "When I Was Down" in May 2017.

Dade also featured in Nef the Pharaoh's song, "Move 4", with Jay Ant, released in 2017. In June 2017, he released the single "Porch." The single "Try Sumthin" featuring Yhung To was released in July 2017. He released the EP Humble Beginnings on October 11, 2017. In July 2018, he released the single "Yeah Yeah" featuring TK Kravitz. The mixtape Loyalty Over Love was released on August 10, 2018. In April 2019, he released the album Preacher to the Streets. In April 2020, he released the single "Everybody". On May 15, he released the mixtape In the Meantime. In November 2020, he featured on The Hunna's remix of "Lost".

On March 5, 2021, his second studio album, Too Deep For Tears, was released. His mixtape with Drum Dummie, In The Meantime 2, was released in November 2021. On August 19, 2022, his mixtape with DJ Drama, Misguided, was released, which included Dade's single with G Herbo, "Mufasa."

== Legal issues ==
In March 2021, Dade was charged with aggravated assault with a deadly weapon and possession of a firearm after allegedly shooting at Roddy Ricch and 42 Dugg while filming a music video on set. In August 2022, the charges against Peezy were dismissed.

In April 2025, Dade was targeted in a shooting in a parking lot after he finished performing at a bar. More than 20 shots were fired at Dade's van as it attempted to leave the lot. No one was injured and no suspects were taken into custody.

== Discography ==
=== Commercial mixtapes ===
Title	Album details	Peak chart positions
Title	Album details	US Heat.
Preacher to the Streets	Released: April 26, 2019; Label: Sick Wid It, 300; Format: Digital download, streaming	—
Too Deep for Tears	Released: March 5, 2021; Label: Overkill Ent., 300; Format: Digital download, streaming	—
Top Kill (with Lil Joc)	Released: September 29, 2023; Label: Blac Noize!; Format: Digital download, streaming	—
Le'Paris	Released: December 1, 2023; Label: Overkill Ent., 300; Format: Digital download, streaming	—
Still Too Deep (with Will A Fool)	Released: September 20, 2024; Label: Overkill Ent., 300; Format: Digital download, streaming	—
Drifting Away	Released: January 17, 2025; Label: Overkill Ent., Hitmaker Music Group; Format: Digital download, streaming	—
OverKrash (with FBLManny)	Released: May 2, 2025; Label: Overkill Ent., Hitmaker Music Group, FBL Entertainment; Format: Digital download, streaming	—
Diary of a Crashout	Released: August 29, 2025; Label: Overkill Ent., Hitmaker Music Group; Format: Digital download, streaming	—
Better and Better	Released: February 20, 2026; Label: Overkill Ent., Hitmaker Music Group; Format: Digital download, streaming	—

=== Compilation albums ===
Title	Album details
Sick Wid It: The Year of the Pig (with Sick Wid It)	Released: December 20, 2021; Label: Sick Wid It; Format: Digital download, streaming

=== Extended plays ===
Title	EP details
Humble Beginnings	Released: October 11, 2017; Label: Sick Wid It, 300; Format: Digital download, streaming

=== Mixtapes ===
List of mixtapes, with selected details
Title	Mixtape details
Young & Reckless (with Sherwood Marty)	Released: January 24, 2018 (US); Label: 300; Format: Digital download
Loyalty Over Love	Released: August 10, 2018 (US); Label: Sick Wid It, 300; Format: Digital download
In the Meantime	Released: May 15, 2020; Label: 300; Format: Digital download
In the Meantime 2 (with Drum Dummie)	Released: November 5, 2021; Label: Overkill Ent., 300; Format: Digital download
Misguided (with DJ Drama)	Released: August 19, 2022; Label: Overkill Ent., 300; Format: Digital download

=== Charted and certified singles ===
Title	Year	Peak chart positions	Certifications	Album
Title	Year	NZ Hot	Certifications	Album
"Lay Down" (solo or remix with GloRilla)	2017	12	RIAA: Gold	Drifting Away
"Big Homie" (solo or remix featuring King Von and Jackboy)	2019	—	RIAA: Gold	Too Deep for Tears
