= Rich Homie Quan =

American rapper (1989–2024)

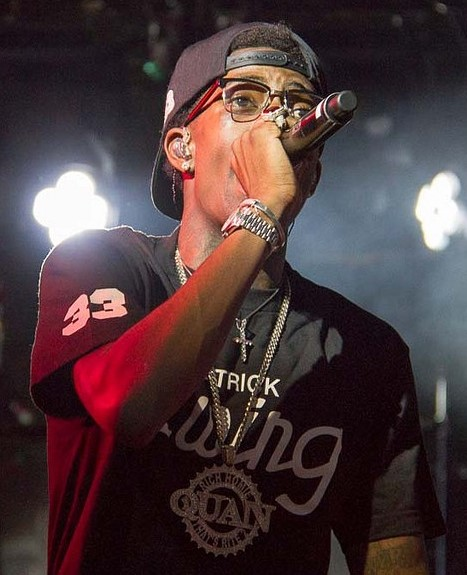
- Quan in 2014

Background information
- Born: Dequantes Devontay Lamar; October 4, 1989 (Note: The Fulton County medical examiner stated that Lamar was 33 upon his death and was born on October 4, 1990. However, multiple interviews and stories about Lamar throughout his music career contradict this and indicate that he was born in 1989.); Atlanta, Georgia, U.S.
- Died: September 5, 2024 (aged 34) Atlanta, Georgia, U.S.
- Cause of death: "Acute multiple drug intoxication" i.e. toxicity
- Genres: Southern hip-hop; trap; mumble rap
- Occupations: Rapper; singer; songwriter
- Works: Rich Homie Quan discography
- Years active: 2011–2024
- Labels: Motown; RAIS; T.I.G.
- Formerly of: Rich Gang
- Children: 4
- Website: richhomiequan.com

Dequantes Devontay Lamar (October 4, 1989 – September 5, 2024), known professionally as Rich Homie Quan, was an American rapper, singer, and songwriter. Beginning his career in 2011, Lamar first saw mainstream success with his 2013 single "Type of Way", which peaked at number 50 on the Billboard Hot 100. Born and raised in Atlanta, Georgia, his 2015 single, "Flex (Ooh, Ooh, Ooh)", saw further success at number 26 on the chart. Alongside fellow Atlanta rapper Young Thug, Lamar was a member of Cash Money Records' spin-off project Rich Gang, who found success with their 2014 single "Lifestyle".

Lamar's debut studio album, Rich as in Spirit (2018), entered the Billboard 200 at number 33. The rapper died from an accidental drug overdose after taking multiple drugs, including fentanyl, alprazolam, codeine, and promethazine in 2024.

== Early life ==
Dequantes Devontay Lamar was born on October 4 (birth year is disputed: 1989 or 1990, both are claimed with an identical date), in Atlanta, Georgia. In school, Lamar had a particular interest in reading. Literature was his favorite subject and he enjoyed creative writing classes. He played baseball for over four years while he attended Atlanta, Georgia's Ronald McNair Sr. High School with the aspiration to play professionally. As center fielder and leadoff hitter, Lamar began playing at the varsity level during his freshman year and earned a scholarship offer from Fort Valley State University. Due to the expense of tuition, Lamar dropped out after two weeks, then got a job at a nearby airport.

When he lost his job, Lamar got involved in burglaries, which led to him spending 15 months in jail. "I never saw myself going this far with music. Music was just a hobby at first. I never saw myself being on stage and rocking out shows. After I got out of jail, I started to take it more serious and that's when my dream came true", he said in an interview with XXL.

Rich Homie Quan was influenced by dirty south music, including Jeezy, Gucci Mane, T.I., Lil Boosie, Lil Wayne, Kilo Ali, Outkast, and Goodie Mob.

== Career ==
In 2012, Lamar's song "Differences" was released as the first single from his mixtape Still Going In. In 2013, he toured with Trinidad James. He was also featured on Gucci Mane's album Trap House III on songs such as "I Heard", "Can't Trust Her" and "Chasin' Paper", which also features Young Thug. Reviewing his single, "Type of Way", The New York Times wrote that he was "part of Atlanta's rising generation of rappers—think Future, Young Thug, Young Scooter—who deliver lines with melody and heart, like singers on the verge of a breakdown". The song peaked at number 50 on the US Billboard Hot 100. Still Goin' In (Reloaded) would be named the tenth best mixtape of 2013 by Rolling Stone.

In August 2013, "Type of Way" was released to the iTunes Store by Def Jam Recordings, suggesting that he had signed to the label. However, Rich Homie Quan was still independent and was considering signing a deal with Cash Money Records. Quan was featured on the song "My Nigga" by YG also featuring Young Jeezy, which peaked at number 19 on the Hot 100. He was also featured on 2 Chainz' second studio album B.O.A.T.S. II: Me Time, on the song "Extra". In September 2013, he confirmed that he was 30% done with his debut album.

His mixtape, called I Promise I Will Never Stop Going In was released on November 26, 2013. It was supported by the single "Walk Thru" featuring Problem. The 2013 Michigan State Spartans football team adopted "Type of Way" as an anthem, and Quan joined them on the sidelines in a green jersey at the 100th Rose Bowl, while also participating in their post-game locker-room celebration singing "Type of Way". He was named to the 2014 XXL freshman class.

On May 6, 2014, Rich Homie Quan went home to Atlanta to shoot the video for his single "Walk Thru" with Los Angeles rapper Problem. Hours later, it was reported that he had two "seizures," falling and "cracking his head" on set, according to TMZ. Rich Homie Quan cleared up the rumors by sending Billboard a statement saying that he fainted and hit his head. In this statement, he denied that the instance had anything to do with drugs. On September 29, 2014, he was part of the mixtape, called Rich Gang: Tha Tour Pt. 1. In February 2015, him, Tyga, Wale, Kid Ink, and YG released the song, "Ride Out," which would be part of the soundtrack for Furious 7.

His song "Flex (Ooh, Ooh, Ooh)" and its music video were released on April 1, 2015, on YouTube. The song peaked at number 26 on the Billboard Hot 100 and the dance Quan did in the music video would become popular on Vine. In April 2015, he released his fifth mixtape, If You Ever Think I Will Stop Goin' In Ask Double R.

On March 16, 2017, Quan released his first single since 2015, "Replay". A mixtape, Back to the Basics followed on April 14, 2017. His debut studio album Rich as in Spirit was released on March 18, 2018. The album was supported by the two singles, "Changed" and "34". The album debuted at number thirty-two on the US Billboard 200.

In October 2022, Quan released the EP Family & Mula, which included the single "Krazy" and one guest appearance from NoCap. Speaking of the EP's release, Quan said he felt good to have a project out after not releasing one in over three years. The EP was re-released on November 18, 2022.

== Legal issues ==
In November 2016, Quan sued his former label Think It's A Game for $2 million for unpaid royalties. The label counter-sued him for breach of contract. Both suits were later settled out of court.

On May 28, 2017, Quan was arrested with four others on felony drug charges after being stopped at a checkpoint on Highway 1 in Louisville, Georgia. Police claimed to have recovered heroin, marijuana, drug paraphernalia, and weapons from the vehicle. Quan was charged with felony drug possession with intent to distribute.

== Personal life and death ==
Lamar had four sons. His oldest was born in 2006, which Lamar did not know about until five years later.

On September 29, 2014, Lamar's father, Corey, was shot during an attempted robbery at a barber shop in Atlanta, but survived.

On September 5, 2024, Lamar's girlfriend told a 911 dispatcher that he was on the couch in the morning and had not moved when she returned from taking her son to school. She stated she could not feel a heartbeat, could not feel him breathing, and when she turned him over, he foamed at the mouth. Lamar died at an Atlanta hospital later that day at the age of 34. An autopsy was performed on September 6. The Fulton County medical examiner concluded that Lamar had died of an accidental overdose after taking multiple drugs, including fentanyl, alprazolam, codeine, and promethazine.

== Discography ==
Studio albums

- Rich as in Spirit (2018)

== Awards and nominations ==
Year	Award	Result	Nominee or nominated work	Category
2014	BET Awards	Nominated	Rich Homie Quan	Best New Artist
2014	BET Hip Hop Awards	Nominated	Rich Homie Quan	Rookie of the Year
2014	BET Hip Hop Awards	Nominated	I Promise I Will Never Stop Going In	Best Mixtape
2015	BET Hip Hop Awards	Nominated	"Flex (Ooh, Ooh, Ooh)"	Best Club Banger
2015	BET Hip Hop Awards	Nominated	"Flex (Ooh, Ooh, Ooh)"	People's Champ Award
2016	iHeartRadio Music Awards	Nominated	"Flex (Ooh, Ooh, Ooh)"	Hip Hop Song of the Year
