= Like Whaaat =

Single by Problem featuring Bad Lucc

from the album Understand Me
- Released: February 12, 2013
- Recorded: 2012
- Genre: Hip hop
- Length: 3:31
- Label: Diamond Lane Music Group
- Songwriters: Jason Martin; Terence Harden
- Producer: League of Starz

Problem singles chronology
"T.O." (2012)	"Like Whaaat" (2013)	"Twerk" (2013)

Bad Lucc singles chronology
"Like Whaaat" (2013)

"Like Whaaat" is a song by American hip hop recording artist Problem, released on February 12, 2013 as a single, which was included on various mixtapes such as The Separation and later on his debut retail EP Understand Me. The song, produced by League of Starz, features a guest appearance from frequent collaborator Bad Lucc of Dubb Union. The song has since peaked at number 20 on the Billboard Bubbling Under Hot 100 Singles.

In 19 June 2024, Problem performed the hit song, for Kendrick Lamar's concert The Pop Out: Ken & Friends at the Kia Forum in Inglewood, California, closing the first set by DJ Hed, titled the Act I – DJ Hed & Friends.

== Background ==
The song's production is backed by minimal synth riffs and midtempo percussion, which was created by upcoming producers League of Starz. It also features distinct samples from Young Bleed's "How You Do That There", which was also sampled on King L's "Full of Dat Weed". Complex credited Problem for reviving the song and turning it into a hit, calling it "a contemporary, thumping re-imagining of the familiar track."

Upon release, "Like Whaaat" was featured in heavy rotation on Los Angeles' Power 106 and many stations in rural Texas, Georgia and North Carolina. On June 6, 2013, hip hop mogul Diddy released a video a promotional video for Revolt TV, featuring him dancing on his private jet to the song. Problem would reference this in the song's remix.

== Music video ==
The music video for "Like Whaaat" was directed by Topself Junior and released on March 19, 2013 via SkeeTV. It featured cameo appearances from West Coast hip hop rappers such as Snoop Dogg, Warren G, E-40, Ab-Soul, Dom Kennedy, Daz Dillinger, Kurupt, and Glasses Malone, among others such as DJ Drama, Tank and Big Boy.

== Critical reception ==
"Like Whaaat" was named number 47 on the "Best Songs of 2013 (So Far)" list made by Complex, published on June 24, 2013.

== Remix ==
The official remix to "Like Whaaat" was released on June 21, 2013 on "Big Boy's Neighborhood" on Power 106. The remix features guest appearances from Master P, Wiz Khalifa, Tyga and Chris Brown replacing Bad Lucc's verse on the song, along with a new verse from Problem. On July 9, 2013, the remix was released as a single to iTunes.

On May 23, 2013, DJ Skee released the official "Skeemix" for the song featuring a verse from rapper Riff Raff. Rappers Jermaine Dupri and Chill Moody have also released freestyles or remixes to the song.

== Chart performance ==
Chart (2013)	Peak position
US Bubbling Under Hot 100 (Billboard)	20
US Hot R&B/Hip-Hop Songs (Billboard)	47
US Heatseekers Songs (Billboard)	19

== Release history ==
Country	Date	Format	Label
United States	February 12, 2013	Digital download	Diamond Lane Music Group
