= Flex (Ooh, Ooh, Ooh) =

Single by Rich Homie Quan

from the album If You Ever Think I Will Stop Goin' in Ask RR (Royal Rich) and Summer Sampler
- Released: February 10, 2015
- Recorded: 2014
- Genre: Hip hop • trap
- Length: 2:56
- Label: T.I.G.; Empire
- Songwriters: Dequantes Lamar; Gary Hill; Chadron Moore
- Producers: DJ Spinz; Nitti Beatz

Rich Homie Quan singles chronology
"Blah Blah Blah" (2014)	"Flex (Ooh, Ooh, Ooh)" (2015)	"Ride Out" (2015)

"Flex (Ooh, Ooh, Ooh)" is a song by American rapper Rich Homie Quan. It was released on February 10, 2015, as a single from his fifth mixtape If You Ever Think I Will Stop Goin' in Ask RR (Royal Rich) and Summer Sampler (2015). It was produced by DJ Spinz and Nitti Beatz.

== Commercial performance ==
The song has peaked at number 26 on the US Billboard Hot 100. This is Rich Homie Quan's highest-charting single as a solo artist. As of August 2015, "Flex (Ooh, Ooh, Ooh)" has sold 425,000 copies domestically.

== Music video ==
A music video for "Flex (Ooh, Ooh, Ooh)" was released on April 1, 2015. It was directed by Be El Be. The video is notable for its high levels of stunting, and also serves as the preeminent example of "hitting the Quan."

== Charts ==
=== Weekly charts ===
Chart (2015)	Peak position
Canada Hot 100 (Billboard)	93
US Billboard Hot 100	26
US Hot R&B/Hip-Hop Songs (Billboard)	8
US Rhythmic Airplay (Billboard)	5

=== Year-end charts ===
Chart (2015)	Position
US Billboard Hot 100	49
US Hot R&B/Hip-Hop Songs (Billboard)	20
US Rhythmic (Billboard)	30

== Certifications ==
Region	Certification	Certified units/sales
New Zealand (RMNZ)	Platinum	30,000^{‡}
United States (RIAA)	4× Platinum	4,000,000^{‡}
^{‡} Sales+streaming figures based on certification alone.

== Awards and nominations ==
Year	Awards	Result	Category
2015	BET Hip Hop Awards	Nominated	Best Club Banger
2015	BET Hip Hop Awards	Nominated	People's Champ Award
2016	iHeartRadio Music Awards	Nominated	Hip Hop Song of the Year
