= JasonMartin =

American rapper (born 1985)

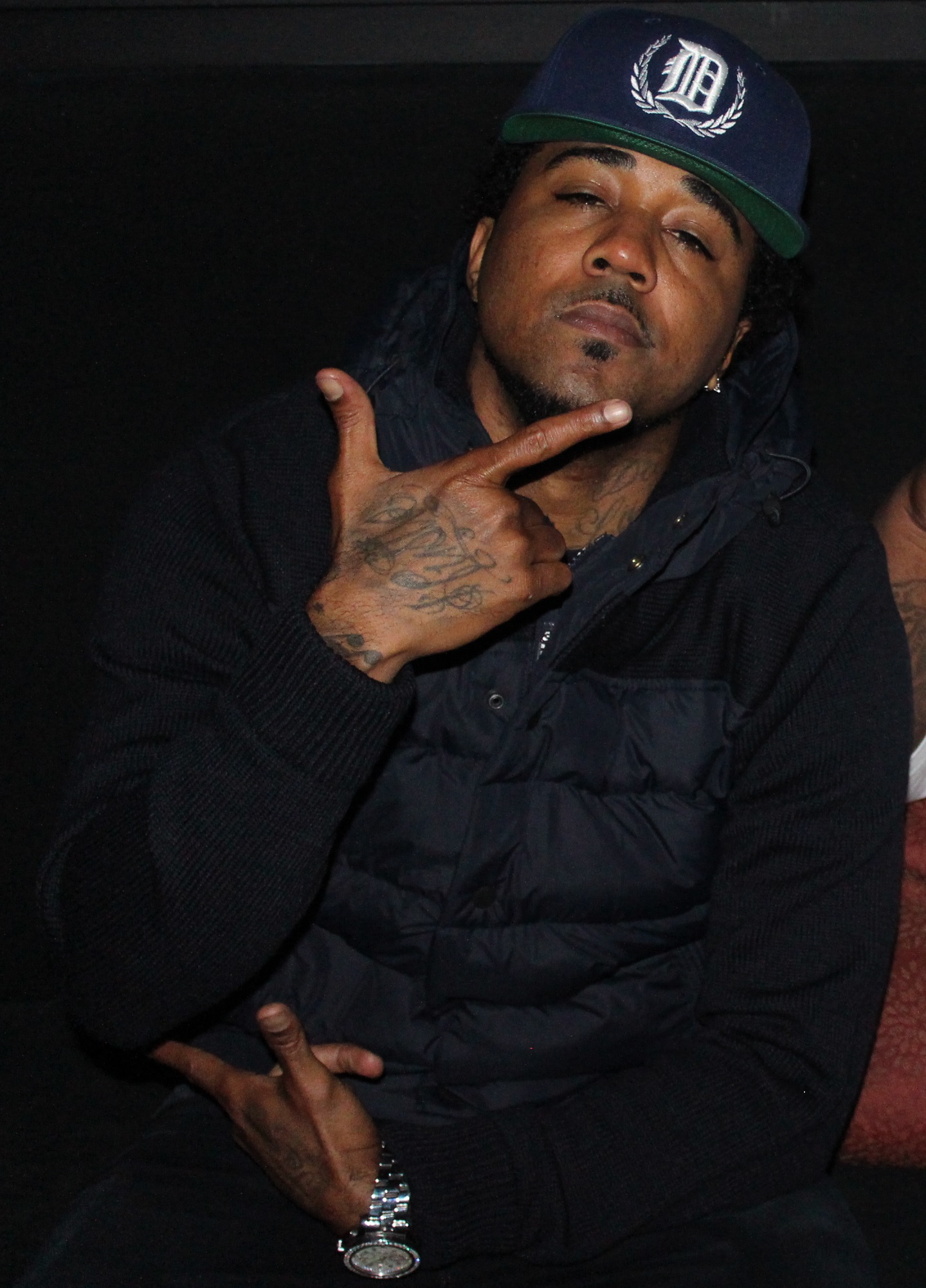
- Martin in December 2013

Background information
- Also known as: Chachi; Problem
- Born: Jason L. Martin; May 8, 1985 (age 41); Würzburg, West Germany
- Origin: Compton, California, U.S.
- Genres: West Coast hip-hop; hyphy
- Occupations: Rapper; songwriter; record producer; actor
- Years active: 2006–present
- Labels: Diamond Lane; Universal Republic; Universal Motown; Cinematic; Universal

Jason L. Martin (born May 8, 1985; stylized as JasonMartin), formerly known by the stage name Problem, is a German-born American rapper from Compton, California. He is best known for his guest appearance on Rich Homie Quan's 2014 single "Walk Thru", which entered the Billboard Hot 100 and received platinum certification by the Recording Industry Association of America (RIAA). Prior, he appeared on E-40's 2012 single, "Function", and Childish Gambino's 2013 single, "Sweatpants", both of which received gold certifications by the RIAA and entered the Bubbling Under Hot 100. His 2013 single, "Like Whaaat" (featuring Bad Lucc), entered the latter chart and preceded his debut extended play, Understand Me (2013).

== Early life ==
Martin was born in Würzburg, West Germany and grew up in Compton, California. He entered the industry by writing a verse for producer Terrace Martin for his song "Be Thankful", featured on Snoop Dogg's compilation album The Big Squeeze. The track garnered praise from notable artists including Nas and Talib Kweli. Martin then began recording records with various West Coast artists such as Daz Dillinger, Kurupt, Snoop Dogg, and DJ Quik.

== Career ==
Martin served as a ghostwriter for other hip hop artists prior to gaining recognition as a rapper himself. He was credited on the 2008 single "Head of My Class" by rapper Scooter Smiff featuring Chris Brown, and made his first mainstream recording appearance on Snoop Dogg's album Malice N Wonderland (2008). He launched his independent record label, Diamond Lane Music Group that same year. With intent on furthering his recording career, he signed with Universal Republic Records to release his 2008 debut commercial single, "I'm Toe Up" and its follow-up, "Whereva U Like". Failing to chart in any known territory, he was promptly dropped from the label.

Six years later, he rebounded with his guest appearance alongside YG and Iamsu! on E-40's 2012 single "Function" which received gold certification by the Recording Industry Association of America (RIAA) and moderately entered both the Bubbling Under Hot 100 and Hot R&B/Hip-Hop Songs charts. Since then, Martin has worked with numerous artists such as Jamie Foxx, the Game, Kendrick Lamar, Bobby V, 9th Wonder, Chris Brown, Wiz Khalifa, Nipsey Hussle, Warren G, Childish Gambino, Pharrell Williams, Jim Jones, Travis Barker, and John Legend, among others. On February 13, 2013, Martin released Million Dollar Afro, a collaborative mixtape with Iamsu! that contains guest appearances from Juvenile, Too Short and Omarion. A song from the mixtape, "Do It Big" featuring Bad Lucc and Sage the Gemini was featured in the 2013 video game Grand Theft Auto V by Rockstar Games, on its radio station, Radio Los Santos.

On June 13, 2013, he released the mixtape The Separation, which contains guest appearances from Wale, T.I., Snoop Dogg, Game, Chris Brown, Tank, Tyga and Wiz Khalifa, among others. His 2013 song "Like Whaaat", featuring Bad Lucc, peaked at number 20 on the Bubbling Under Hot 100 singles chart; it remains his most commercially successful song as a lead artist. On July 23, 2013, he released "Say That Then", featuring Glasses Malone.

In November 2013, Martin announced that he would release his debut album independently through his Diamond Lane label. He revealed that he would be primarily producing the album along with League of Starz. On December 10, 2013, Martin released the commercial extended play Understand Me, which was supported by the aforementioned singles along with its eponymous lead single. Martin appeared in a branded music video alongside Neil Patrick Harris for the drink product Neuro in February 2014.

Martin partnered with the Los Angeles Rams to create the team's theme song, "My Squad", for the 2016-17 NFL season. The release included an official music video that was shot to resemble Snapchat. After gaining regional success on the mixtape circuit, Martin released his debut album, Selfish, in November 2017. He followed up with his second album, S2 on November 30, 2018.

On April 4, 2020, Martin released the short film, A Compton Story. It is narrated by comedian Mike Epps, and contains appearances from Snoop Dogg, Slink Johnson, and Jackie Long. Terrence "Punch" Henderson is credited as the executive producer on the project. In May 2023, Martin released his third album I Owe Myself. In November 2023, Martin released the companion soundtrack to A Compton Story.

Martin is featured on the track "All That" along with Thirsty P, released on 18 October 2024, as the second single off Ab-Soul's sixth album Soul Burger.

On 19 June 2024, Martin performed his hit song "Like Whaaat", for Kendrick Lamar's concert The Pop Out: Ken & Friends at the Kia Forum in Inglewood, California, closing the first set by DJ Hed, titled the Act I – DJ Hed & Friends.

== Diamond Lane Music Group ==
Martin launched his independent record label, Diamond Lane Music Group in 2008. Its roster includes Bad Lucc, Skeme, Lucky Luciano, among others.

Lefty Gunplay signed with the label on 2025.

== Influences ==
His musical influences are Eminem, N.W.A, the Isley Brothers, Prince, Aaliyah, R. Kelly, Baby Bash, Lil Wayne, the Temptations, DJ Quik, the Jacksons, and the group DeBarge.

== Discography ==
- Understand Me (2013)
- Rosecrans: The Album (with DJ Quik) (2017)
- Selfish (2017)
- S2 (2018)
- Coffee & Kush, Vol. 1 (2020)
- Coffee & Kush Vol. 2 (2020)
- I Owe Myself (2023)
- A Compton Story (2023)
- Chupacabra (with DJ Quik) (2024)
- Repack EP (2024)
- Can't Get Right (with Lefty Gunplay) (2025)
