= 2014 in hip-hop =

This article summarizes the events, album releases, and album release dates in hip-hop for the year 2014.

== Events ==
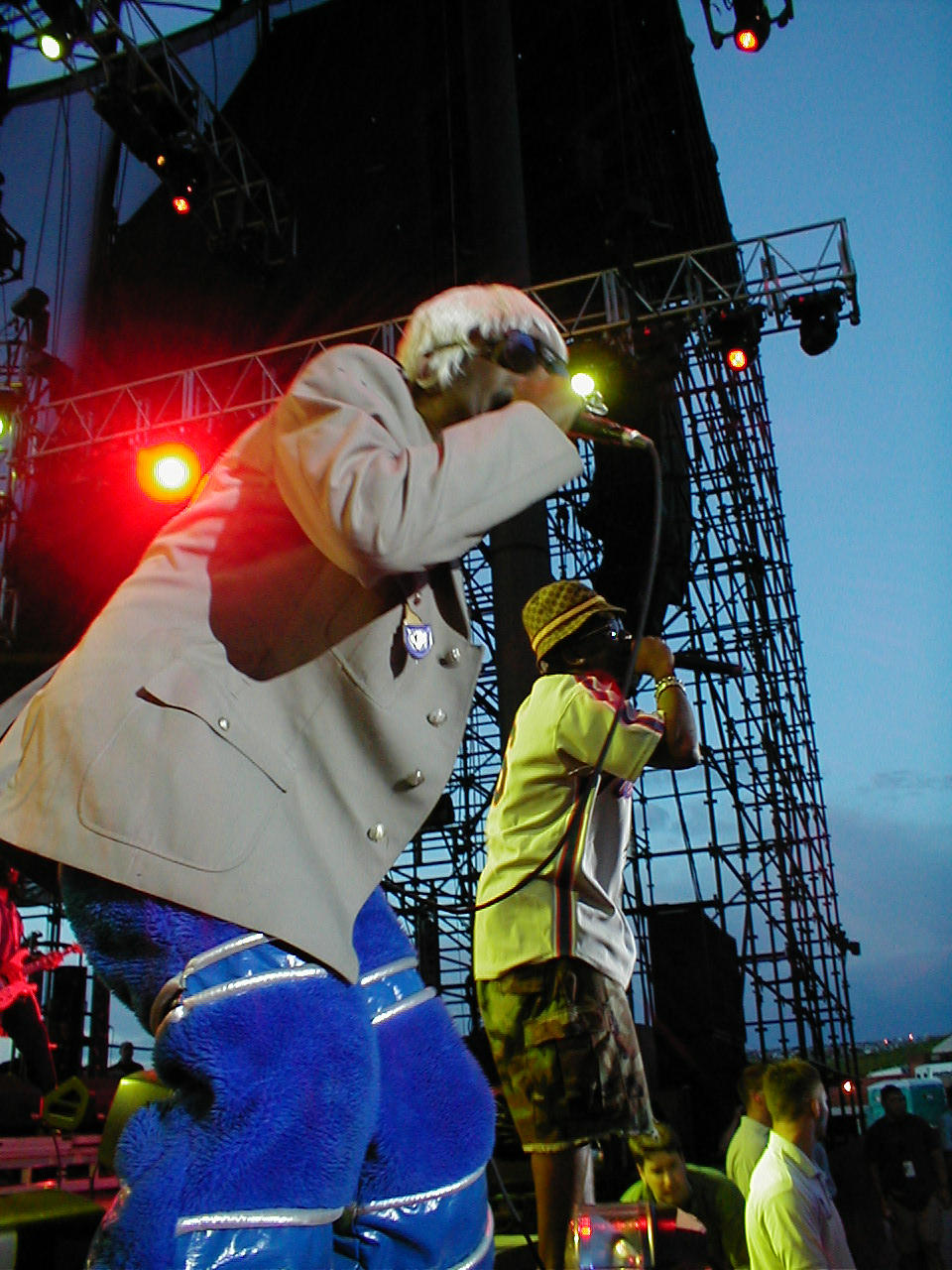
Duo Outkast announced the end of their hiatus on January 15

=== January ===
- On January 8, it was revealed that DJ Drama was given a job as the new A&R for Atlantic Records.
- On January 15, the duo Outkast composed of rappers Big Boi and Andre 3000, announced a reunion tour of over 40 festival dates during 2014.
- On January 26, Macklemore & Ryan Lewis won four Grammy Awards at 56th Annual Grammy Awards, including Best New Artist and Best Rap Album for The Heist. Jay-Z won two Grammys for his two collaborations with Justin Timberlake "Holy Grail" and "Suit & Tie".
- On January 28, J. Cole announced that his record label Dreamville Records had signed a distribution deal with Interscope Records. Later that day Jay-Z gave him his original Roc-A-Fella Records chain.

=== February ===
- On February 1, five rappers French Montana, Jadakiss, Chinx Drugz, Smoke DZA and Buckshot were all arrested on warrants, while leaving B.B. King Blues Club in New York City, where they were attending Funkmaster Flex's Tunnel Party. They would all be released by the next day.
- On February 10, it was revealed that Dr. Dre was suing his former record label Death Row Records for 3 million dollars, due to unpaid royalties.
- On February 20, it was revealed that 50 Cent had officially left Shady Records, Aftermath Entertainment and Interscope Records, also announcing that he was now signed to Caroline Records, an independent sister-label of Capitol Records.

=== March ===
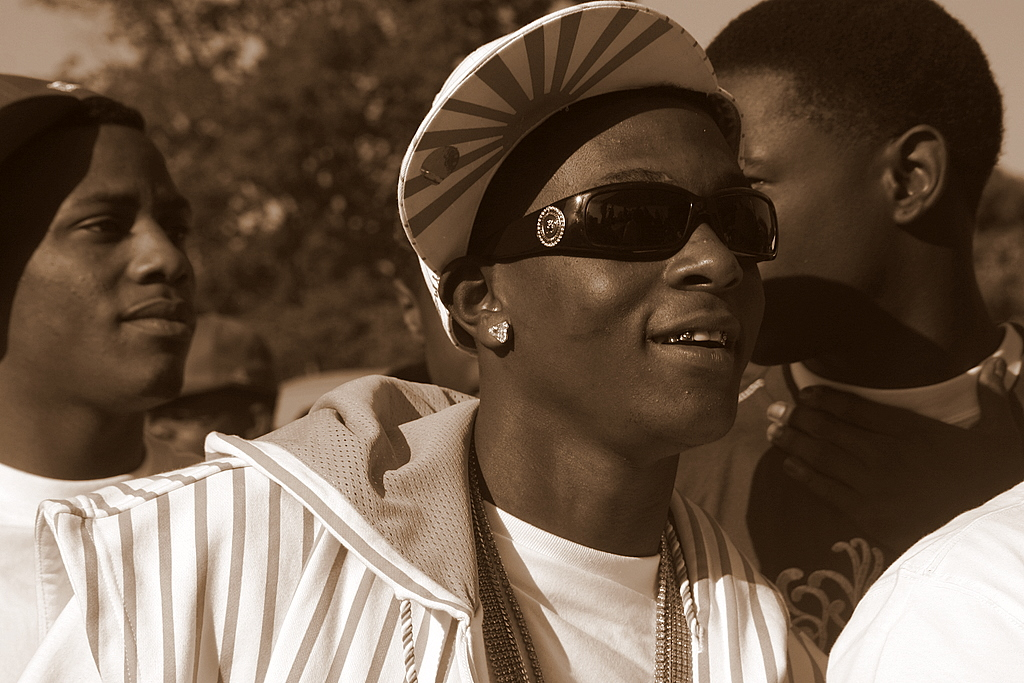
Lil Boosie was released from prison on March 5. He had spent almost five years behind bars. Shortly after he released "Show Da World" and announced a new album Touchdown 2 Cause Hell to be released by Atlantic Records.

- On March 6, Speaker Knockerz was found dead of an apparent heart attack in his garage in Columbia, South Carolina at 19 years old.
- On March 5, Lil Boosie was released from the Louisiana State Penitentiary where he has been incarcerated since 2009 on drug charges.
- On March 9, RondoNumbaNine and Cdai were arrested on murder charges based on their involvement in the murder of a taxi driver named Javan Boyd.
- On March 11, it was revealed that Diddy had bid 200 million dollars on the Madison Square Garden Company-owned Fuse television channel. However, he would be outbid by Jennifer Lopez's NuvoTV.
- On March 12, Freddie Gibbs released "Real", his first diss record towards former boss Young Jeezy.
- On March 13, Petey Pablo was released from prison after serving 35 months in prison after being arrested for gun smuggling.
- On March 14, Chris Brown was arrested and taken to jail until at least April 23, 2014, due to him being kicked out of rehab after he refused to take a drug test, made disturbing comments about his use of weapons, and disobeyed an order placed on him in the facility to remain at least two feet away from all women.
- On March 18, Derek Minor announced that he has left Reach Records, as his two-album contract with the label is now complete.
- On March 23, Jay-Z addressed Drake's recent comments in a Rolling Stone interview regarding Jay-Z's references to art, during Jay Electronica's remix to Soulja Boy's "We Made It". In the song Jay-Z says, "Sorry Mrs. Drizzy for so much art talk / Silly me, rappin' 'bout shit that I really bought / While these rappers rap about guns that they ain't shot / And a bunch of other silly shit that they ain't got."
- On March 25, Diddy changed his stage name back to Puff Daddy for his next studio album MMM.
- On March 28, Migos were involved in a Florida shootout that left one of the members of their entourage in the hospital.
- On March 29, former co-owner of The Source, Benzino, was shot multiple times during his mother's funeral procession.

=== April ===
- On April 3, Tray Deee of Tha Eastsidaz was released from California Men's Colony, where he had been incarcerated since 2005 on attempted murder charges.
- On April 9, Chief Keef's cousin and Glory Boyz Entertainment signee Blood Money was shot and killed in Chicago. Blood Money had been signed to Interscope Records just two weeks prior to his death.
- On April 18, the NYPD thwarted an alleged multimillion-dollar extortion plot by producer Chauncey Mahan against Jay-Z. Mahan who worked with Jay Z from 1998 and 2002, was in possession of a number of Jay-Z master recordings that Jay-Z and his associates assumed were lost. They were estimated to be between $15 million and $20 million.
- On April 27, DJ E-Z Rock of duo Rob Base and DJ E-Z Rock died from unknown cases. The duo was best known for the single "It Takes Two" and its respective album.

=== May ===
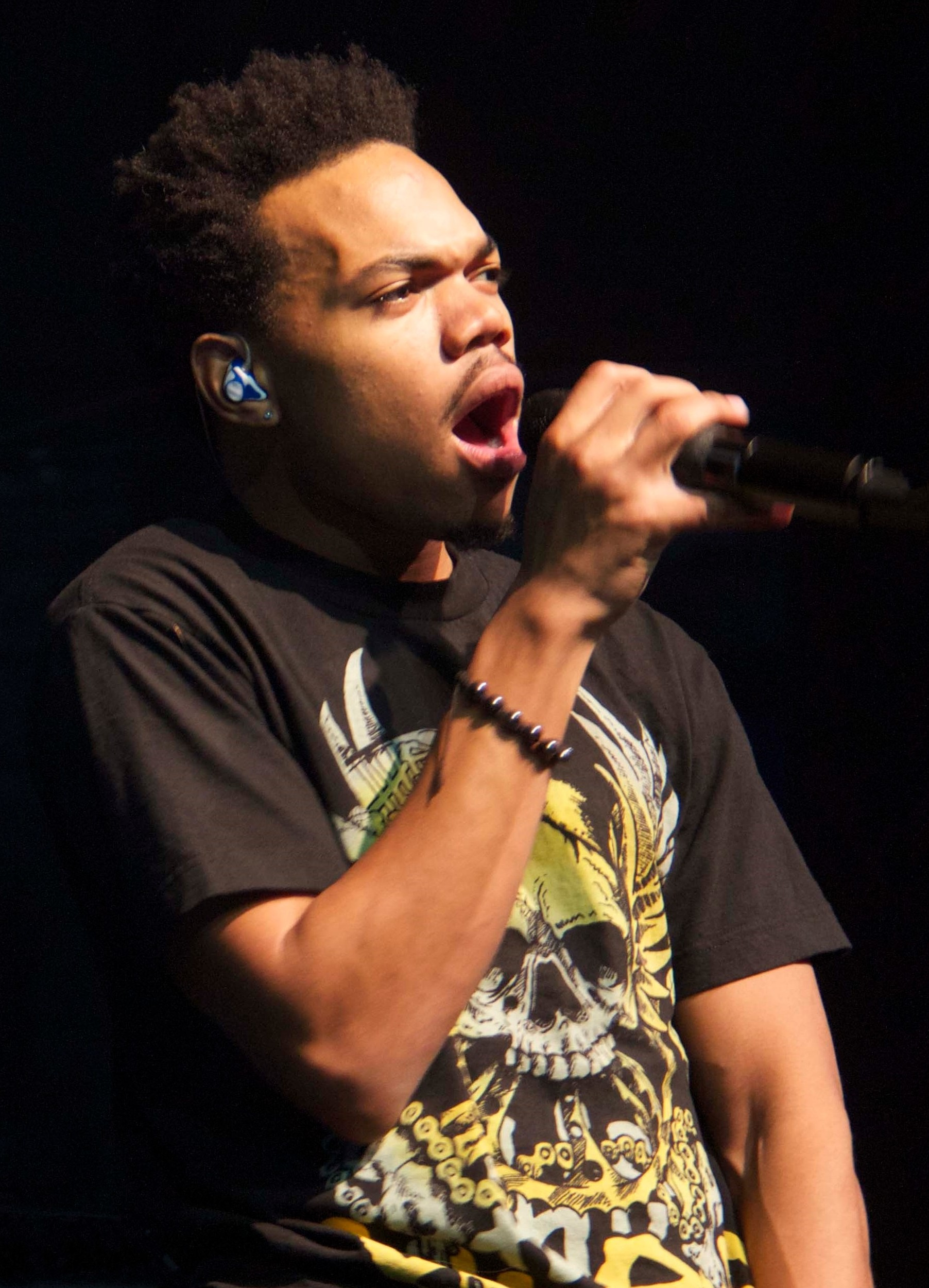
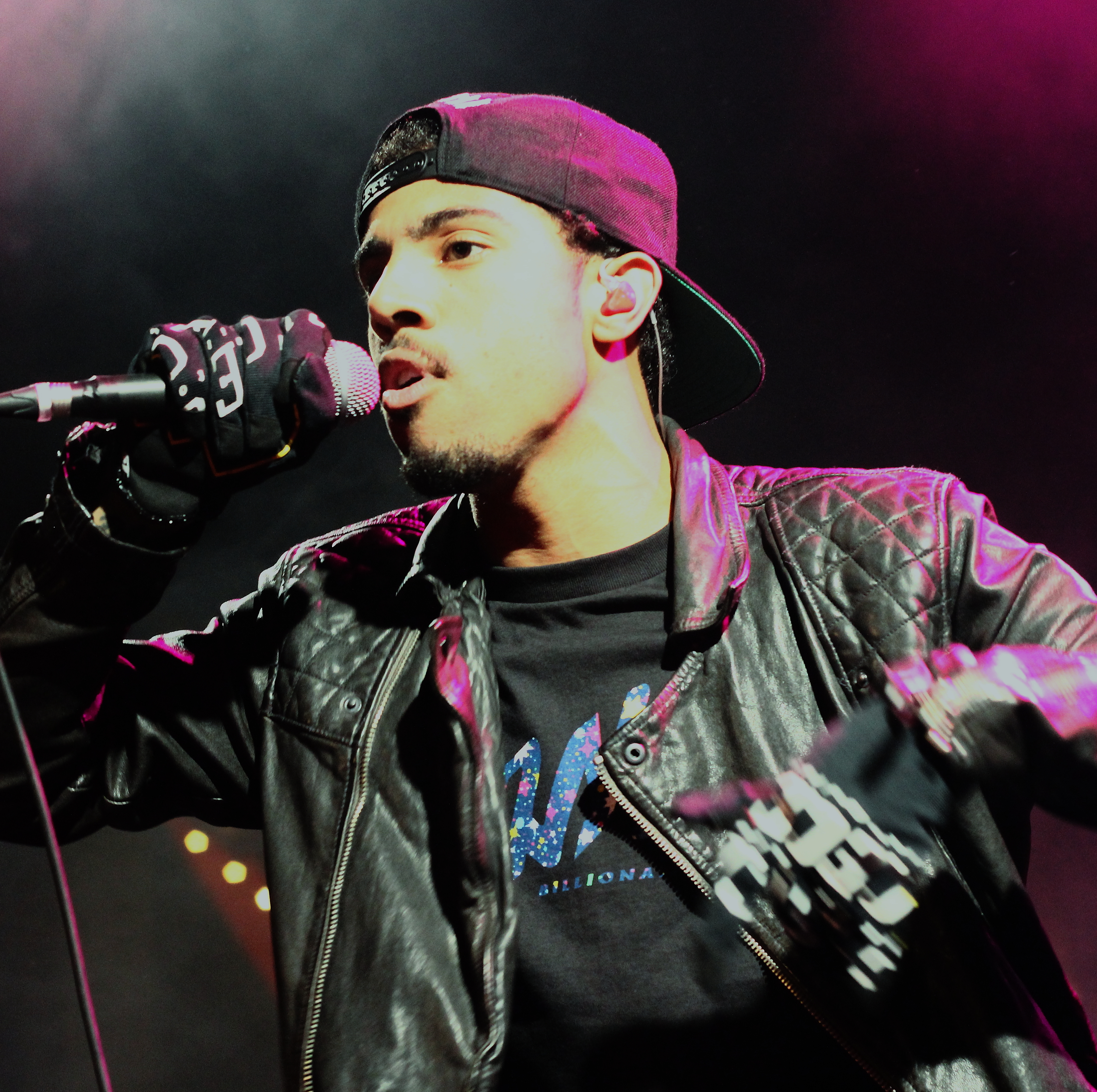
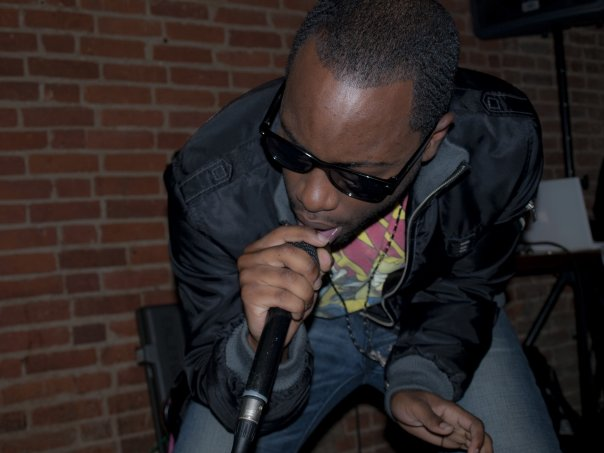
XXL selected Chance The Rapper, Vic Mensa and Jon Connor, among others, to their annual freshman class.
- On May 1, it was reported Dominican hip hop recording artist Monkey Black, real name Leonardo Ozuna, was fatally stabbed outside a bar in Barcelona, while he was residing in Spain.
- On May 5, XXL revealed their annual freshman class to include Chance the Rapper, Isaiah Rashad, Ty Dolla $ign, Rich Homie Quan, Vic Mensa, August Alsina, Troy Ave, Kevin Gates, Lil Bibby, Jon Connor, Lil Durk and Jarren Benton. The list had previously been rappers only, but this opened it to two R&B artists, namely August Alsina and Ty$.
- On May 6, Tyga released the song "Chi-Raq to LA" with fellow California based rapper The Game where they diss rival rappers Lil Durk and 40 Glocc, respectively. The same day that Rich Homie Quan suffered two seizures and a head injury from a fall, during a music video shoot for his single "Walk Thru" in Atlanta and had to be rushed to the hospital.
- On May 13, Gucci Mane plead guilty to possession of a firearm by a convicted felon in connection with a case during September 2013. He was sentenced to three years and three months in prison. He is scheduled for a late 2016 release.
- On May 18, at the 2014 Billboard Music Awards, Eminem won the awards for Top Rap Artist and the Top Rap Album for his eighth studio album The Marshall Mathers LP 2. Macklemore & Ryan Lewis won Top Rap Song for "Can't Hold Us". Drake, Jay-Z, J. Cole and Pitbull were also nominated in various categories.
- On May 28, the sale of Dr. Dre and Jimmy Iovine's Beats Electronics to Apple Inc. was finalized. The deal for 3 billion dollars, earned Dr. Dre hundreds of millions of dollars, making him the richest rapper in the game.

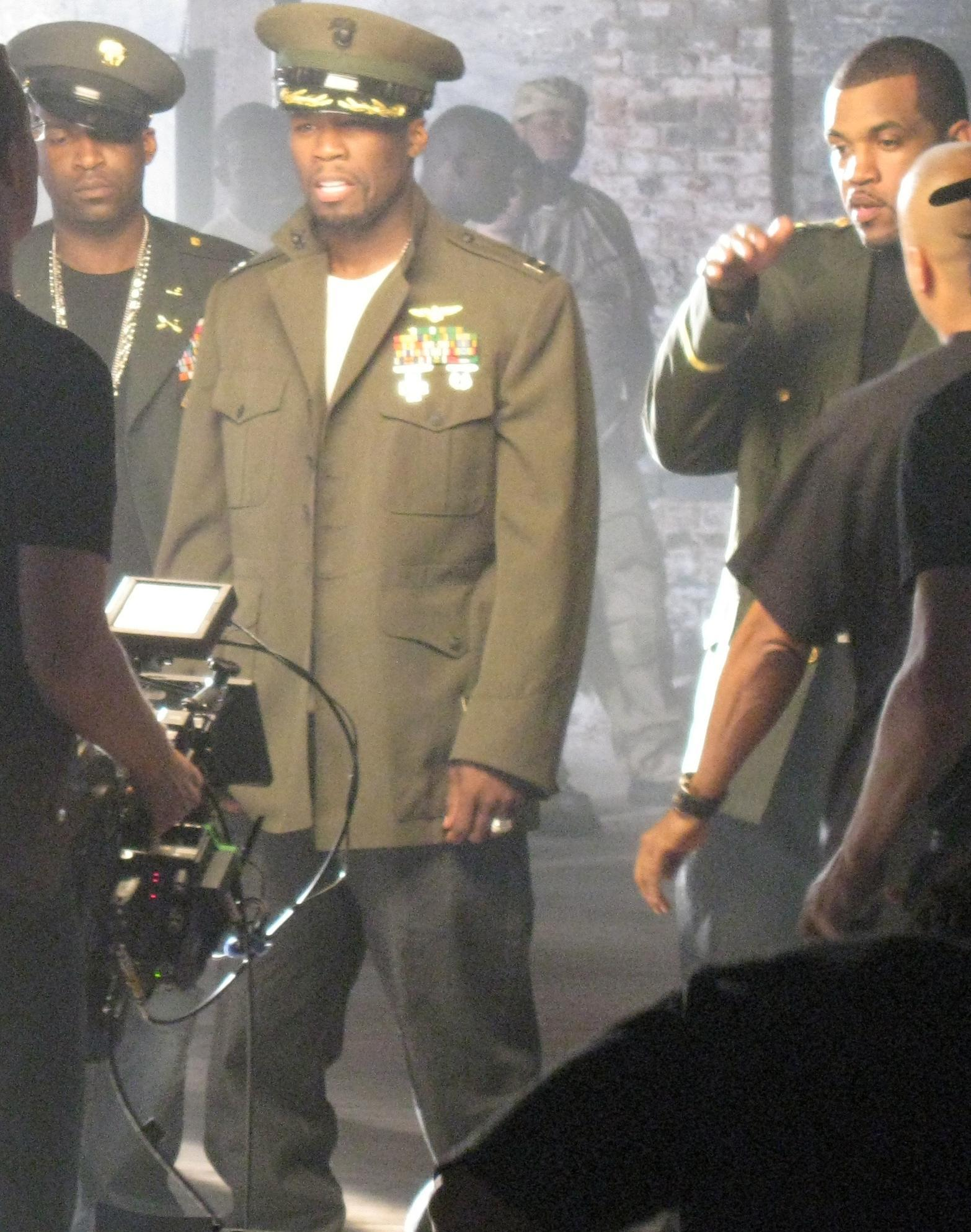
Hip hop group G-Unit, composed of 50 Cent, Lloyd Banks, Young Buck and Tony Yayo, officially reunited on June 1, 2014.

- On May 31, OTF NuNu, a member of Lil Durk's OTF crew, was shot and killed in Chicago. He was sitting in a parked SUV at the Chatham Village Square Mall on the city's South Side when the shooter walked up to the vehicle and fired several rounds at NuNu. He was struck multiple times and tried to escape the scene in the SUV before crashing into a nearby store.

=== June ===
- On June 1, 50 Cent, Nas, Nicki Minaj, Lil Wayne, Young Money, Wiz Khalifa, Trey Songz, DJ Mustard, YG, Ty Dolla Sign, Kid Ink, Sevyn Streeter, Bunji Garlin, Action Bronson, and Troy Ave performed on the main stage during 2014's Hot 97 Summer Jam. Most notably, the hip hop group G-Unit including 50 Cent, Lloyd Banks, Young Buck and Tony Yayo reunited.
- On June 6, JayAre of Cali Swag District died of sickle cell anemia.
- On June 9, in an interview with Bootleg Kev, B.o.B announced his new record label imprint, No Genre, named after his 2010 mixtape.
- On June 10, Eminem became the first recording artist to receive two Digital Single Diamond Awards from the RIAA. They were for his singles "Not Afraid" and "Love The Way You Lie" singles, which both surpassed the 10 million threshold for a combination of sales and streams.
- On June 18, a release date of August 14, 2015 was announced for the N.W.A biopic Straight Outta Compton.
- On June 29, at the BET Awards 2014, Drake won Best Male Hip-Hop Artist, Nicki Minaj won Best Female Hip-Hop Artist and Young Money won Best Group. The same day that Dizaster's conditional ban from King of the Dot.

=== July ===
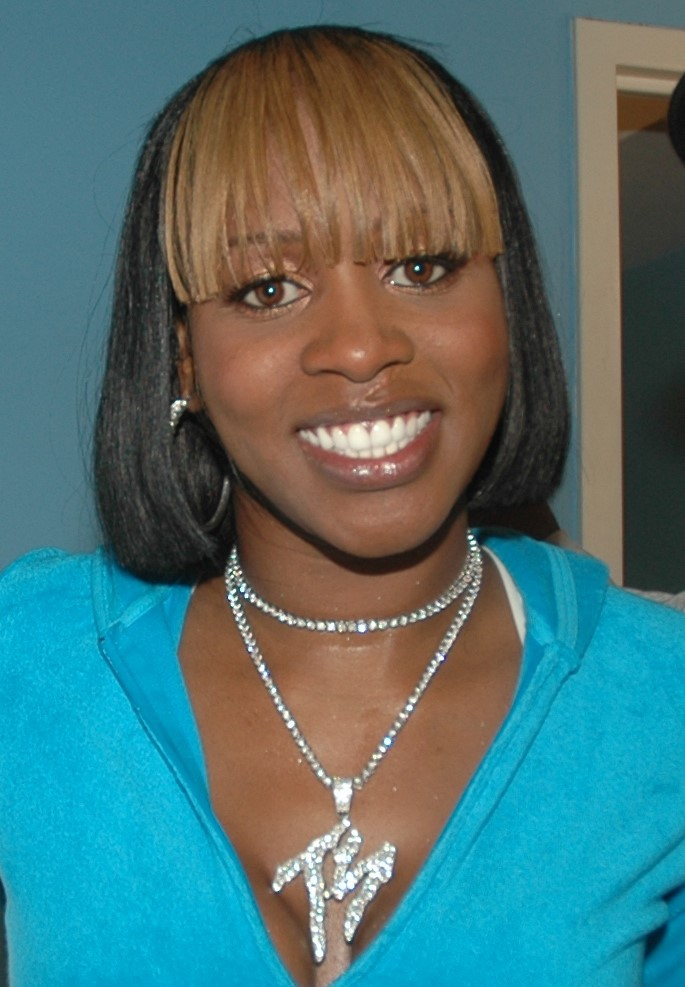
Remy Ma was released from prison on August 1

- On July 11, Eminem became the first rapper to headline London's Wembley Stadium, which can hold up to 90,000 people. Fellow Detroit-based rapper Danny Brown and alternative hip hop group Odd Future, led by Tyler, The Creator, served as Eminem's opening acts for the shows, respectively. The same day that Meek Mill was sentenced to three to six months in jail for probation violations.
- On July 23, Busta Rhymes announced his departure from Cash Money Records.

=== August ===
- On August 1, Remy Ma was released from prison after more than six years behind bars.
- On August 24, Suge Knight and two others were shot multiple times during a Chris Brown-hosted event at a West Hollywood nightclub. Knight was taken to an area hospital. The same day that Young Jeezy was arrested before performing at the Irvine, California stop on the Under The Influence Tour. This was in connection with the deadly shooting in the backstage area, two days prior on another stop of the tour in Mountain View, California. When the police raided his tour bus, they found an assault rifle assumed to belong to Jeezy as well guns on several members of his entourage. His bail was set at one million dollars.

=== October ===
- On October 28, Juvenile re-signed with Cash Money Records.

=== November ===
- On November 4, two members of Freddie Gibbs' entourage were shot multiple times in Brooklyn after a performance at Rough Trade in Williamsburg, NY, both men were taken to the hospital with non-life-threatening injuries.

=== December ===
- On December 2, Meek Mill was released from prison after serving nearly four months for probation violation.
- On December 16, Bobby Shmurda was arrested for alleged involvement in multiple shootings and drug trafficking in New York.

== Released albums ==
Release Date	Artist(s)	Album	Record label(s)	Notes
January 2	Baracuda & Modulok	Hydra	Fishgang, Takaba	
January 2	Sarkodie	Sarkology	Duncwills Entertainment	Nominated for World's Best Album at the 2014 World Music Awards; Singles: "Illuminati", "Down on One", "Preach", etc.
January 7	Kid Ink	My Own Lane	Tha Alumni Music Group, 88 Classic, RCA Records	Debuted at No. 3 on the Billboard 200; Singles: "Show Me", "Iz U Down", "Main Chick"
January 9	Burgundy Fats (Self Jupiter)	The Legend of 1900	Voila Entertainment, AugustBouy Music, Sleepy Hollow Records	
January 9	Úlfur Kolka	Borgaraleg Óhlýðni	Vesturbær	
January 14	Zion I	The Masters of Ceremony	Live Up Records	
January 21	The Nope (Moka Only & Psy)	Sinus EP	URBNET	
January 21	Step Brothers (The Alchemist & Evidence)	Lord Steppington	Rhymesayers Entertainment	Debuted at No. 60 on the Billboard 200; Singles: "Step Masters", "Mums In The Garage"
January 21	Transit	Super Man Took Steroids	Transit	
January 21	Trae tha Truth & The Worlds Freshest	The Tonite Show	Empire Distribution, Fresh in the Flesh	
January 21	Ty Dolla Sign	Beach House EP	Taylor Gang Records, Atlantic Records	Debuted at No. 51 on the Billboard 200; Singles: "Paranoid", "Or Nah", and "Paranoid (Remix)"
January 28	Isaiah Rashad	Cilvia Demo	Top Dawg Entertainment	Debuted at No. 40 on the Billboard 200
January 28	Qwazaar & Batsauce	Stress Chasers	Galapagos4	
January 28	Andy Mineo	Never Land	Reach Records	Debuted at No. 13 on the Billboard 200
January 31	Noah23 & Horse Head	Delicate Genius	Plague Language	
February 4	Lil Wyte & Frayser Boy	B.A.R. (Bay Area Representatives)	Hypnotize Minds, Wyte Music, Select-O-Hits	
February 4	Prince Po & Oh No	Animal Serum	Wandering Worx	
February 4	Young Fathers	Dead	Anticon, Big Dada	
February 11	Bike for Three!	So Much Forever	Fake Four Inc.	
February 11	Good Belt Gang	Resource Room	Militainment Business	
February 11	Willie the Kid & Bronze Nazareth	The Living Daylights	Embassy Ent., Black Day In July Productions	
February 18	The Doppelgangaz	Peace Kehd	Groggy Pack Entertainment	Singles: "Holla Holla x2", "KnowntchooTahLie"
February 18	The Grouch & Eligh	The Tortoise and the Crow	The Grouch & Eligh Music	Triple album; features one disc by The Grouch & Eligh, entitled 333, one disc by The Grouch, entitled Lighthouses, and one disc by Eligh, entitled Nomads.
February 18	Prodigy	The Most Infamous	Infamous Records	
February 18	Juvenile	The Fundamentals	Rap-A-Lot Records	
February 18	Verbal Kent	Sound of the Weapon	Mello Music Group	
February 23	Noah23	Rare Gems	Plague Language	
February 25	Kid Cudi	Satellite Flight: The Journey to Mother Moon	Wicked Awesome Records, Republic Records	Debuted at No. 4 on the Billboard 200
February 25	Homeboy Sandman	White Sands	Stones Throw Records	
February 25	Schoolboy Q	Oxymoron	Top Dawg Entertainment, Interscope Records	Debuted at No. 1 on the Billboard 200; Singles: "Yay Yay", "Collard Greens", "Man of the Year", "Break the Bank", "Studio"
February 25	Stat Quo	ATLA: All This Life Allows, Vol. 1	ATLA Music	
February 25	T. Mills	All I Wanna Do	Columbia Records	Debuted at No. 16 on the Billboard Top Rap Albums; Singles: "All I Wanna Do"
March 1	Calle 13	Multi Viral	El Abismo	Singles: "Multi_Viral", "El Aguante"
March 3	Chali 2na	Manphibian Music: Against the Current EP 2	Chali 2na	
March 3	Pharrell Williams	G I R L	Black Lot Music, Columbia Records	Debuted at No. 2 on the Billboard 200; Singles: "Happy", "Marilyn Monroe", "Come Get It Bae"; Certified Gold
March 3	Rick Ross	Mastermind	Maybach Music Group, Slip-n-Slide Records, Def Jam Recordings	Debuted at No. 1 on the Billboard 200; Singles: "The Devil Is a Lie", "War Ready", "Thug Cry"
March 4	Black Milk	Glitches in the Break	Computer Ugly Records	
March 4	Clyde Carson	Playboy	Moe Doe Entertainment	
March 4	O.S.T.R. & Marco Polo	Kartagina	Asfalt Records	Debuted at No. 1 on the Polish Charts; Certified Gold in Poland
March 4	Wax & Batsauce	The Soledad Brothers	Galapagos4	
March 11	Illmaculate	Clay Pigeons	Illmaculate	
March 11	Young Money	Rise of an Empire	Young Money Entertainment, Cash Money Records, Republic Records	Debuted at No. 7 on the Billboard 200; Singles: "We Alright", "Trophies", "Lookin Ass Nigga"
March 14	Farid Bang	Killa	Banger Musik	
March 17	Kevin Gates	By Any Means	Atlantic, Bread Winners' Association	
March 18	Ana Tijoux	Vengo	Nacional Records	
March 18	Cyne	All My Angles Are Right	Hometapes	
March 18	Freddie Gibbs & Madlib	Piñata	Madlib Invazion	Debuted at No. 39 on the Billboard 200; Singles: "Thuggin'", "Shame", "Deeper"
March 18	Nocando	Jimmy the Burnout	Hellfyre Club	
March 18	Onyx	Wakedafucup	Mad Money	Singles: "Wakedafucup"
March 18	Ra Scion	Sharper Tool; Bigger Weapon	SCIONtific Records	
March 18	Sisyphus	Sisyphus	Flaming Pop, Ryan Lott Music, New Jerusalem	
March 18	YG	My Krazy Life	Pu$haz Ink, CTE World, Def Jam Recordings	Debuted at No. 2 on the Billboard 200; Singles: "My Nigga", "Left, Right", "Who Do You Love?"
March 20	Phyno	No Guts No Glory	Sputnet Records, Penthauze Music	Singles: "Ghost Mode", "Man of the Year (Obago)", "Parcel", "O Set"
March 25	Axe Murder Boyz	The Garcia Brothers	Canonize Productions, Psychopathic Records	
March 25	Christon Gray	School of Roses	Collision Records	Debuted at No. 44 on the Billboard 200
March 25	Grieves	Winter & the Wolves	Rhymesayers Entertainment	
March 25	Lil Debbie	California Sweetheart	Lil Debbie Records	
March 25	Sage the Gemini	Remember Me	Republic Records	Debuted at No. 47 on the Billboard 200; Singles: "Red Nose", "Gas Pedal", "College Drop", "Down on Your Luck"
March 26	Mestizo	Underlord	Machina Muerte	
March 27	The Cloaks (Awol One & Gel Roc)	The Cloaks	Abolano Records	
March 28	Jesse Jagz	Jagz Nation Vol. 2: Royal Niger Company	Jagz Nation	Singles: "The Search (Radio)"
April 1	Big Hutch	The Big Hit	West World Records, Big Shot Music Group	
April 1	CunninLynguists	Strange Journey Volume Three	Bad Taste Records	
April 1	Giovanni Marks	C.O.A.T.	Get Crev Laboratories	
April 1	Mobb Deep	The Infamous Mobb Deep	Infamous Records, RED Distribution	Debuted at No. 49 on the Billboard 200; Singles: "Taking You off Here", "Say Something"
April 1	Nick Cannon	White People Party Music	N'Credible Entertainment	Singles: "Me Sexy", "Dance Floor", "Looking for a Dream"
April 1	Smoke DZA	Dream. Zone. Achieve	R.F.C. Music Group	Debuted at No. 30 on the Top R&B/Hip Hop Albums; Singles: "Legends In the Making (Ashtray, Pt. 2)"
April 8	Chuck Inglish	Convertibles	Sounds Like Fun Records, Federal Prism Records	Debuted at No. 24 on the Top R&B/Hip Hop Albums; Singles: "Swervin'", "Came Thru/Easily", "Legs"
April 8	Ratking	So It Goes	HXC, XL	
April 11	Sole & DJ Pain 1	Warfare	Black Canyon Music	
April 15	Da' T.R.U.T.H.	Heartbeat	Mixed Bag Records	Debuted at No. 84 on the Billboard 200
April 15	Dizzy Wright	State of Mind	Funk Volume	Debuted at No. 54 on the Billboard 200; Singles: "Everywhere I Go"
April 15	Messy Marv, The Jacka & Blanco	One Hunnid	Guerrilla Entertainment	
April 15	Locksmith	A Thousand Cuts	Landmark Entertainment	
April 15	Pharoahe Monch	PTSD	W.A.R. Media, Duck Down Music Inc.	Debuted at No. 102 on the Billboard 200; Singles: "Damage", "Bad M.F."
April 15	Nas	Illmatic XX (Illmatic reissue)	Columbia Records	
April 15	Sleep & Maulskull	Oregon Failure	Sleep of Oldominion LLC	
April 15	Timbuktu	How Huge: The Legend of Howard Huge	Droppin' Science Productions	
April 17	Ceschi	Forgotten Forever	Cooler Than Cucumbers Records	Limited to 100 vinyl copies with exclusive handmade artwork for each copy.
April 18	Ten Typ Mes	Trzeba było zostać dresiarzem	Alkopoligamia.com	Debuted at No. 4 on the Polish Charts; Certified Gold in Poland
April 20	Lil Wyte	No Sick Days	Wyte Music, Hypnotize Minds	
April 20	N.O.R.E.	Noreaster	Militainment Business	
April 22	Asher Roth	RetroHash	Federal Prism Records, Pale Fire	Debuted at No. 45 on the Billboard 200; Singles: "Tangerine Girl", "Fast Life"
April 22	Army of the Pharaohs	In Death Reborn	Enemy Soil, Babygrande Records, Demigodz Records	Debuted at No. 63 on the Billboard 200
April 22	Blueprint	Respect the Architect	Weightless Recordings	
April 22	Daz Dillinger	Weed Money	Felder Entertainment Inc., D.P.G. Recordz	Singles: "What's Your Pleasure", "The Reason Why"
April 22	Future	Honest	A-1 Recordings, Freebandz, Epic Records	Debuted at No. 2 on the Billboard 200; Singles: "Karate Chop", "Honest", "Shit", "Move That Dope", "Covered N Money", "I Won"
April 22	Iggy Azalea	The New Classic	Island Records	Debuted at No. 3 on the Billboard 200; Singles: "Work", "Bounce", "Change Your Life", "Fancy", "Black Widow"
April 22	K Camp	In Due Time	Interscope Records	Debuted at No. 40 on the Top R&B/Hip Hop Albums; Singles: "Money Baby", "Cut Her Off", "Blessing", "Turn Up for a Check"
April 22	Shabaam Sahdeeq	Keepers of the Lost Art	Below System	
April 22	Termanology	Mas Goya	ST. Records	
April 22	Yukmouth	GAS (Grow and Sale)	Smoke-a-Lot Records	
April 22	Zion I	Libations	Live Up Records	
April 28	Aim	Drum Machines & VHS Dreams	ATIC Records	
April 28	Radioinactive	Hip-Hop Helmet	Flying Carpet Studios, Laitdbac	
April 29	Bas	Last Winter	Dreamville Records, Interscope Records	Debuted at No. 103 on the Billboard 200
April 29	Chuuwee	Cool World	Amalgam Digital	
April 29	Intuition & Equalibrum	Intuition & Equalibrum	Kinda Neat	
April 29	J-Live	Around the Sun	Mortier Music	
April 29	Propaganda	Crimson Cord	Humble Beast Records	Debuted at No. 55 on the Billboard 200
April 29	Rapper Big Pooh & Roc C	Trouble In the Neighborhood	New World Color	
April 29	Social Club	Misfits 2	Social Club	Debuted at No. 59 on the Billboard 200
April 29	Styles P	Phantom and the Ghost	Phantom Entertainment, New Music Cartel, Empire Distribution	Debuted at No. 74 on the Billboard 200; Singles: "Sour"
May 6	Atmosphere	Southsiders	Rhymesayers Entertainment	Debuted at No. 8 on the Billboard 200
May 6	Beckah Shae	Champion	Shae Shoc Records	
May 6	People Under the Stairs	12 Step Program	PL70 Records, PUTS Records	
May 6	Tech N9ne	Strangeulation	Strange Music	Debuted at No. 5 on the Billboard 200
May 9	Kollegah	King	Selfmade Records	Singles: "Alpha", "AKs im Wandschrank", "King", "Du bist Boss"; Debuted at No. 1 on the German, Austrian and Swiss album charts; Certified Platinum in Germany and Gold in Austria
May 9	The Worlds Freshest & Freddie Gibbs	The Tonite Show	Empire Recordings, Fresh in the Flesh	
May 13	Boondox	Abaddon	Psychopathic Records	
May 13	Iamsu!	Sincerely Yours	HBK Gang Records, Alternative Distribution Alliance	Debuted at No. 50 on the Billboard 200; Singles: "Only That Real", "I Love My Squad"
May 13	Moka Only	Sex Money Moka	Urbnet	
May 17	Tede	#kurt_rolson	Wielkie Joł	Debuted at No. 3 on the Polish Charts; Singles: "Feat.", "#john_rambo", "CMRT"
May 19	The Roots	...And Then You Shoot Your Cousin	Def Jam Recordings	Debuted at No. 11 on the Billboard 200; Singles: "When the People Cheer"
May 19	Blu	Good To Be Home	New World Color, Nature Sounds	
May 20	Deniro Farrar	Rebirth EP	Vice Records	
May 20	eMC	The Turning Point	Penalty Recordings	
May 27	Gangsta Boo & La Chat	Witch	Phixieous Entertainment	
May 27	Hit-Boy & HS87	We the Plug	Hits Since '87, Interscope Records	
May 27	Kool Keith	Demolition Crash	Junkadelic Music	
May 27	Meyhem Lauren & Buckwild	Silk Pyramids	Thrice Great	
May 27	MJG	Too Pimpin' 2.0	MJG Muzik	
May 27	Skyzoo & Torae	Barrel Brothers	First Generation Rich Inc, Internal Affairs Ent, Loyalty Digital Corp, Empire Recordings	
May 27	Tedashii	Below Paradise	Reach Records	Debuted at No. 17 on the Billboard 200
June 3	50 Cent	Animal Ambition	G-Unit Records, Caroline Records	Debuted at No. 4 on the Billboard 200; Singles: "Hold On", "Pilot", "Smoke", "Hustler", "Chase the Paper", "Everytime I Come Around", "Irregular Heartbeat", "Winners Circle", "Twisted"
June 3	Apathy	Connecticut Casual	Demigodz Records, Dirty Version Records	
June 3	Big Smo	Kuntry Livin'	Elektra Nashville, Warner Music Nashville	Debuted at No. 31 on the Billboard 200
June 3	Die Antwoord	Donker Mag	Zef Records	
June 3	Mcenroe	Burnt Orange	Peanuts & Corn Records	
June 3	Sage Francis	Copper Gone	Strange Famous Records	
June 8	Bones	Garbage	TeamSESH	
June 10	Body Count	Manslaughter	Sumerian Records	Debuted at No. 102 on the Billboard 200; Singles: "Talk Shit, Get Shot"
June 10	Canibus	Fait Accompli	RBC Records	Singles: "Historic"
June 10	Cisco Adler	Coastin'	Bananabeat Records	
June 10	clipping.	CLPPNG	Sub Pop	
June 10	HRSMN	Historic EP	RBC Records	
June 10	¡Mayday! & Murs	¡MursDay!	Strange Music	Debuted at No. 45 on the Billboard 200; Singles: "Tabletops"
June 10	Open Mike Eagle	Dark Comedy	Mello Music Group	
June 10	The Polish Ambassador	Pushing Through the Pavement	Jumpsuit Records	
June 10	Sole & DJ Pain 1	Death Drive	Black Canyon	
June 11	Ka	1200 B.C.	Iron Works	
June 13	DJ Vadim	Dubcatcher	BBE Music	
June 15	Shady Blaze & BLVCKHXVRT	Shady HXVRT	Green Ova Records	
June 17	Canibus	The Masterpiece Collection	Babygrande Records	
June 17	Cappadonna	Hook Off	Protect-Ya-Neck Records	
June 17	Dessa	Parts of Speech, Re-Edited	Doomtree Records	
June 17	Jeru the Damaja	The Hammer	Hedspinn Records	
June 17	Swollen Members	Brand New Day	Battle Axe Records	
June 23	G-Eazy	These Things Happen	BPG, RVG, RED Distribution	Debuted at No. 3 on the Billboard 200
June 24	Ab-Soul	These Days...	Top Dawg Entertainment	Debuted at No. 11 on the Billboard 200
June 24	Alias	Pitch Black Prism	Anticon	
June 24	Buckshot & P-Money	Backpack Travels	Dirty, Dawn Raid, Duck Down	
June 24	Bubba Sparxxx	Made On McCosh Mill Road	New South, E1 Entertainment	
June 24	Cashis	Euthanasia	Bogish Brand Entertainment	
June 24	Def3 & Factor Chandelier	Wildlif3	Ship Records, URBNET	
June 24	K.Flay	Life as a Dog	Bummer Picnic Records	
June 24	Riff Raff	Neon Icon	Mad Decent	Debuted at No. 22 on the Billboard 200; Singles: "How to Be the Man"
June 24	Z-Ro	The Crown	XMG	
June 30	Muneshine	In Transit	Scissor Records	
July 1	Cam'ron	1st of the Month Vol. 1	Killa Entertainment	
July 1	Sadistik	Ultraviolet	Fake Four Inc.	
July 3	Main Flow	The Cincinnati Kid	Dopeshit Records, Wannabattle Records	
July 4	Gucci Mane	Trap House 4	1017 Brick Squad Records, 101 Distribution	Debuted at No. 153 on the Billboard 200
July 7	Mike Stud	Closer	Electric Feel Music	Debuted at No. 13 on the Billboard 200
July 15	Cashis	Bogish Boy Vol. 1	Bogish Brand Entertainment	
July 15	Madlib	Rock Konducta Pt. 1	Madlib Invazion	
July 15	Madlib	Rock Konducta Pt. 2	Madlib Invazion	
July 15	Reks	Eyes Watching God	Brick Records	
July 17	Felix Brothers (Gucci Mane, Young Dolph & Peewee Longway)	Felix Brothers	1017 Brick Squad Records, 101 Distribution	
July 18	Cassper Nyovest	Tsholofelo	Family Tree, Kalawa Jazmee Records, Universal Music	Singles: "Gusheshe", "Doc Shebeleza", "Phumakim"
July 22	Common	Nobody's Smiling	ARTium Recordings, Def Jam Recordings	Debuted at No. 6 on the Billboard 200; Singles: "Kingdom", "Speak My Piece", "Diamonds"
July 22	Cormega	Mega Philosophy	Slimstyle Records	
July 23	Noah23 & David Klopek	Light Years		
July 29	Dark Lotus	The Mud, Water, Air & Blood	Psychopathic Records	Debuted at No. 43 on the Billboard 200
July 29	Gucci Mane	The Oddfather	1017 Brick Squad Records, 101 Distribution	
July 29	MarQ Spekt & Blockhead	JustPlayWithIt	HiPNOTT Records	
July 29	PartyNextDoor	PartyNextDoor Two	OVO Sound, Warner Bros. Records	Debuted at No. 15 on the Billboard 200
July 29	Planet Asia & TzariZM	Via Satellite	Doxside Music Group	
July 29	Shabazz Palaces	Lese Majesty	Sub Pop Records	
July 29	Sir Michael Rocks	Banco	6 Cell Phones	Debuted at No. 118 on the Billboard 200; Singles: "Memo"
August 1	Cam'ron	1st of the Month Vol. 2	Killa Entertainment	Singles: "So Bad"
August 1	Chuck D	The Black In Man	Spitdigital	
August 5	AmpLive	Headphone Concerto	Plug Research Music	
August 5	Armand Hammer (Billy Woods & Elucid)	Furtive Movements	Backwoodz Studioz	
August 5	Ces Cru	Codename: Ego Stripper	Strange Music	Debuted at No. 40 on the Billboard 200
August 5	Lil Debbie	California Sweetheart Pt. 2	Lil Debbie Records	
August 5	Swoope	Sinema	Collision Records	Debuted at No. 55 on the Billboard 200
August 8	Hilltop Hoods	Walking Under Stars	Golden Era Records	Debuted at No. 1 on the Australian album charts; Singles: "Won't Let You Down", "Pyramid Building", "Cosby Sweater"
August 12	Chuuwee	The Chuuwee Channel	NCR	
August 12	Dilated Peoples	Directors of Photography	Rhymesayers Entertainment	Debuted at No. 41 on the Billboard 200
August 12	The Underachievers	Cellar Door: Terminus Ut Exordium	Brainfeeder	Debuted at No. 86 on the Billboard 200
August 12	Twista	Dark Horse	Get Money Gang Entertainment, Caroline Records	Debuted at No. 40 on the Billboard 200; Singles: "Throwin' My Money", "It's Yours"
August 12	Watsky	All You Can Do	Steel Wool Media, Welk Music Group	Debuted at No. 33 on the Billboard 200
August 15	Gucci Mane	Gucci Vs Guwop	1017 Brick Squad Records, 101 Distribution	
August 18	Travis Scott	Days Before Rodeo	Grand Hustle Records	Debuted at No. 2, peaked at No. 1 on the Billboard 200; Singles: "Don't Play", "Mamacita"
August 19	Wiz Khalifa	Blacc Hollywood	Atlantic Records, Rostrum Records	Debuted at No. 1 on the Billboard 200; Singles: "We Dem Boyz", "KK", "You and Your Friends", "Stayin Out All Night", "Promises", "So High"
August 19	Slaine	The King of Everything Else	Suburban Noize Records	
August 19	Statik Selektah	What Goes Around	Showoff Records, Duck Down Music Inc.	
August 19	CALiENS	CALiENS	Caliens	Nominated for "Best Hip Hop Album" at the San Diego Music Award 2015
August 23	Noah23	Street Astrology		
August 25	G-Unit	The Beauty of Independence	G-Unit Records	Debuted at No. 17 on the Billboard 200
August 26	Cash Out	Let's Get It	Bases Loaded, E1 Music	Debuted at No. 43 on the Billboard 200; Singles: "She Twerkin", "Mexico", "She Wanna Ride"
August 26	DJ Mustard	10 Summers	Pu$haz Ink, Roc Nation, Republic Records	Debuted at No. 143 on the Billboard 200; Singles: "Down on Me"
August 26	Paranoid Castle	Welcome to Success	Side Road Records	
August 26	Souls of Mischief	There Is Only Now	Linear Labs	
September 1	Cam'ron	1st of the Month Vol. 3	Killa Entertainment	
September 1	Father	Young Hot Ebony	Awful Records	
September 2	Homeboy Sandman	Hallways	Stones Throw Records	
September 2	Jeezy	Seen It All: The Autobiography	Def Jam Recordings, CTE World	Debuted at No. 2 on the Billboard 200; Singles: "Me OK", "Seen It All"
September 2	The Killjoy Club	Reindeer Games	Psychopathic Records	
September 9	Busdriver	Perfect Hair	Big Dada	
September 9	Ed O.G.	After All These Years	5th & Union	
September 9	Jhené Aiko	Souled Out	ARTium Recordings, Def Jam Recordings	Debuted at No. 3 on the Billboard 200; Singles: "To Love & Die", "The Pressure"
September 9	Jim Jones	We Own the Night Pt. 2: Memoirs of a Hustler	Vampire Life, Empire Distribution	Singles: "Wit the Sh!t"
September 9	Lecrae	Anomaly	Reach Records	Debuted at No. 1 on the Billboard 200
September 9	P. Reign	Dear America EP	RCA Records	
September 9	Rittz	Next to Nothing	Strange Music	Debuted at No. 14 on the Billboard 200
September 9	Slimkid3 & DJ Nu-Mark	Slimkid3 & DJ Nu-Mark	Delicious Vinyl	
September 16	Chris Brown	X	RCA Records	Debuted at No. 2 on the Billboard 200; Singles: "Fine China", "Don't Think They Know", "Love More", "Loyal", "New Flame"
September 16	Diabolic	Fightin' Words	War Horse Records	
September 16	Freeway & The Jacka	Highway Robbery	Team Early Entertainment, The Artist Records	
September 16	Joell Ortiz	House Slippers	Penalty Entertainment	Debuted at No. 45 on the Billboard 200; Singles: "House Slippers", "Music Saved My Life"
September 16	Josh Baze	Colour Blind	Cartel Records	
September 22	Professor Green	Growing Up in Public	Virgin Records	Singles: "Lullaby"
September 23	Snootie Wild	Go Mode	Epic Records, CMG	
September 30	The Alchemist	Rapper's Best Friend 3: An Instrumental Series	ALC	
September 30	Buck 65	Neverlove	Buck 65	
September 30	Diamond D	The Diam Piece	Dymond Mine Records	
September 30	Madchild	Switched On	Battle Axe Records	
September 30	Saigon	G.S.N.T. 3: The Troubled Times of Brian Carenard	Squid Ink Squad	
October 1	Cam'ron	1st of the Month Vol. 4	Killa Entertainment	Singles: "Snapped"
October 3	Childish Gambino	Kauai	Glassnote Records	Debuted at No. 18 on the Billboard 200
October 7	Bishop Nehru & MF Doom	NehruvianDoom	Lex Records	
October 7	Flying Lotus	You're Dead!	Warp Records	Debuted at No. 19 on the Billboard 200
October 7	Pastor Troy	Welcome to the Rap Game	Madd Society Records	
October 7	Rapsody	Beauty and the Beast	Jamla Records, Culture Over Everything	
October 7	Vince Staples	Hell Can Wait	Def Jam Recordings, ARTium Records	
October 10	Shindy	FVCKB!TCHE$GETMONE¥	Sony Music, ersguterjunge, AMF Management	Debuted at No. 1 on the German, Austrian and Swiss album charts
October 14	DJ Quik	The Midnight Life	Mad Science Recordings, INgrooves Music Group	Debuted at No. 63 on the Billboard 200
October 14	The Game	Blood Moon: Year of the Wolf	Blood Money Entertainment, eOne Music	Debuted at No. 7 on the Billboard 200; Singles: "Bigger Than Me", "Or Nah"
October 14	Hoodie Allen	People Keep Talking	Hoodie Allen LLC.	Debuted at No. 8 on the Billboard 200
October 21	Army of the Pharaohs	Heavy Lies the Crown	Pazmanian Devil Music	
October 21	T.I.	Paperwork	Columbia Records, Grand Hustle Records	Debuted at No. 2 on the Billboard 200; Singles: "About the Money", "No Mediocre", "New National Anthem"
October 21	Logic	Under Pressure	Def Jam Recordings, Visionary Music Group	Debuted at No. 4 on the Billboard 200; Singles: "Under Pressure", "Buried Alive"
October 24	Run the Jewels	Run the Jewels 2	Mass Appeal, Sony RED	Debuted at No. 96, peaked at No. 50 on the Billboard 200; Singles: "Blockbuster Night, Pt. 1", "Oh My Darling Don't Cry"
October 28	Apollo Brown & Ras Kass	Blasphemy	Mello Music Group	
October 28	Chris Webby	Chemically Imbalanced	Homegrown Music, E1 Music	Debuted at No. 25 on the Billboard 200
October 28	Stalley	Ohio	Maybach Music Group, Atlantic Records	Debuted at No. 35 on the Billboard 200; Singles: "Always Into Something", "Jackin' Chevys", "One More Shot"
October 28	Trip Lee	Rise	Reach Records	
October 28	Black Milk	If There's a Hell Below	Computer Ugly Records	
October 28	Jared Evan & Statik Selektah	Still Blue	Showoff Records, Jared Evan Inc.	
October 28	Young Chop	Still	ChopSquad	
October 28	Future	Monster	Epic Records, Freebandz	Debuted at No. 120 on the Billboard 200
October 30	M.I	The Chairman	Chocolate City	
November 1	Cam'ron	1st of the Month Vol. 5	Killa Entertainment	Singles: "Touch the Sky"
November 4	Joe Budden	Some Love Lost	Mood Muzik Entertainment, E1 Music	Debuted at No. 55 on the Billboard 200
November 4	Jackie Hill Perry	The Art of Joy	Humble Beast	
November 4	Teyana Taylor	VII	Def Jam Recordings, GOOD Music	Singles: "Maybe", "Business", "Do Not Disturb"
November 4	Theophilus London	Vibes	Warner Bros. Records	
November 4	Too Short	19,999: The EP	Dangerous Music, Empire Distribution	
November 5	The Lox	The Trinity 2nd Sermon	D-Block Records	
November 6	Azealia Banks	Broke with Expensive Taste	Azealia Banks, Prospect Park	Debuted at No. 30 on the Billboard 200; Singles: "Yung Rapunxel", "Heavy Metal and Reflective", "Chasing Time"
November 10	Big K.R.I.T.	Cadillactica	Def Jam Recordings, Cinematic Music Group	Debuted at No. 5 on the Billboard 200; Singles: "Pay Attention", "Cadillactica", "Soul Food"
November 10	Bobby Shmurda	Shmurda She Wrote	Epic Records	Debuted at No. 79 on the Billboard 200; Singles: "Hot Nigga", "Bobby Bitch"
November 10	Hail Mary Mallon	Bestiary	Rhymesayers Entertainment	Debuted at No. 96 on the Billboard 200
November 10	L.U.C	Reflekcje o miłości apdejtowanej selfie	Warner Music Poland	Debuted at No. 32 on the Polish Charts
November 13	Kerser	King	Kerser N Nebs Records	Debuted at No. 9 on the Australian album charts
November 14	Kool Savas	Märtyrer	Essah Entertainment	Debuted at No. 1 on the German and Swiss album charts
November 18	Havoc	13 Reloaded	Hclass Entertainment	
November 18	M.O.P.	Street Certified	Nature Sounds	
November 18	SD	Truly Blessed	Truly Blessed, iHipHop Distribution	
November 24	Maino	K.O.B. 2	Hustle Hard, Stage One	
November 24	Pitbull	Globalization	Mr. 305 Inc., RCA Records, Polo Grounds Music	Debuted at No. 18 on the Billboard 200; Singles: "Wild Wild Love", "Fireball", "Time of Our Lives", "Fun"
November 24	Prodigy & Boogz Boogetz	Young Rollin Stonerz	Infamous Records	
November 24	Rick Ross	Hood Billionaire	Maybach Music Group, Def Jam Recordings	Debuted at No. 6 on the Billboard 200; Singles: "Elvis Presley Blvd.", "Keep Doin' That (Rich Bitch)", "Nickel Rock"
November 24	Shady Records	Shady XV	Shady Records, Interscope Records	Debuted at No. 3 on the Billboard 200; Singles: "Guts Over Fear", "Y'all Ready Know", "Detroit vs. Everybody"
November 25	Insane Clown Posse	House of Wax	Psychopathic Records	
November 25	Your Old Droog	Your Old Droog	Droog Recordings	
December 1	Cam'ron	1st of the Month Vol. 6	Killa Entertainment	
December 1	Red Café	In Us We Trust: The Compilation	Shakedown Entertainment	
December 2	Astro	Computer Era	Grade A Tribe Records	Singles: "Champion"
December 2	Paul Wall	The Po-Up Poet	Paul Wall Music	
December 2	Trademark Da Skydiver	Return of the Super Villain	iHipHop Distribution	
December 2	Wu-Tang Clan	A Better Tomorrow	Warner Bros. Records	Debuted at No. 29 on the Billboard 200; Singles: "Keep Watch", "Ron O'Neal", "Ruckus In B Minor"
December 5	OJ da Juiceman	The Otis Williams Jr. Story	32 Entertainment	
December 9	E-40	Sharp On All 4 Corners: Corner 1	Heavy on the Grind Entertainment	Debuted at No. 61 on the Billboard 200; Singles: "Red Cup", "Choices (Yup)"
December 9	E-40	Sharp On All 4 Corners: Corner 2	Heavy on the Grind Entertainment	Debuted at No. 197 on the Billboard 200
December 9	Ghostface Killah	36 Seasons	Tommy Boy Records	Debuted at No. 94 on the Billboard 200
December 9	J. Cole	2014 Forest Hills Drive	Dreamville Records, Roc Nation, Columbia Records	Debuted at No. 1 on the Billboard 200; Singles: "Apparently", "Wet Dreamz", "No Role Modelz"; Certified Platinum
December 9	Royce da 5'9" & DJ Premier	PRhyme	PRhyme Records	Debuted at No. 59 on the Billboard 200; Singles: "Courtesy"
December 9	Termanology	Shut Up and Rap	Brick Records	
December 10	Yukmouth, Chino Chino and P. Hustle	The Cream Team	Da Hustle Ent., Rapbay, Urbanlife Distribution	
December 15	Nicki Minaj	The Pinkprint	Young Money Entertainment, Cash Money Records, Republic Records	Debuted at No. 2 on the Billboard 200; Singles: "Pills n Potions", "Anaconda", "Only", "Bed of Lies", "Truffle Butter", "The Night Is Still Young"; Certified Gold
December 15	YG	Blame It on the Streets	Pu$haz Ink, CTE World, Def Jam Recordings	Debuted at No. 118 on the Billboard 200
December 16	Crooked I	Sex, Money & Hip-Hop	Treacherous C.O.B., SMH Records	
December 16	Chief Keef	Nobody	12hunna	
December 16	JR & PH7 x Chuuwee	Meanwhile off Mack	Below System Records	
December 16	Ludacris	Burning Bridges	Def Jam Recordings	
December 25	Fabolous	The Young OG Project	Desert Storm Records, Def Jam Recordings	Debuted at No. 12 on the Billboard 200
December 25	Militainment	N.O.R.E. Presents: DRINKS	Militainment Business	
December 31	Skillz & Bink	Made in Virginia	Big Kidz Entertainment	

== Highest-charting songs ==
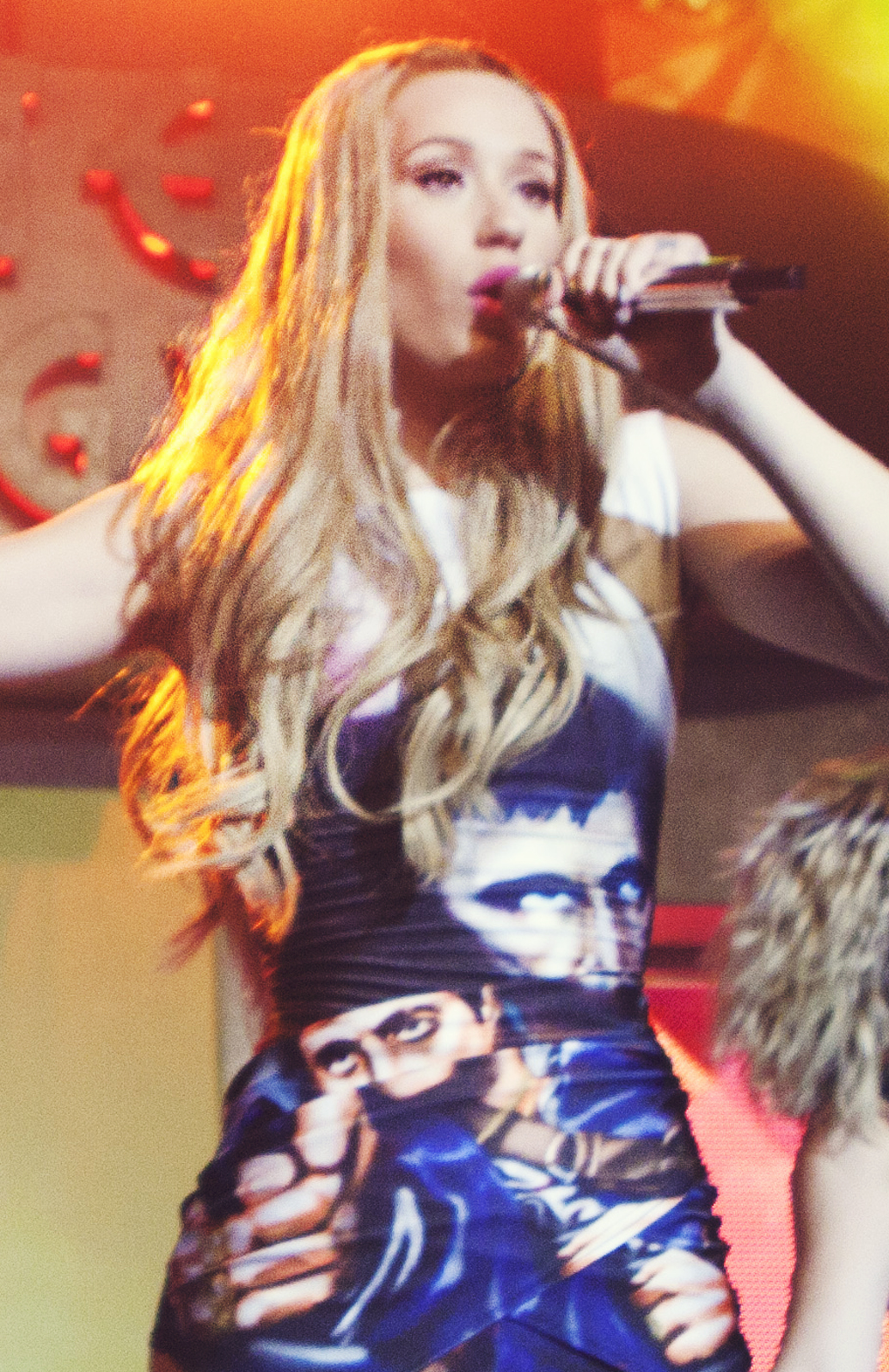
Iggy Azalea appeared on "Fancy", "Black Widow" and "No Mediocre", three international hit singles during 2014.

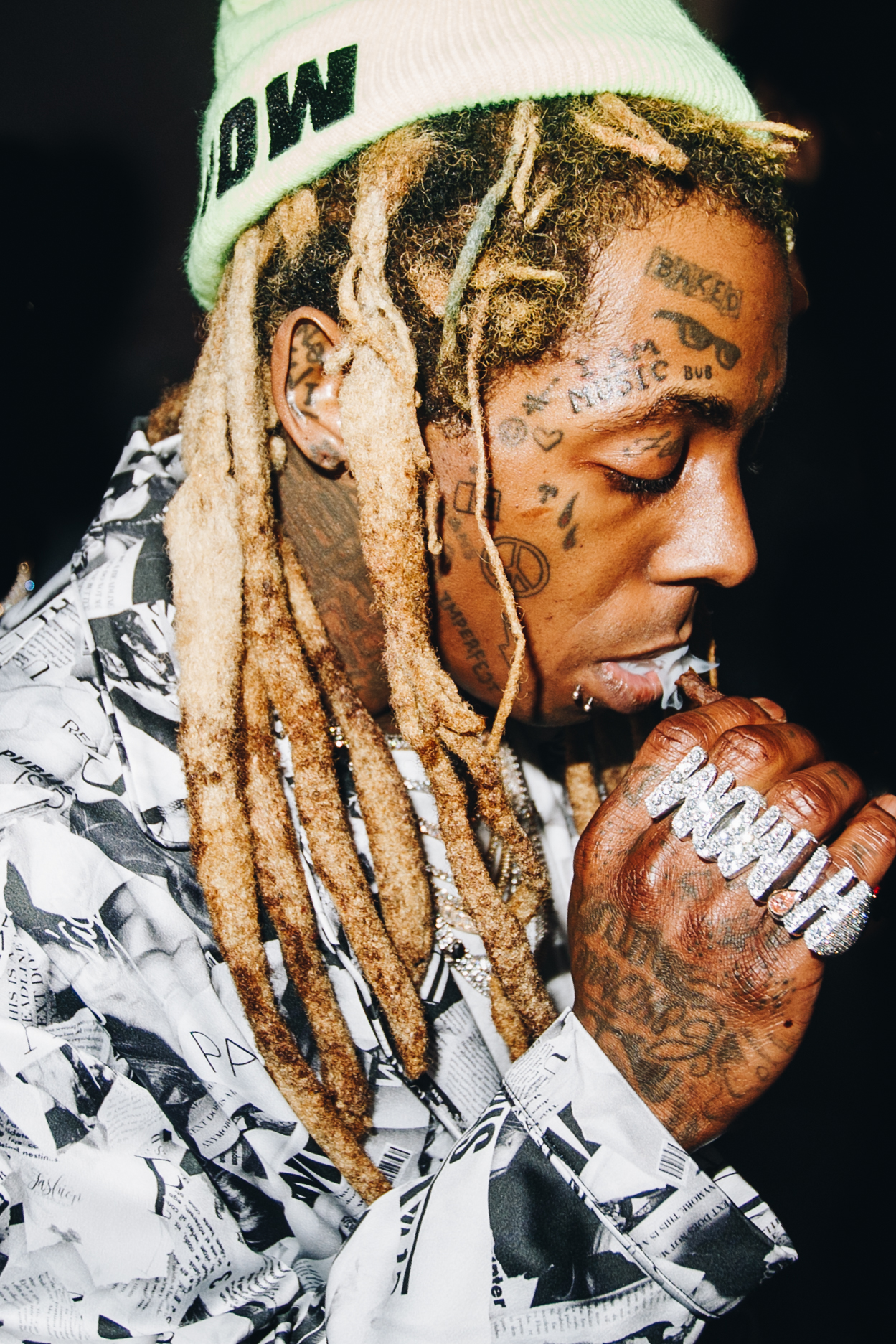
Lil Wayne participated on three hit singles during 2014, his song "Believe Me", Chris Brown's "Loyal", and "Thank You" by Busta Rhymes.

Hip hop singles which peaked in the Top 40 of the main single chart in a major market.
Country	Title	Artist(s)	Peak position
NZ/US/CA	"Fancy"	Iggy Azalea featuring Charli XCX	1
GER	"Traum"	Cro	1
UK	"Feelin' Myself"	will.i.am featuring Miley Cyrus, French Montana, Wiz Khalifa and DJ Mustard	2
US	"Anaconda"	Nicki Minaj	2
US	"Black Widow"	Iggy Azalea featuring Rita Ora	3
US	"Turn Down for What"	DJ Snake and Lil Jon	4
UK	"Wild Wild Love"	Pitbull featuring G.R.L.	6
US	"Hot Nigga"	Bobby Shmurda	6
US	"Don't Tell 'Em"	Jeremih featuring YG	6
UK	"How I Feel"	Flo Rida	8
US	"Loyal"	Chris Brown featuring Lil Wayne and French Montana, Too Short or Tyga	9
GER	"King"	Kollegah	10
US	"I Don't Fuck with You"	Big Sean featuring E-40	11
US	"Only"	Nicki Minaj featuring Drake, Lil Wayne & Chris Brown	12
US	"Tuesday"	ILOVEMAKKONEN featuring Drake	12
UK	"Thank You"	Busta Rhymes featuring Q-Tip, Lil Wayne, and Ye	13
US	"Show Me"	Kid Ink featuring Chris Brown	13
GER	"Alpha"	Kollegah	15
US	"Lifestyle"	Rich Gang featuring Young Thug & Rich Homie Quan	16
US	"No Type"	Rae Sremmurd	16
US	"My Nigga"	YG featuring Rich Homie Quan and Jeezy	19
AUS	"Tightrope"	Illy	19
UK	"Na Na"	Trey Songz	20
UK	"The Drop"	Lethal Bizzle and Cherri Voncelle	20
AUS	"Headlights"	Eminem featuring Nate Ruess	21
GER	"AKs Im Wandschrank"	Kollegah	21
US	"Guts Over Fear"	Eminem featuring Sia	22
US	"Pills N Potions"	Nicki Minaj	24
US	"2 On"	Tinashe featuring ScHoolboy Q	24
US	"Believe Me"	Lil Wayne featuring Drake	26
US	"Hangover"	PSY featuring Snoop Dogg	26
US	"Paranoid"	Ty Dolla Sign featuring B.o.B	29
US	"No Mediocre"	T.I. featuring Iggy Azalea	33
US	"0 to 100 / The Catch Up"	Drake	35
US	"No Flex Zone"	Rae Sremmurd	36
US	"Studio"	Schoolboy Q featuring BJ the Chicago Kid	38
US	"I"	Kendrick Lamar	39
US	"Hold You Down"	DJ Khaled featuring Chris Brown, August Alsina, Future & Jeremih	39

== Highest first-week sales ==
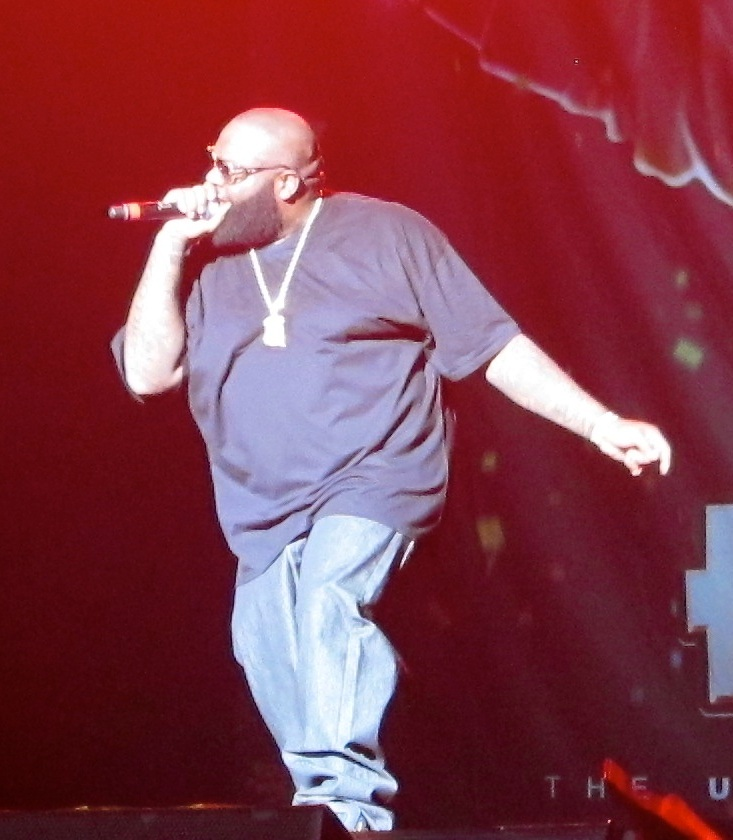
Rick Ross' sixth studio album Mastermind sold 179,000 copies in the United States during its first week of sale.

List of top ten albums with the highest first-week home market sales, as of December 24, 2014
Number	Album	Artist	1st-week sales	1st-week position	Refs
1	2014 Forest Hills Drive	J. Cole	375,000‡	1	
2	The Pinkprint	Nicki Minaj	244,000‡	2	
3	Mastermind	Rick Ross	179,000	1	
4	King	Kollegah	160,000	1	
5	Oxymoron	Schoolboy Q	139,000	1	
6	Shady XV	Shady Records	138,000	3	
7	Seen It All: The Autobiography	Young Jeezy	121,000	2	
8	G I R L	Pharrell	113,000	2	
9	Blacc Hollywood	Wiz Khalifa	90,000	1	
10	Anomaly	Lecrae	89,000	1	

‡ By the time 2014 Forest Hills Drive and The Pinkprint were released, Billboard had started counting total consumption (sales + streaming + track equivalent units) for the Billboard 200 chart. In pure album sales, 2014 Forest Hills Drive debuted with 354,000 copies, while The Pinkprint debuted with 198,000.

== Highest critically reviewed albums ==
=== Metacritic ===
Number	Artist	Album	Average score	Number of reviews	Reference
1	Run the Jewels	Run the Jewels 2	89	35 reviews	
2	Big K.R.I.T.	Cadillactica	88	11 reviews	
3	Royce da 5'9" & DJ Premier	PRhyme	84	5 reviews	
4	Souls of Mischief	There Is Only Now	84	5 reviews	
5	Statik Selektah	What Goes Around	84	4 reviews	
6	Young Fathers	Dead	83	13 reviews	
7	Freddie Gibbs & Madlib	Piñata	82	19 reviews	
8	Isaiah Rashad	Cilvia Demo	82	13 reviews	
9	Shabazz Palaces	Lese Majesty	81	36 reviews	
10	Future	Honest	80	21 reviews	
11	YG	My Krazy Life	80	16 reviews	
12	Step Brothers	Lord Steppington	79	11 reviews	
13	Homeboy Sandman	Hallways	79	5 reviews	
14	Stalley	Ohio	79	5 reviews	
15	Schoolboy Q	Oxymoron	78	30 reviews	
16	Common	Nobody's Smiling	78	21 reviews	
17	Ratking	So It Goes	78	19 reviews	
18	Pharaohe Monch	PTSD	78	9 reviews	
19	Cities Aviv	Come To Life	78	6 reviews	
20	Azealia Banks	Broke With Expensive Taste	77	26 reviews	
21	Kevin Gates	By Any Means	77	6 reviews	
22	The Underachievers	Cellar Door: Terminus ut Exordium	76	7 reviews	
23	Dilated Peoples	Directors of Photography	75	6 reviews	
24	Busdriver	Perfect Hair	74	10 reviews	
25	Mustard	10 Summers	74	7 reviews	
26	Clipping.	CLPPNG	73	14 reviews	
27	Open Mike Eagle	Dark Comedy	73	7 reviews	
28	Blu	Good To Be Home	73	4 reviews	
29	Ghostface Killah	36 Seasons	72	18 reviews	
30	Logic	Under Pressure	72	8 reviews	
31	Theophilus London	Vibes	72	7 reviews	
32	The Roots	...And Then You Shoot Your Cousin	70	26 reviews	
33	Nicki Minaj	The Pinkprint	70	25 reviews	
34	Ab-Soul	These Days...	70	17 reviews	
35	Jeezy	Seen It All: The Autobiography	70	14 reviews	
36	Atmosphere	Southsiders	70	9 reviews	
37	Mobb Deep	The Infamous Mobb Deep	70	7 reviews	
38	T.I.	Paperwork	69	11 reviews	
39	Sage The Gemini	Remember Me	69	10 reviews	
40	Rick Ross	Mastermind	68	23 reviews	
41	Chuck Inglish	Convertibles	68	10 reviews	
42	J. Cole	2014 Forest Hills Drive	67	17 reviews	
43	NehruvianDoom	NehruvianDoom	67	13 reviews	
44	Sage Francis	Copper Gone	64	7 reviews	
45	Smoke DZA	Dream.Zone.Achieve	63	4 reviews	
46	Asher Roth	RetroHash	63	4 reviews	
47	RiFF RAFF	Neon Icon	61	14 reviews	
48	Wu-Tang Clan	A Better Tomorrow	60	24 reviews	
49	Kid Cudi	Satellite Flight: The Journey to Mother Moon	60	9 reviews	
50	Iamsu!	Sincerely Yours	59	5 reviews	
51	Grieves	Winter & the Wolves	58	4 reviews	
52	Iggy Azalea	The New Classic	56	26 reviews	
53	Wiz Khalifa	Blacc Hollywood	54	16 reviews	
54	Rick Ross	Hood Billionaire	54	12 reviews	
55	50 Cent	Animal Ambition	53	16 reviews	

=== AnyDecentMusic? ===
Number	Artist	Album	Average score	Number of reviews	Reference
1	Run the Jewels	Run the Jewels 2	8.4	30 reviews	
2	Shabazz Palaces	Lese Majesty	7.9	30 reviews	
3	Freddie Gibbs & Madlib	Piñata	7.7	15 reviews	
4	Big K.R.I.T.	Cadillactica	7.5	6 reviews	
5	Future	Honest	7.4	15 reviews	

== See also ==
- Previous article: 2013 in hip-hop
- Next article: 2015 in hip-hop
- List of Billboard number-one rap albums of 2014
