= Real and True =

2013 single by Future and Miley Cyrus featuring Mr Hudson

Single by Future and Miley Cyrus featuring Mr Hudson
- Released: November 5, 2013
- Genre: Pop; R&B
- Length: 4:07
- Label: Epic; Freebandz; A1
- Songwriters: Nayvadius Wilburn; Miley Cyrus; Benjamin Hudson McIldowie
- Producer: Mike Will Made It

Future singles chronology
"Shit" (2013)	"Real and True" (2013)	"Move That Dope" (2014)

Miley Cyrus singles chronology
"23" (2013)	"Real and True" (2013)	"Feelin' Myself" (2013)

Mr Hudson singles chronology
"Fred Astaire" (2013)	"Real and True" (2013)	"Move" (2013)

Music video
- "Real and True" on YouTube

"Real and True" is a song written and performed by American rapper Future and American singer Miley Cyrus featuring English singer Mr Hudson. It was released as a single on November 5, 2013, by A1 Records, Freebandz, and Epic Records. Produced by the artists' frequent collaborator Mike Will Made It, the song is a pop and R&B track, the lyrics of which describe an everlasting love.

"Real and True" received generally favorable reviews from music critics, who complimented its overall production and lyrical content, but felt that the vocals were over-processed. Its accompanying music video premiered on November 10, 2013, preceding the rebroadcast of the 2013 MTV Europe Music Awards in the United States.

== Background and composition ==
"Miley heard the hook and instantly fell in love with the song. She did her vocals and they sent it back to me and I wrote my verses to that and tried to come up with something unique. Her vocals are very strong and emotional on the song. She brings that passion to this record. Miley is really cool and down-to-earth; she's always fun to be around and I'm always cracking up when I'm on set with her."

— Future discusses working with Cyrus during an interview with Rolling Stone.

Future and Cyrus had first collaborated on the track "My Darlin'" for Cyrus' fourth studio album Bangerz (2013). The lyrics of "My Darlin'" concern the angst following a failed relationship and the simultaneous desire to reconcile. Later, Cyrus expressed interest in "Real and True", recording her vocals for the chorus. Mr Hudson also recorded vocals for the chorus, which were incorporated with Cyrus' singing. Future wrote the remaining verses to complement the contributions of Cyrus and Mr Hudson, though the two received credits for being co-writers. The track was released on November 5, 2013. Future raps the first verse, which is in third-person perspective, Cyrus raps the second verse and Future raps the third verse. Mr Hudson sings the chorus (except the second time, where it is sung by Cyrus) and Cyrus and Future join Mr Hudson on the chorus the fourth and fifth time. The song had originally leaked with an extra verse from Future, but it was cut from the final version.

"Real and True" is a pop and R&B song, the lyrics of which describe an everlasting love. During the chorus, Cyrus and Mr. Hudson sing the lyrics "When the sun dies and the stars fade from view / Our love will remain real and true / Through the distance and cold depths of space / The radio sings our song / It's a love real and true". Carolyn Menyes from MusicTimes noted that the artists' vocals heavily relied on Auto-Tune technology, which she credited with providing a "cohesive sound throughout the track". Future suggested that "Real and True" was lyrically inspired by his fiancée, American recording artist Ciara, commenting "it might surprise people what I'm saying 'cause I'm speaking on my relationship and everything I'm going through right now and trying to capture that moment." "Real and True" was produced by Mike Will Made It, who frequently collaborates with Cyrus and Future.

The song is performed in the key of B major with a tempo of 70 beats per minute in common time.

== Critical reception ==
"Real and True" received generally favorable reviews from music critics, who complimented its overall production and lyrical content, but felt that the vocals were over-processed. Erika Ramirez from Billboard felt that "Cyrus steals the spotlight with her vocal prowess" during her verse of the track, while Alex Young of Consequence of Sound commended the recording as a "feel good love song highlighted by an impressive hook", adding that Future delivered a "delicate mix of rap and sensual croons". Writing for Exclaim!, Josiah Hughes enjoyed the "general feeling of love and goodness" present throughout the song. Carl Williott from Idolator complimented Mike Will Made its production contributions, and called the track "pretty". Carolyn Menyes of MusicTimes commented that the track "gets its point across and is tender" despite "under-utilizing" Cyrus' vocals.

== Chart performance ==
"Real and True" debuted on the South Korean Circle Download Chart for foreign songs only at number 189 during the week of November 3 to 9, 2013. In the United States, the song peaked at number three on the Bubbling Under Hot 100 chart.

== Music video ==
"We went into space and it's about somebody sacrificing their life for love. This video is probably one of the most special videos to me."

— Future describes the concept of the music video for "Real and True".

An accompanying music video for "Real and True" premiered on November 10, 2013, preceding the rebroadcast of the 2013 MTV Europe Music Awards in the United States. The clip begins as astronauts Future and Mr Hudson discover the corpse of another astronaut, portrayed by Cyrus. After being revived on an operating table, Cyrus (covered in silver glitter) and Future are shown intimately singing their respective verses to one another. Interspersed throughout the video are scenes of Mr Hudson singing the chorus. As the clip finishes, Future and Mr Hudson are shown leaving the planet where they found Cyrus on their damaged rocket.

Referencing earlier pictures from the music video prior to its official release, Edwin Ortiz stated that its theme was a "space age love story", further opining that it shared a space-themed concept with Future's debut studio album Pluto (2012). Zoe Shenton from the Daily Mirror provided a favorable review for the music video, commenting "clothes or no clothes, [Cyrus] looks and sounds incredible". A writer for The Huffington Post thought that the "appropriately futuristic visuals" complemented the space-themed lyrics in the song.

== Charts ==
Chart performance for "Real and True"
Chart (2013)	Peak position
South Korea Foreign Download (Circle)	189
UK Singles (Official Charts)	92
UK Hip Hop/R&B (Official Charts)	17
US Bubbling Under Hot 100 (Billboard)	3
US Hot R&B/Hip-Hop Songs (Billboard)	32

== Release history ==
"Real and True" release history
Region	Date	Format	Labels	Ref.
United States	November 5, 2013	Digital download	Freebandz; A1; Epic	
United States	November 12, 2013	Rhythmic contemporary radio	Freebandz; A1; Epic	
