= Lil Double 0 =

American rapper (born 2001)

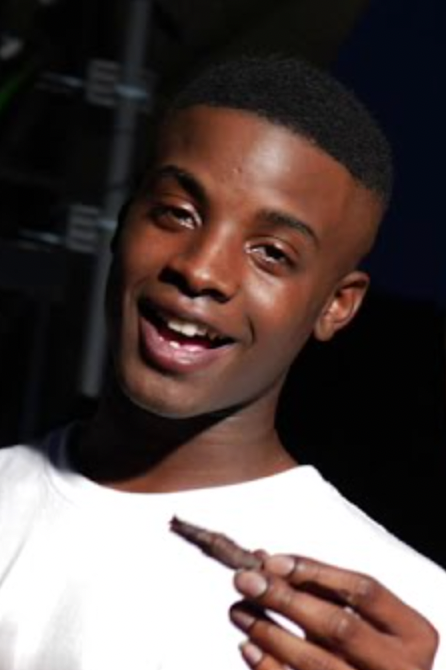
- Lil Double 0 in July 2020

Background information
- Born: Tyreke Rieco Rogers; December 5, 2001 (age 24); Memphis, Tennessee, U.S
- Genres: Hip hop; trap
- Occupations: Rapper; songwriter
- Years active: 2020-present
- Label: Freebandz

Tyreke Rieco Rogers (born December 5, 2001), known professionally as Lil Double 0, is an American rapper from Memphis, Tennessee. He is known for his album Walk Down World which peaked at number 175 on the Billboard 200. He is currently signed to American rapper Future's record label Freebandz.

== Early life and personal life ==
Lil Double 0 played basketball during his youth. He lost two of his closest friends, one to homicide and another to incarceration which pushed him to start a music career.

== Career ==
Lil Double 0 started rapping seriously at the age of 18. He received traction from singles such as "Living" and "007" which helped him grab the attention of record labels. He signed with American rapper Future in 2021. In September 2021, he released his single "U Selling Dope" with his manager and American rapper Future. In October 2022, he released a single with American rapper EST Gee titled "Fight That Switch" alongside a music video. In December 2022, he was arrested in Florida on gun and drug charges, he was released from jail and was put on house arrest a few weeks later.

== Musical style ==
Robby Seabrook III, writing for XXL describes his musical style in the following manner: "What's so distinct about Double 0 is he can do whatever cadence he wants while staying on the same train of thought and weaving together clever lyrics."

== Discography ==
=== Studio albums ===
List of studio albums, with selected details and chart positions
| Title | Studio album details | Peak chart positions |
| Title | Studio album details | US |
|---|---|---|
| Walk Down World | Released: November 4, 2022; Label: Freebandz; Format: Digital download, streaming | 175 |

=== Mixtapes ===
List of mixtapes, with selected details
| Title | Mixtape details |
|---|---|
| 4K | Released: August 12, 2020; Label: M Squad Ent.; Format: Digital download, streaming |
| 223 | Released: November 25, 2020; Label: Freebandz; Format: Digital download, streaming |
| Slimin' 4K Beats | Released: January 22, 2021; Label: M Squad Ent.; Format: Digital download, streaming |
| Walk Down Gang | Released: May 21, 2021; Label: Freebandz, Open Shift; Format: Digital download, streaming |
| Freebirdz | Released: June 7, 2024; Label: Freebandz, Open Shift; Format: Digital download, streaming |
| Laying Da Walkdown | Released: February 20, 2026; Label: Freebandz; Format: Digital download, streaming |

=== Extended plays ===
List of EPs, with selected details
| Title | EP details |
|---|---|
| 4K The Streets | Released: July 15, 2021; Label: Freebandz, Open Shift; Format: Digital download, streaming |
| Dirty Sprite | Released: September 9, 2021; Label: Freebandz, Open Shift; Format: Digital download, streaming |
| IOU1 | Released: April 25, 2025; Label: Freebandz, Open Shift; Format: Digital download, streaming |
| Agent 0 | Released: June 27, 2025; Label: Freebandz, Open Shift; Format: Digital download, streaming |
