= Honest (Future album) =

- Standard edition cover. Deluxe edition features a white color background

Studio album by Future
- Released: April 22, 2014
- Recorded: 2012–2014
- Studios: Chalice; No Name; Westlake (Los Angeles); Eardrumma; In the Box (Hoboken); Larrabee; SlumDrum; Triangle Sound (Atlanta); South Beach (Miami Beach); Terminus (New York City)
- Genre: Trap
- Length: 47:11
- Labels: Freebandz; A1; Epic
- Producers: Detail; DJ Spinz; Katalyst; Metro Boomin; Mike Will Made It; Mr. DJ; Nard & B; Oddfellow; The Order; Organized Noize; The Runners; SoFly and Nius; Sonny Digital; Southside; TM88

Future chronology
Pluto 3D (2012)	Honest (2014)	Monster (2014)

Singles from Honest
- 1. "Karate Chop (Remix)" Released: February 19, 2013; 2. "Honest" Released: August 19, 2013; 3. "Shit" Released: September 24, 2013; 4. "Move That Dope" Released: February 6, 2014; 5. "I Won" Released: April 8, 2014

Honest is the second studio album by American rapper Future. It was released on April 22, 2014, through A1 Recordings and Freebandz, and distributed by Epic Records. The album features guest appearances from Pharrell, Pusha T, Casino, Wiz Khalifa, Kanye West, Drake, Young Scooter, André 3000, and Lil Wayne. It was supported by five singles: "Karate Chop", "Honest", "Shit", "Move That Dope", and "I Won", along with the promotional single, "Real and True".

Honest received generally positive reviews from critics. It debuted at number two on the US Billboard 200, selling 53,000 copies in its first week. The album was certified gold by the Recording Industry Association of America (RIAA).

== Background ==
In June 2012, Future announced his second studio album would be titled Future Hendrix. In September 2012, during an interview with Montreality, he spoke about the album title, saying: "Future Hendrix just comes from being different. Jimi Hendrix, he always stood out, and I always like the way he stood out. It wasn't about me getting that rock'n'roll lifestyle...that comes with this music industry. It's another level; it's striving to be different. I want to do it at the end of February, but it all depends on how these singles do and what this Super Future do." In December 2012, during an interview with Sermon's Domain, he said that the album would be more R&B based, saying: "I want to say [Future Hendrix] will be more R&B based, but it's going to be more substance, more passion - just more down with feeling. I won't compromise who I am…I know my fans who've been down for me from day one, they understand the growth, and they gonna know when they hear Future Hendrix, they'll know that I'm not selling out…they're gonna understand that I'm doing music that was already happening. But I'ma still have street songs. It's gonna be street-driven…[but] it's going to be more filled up with records with substance."

In December 2012, during an interview with Rap-Up, he elaborated on the album title, saying: "It's different; I'm not trying to copy Jimi Hendrix. He played the guitar, I'm a street dude. I'm from the hood. But at the end of the day I understand that being from the hood that I'm different. And I try to find my ways to stand out. And Jimi Hendrix what he did he stood out for the music that he made from the days he came out. Being a black dude and you making rock n' roll music when he wasn't even accepted." He also said the album would feature collaborations with Ciara, Kanye West, Rihanna, Kelly Rowland and Jeremih. On January 15, 2013, Future released the mixtape FBG: The Movie in promotion of the album. It featured guest appearances from Drake, Rocko, Busta Rhymes, Young Scooter and Wale. In January 2013, during an interview with Spin, he spoke about the concept of Future Hendrix, saying:

Yep, it's a statement. It's freedom and passion, freedom of expression. Being melodic, being more free-spirited. Just being myself. Not trying to imitate anyone else. Just going into the booth, doing whatever feels good at the moment, capture the moment, whatever's around me, my surroundings. Using everything as a tool. I feel like a voice for the people, nahmean? You walking down the street and you see something and you get a chance to actually record what you just seen: It's beautiful. Because like, aw, he was talking about me. That's what art is. Painting that picture.

In June 2013, in an interview with Rap-Up, he spoke about the album, saying: "Expect some real classic music. Expect passion and just being able to express myself in a different way on every record. I'm just coming in different, unique ways to approach the track." On August 7, 2013, he announced the album would be released on November 26, 2013, and would be titled Honest, saying: "Honest is the new me. It represents the truth I try to bring to my music. I plan to break the mold with this album so that it will be nothing like you've heard from me or any other artist out. You can either tell the truth or face the Future." In October 2013, during an interview with The Huffington Post, he announced the album would no longer be released on November 26, 2013. In January 2014, in an interview with Elle, he spoke about how he changed the sound of the album halfway through recording, saying:

The album that you gonna get when it comes out is not the album I was working on when I first started recording. It was another kind of album. It was more… I guess I was just expressing myself about everyday life and where I was at then—just emotionally, personally. The beats were slower, had more guitar riffs, just playing around with the piano more and with different instruments. I started going in another direction after I made the "Shit" record. It just flipped the whole album. I got in a whole other mood when I went in the studio. I just started recording, recording, recording as much as possible. I just got in a great zone. I was able to capture the best moments. It helped me make a classic album. It's just going to be very timeless.

On March 9, 2014, Future released the album cover and announced the album would be released on April 22, 2014. On March 10, 2014, the final track listing was released, revealing guest appearances on the album from Pharrell, Pusha T, Casino, Wiz Khalifa, Drake, Kanye West, Young Scooter, André 3000 and Lil Wayne.

== Promotion ==
The album's first single, "Karate Chop (Remix)" featuring Lil Wayne, was released on February 19, 2013. On May 10, 2013, the second sequel to the remix was released, featuring Rick Ross, French Montana and Birdman. The song garnered much controversy due to a lyric in Lil Wayne's verse. The lyric, "Beat that pussy up like Emmett Till", drew much criticism and the ire of Till's family. Emmett Till was a 14-year-old boy who was murdered in the 1950s for allegedly flirting with a white woman. Epic Records apologized for the line and made efforts to take the song down. Future mentioned in an interview with MTV that he was sure Wayne meant no harm, stating, "The record it was done from a good place, good art, he ain't have no bad intentions when he was thinking about it like that". The song was officially re-released with the line edited out of the verse. On May 3, 2013, Lil Wayne was dropped from his endorsement deal with Mountain Dew because of the lyrics. The song peaked at number 82 on the US Billboard Hot 100.

In June 2013, he announced the second single from the album would be called "Honest". He spoke about "Honest", saying: "It's like a club uptempo record. Now's my turn to give them something from me without the features. It's me by myself. I don't have a feature on this." It was released on August 19, 2013, the music video for the song (directed by Colin Tilley) was released on September 11, 2013. The song peaked at number 55 on the Billboard Hot 100.

The music video for the song, "Shit", was released on September 23, 2013, the song was later released on September 24, 2013, as the album's third single. The song peaked at number 45 on the US Hot R&B/Hip-Hop Songs.

The album's fourth single, "Move That Dope" featuring Pharrell, Pusha T and Casino, was released on February 7, 2014. The music video for the song was released on March 6, 2014.

"I Won" featuring Kanye West, was released as the album's fifth single on April 8, 2014, the music video for the song was released on April 17, 2014.

=== Promotional singles ===
The album's promotional single, "Real and True" featuring Mr Hudson and Miley Cyrus, was released on November 5, 2013. In November 2013, he spoke with Rolling Stone, about recording the song "Real and True", saying: "Miley heard the hook and instantly fell in love with the song. She did her vocals and they sent it back to me and I wrote my verses to that and tried to come up with something unique. Her vocals are very strong and emotional on the song. She brings that passion to this record. Miley is really cool and down-to-earth; she's always fun to be around and I'm always cracking up when I'm on set with her." On November 10, 2013, the music video was released for "Real and True" featuring Mr Hudson and Miley Cyrus. The song peaked at number 32 on the Hot R&B/Hip-Hop Songs.

=== Other songs ===
On June 4, 2014, the music video was released for "Blood, Sweat, Tears". On June 24, 2014, the music video was released for "Side Effects". On July 21, 2014, the music video was released for "T-Shirt".

== Critical reception ==
Professional ratings
Aggregate scores
Source	Rating
AnyDecentMusic?	7.4/10
Metacritic	80/100
Review scores
Source	Rating
AllMusic	4/5 stars
The A.V. Club	B+
Consequence	B+
Exclaim!	7/10
Fact	4/5
HipHopDX	3.0/5
Pitchfork	8.1/10
Rolling Stone	4/5 stars
Spin	8/10
USA Today	3/4 stars

Honest was met with generally positive reviews. At Metacritic, which assigns a normalized rating out of 100 to reviews from mainstream publications, the album received an average score of 80, based on 21 reviews. The aggregator AnyDecentMusic? gave it 7.4 out of 10, based on its assessment of the critical consensus.

Simon Vozick-Levinson of Rolling Stone said, "Lots of rappers talk about drugs, but Future is one of the few whose music makes you feel like you're actually on some. When he raps, it's in pulse-racing staccato bursts; when he sings, his Auto-Tuned vowels stretch and melt like alien dreams. Two years after his debut LP, Pluto, sent shock waves through mainstream rap, everyone else is still playing catch-up. Now the Atlanta oddball is vaulting ahead once again with his second album – a weirder, grander, dizzier trip than its predecessor". Sheldon Pearce of Consequence said, "While Pluto explored the depths of Future's gritty, spacey Auto-Tune rap aesthetic, Honest peels back layers of emotional context, narrowing in on what truly makes his raps so compelling: the duality and sincerity of his character". David Jeffries of AllMusic said, "Only bad news to be had is that superior bangers like "Sh!t" and the "Karate Chop" remix with Lil Wayne have to be hunted down as bonus tracks on deluxe editions, but even on the regular version, the world of Future is as wobbly and as wonderful as ever, and thanks to Honest, it just got grand". Craig Jenkins of Pitchfork said, "Honest surges with the self-assurance of an artist finally coming into his own. The bruisers are icepick sharp, the ballads restlessly toy with convention, and Future's heightened ease with both makes Pluto look like a transitional album in retrospect, the dress rehearsal for this, the actual takeover".

Erin Lowers of Exclaim! said, "Honest demonstrates Future's keen ear for production, as well as a sense of realism hidden between braggadocio lyrics, club hooks and reverberating production. By all accounts, Honest reveals that Future's music was never a "right place, right time" story, but one that's unique and has staying power". Evan Rytlewski of The A.V. Club said, "For an A-list rap album, Honest is refreshingly small in scope. It resists grandiose production flourishes, message songs, ambitious themes, run-on suites, and most of the other tropes rappers over-rely on to telegraph importance. Instead it just lets the bangers rip, freeing Future to cruise down his preferred lane unimpeded. Some of his major-label peers might do well to think this small from time to time". Omar Burgess of HipHopDX said, "No one realistically expects Future to make the type of leap Three Stacks did between Southernplayalisticadillacmuzik and ATLiens. But if he expounds on the type of substance he hints at on "Special", his album cuts will be as equally potent as his singles. For now, he's returned with a slightly updated, less flawed version of 2012's Pluto. It's not the classic balance of style and substance ushered in by the Dungeon Family's first generation. But it does help further the argument that both elements aren't mutually exclusive". Chris Kelly of Fact said, "Honest doesn't have the shock-of-the-new that Pluto offered during its finest moments, which is understandable: Future's Auto-Tuned weirdness has quickly become part of the Southern rap fabric".

=== Year-end lists ===
Select year-end rankings of Honest
Publication	List	Rank	Ref.
Billboard	Ten Best Rap Albums of 2014	9	
Rolling Stone	50 Best Albums of 2014	43	
Spin	40 Best Hip-Hop Albums of 2014	10	
Stereogum	40 Best Rap Albums of 2014	18	
Vibe	46 Best Albums of 2014	45	

=== Industry awards ===
Awards and nominations for Honest
Year	Ceremony	Category	Result	Ref.
2014	BET Hip Hop Awards	Album of the Year	Nominated	

== Commercial performance ==
Honest debuted at number two on the Billboard 200, with first-week sales of 53,000 copies in the United States. In its second week, the album sold 20,000 more copies. In its third week, the album sold 11,000 more copies. In its fourth week, the album sold 8,000 more copies. As of June 2014, the album has sold 111,000 copies in the United States. The album was certified gold by the Recording Industry Association of America (RIAA) for combined sales and album-equivalent units of over 500,000 units in the United States.

== Track listing ==
Honest track listing
No.	Title	Writer(s)	Producer(s)	Length
1.	"Look Ahead"	Nayvadius Wilburn; Andrew Harr; Jermaine Jackson; Mariam Doumbia^{[c]}; Marc Antoine Moreau^{[c]}; Santi White^{[c]}	The Runners	3:33
2.	"T-Shirt"	Wilburn; Brandon Rackley; James Rosser, Jr.	Nard & B	3:35
3.	"Move That Dope" (featuring Pharrell, Pusha T and Casino)	Wilburn; Pharrell Williams; Terrence Thornton; Rico Buice; Tauheed Epps; Michael Williams; Pierre Slaughter; Hurby Azor^{[d]}; Raymond Davies^{[d]}	Mike Will Made It; P-Nasty^{[a]}	5:40
4.	"My Momma" (featuring Wiz Khalifa)	Wilburn; Cameron Thomaz; M. Williams; Justin Garner	Mike Will Made It; J-Bo^{[a]}	3:40
5.	"Honest"	Wilburn; Gary Hill; Leland Wayne	DJ Spinz; Metro Boomin	3:20
6.	"I Won" (featuring Kanye West)	Wilburn; Kanye West; Nick Seeley; Wayne; Theron Thomas; Timothy Thomas	Metro Boomin; Rock City^{[b]}	3:59
7.	"Never Satisfied" (featuring Drake)	Wilburn; Aubrey Graham; M. Williams; Matthew Samuels; Slaughter	Mike Will Made It; Boi-1da^{[a]}; P-Nasty^{[a]}	1:55
8.	"I Be U"	Wilburn; Andre Proctor; Noel Fisher	Detail; The Order	3:52
9.	"Covered N Money"	Wilburn; Sonny Uwaezuoke	Sonny Digital	3:35
10.	"Special" (featuring Young Scooter)	Wilburn; Joshua Luellen; Bryan Simmons	Southside; TM88	4:56
11.	"Benz Friendz (Whatchutola)" (featuring André 3000)	Wilburn; André Benjamin; David Sheats; Patrick Brown; Ray Murray; Rico Wade; Billy Vaughn^{[e]}	Mr. DJ; Organized Noize	4:41
12.	"Blood, Sweat, Tears"	Wilburn; Brent Kolatalo; Kenneth Lewis; T. Thomas; T. Thomas	Katalyst	4:23
Total length:				47:11

Deluxe edition (bonus tracks)
No.	Title	Writer(s)	Producer(s)	Length
13.	"Big Rube Speaks"	Ruben Bailey		1:07
14.	"Side Effects"	Wilburn; Proctor; Fisher; Yoan Chirescu; Raphaël Judrin; Pierre-Antoine Melki	Detail; Oddfellow; The Order; SoFly and Nius	2:00
15.	"I'll Be Yours"	Wilburn; Proctor; Fisher	Detail; The Order	3:00
16.	"How Can I Not" (featuring Young Scooter)	Wilburn; Kenneth Bailey; Wayne	Metro Boomin	3:58
17.	"Shit"	Wilburn; M. Williams; Garner	Mike Will Made It; J-Bo^{[a]}	4:52
18.	"Karate Chop" (Remix) (featuring Lil Wayne)	Wilburn; Dwayne Carter; Wayne	Metro Boomin	4:36
Total length:				66:42

Notes

- ^{^[a]} signifies a co-producer
- ^{^[b]} signifies an additional producer

Sample credits

- ^{^[c]} "Look Ahead" contains a sample from "Dougou Badia" written by Mariam Doumbia, Marc Antoine Moreau, and Santi White, as performed by Amadou & Mariam.
- ^{^[d]} "Move That Dope" contains a portion of the composition "Push It" written by Hurby Azor and Raymond Davies, as performed by Salt-N-Pepa.
- ^{^[e]} "Benz Friendz (Whatchutola)" contains a sample from "Traci's Tracks" written and performed by Billy Vaughn.

== Personnel ==
Credits for Honest adapted from AllMusic.

- Rock City – additional production
- Chris Feldmann – art direction, creative direction, design
- Ryan Kaul – assistant
- Rodney "Rocko" Hill – associate executive production
- Kanye West – featured artist
- Pharrell Williams – featured artist
- LaTrice Burnette – creative direction
- Sam Lecca – creative direction
- Seth Firkins – engineering, mixing
- Cooper Anderson – engineering
- Andrew Drucker – engineering
- Jeff Edwards – engineering
- Noah Goldstein – engineering
- Hart Gunther – engineering
- Stephen Hybicki – engineering
- Eric Manco – engineering
- Ken Oriole – engineering
- James Yost – engineering
- Mike Will Made It – executive production, production
- André 3000 – featured artist
- Casino – featured artist
- Drake – featured artist
- Pusha T – featured artist
- Young Scooter – featured artist
- Wiz Khalifa – featured artist
- Nick Seeley – guitar, piano, strings
- J.D. Anderson – photography
- Glenn Schick – mastering
- Leslie Brathwaite – mixing
- Jaycen Joshua – mixing
- Jonathan Mannion – photography
- Future – primary artist, production
- P-Nasty – production, vocals
- Mr. DJ – production
- Boi-1da – production
- SoFly and Nius – production
- Detail – production
- Sonny Digital – production
- DJ Spinz – production
- 808 Mafia – production
- J-Bo – production
- Katalyst – production
- Metro Boomin – production
- N.A.R.D. – production
- The Order – production
- Organized Noize – production
- The Runners – production
- Southside – production
- TM88 – production
- Marjan Malakpour – stylist
- Kevin McCall – vocals

== Charts ==
=== Weekly charts ===
Chart performance for Honest
Chart (2014)	Peak position
Belgian Albums (Ultratop Wallonia)	103
Canadian Albums (Billboard)	6
French Albums (SNEP)	81
Swiss Albums (Schweizer Hitparade)	99
UK Albums (Official Charts)	78
UK R&B Albums (Official Charts)	10
US Billboard 200	2
US Top R&B/Hip-Hop Albums (Billboard)	1

=== Year-end charts ===
2014 year-end chart performance for Honest
Chart (2014)	Position
US Billboard 200	155
US Top R&B/Hip-Hop Albums (Billboard)	31

== Certifications ==
Certifications for Honest
Region	Certification	Certified units/sales
United States (RIAA)	Gold	500,000^{‡}
^{‡} Sales+streaming figures based on certification alone.
