= Honest (Future song) =

Single by Future

from the album Honest
- Released: August 19, 2013
- Recorded: 2013
- Genre: Southern hip hop · trap · hip hop
- Length: 3:21
- Label: A1; Freebandz; Epic
- Songwriters: Nayvadius Wilburn; Gary Hill; Leland Wayne
- Producers: DJ Spinz; Metro Boomin

Future singles chronology
"I Wanna Be with You" (2013)	"Honest" (2013)	"No Games" (2013)

"Honest" is a song by American rapper Future. It was released on August 19, 2013, as the second single from his second studio album of the same name. The song has peaked at number 55 on the Billboard Hot 100. The song addressed Future had an accusation of his net worth and child support and lied to his mother.

== Music video ==
On September 11, 2013, the music video directed by Colin Tilley was released.

== Charts ==
=== Weekly charts ===
Chart (2013)	Peak position
US Billboard Hot 100	55
US Hot R&B/Hip-Hop Songs (Billboard)	18

=== Year-end charts ===
Chart (2013)	Position
US Hot R&B/Hip-Hop Songs (Billboard)	82

== Certifications ==
Region	Certification	Certified units/sales
United States (RIAA)	Platinum	1,000,000^{‡}
^{‡} Sales+streaming figures based on certification alone.

== Release history ==
Country	Date	Format	Label
United States	August 19, 2013	Rhythmic contemporary radio	A1, Freebandz, Epic
United States	August 19, 2013	Mainstream urban radio	A1, Freebandz, Epic
United States	September 10, 2013	Digital download	A1, Freebandz, Epic
