= I Won =

2014 single by Future featuring Kanye West

Single by Future featuring Kanye West

from the album Honest
- Released: April 8, 2014
- Recorded: 2013
- Genre: Hip hop; downtempo
- Length: 3:56
- Label: A1; Freebandz; Epic
- Songwriters: Nayvadius Wilburn; Kanye West; Leland Wayne; Theron Thomas; Timothy Thomas; Nick Seely
- Producers: Metro Boomin; Rock City; Seely

Future singles chronology
"Move That Dope" (2014)	"I Won" (2014)	"Hold You Down" (2014)

Kanye West singles chronology
"Thank You" (2013)	"I Won" (2014)	"Nobody" (2014)

Music video
- "I Won" on YouTube

"I Won" is a song by American rapper Future featuring fellow American rapper Kanye West. The song was released on April 8, 2014, as the fifth single from the former's second studio album, Honest (2014). The song features Future and West rapping about their respective then-fiancées, Ciara and Kim Kardashian, whom they see as their "trophy wives". Following its release, the song peaked at number 98 on the Billboard Hot 100 chart.

In August 2014, Ciara broke off her engagement to Future due to infidelity on his part. Kardashian and West are divorced as of June 2022.

== Background ==
"I Won" by Future was produced by Metro Boomin and features a guest appearance from fellow American rapper Kanye West. The song features Future and Kanye West rapping about their respective fiancées, Ciara and Kim Kardashian. Overall the song is about the rapper's fiancées being their trophy wives. Future takes control of the song's first part, performing romantic and sexual bars through a massive layer of auto-tune.

West starts his verse by mentioning his daughter North West saying, "You grew up on J. Lo, Timberlands by Manolo now, till one day I put an angel in your ultra sound." Later in his verse West cleverly insults Kardashian's exes Reggie Bush and Kris Humphries simultaneously with the line, "I made it over NBA, NFL players so every time I score it's like the Super Bowl". As ever, West appears fully aware of the reaction he's bound to receive when he says "If people don't hate then it won't be right." Kanye West also makes reference to his infamous music video for his single "Bound 2" and Kardashian's sisters and mother. The latter reference closing his part of the song with West saying, "You could look at Kylie, Kendall, Kourtney and Khloe, All your mama ever made was trophies, right?", praising Kim and all her sisters as beautiful.

In an April 2014 interview with Pitchfork, Future spoke of the song saying, ""I Won" is not a love song. It's just me uplifting women in general. I'm giving women the power to treat themselves as a trophy—to show that and know it in yourself and be confident—because when they do that, whoever they're with is winning. I'm not teaching motherfuckers how to love."

== Promotion ==
To promote the song, Future released an online game to go with the song on May 7, 2014. The concept of the game is to click on either Future or Kanye West to make them throw gold chains at the women walking across the beach in their view. If the player hits the women with the chain they become trophies similar to the single cover. Upon its release, the video was criticized by writers for major publications as sexist. Gaby Whitehill of Gigwise stated, "'I Won' saw Future and Kanye boast about how attractive their respective spouses - Ciara and Kim Kardashian - are, calling them "trophies". Now, you too can turn grown adult women into inanimate objects with the 'I Won' video game! To gain points, carelessly toss chains at bikini-clad women as they saunter across the beach, and turn them into a gold cup. Brilliant. Play it below, if you really hate yourself/women that much." Lauren Duca of Huffington Post said, "That warranted a conversation about an intersectional understanding of marriage. The horrifyingly sexist video game that Future released this week as a companion to the song? That really only warrants a conversation about the next available time you can take a shower."

== Music video ==
The music video for "I Won" was filmed on a picturesque California beach and was directed by Hype Williams in March 2014. Speaking of the video with Hot 97 later that month, Future said, "It's incredible. We on the water, we on the beach, and it's beautiful women. We made [them] look like the old Hype Williams video girls, when video girls were stars back then." The clip was released on April 17, 2014. In the black-and-white video West and Future "serenade a slew of curvaceous models striking sexy poses on a private beach." Noticeably, both Ciara and Kim Kardashian do not appear in the music video.

== Critical reception ==
"I Won" was met with generally positive reviews from music critics. Chris DeVille of Stereogum called the song excellent and praised the production.

== Chart performance ==
"I Won" sold 19,276 copies in its first week in the United States according to Nielsen Soundscan, which ended on April 13, 2014. It would be highest debut on the Billboard Hot R&B/Hip-Hop Songs chart that week. The single peaked at number 98 on the US Billboard Hot 100 and spent only a total of 3 weeks on the chart. On December 16, 2015, the song was certified Gold by the Recording Industry Association of America (RIAA) for sales of over 500,000 digital copies in the United States.

== Charts ==
=== Weekly charts ===
Chart (2014)	Peak position
Belgium Urban (Ultratop Flanders)	34
UK Hip Hop/R&B (Official Charts)	28
UK Singles (OCC)	169
US Billboard Hot 100	98
US Hot R&B/Hip-Hop Songs (Billboard)	26
US Hot Rap Songs (Billboard)	17

=== Year-end charts ===
Chart (2014)	Position
US Hot R&B/Hip-Hop Songs (Billboard)	76
US Hot Rap Songs (Billboard)	46

== Certifications ==
Region	Certification	Certified units/sales
United States (RIAA)	Gold	500,000^{‡}
^{‡} Sales+streaming figures based on certification alone.

== Release history ==
Country	Date	Format	Label	Ref.
United States	April 8, 2014	Digital download	A1 Recordings, Freebandz, Epic Records	
United States	April 14, 2014	Mainstream urban radio	A1 Recordings, Freebandz, Epic Records	
United Kingdom	April 21, 2014	Urban contemporary radio	A1 Recordings, Freebandz, Epic Records	
United States	July 1, 2014	Rhythmic contemporary radio	A1 Recordings, Freebandz, Epic Records	
