= Shit (song) =

Single by Future

from the album Honest (Deluxe Version)
- Released: September 24, 2013
- Recorded: 2013
- Genre: Trap
- Length: 4:52
- Label: A1; Freebandz; Epic
- Songwriters: Nayvadius Cash; Michael Williams
- Producer: Mike Will Made It

Future singles chronology
"Ready" (2013)	"Shit" (2013)	"Real and True" (2013)

"Shit" (stylized as "$h!t"), edited for radio as "Shhh..." is a song by American hip hop recording artist Future. It was released on September 24, 2013, as the third single from his second studio album, Honest (2014). The song has since peaked at number 34 on the US Billboard Hot R&B/Hip-Hop Songs.

== Remixes ==
On December 14, 2013, it was announced Canadian rapper Drake, would appear on the song's remix. On December 15, 2013, it was revealed fellow American rappers Schoolboy Q, Jeezy, Pastor Troy, T.I. and Juicy J, were also added to the remix. On December 17, 2013, a remix featuring Drake and Juicy J was released, which appears on DJ Esco's No Sleep mixtape. On December 19, 2013, the "ATL remix" was released which features Pastor Troy, Jeezy and T.I. On December 20, 2013, a remix featuring West Coast rapper Schoolboy Q and hip hop mogul Sean "Diddy" Combs, was released. On December 23, 2013, the song's producer Mike Will Made It, released a mixtape titled #MikeWillBeenTrill, which was hosted by Future. The mixtape includes a "Megamix" of the song, featuring verses from rappers Drake, Jeezy, T.I., Juicy J, Schoolboy Q, Diddy and Pastor Troy.

== Music video ==
On September 23, 2013, the music video was released.

== Track listing ==
Digital single

No.	Title	Writer(s)	Producer(s)	Length
1.	"Sh!t"	Nayvadius Cash, Michael Williams, Justin Garner	Mike Will Made It, JBo	4:52

== Charts ==
Chart (2013)	Peak position
US Bubbling Under Hot 100 (Billboard)	17
US Hot R&B/Hip-Hop Songs (Billboard)	34

== Release history ==
Country	Date	Format	Label	Ref
United States	September 24, 2013	Digital download	A1, Freebandz, Epic	
