= Move That Dope =

2014 single by Future

Single by Future featuring Pharrell Williams, Pusha T and Casino

from the album Honest
- Released: February 6, 2014
- Recorded: 2012–13 (Black Mamba Records, Los Angeles, California)
- Genre: Hip-hop
- Length: 5:42 (album version with Casino); 3:58 (radio edit no Casino)
- Label: A1; Freebandz; Epic
- Songwriters: Nayvadius Wilburn; Terrence Thornton; Pharrell Williams; Rico Buice; Michael Williams; Pierre Slaughter; Kenneth Bailey; Rodney Hill; Maceo Barnes; Raymond Davies; Hurby Azor
- Producers: Mike Will Made It; P-Nasty

Future singles chronology
"Real and True" (2013)	"Move That Dope" (2014)	"I Won" (2014)

Pharrell singles chronology
"Happy" (2013)	"Move That Dope" (2014)	"Aerosol Can" (2014)

Pusha T singles chronology
"Nosetalgia" (2013)	"Move That Dope" (2014)	"Maybe" (2014)

Music video
- "Move That Dope" on YouTube

Music video
- "Move That Dope (Extended)" on YouTube

"Move That Dope" (edited version titled as "Move That Doh") is a song by American rapper Future featuring fellow American rappers Pharrell Williams, Pusha T and Casino. It was released on February 6, 2014 as the fourth single from Future's second studio album, Honest. Production was handled by the album's executive producer, Mike Will Made It, with co-production by P-Nasty. Casino's verse was omitted from the radio version of the song.

"Move That Dope" peaked at number 46 on the US Billboard Hot 100.

== Music video ==
On March 6, 2014, the music video was released. Both Casino and his verse were not featured in the video. However, the extended version does feature Casino. The video includes cameo appearances by Tyler, the Creator, Schoolboy Q, Mike Will Made It, and Wiz Khalifa.

== Accolades ==
Publication	Accolade	Rank
Rolling Stone	50 Best Songs of 2014	4
Pitchfork	The 100 Best Tracks of 2014	9
Pazz & Jop	Single of the Year 2014	16
Spin	The 101 Best Songs of 2014	22
Complex	The 50 Best Songs of 2014	37
Wondering Sound	75 Best Songs of 2014	38
PopMatters	The 75 Best Songs of 2014	75
Tiny Mix Tapes	Favorite 50 Songs of 2014	*

(*) designates unordered list.

=== Awards and nominations ===
Year	Ceremony	Award	Result
2014	2014 BET Hip Hop Awards	Best Hip Hop Video	Nominated
2014	2014 BET Hip Hop Awards	Best Collabo, Duo or Group	Nominated
2014	2014 BET Hip Hop Awards	Track of the Year	Nominated
2014	2014 BET Hip Hop Awards	Best Club Banger	Won
2014	2014 BET Hip Hop Awards	Sweet 16 (Best Featured Verse)	Nominated
2014	2014 BET Hip Hop Awards	People's Champ Award	Nominated

== Chart performance ==
"Move That Dope" peaked at number 46 on the US Billboard Hot 100. It spent a total of 18 weeks on the chart. The song was certified gold by the Recording Industry Association of America (RIAA) for sales of 500,000 digital copies in the United States.

== Charts ==
=== Weekly charts ===
Chart (2014)	Peak position
Belgium Urban (Ultratop Flanders)	42
US Billboard Hot 100	46
US Hot R&B/Hip-Hop Songs (Billboard)	11
US Rhythmic Airplay (Billboard)	18

=== Year-end charts ===
Chart (2014)	Position
US Hot R&B/Hip-Hop Songs (Billboard)	42

== Certifications ==
Region	Certification	Certified units/sales
United States (RIAA)	Platinum	1,000,000^{‡}
^{‡} Sales+streaming figures based on certification alone.
