= Chuuwee =

American rapper

- Born: Dionte Hunter; September 7, 1990 (age 35)
- Origin: Sacramento, California, United States
- Genres: Hip Hop
- Label: Below System / Making Loud Noise (www.belowsystem.com)

Dionte Hunter, better known by his stage name Chuuwee (born September 7, 1990), is an American hip hop artist from Sacramento, California. Chuuwee spent many years of his life moving around as a child. He lived in nearly every neighborhood of Sacramento, CA before moving to San Antonio in middle school.

Chuuwee has established a strong underground presence and is regularly featured on popular hip hop blogs and websites, such as 2DopeBoyz, HipHopDX, DJBooth, AllHipHop, Complex Magazine, and others. He also received a feature in XXL magazine. He was interviewed by Forbes at SXSW '12 as a rising artist.

In 2010 Chuuwee was introduced to the manager of Max B and CEO of hip-hop label Amalgam Digital, later known as Anyextee, who after hearing the track "Post Mortem" immediately signed the rapper to his management company, leveraging the label to promote his independent project "Watching The Throne". In 2011 Anyextee officially signed Chuuwee as a recording artist to the Amalgam Digital record label joining the home of Joe Budden, Curren$y, Lil B and other notable acts.

Chuuwee has worked with in the past include Cookin' Soul, Lee Bannon, Large Professor, as well as many others. He was previously signed to Below System Records for digital distribution and has released two albums (South Sac Mack / AmeriKKa's Most Blunted 2) through the label..

He produced the first full music video shot in volumetric virtual reality in a 2016 collaboration with 8i Reality.

== Discography ==
=== Albums ===
- Amerikkas Most Blunted (with Trizz) (2014)
- The Chuuwee Channel (2014)
- Economics (2016)
- Amerikkas Most Blunted 2 (with Trizz) (2016)
- Paradiso (2017)
- Purgator (2017)
- Sabbath (2017)
- PassOver (with Khalisol) (2018)
- The $ Bag (with Rich Icy) (2018)
- HUBRIS (2018)
- Amerikkas Most Blunted 3 (with Trizz) (2018)
- The Tip of a Tab (PO +) (2018)
- Nephilim (2019)
- Non Fortuna (2019)
- 3.5 (Eighth) (with Trizz) (2020)
- HoLLoW BaSTioN (2020)
- Babylon (2020)
- Hear No Equal (Unreleased Singles and Ideas) (2020)
- Coronado (2020)

=== Mixtapes ===
- Mauve Monster (2009)
- Life of a Backpacker w/ Konkwest & Rufio (2009)
- Sunday Afternoon (2010)
- The Date Tape w/ Cookin' Soul (2010)
- So Far So Good (2010)
- Hot N' Ready w/ Lee Bannon (2010)
- Be Cool w/ Jonathan Lowell (2011)
- Watching the Throne (2011)
- Ch3z!: The Tape (2012)
- Crown Me King (2012)
- The Millennium Falcon(EP.1) [with Sundown(Actual Proof)] (2012)
- Ch3z!!?...Chill: A J Dilla Tribute (2012)
- Wild Style (2012)
- Hear No Equal (2013)
- Wild Style: B Side (2013)
- No Retail EP (2013)
- ThriLL (2013)
- The Great Gatzby (with Shae Money) (2013)
- Amerikkas Most Blunted (with Trizz) (2014)
- Cool World (2014)
- 9k (2014)
- The South Sac Mack (with JR & PH7) (2015)
- Commerce EP (2016)
- 26 (2016)
- Super Supreme (with Saltreze) (2016)
- Club 27 (2017)
- Oni over Rice - Single (2019)
