= 2014 BET Hip Hop Awards =

Annual edition for the awards show

- Date: October 14, 2014
- Location: Atlanta Civic Center
- Hosted by: Snoop Dogg

Television/radio coverage
- Network: BET

The 2014 BET Hip Hop Awards was held on October 14, 2014 at Atlanta Civic Center in the ATL. The nominations were announced on September 4, 2014. Snoop Dogg returned as the event's host. Canadian rapper Drake leads the nominations with 8 nominations, while Jay-Z, Pharrell and Future follow him with six. DJ Mustard won the most awards with 4 wins, followed by Drake with 3 wins.

== Performances ==
List of the performers were announced on September 18, 2014:

- Rae Sremmurd – "No Flex Zone!"
- Rich Gang featuring Young Thug, Rich Homie Quan and Birdman – "Lifestyle"
- Common featuring Vince Staples and Jay Electronica - "Kingdom"
- Migos - "Fight Night" and "Handsome and Wealthy"
- DJ Mustard featuring Lil Boosie, Ty Dolla $ign and YG - "Face Down", "Paranoid" and "My Hitta"
- Brandy featuring MC Lyte, Yo-Yo and Queen Latifah - "I Wanna Be Down" (Hip Hop Remix)
- T.I. featuring Young Thug - "About the Money"
- Bobby Shmurda - "Hot Boy"

== Cyphers ==
- Pre-Show Cypher: T-Rex, Goodz, Tsu Surf and Rain 910
- Cypher 1: Tuki Carter, Berner, Chevy Woods, Ty Dolla $ign, Juicy J and Wiz Khalifa
- Cypher 2: Vic Mensa, Snow Tha Product, King Los, Treach and David Banner
- Cypher 3: Troy Ave, Detroit Che, Dee-1, Logic and Lil Mama
- Cypher 4: Jarren Benton, Corey Charron, Remy Ma and Papoose
- Cypher 5: O.T. Genasis, Kevin Gates, G-Eazy and Loaded Lux
- Cypher 6: Arsonal, Couture, Calicoe and Murda Mook

== Nominations ==
=== Best Hip Hop Video ===
Drake - "Worst Behavior"

- Future (featuring Pharrell, Pusha T & Casino) - "Move That Doh"
- Iggy Azalea (featuring Charli XCX) - "Fancy"
- J. Cole (featuring TLC) - "Crooked Smile"
- Nicki Minaj - "Pills N Potions"
- Wiz Khalifa - "We Dem Boyz"

=== Best Collabo, Duo or Group ===
YG (featuring Jeezy & Rich Homie Quan) - "My Hitta"

- Eminem (featuring Rihanna) - "The Monster"
- Future (featuring Pharrell, Pusha T & Casino) - "Move That Doh"
- Jay-Z (featuring Justin Timberlake) - "Holy Grail"
- Schoolboy Q (featuring BJ the Chicago Kid) - "Studio"

=== Best Live Performer ===
Kanye West

- Drake
- Jay-Z
- Kendrick Lamar
- T.I.

=== Lyricist of the Year ===
Kendrick Lamar

- Drake
- Eminem
- J. Cole
- Jay-Z
- Nicki Minaj

=== Hip Hop Video Director ===
Hype Williams

- Benny Boom
- Chris Robinson
- Director X
- Dre Films

=== DJ of the Year ===
DJ Mustard

- DJ Drama
- DJ Envy
- DJ Khaled
- DJ Scream

=== Producer of the Year ===
DJ Mustard

- Drumma Boy
- Hit-Boy
- Mike WiLL Made It
- Pharrell
- Timbaland

=== MVP of the Year ===
DJ Mustard

- Drake
- Future
- Jay-Z
- Nicki Minaj

=== Track of the Year ===
Only the producer of the track nominated in this category.

"My Hitta" - Produced by DJ Mustard (YG featuring Jeezy & Rich Homie Quan)

- "Cut Her Off" (Remix) - Produced by Will-A-Fool (K Camp featuring Lil Boosie, YG, & Too $hort)
- "Move That Doh" - Produced by Mike WiLL Made It (Future featuring Pharrell, Pusha T & Casino)
- "Studio" - Produced by Swiff D (Schoolboy Q featuring BJ the Chicago Kid)
- "Worst Behavior" - Produced by DJ Dahi (Drake)

=== Album of the Year ===
Drake - Nothing Was the Same

- Eminem - The Marshall Mathers LP 2
- Future - Honest
- Rick Ross - Mastermind
- Schoolboy Q - Oxymoron
- Yo Gotti - I Am

=== Who Blew Up Award / Rookie of the Year ===
Iggy Azalea

- Migos
- Rich Homie Quan
- Schoolboy Q
- YG
- Young Thug

=== Hustler of the Year ===
Dr. Dre

- Drake
- Jay-Z
- Rick Ross
- T.I.

=== Made-You-Look Award / Best Hip Hop Style ===
Nicki Minaj

- A$AP Rocky
- Jay-Z
- Kanye West
- Young Thug

=== Best Hip Hop Online Site ===
WorldStarHipHop.com

- AllHipHop.com
- Complex.com
- HotNewHipHop.com
- NecoleBitchie.com
- RapRadar.com

=== Best Club Banger ===
Future (featuring Pharrell, Pusha T & Casino) - "Move That Doh" (Produced by Mike WiLL Made It)

- K Camp (featuring Lil Boosie, YG, & Too $hort) - "Cut Her Off" (Remix) (Produced by Will-A-Fool)
- Migos - "Fight Night" (Produced by Stack Boy Twaun)
- Wiz Khalifa - "We Dem Boyz" (Produced by Detail)
- YG (featuring Jeezy & Rich Homie Quan) - "My Hitta" (Produced by DJ Mustard)
- Young Thug - "Stoner" (Produced by Dun Deal)

=== Best Mixtape ===
Wiz Khalifa - 28 Grams

- Action Bronson - Blue Chips 2
- Fabolous - The Soul Tape 3
- Migos - No Label 2
- Rich Homie Quan - I Promise I Will Never Stop Going In

=== Sweet 16 (Best Featured Verse) ===
Kendrick Lamar - "Control" (Big Sean featuring Kendrick Lamar & Jay Electronica)

- B.o.B - "Paranoid" (Ty Dolla Sign featuring B.o.B)
- B.o.B - "Up Down (Do This All Day)" (T-Pain featuring B.o.B)
- Drake - "Who Do You Love" (YG featuring Drake)
- Pharrell - "Move That Doh" (Future featuring Pharrell, Pusha T & Casino)

=== Impact Track ===
Common (featuring Vince Staples) - "Kingdom"

- Lecrae - "Nuthin"
- Lupe Fiasco - "Mission"
- The Roots (featuring Patty Cash) - "Never"
- Talib Kweli (featuring Abby Dobson) - "State of Grace"

=== People's Champ Award ===
Drake - "Worst Behavior"

- Future (featuring Pharrell, Pusha T & Casino) - "Move That Doh"
- Iggy Azalea (featuring Charli XCX) - "Fancy"
- Wiz Khalifa - "We Dem Boyz"
- YG (featuring Lil Wayne, Nicki Minaj, Meek Mill & Rich Homie Quan) - "My Hitta (Remix)"

=== I Am Hip Hop Award ===
Doug E. Fresh
