= Josh Baze =

American hip hop recording artist, model and actor

Josh Baze (born August 13, 1990) is an American hip hop recording artist, model, and actor from Brooklyn, New York. He is signed to Griffin Guess' music label, Cartel Records, and released his debut album High-Heels & Low-Lifes on March 20, 2012.

== Early life ==
Josh Baze was born and raised in Brooklyn, New York, a few blocks from Biggie Smalls' childhood home. As a child, Baze was heavily influenced by his father's career as a DJ. Baze attended his father's shows at Bishop Perry Hall in Harlem, and also at various festivals and local swap meets, to help father sell his albums. According to Baze, "It wasn't just work to him, it was art. It was something he breathed, something he felt [and] something he ate. I learned so much [being with him]."

With his father's collection at hand, Baze began to explore music at an early age. Throughout his teenage years, Baze wrote and produced his own sounds using a PC and an outdated version of Cool Edit Pro. To help finance his music projects, Baze also took on multiple modeling and acting jobs—most notably modeling for Italian fashion label Versace.

== Music career ==
=== Career beginnings ===
In the summer of 2010, Baze connected with Griffin Guess, a music producer who has worked with hip hop artists Kanye West, Jay Z, 50 Cent, and Eminem for marketing and music development. Baze officially signed under Guess' label Cartel Records and, in early 2011, flew to Los Angeles to record his debut album at Paramount Studios.

=== 2011: Debut releases, Grammy Academy, and "We Made It" video ===
In April 2011, Baze released the songs "Hollyhood" and "Peroxide" exclusively through iTunes.

In May 2011, music video director-producer Hype Williams signed on to direct Baze's music video for the single "We Made It". The single was released in July, and the video debuted as iTunes Video of the Week on November 8, 2011, and premiered on E! News on November 30. Three months later, Baze's video was voted MTVu's Freshman Video of the Week.

On July 13, 2011, Baze also became the first hip hop artist to be invited for an exclusive meet-and-greet and private performance at the Grammy Academy. Baze was the featured guest for an installment of The Recording Academy's "5 Questions With …" series, held at their headquarters in Santa Monica, California. Following the interview, Baze performed an intimate set featuring tracks from his forthcoming debut full-length album, including "Ordinary", "Peroxide" and "We Made It". GRAMMY.com also debuted the song "Escape". The song was described as, "an urban expression of Baze's New York upbringing, [that] sheds light on how he is coping with jealousy and learning to deal with his newfound success."

On August 12, 2011, Baze was asked to perform at the 3rd Annual Matt Barnes Athletes vs. Cancer Celebrity Golf Classic Gala in Rancho Palos Verdes, California.

=== 2012–present: "Ghosts N Stuff" and Hi-Heels & Low-Lifes ===
Three months before the release of Baze's debut album, AOL Music released "Ghosts N Stuff", Baze's free promotional cover of a Deadmau5 track.

On February 27, 2012, Baze's "We Made It" music video premiered on BET's 106 & Park.

Josh Baze's debut album, Hi-Heels & Low-Lifes, was released on March 20, 2012. Hi-Heels & Low-Lifes was released exclusively through iTunes before its release in other major retail outlets. The album was executively produced by Griffin Guess and co-produced by Josh Baze, Andrew Drucker, Ernie J. and Kevin Rafferty. Celebrity supporters include Marisa Miller—who also appears on the cover of the album,-- Jamie Foxx, 50 Cent, Chad Ochocinco, Floyd Mayweather, Mike Tyson, Michael Phelps, and Randy Moss.

Baze describes Hi-Heels & Low-Lifes as an "all-purpose" album for all ages, depicting the first twenty-one years of his life. The album has been noted for its blend of smooth cadences, lyrical creativity and commercial appeal, and Baze is often compared to artists like Kanye West and Jay Z.

Baze began his promotional talk show rounds in early March 2012 on Last Call with Carson Daly, where he performed the singles "One More Chance" and "She's Gold".

In April 2012, Baze performed on Jimmy Kimmel Live and The Wendy Williams Show, and also took part in an interview session with DJ Skee on Los Angeles' Top 40 radio station KIIS-FM.

On May 15, 2012, Baze performed as the headlining act at the MLB Fan Cave Concert Series in New York.

During the summer of 2012, Baze's single "She's Gold" was added into national radio rotation. "She's Gold" arched the No. 3 spot on Sirius XM's 20 on 20 Countdown. iHeart Radio also named Josh Baze "Artist You Should Know" on all Clear Channel Urban and Rhythmic platforms nationwide. The "She's Gold" music video, directed by Griffin Guess, was shot in Los Angeles and premiered on MTV.com and Vevo.com in mid-September, 2012. E! News debuted the video on October 10.

Baze was signed to CAA in early 2012 for music and acting, securing a spot on Ludacris' college tour, performances with 2 Chainz, as well as direct support on Childish Gambino's 2012 'Camp' tour.

In October 2012, Baze was featured on Hot 97's "Who's Next Showcase" at SOB's in New York City and, in November 2012, Baze appeared as a featured performer and guest on The Nick & Artie Show.
