= Karate Chop (song) =

Single by Future featuring Lil Wayne

from the album Honest
- Released: February 19, 2013
- Recorded: 2012
- Genre: Hip hop; trap
- Length: 4:36
- Label: A1; Freebandz; Epic
- Songwriters: Nayvadius Wilburn; Dwayne Carter, Jr.; Leland Wayne
- Producer: Metro Boomin

Future singles chronology
"Bugatti" (2013)	"Karate Chop" (2013)	"U.O.E.N.O." (2013)

Lil Wayne singles chronology
"All That (Lady)" (2013)	"Karate Chop" (2013)	"Tapout" (2013)

"Karate Chop" is a song by American rapper Future from his second studio album Honest. The song was produced by Metro Boomin and originally had a feature from rapper Casino. However, the remix features fellow American rapper Lil Wayne. The remix was released as the lead single of the album on February 19, 2013. It debuted at #100 on the Billboard Hot 100 and since then has peaked at #82.

== Background and release ==
"Karate Chop" was originally written by Future and Lil Wayne. It was produced by Metro Boomin and originally featured a verse from Free Band Gang member Casino. The original version of the track appeared on DJ Spinz and DJ Pretty Boy Tank's mixtape We Are Radio 6. Future premiered the song on January 25, 2013, and it was sent to urban radio on January 29, 2013.

Metro Boomin stated in an interview with XXL magazine how the record came about. He explained: "I actually made that beat before I moved to Atlanta... I never really liked it, but once I moved to Atlanta I just started going to the studio with Future like everyday. So one day, I didn't come, and when I showed up the next day he played "Karate Chop". And I just didn't like it at all. Then every time people would come in to the studio, he would always play the record...". The song was officially remixed featuring a guest appearance from American rapper Lil Wayne and was released as the lead single for his upcoming album, Future Hendrix, later to be retitled Honest. The Lil Wayne remix became a bonus track on the album. It was sent to urban and rhythmic radio and released for digital download on February 19, 2013.

== Remix ==
On May 10, the song's official remix was released featuring Rick Ross, French Montana and Birdman, called the RichMix. Metro Boomin also released a remix to the song featuring Wiz Khalifa in late May 2013. Young Buck, Young Dro, Riff Raff, and Jeremih have also released remixes to the song.

== Critical reception ==
Pitchfork Media ranked it number 80 on a list of the 100 best songs of 2013: "His staccato-fied rhymes, supremely druggy performance, and computer-assisted warble reduce his verses to a jumble of phonemes that you have to squint at to recognize as actual words. Combined with a beat by wunderkind producer Metro Boomin’ that pairs a Hendrix-y synthesized guitar lick with blaring Inception-style horns, the song announced his new push into updating 60s psychedelia for the digital age."

50 Cent told NME that the song made him want to dance: "He's a guy who's got a rock 'n' roll edge to him: he's a drinking, drugging kind of guy and he's crazy. Hip-hop now is so much more diverse than it's ever been – and Future, to me, best represents that crazy, different world."

== Emmett Till controversy ==
The song has garnered much controversy due to a lyric in rapper Lil Wayne's verse. The lyric, "Beat that pussy up like Emmett Till", drew much criticism and the ire of Till's family. Emmett Till was a 14-year-old boy who was murdered in the 1950s for allegedly flirting with a white woman. Epic Records apologized for the line and made efforts to take the song down. Future mentioned in an interview with MTV that he's sure Wayne meant no harm, stating, "The record it was done from a good place, good art, he ain't have no bad intentions when he was thinking about it like that". The song was officially re-released with the line edited out of the verse. (On the version which appears on Honest, only Till's name is edited) On May 3, 2013, Lil Wayne was dropped from his endorsement deal with Mountain Dew because of the lyrics.

== Chart performance ==
=== Weekly charts ===
Chart (2013)	Peak position
US Billboard Hot 100	82
US Hot R&B/Hip-Hop Songs (Billboard)	27
US Hot Rap Songs (Billboard)	19

=== Year-end charts ===
Chart (2013)	Position
US Hot R&B/Hip-Hop Songs (Billboard)	72

== Release history ==
List of release dates by region, including format details, and record label
Region	Date	Format	Version	Label
United States	January 29, 2013	Urban radio	Original version	Epic Records
United States	February 19, 2013	Digital download	Remix version	Epic Records
United States	February 19, 2013	Urban radio	Remix version	Epic Records
United States	February 19, 2013	Rhythmic radio	Remix version	Epic Records
