= Freebandz =

American record label

Freebandz Entertainment
- Parent company: Sony Music Entertainment (SME)
- Founded: 2011
- Founder: Future
- Distributor: Epic
- Genre: Hip-hop; trap
- Country of origin: United States
- Location: Atlanta, Georgia
- Official website: freebandz.com

Freebandz (or Freebandz Entertainment, business name of Wilburn Holding Co.) is an American record label founded by Atlanta-based rapper Future in 2011. The label's releases are distributed through Epic Records. Freebandz has signed artists including Real Boston Richey, Lil Double O, Doe Boy, Young Scooter and DJ Esco.

== History ==
=== 2011–2012: We Global ===
Freebandz was founded by Future. Future signed a major label deal with Epic Records in September 2011, days before the release of his mixtape, Streetz Calling. The mixtape was described by XXL magazine as ranging from "simple and soundly executed boasts" to "futuristic drinking and drugging jams" to "tales of the grind." A Pitchfork review remarked that on the mixtape Future comes "as close as anyone to perfecting this thread of ringtone pop, where singing and rapping are practically the same thing, and conversing 100% through Auto-Tune doesn't mean you still can't talk about how you used to sell drugs. It would almost feel antiquated if Future weren't amassing hits, or if he weren't bringing some subtle new dimensions to the micro-genre."

Though Future had told MTV that Streetz Calling would be his final mixtape prior to the release of his debut studio album, another mixtape, Astronaut Status, was released in January 2012. In December 2011, Future was featured on the cover of Issue #77 of The FADER. Before his album being released in April 2012. XXL's Troy Mathews wrote, "While Astronaut Status is up and down and never really hits the highs like 'Racks', 'Tony Montana', and 'Magic' that fans have come to expect from Future, it’s apparent that he’s poised to continue the buzz of 2011 humming right along into 2012." Future was selected to the annual XXL Freshmen list in early 2012.

His debut album Pluto, originally planned for January, was eventually released on April 17. It included remixes of "Tony Montana" featuring Drake and "Magic" featuring T.I. According to Future, "'Magic' was the first record T.I. jumped on when he came outta jail. Like, he was out of jail a day and he jumped straight on the 'Magic' record without me even knowing about it." The track became Future's first single to enter the Billboard Hot 100 chart. Other collaborators on the album include Trae Tha Truth, R. Kelly and Snoop Dogg On October 8, 2012, Pusha T released "Pain" featuring Future, the first single from his upcoming debut album.

It was announced that Future will be repackaging his debut album Pluto on November 27, 2012 under the name Pluto 3D featuring 3 new songs and 2 remix songs including the remix for "Same Damn Time" featuring Diddy and Ludacris, as well as his newest street single "Neva End (Remix)" featuring Kelly Rowland. In 2012, Future wrote, produced and was featured on "Loveeeeeee Song" taken from Barbadian singer Rihanna's seventh studio album Unapologetic.

=== 2013–present: Various projects ===
On January 15, 2013, Future released the compilation mixtape F.B.G.: The Movie which features the artists signed to his Freebandz label: Young Scooter, Casino, Maceo, Mexico Rann, and Slice 9. It was certified platinum for having over 250,000 downloads on popular mixtape site DatPiff. Future said of his second studio album Future Hendrix it will be a more substantive musical affair than his debut album and will feature R&B music along with his usual "street bangers". The album was to be released in 2013. The album would feature Kanye West, Rihanna, Ciara, Drake, Kelly Rowland, Jeremih, Diplo, and André 3000, among others.

The album's lead single, "Karate Chop" featuring Casino, premiered on January 25, 2013 and was sent to urban radio on January 29, 2013. The song is produced by Metro Boomin. The official remix, which features Lil Wayne, was sent radio and was released on iTunes on February 19, 2013. On August 7, 2013, Future changed the title of his second album from Future Hendrix to Honest and announced that it would be released on November 26, 2013. It was later revealed that the album would be pushed back to April 22, 2014, as it was said that Future has tour dates with Drake on Would You Like A Tour?. Future released DS2 on July 16, 2015.

On September 20, 2015, Future released a joint-mixtape with Canadian rapper Drake, What a Time to Be Alive.

On January 17, 2016, Future released another mixtape, titled Purple Reign, with productions from Metro Boomin, Southside, Zaytoven, and more.

On February 5, 2016, Future premiered his fourth studio album on DJ Khaled's debut of his We The Best Radio show on Beats 1.

== Musical style ==
Future uses Auto-Tune in his songs. Singer T-Pain, who also uses that audio processor, criticized Future, stating that the rapper doesn't know how to use it correctly. After that announcement Future stated in an interview; "When I first used Auto-Tune, I never used it to sing. I wasn't using it the way T-Pain was. I used it to rap because it makes my voice sound grittier. Now everybody wants to rap in Auto-Tune. Future's not everybody."

== Notable artists ==
- Future
- DJ Esco
- Tru Life
- Lil Double 0
- Real Boston Richey
- Mud Murkk

== Former artists ==
- Doe Boy
- Young Scooter (deceased)
- ZeeTheWizard (deceased)

== Discography ==
=== Studio albums ===
- Pluto (2012)
- Honest (2014)
- DS2 (2015)
- Evol (2016)
- Future (2017)
- Hndrxx (2017)
- Kolorblind (2018)
- The Wizrd (2019)
- High Off Life (2020)
- I Never Liked You (2022)
- Mixtape Pluto (2024)
- The Real Me (2026)

=== Duo projects ===
- Freebandz Presents: The Music Tape (2024)

== Awards and nominations ==
=== BET Awards ===
The BET Awards were established in 2001 by the Black Entertainment Television network to celebrate African Americans and other individuals in music, acting, sports, and other fields of entertainment over the past year.

Year	Category	Nominated work	Result	Ref.
2012	Best New Artist (Future)	—N/a	Nominated	
2013	Best Male Hip-Hop Artist (Future)	—N/a	Nominated	
2014	Best Male Hip-Hop Artist (Future)	—N/a	Nominated	

=== BET Hip Hop Awards ===
The BET Hip Hop Awards are an annual awards show, airing on BET, showcasing hip-hop performers, producers and music video directors.

Year	Category	Nominated work	Result	Ref.
2013	Best Collabo, Duo or Group (Future)	"Bugatti" (with Ace Hood and Rick Ross)	Nominated	
2013	Best Featured Verse (Future)	"Bugatti" (with Ace Hood and Rick Ross)	Nominated	
2014	MVP of the Year (Future)	—	Nominated	
2014	Album of the Year (Future)	Honest	Nominated	
2014	Best Collabo, Duo or Group (Future)	"Move That Dope" (with Pharrell, Pusha T and Casino)	Nominated	
2014	Best Club Banger (Future)	"Move That Dope" (with Pharrell, Pusha T and Casino)	Won	
2014	Best Hip Hop Video (Future)	"Move That Dope" (with Pharrell, Pusha T and Casino)	Nominated	
2014	People's Champ Award (Future)	"Move That Dope" (with Pharrell, Pusha T and Casino)	Nominated	

=== Much Music Video Awards ===
The Much Music Video Awards are annual awards presented by the Canadian TV channel Much to honour the year's best music videos.

Year	Category	Nominated work	Result	Ref.
2015	Best Hip Hop Video (Future)	"DnF" (Future with P Reign and Drake)	Won	
