= Billboard Year-End Hot R&B/Hip-Hop Songs of 2012 =

American music chart

This is a list of Billboard magazine's Top Hot R&B/Hip-Hop Songs of 2012.

No.	Title	Artist(s)
1	"Love On Top"	Beyoncé
2	"Climax"	Usher
3	"Lotus Flower Bomb"	Wale featuring Miguel
4	"The Motto"	Drake featuring Lil Wayne
5	"Mercy"	Kanye West featuring Big Sean, Pusha T and 2 Chainz
6	"Adorn"	Miguel
7	"Heart Attack"	Trey Songz
8	"No Lie"	2 Chainz featuring Drake
9	"Strip"	Chris Brown featuring Kevin McCall
10	"Make Me Proud"	Drake featuring Nicki Minaj
11	"Niggas in Paris"	Jay-Z and Kanye West
12	"Nobody's Perfect"	J. Cole featuring Missy Elliott
13	"Drank in My Cup"	Kirko Bangz
14	"Lemme See"	Usher featuring Rick Ross
15	"Birthday Cake"	Rihanna featuring Chris Brown
16	"Cashin' Out"	Cash Out
17	"Party"	Beyoncé
18	"Up!"	LoveRance featuring Iamsu! and Skipper or 50 Cent
19	"Another Round"	Fat Joe featuring Chris Brown
20	"Dance (Ass)"	Big Sean featuring Nicki Minaj
21	"Leave You Alone"	Young Jeezy featuring Ne-Yo
22	"Stay"	Tyrese
23	"Bag of Money"	Wale featuring Rick Ross, Meek Mill and T-Pain
24	"Thank You"	Estelle
25	"Can't Get Enough"	J. Cole featuring Trey Songz
26	"Mr. Wrong"	Mary J. Blige featuring Drake
27	"Tonight (Best You Ever Had)"	John Legend featuring Ludacris
28	"I Do"	Young Jeezy featuring Jay-Z and André 3000
29	"Take It to the Head"	DJ Khaled featuring Chris Brown, Rick Ross, Nicki Minaj and Lil Wayne
30	"Pop That"	French Montana featuring Rick Ross, Drake and Lil Wayne
31	"Rack City"	Tyga
32	"Crew Love"	Drake featuring The Weeknd
33	"Dance for You"	Beyoncé
34	"Put It Down"	Brandy featuring Chris Brown
35	"4 AM"	Melanie Fiona
36	"Turn On the Lights"	Future
37	"You the Boss"	Rick Ross featuring Nicki Minaj
38	"Ayy Ladies"	Travis Porter featuring Tyga
39	"That Way"	Wale
40	"Sex Ain't Better Than Love"	Trey Songz
41	"Amen"	Meek Mill featuring Drake
42	"Pray for Me"	Anthony Hamilton
43	"Love After War"	Robin Thicke
44	"Dive In"	Trey Songz
45	"Beez in the Trap"	Nicki Minaj featuring 2 Chainz
46	"Thinkin Bout You"	Frank Ocean
47	"Refill"	Elle Varner
48	"Bandz a Make Her Dance"	Juicy J featuring Lil Wayne and 2 Chainz
49	"She Will"	Lil Wayne featuring Drake
50	"Enough of No Love"	Keyshia Cole featuring Lil Wayne
51	"Fool for You"	CeeLo Green featuring Melanie Fiona
52	"Headlines"	Drake
53	"2 Reasons"	Trey Songz featuring T.I.
54	"Do It Like You"	Diggy featuring Jeremih
55	"Take Care"	Drake featuring Rihanna
56	"Round of Applause"	Waka Flocka Flame featuring Drake
57	"Magic"	Future featuring T.I.
58	"Birthday Song"	2 Chainz featuring Kanye West
59	"Clique"	Kanye West, Jay-Z and Big Sean
60	"Gotta Have It"	Jay-Z and Kanye West
61	"Share My Love"	R. Kelly
62	"Countdown"	Beyoncé
63	"Same Damn Time"	Future
64	"Work Out"	J. Cole
65	"Work Hard, Play Hard"	Wiz Khalifa
66	"Feelin' Single"	R. Kelly
67	"Blessed"	Jill Scott
68	"Woo"	Anthony Hamilton
69	"You're On My Mind"	Kem
70	"Lately"	Anita Baker
71	"5 O'Clock"	T-Pain featuring Wiz Khalifa and Lily Allen
72	"Touch'N You"	Rick Ross featuring Usher
73	"Talk That Talk"	Rihanna featuring Jay-Z
74	"Go Get It"	Mary Mary
75	"Beautiful Surprise"	Tamia
76	"Real Love"	Eric Benét
77	"Right by My Side"	Nicki Minaj featuring Chris Brown
78	"Stay Together"	Ledisi featuring Jaheim
79	"Girl on Fire"	Alicia Keys
80	"Sweet Love"	Chris Brown
81	"All Tied Up"	Robin Thicke
82	"Body 2 Body"	Ace Hood featuring Chris Brown
84	"Sabotage"	Wale featuring Lloyd
85	"Till I Die"	Chris Brown featuring Big Sean and Wiz Khalifa
86	"Faded"	Tyga featuring Lil Wayne
87	"Wet the Bed"	Chris Brown featuring Ludacris
88	"Sure Thing"	Miguel
89	"Until It's Gone"	Monica
90	"Swimming Pools (Drank)"	Kendrick Lamar
91	"Diced Pineapples"	Rick Ross featuring Wale and Drake
92	"Ice"	Kelly Rowland featuring Lil Wayne
93	"Next Breath"	Tank
94	"Marvin & Chardonnay"	Big Sean featuring Kanye West and Roscoe Dash
95	"Let's Talk"	Omarion featuring Rick Ross
96	"I Don't Like"	Chief Keef featuring Lil Reese
97	"Lazy Love"	Ne-Yo
98	"My Homies Still"	Lil Wayne featuring Big Sean
99	"So Gone (What My Mind Says)"	Jill Scott featuring Paul Wall
100	"No Worries"	Lil Wayne featuring Detail

== See also ==
- 2012 in music
- Billboard Year-End Hot 100 singles of 2012
- Billboard Year-End Hot Rap Songs of 2012
- List of number-one R&B/hip-hop songs of 2012 (U.S.)
