= Billboard Year-End Hot Rap Songs of 2012 =

American music chart

This is a list of Billboard magazine's Top Hot Rap Songs of 2012.

No.	Title	Artist(s)
1	"The Motto"	Drake featuring Lil Wayne
2	"Mercy"	Kanye West featuring Big Sean, Pusha T and 2 Chainz
3	"Niggas in Paris"	Jay-Z and Kanye West
4	"Drank in My Cup"	Kirko Bangz
5	"Take Care"	Drake featuring Rihanna
6	"No Lie"	2 Chainz featuring Drake
7	"Make Me Proud"	Drake featuring Nicki Minaj
8	"Cashin' Out"	Cash Out
9	"Lotus Flower Bomb"	Wale featuring Miguel
10	"Leave You Alone"	Young Jeezy featuring Ne-Yo
11	"Dance (Ass)"	Big Sean featuring Nicki Minaj
12	"Rack City"	Tyga
13	"Work Out"	J. Cole
14	"Up!"	LoveRance
15	"Can't Get Enough"	J. Cole featuring Trey Songz
16	"Nobody's Perfect"	J. Cole featuring Missy Elliott
17	"Work Hard, Play Hard"	Wiz Khalifa
18	"Pop That"	French Montana featuring Rick Ross, Drake and Lil Wayne
19	"Young, Wild & Free"	Snoop Dogg and Wiz Khalifa featuring Bruno Mars
20	"Take It to the Head"	DJ Khaled featuring Chris Brown, Rick Ross, Nicki Minaj and Lil Wayne
21	"Headlines"	Drake
22	"Good Feeling"	Flo Rida
23	"I Do"	Young Jeezy
24	"Bag of Money"	Wale featuring Rick Ross, Meek Mill and T-Pain
25	"Amen"	Meek Mill featuring Drake

== See also ==
- 2012 in music
- Billboard Year-End Hot 100 singles of 2012
- Billboard Year-End Hot R&B/Hip-Hop Songs of 2012
- List of Billboard number-one rap singles of 2012
