= 2012 BET Hip Hop Awards =

Annual edition for the awards show

- Date: October 9, 2012
- Location: Atlanta Civic Center
- Hosted by: Mike Epps

Television/radio coverage
- Network: BET

The 2012 BET Hip Hop Awards was held on October 9, 2012, at Atlanta Civic Center in the ATL, hosted by Mike Epps. The nominations were announced on September 13, 2012. Kanye West leads the nominations with 17 nominations, followed by 2 Chainz with 13 and Drake with 11.

== Performances ==
The list of performers was announced on September 13, 2012:

- "Work Hard, Play Hard" (Remix)/"Bandz a Make Her Dance" - Wiz Khalifa feat. Young Jeezy & Juicy J
- "Amen"/"Young & Gettin' It" - Meek Mill feat. Kirko Bangz
- "The Recipe"/"Swimming Pools (Drank)" - Kendrick Lamar
- "Birthday Song"/"I'm Different" - 2 Chainz
- "Trap Back Jumpin"/"Go Get It" - T.I.
- "Turn on the Lights"/"Same Damn Time" (Remix) - Future feat. Diddy
- "Wild Boy" - MGK
- "Pop That" - French Montana feat. Uncle Luke
- "Hold Me Back"/"Ice Cold" - Rick Ross feat. Omarion

== Cyphers ==
- Internet Exclusive Cypher 1 - Brianna Perry, Relly, Fame, The Kid Daytona, K-La, Tito Lopez
- Internet Exclusive Cypher 2 - Core Masson, Kosha Dillz, Boy Jones
- Internet Exclusive Cypher 3 - Lil Niqo, Lil Waah, Lil Chuckee
- Cypher 1 - Trae tha Truth, Chip, Iggy Azalea, B.o.B, & T.I. of Grand Hustle Records
- Cypher 2 - JUS formally JayBird The Purdi Boi, Hopsin, ScHoolboy Q, Mac Miller, & Mystikal
- Cypher 3 - Jean Grae, Sarkodie, Ab-Soul, & Talib Kweli
- Cypher 4 - Angel Haze, Joey Bada$$, Driicky Graham, Childish Gambino, & ASAP Rocky
- Cypher 5 - Xzibit, YG, Kurupt, E-40, DJ Quik, Kendrick Lamar, & Snoop Dogg
- Cypher 6 - Murda Mook, Cassidy, Eve, & DMX of Ruff Ryders

== Nominations ==
=== Best Hip Hop Video ===
Drake featuring Lil Wayne – "HYFR"

- 2 Chainz featuring Drake – "No Lie"
- A$AP Rocky – "Goldie"
- Wale featuring Miguel – "Lotus Flower Bomb"
- Kanye West featuring Big Sean, Pusha T and 2 Chainz – "Mercy"

=== Reese’s Perfect Combo Award (Best Collabo, Duo or Group) ===
Kanye West featuring Big Sean, Pusha T and 2 Chainz – "Mercy"

- 2 Chainz featuring Drake – "No Lie"
- Drake featuring Lil Wayne and Tyga – "The Motto (Remix)"
- J. Cole featuring Missy Elliott – "Nobody's Perfect"
- Wale featuring Miguel – "Lotus Flower Bomb"

=== Best Live Performer ===
The Throne (Jay Z & Kanye West)

- A$AP Rocky
- Drake
- J. Cole
- Kanye West

=== Lyricist of the Year ===
Kendrick Lamar

- J. Cole
- Jay Z
- Nas
- Kanye West

=== Video Director of the Year ===
Hype Williams

- A$AP Rocky & Sam Lecca
- Benny Boom
- Chris Robinson
- Kanye West

=== Producer of the Year ===
Kanye West

- Hit-Boy
- J. Cole
- J.U.S.T.I.C.E. League
- No I.D.

=== MVP of the Year ===
Rick Ross

- 2 Chainz
- J. Cole
- Jay Z
- Kanye West

=== Track of the Year ===
Only the producer(s) of the track nominated in this category.

"Ni**as in Paris" – Produced By Kanye West, Hit-Boy & Mike Dean [The Throne (Jay-Z & Kanye West)]

- "Cashin' Out" – Produced By DJ Spinz (Ca$h Out)
- "Ima Boss" – Produced By Jahlil Beats (Meek Mill featuring Rick Ross)
- "No Lie" – Produced By Mike Will Made It and co-produced by Marz (2 Chainz featuring Drake)
- "The Motto (Remix)" – Produced By T-Minus (Drake featuring Lil Wayne and Tyga)

=== CD of the Year ===
The Throne (Jay Z & Kanye West) – Watch the Throne

- Common – The Dreamer/The Believer
- Drake – Take Care
- J. Cole – Cole World: The Sideline Story
- Young Jeezy – TM:103 Hustlerz Ambition

=== DJ of the Year ===
DJ Khaled

- DJ Drama
- DJ Enuff
- DJ Envy
- DJ Funkmaster Flex

=== Rookie of the Year ===
2 Chainz

- A$AP Rocky
- Ca$h Out
- Future
- Meek Mill

=== Made-You-Look Award (Best Hip-Hop Style) ===
Kanye West

- 2 Chainz
- A$AP Rocky
- Big Sean
- Nicki Minaj

=== Best Club Banger ===
The Throne (Jay-Z & Kanye West) – "Ni**as in Paris" (Produced By Kanye West, Hit-Boy & Mike Dean)

- Ca$h Out – "Cashin' Out" (Produced By DJ Spinz)
- Drake featuring Lil Wayne and Tyga – "The Motto (Remix)" (Produced By T-Minus)
- Future – "Same Damn Time" (Produced By Sonny Digital)
- Kanye West featuring Big Sean, Pusha T and 2 Chainz – "Mercy" (Produced By Lifted)

=== Best Mixtape ===
Meek Mill – Dreamchasers 2

- A$AP Rocky – LIVE.LOVE.A$AP
- Joey Bada$$ – 1999
- Rick Ross – Rich Forever
- Wiz Khalifa – Taylor Allderdice

=== Sweet 16: Best Featured Verse ===
2 Chainz – "Mercy" (Kanye West featuring Big Sean, Pusha T and 2 Chainz)

- Diddy – "Same Damn Time (Remix)" (Future featuring Diddy & Ludacris)
- Drake – "Stay Schemin'" (Rick Ross featuring Drake and French Montana)
- Ludacris – "Same Damn Time (Remix)" (Future featuring Diddy & Ludacris)
- T.I. – "Magic (Remix)" (Future featuring T.I.)

=== Hustler of the Year ===
Jay Z

- 2 Chainz
- Lil Wayne
- Rick Ross
- Kanye West

=== Impact Track ===
Nas – "Daughters"

- Lupe Fiasco – "Around My Way (Freedom Ain't Free)"
- Lupe Fiasco – "B*tch Bad"
- The Throne (Jay Z & Kanye West) – "Murder to Excellence"

=== People's Champ Award ===
2 Chainz featuring Drake – "No Lie"

- Driicky Graham – "Snapbacks & Tattoos"
- Meek Mill featuring Rick Ross – "Ima Boss"
- The Throne (Jay Z & Kanye West) featuring Otis Redding – "Otis"
- Kanye West featuring Big Sean, Pusha T and 2 Chainz – "Mercy"

=== Best Hip Hop Online Site ===
WorldStarHipHop.com

- 2DopeBoyz.com
- Allhiphop.com
- Complex.com
- HipHopDX.com
- NahRight.com
- RapRadar.com

=== I Am Hip Hop Award ===
Rakim
