= Billboard Year-End Hot 100 singles of 2012 =

Ranking of recorded music

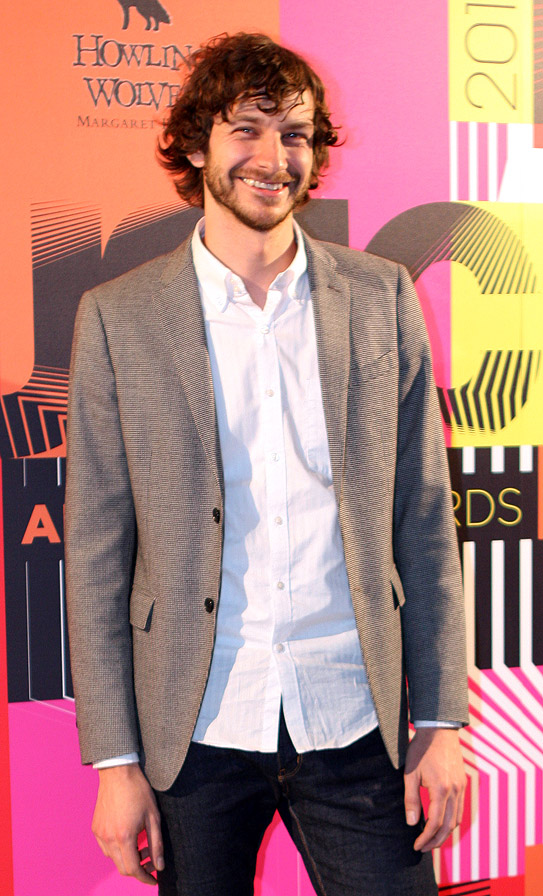
Gotye's single, "Somebody That I Used to Know", came in at number one, spending a total of 8 weeks at number one throughout the year.

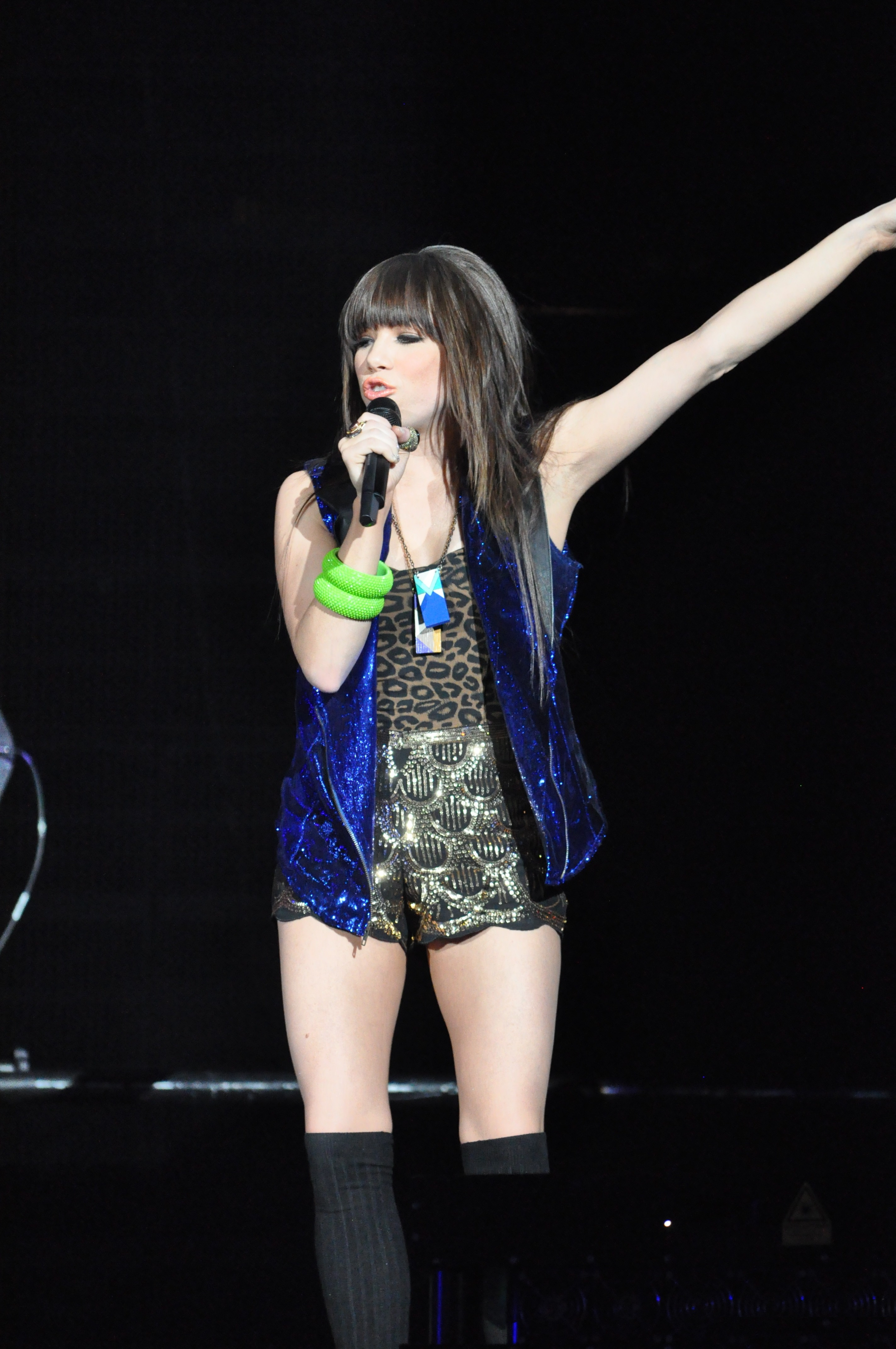
Singer Carly Rae Jepsen, whose single "Call Me Maybe" appeared at number 2, is the highest-ranking solo song by a female artist on the list.

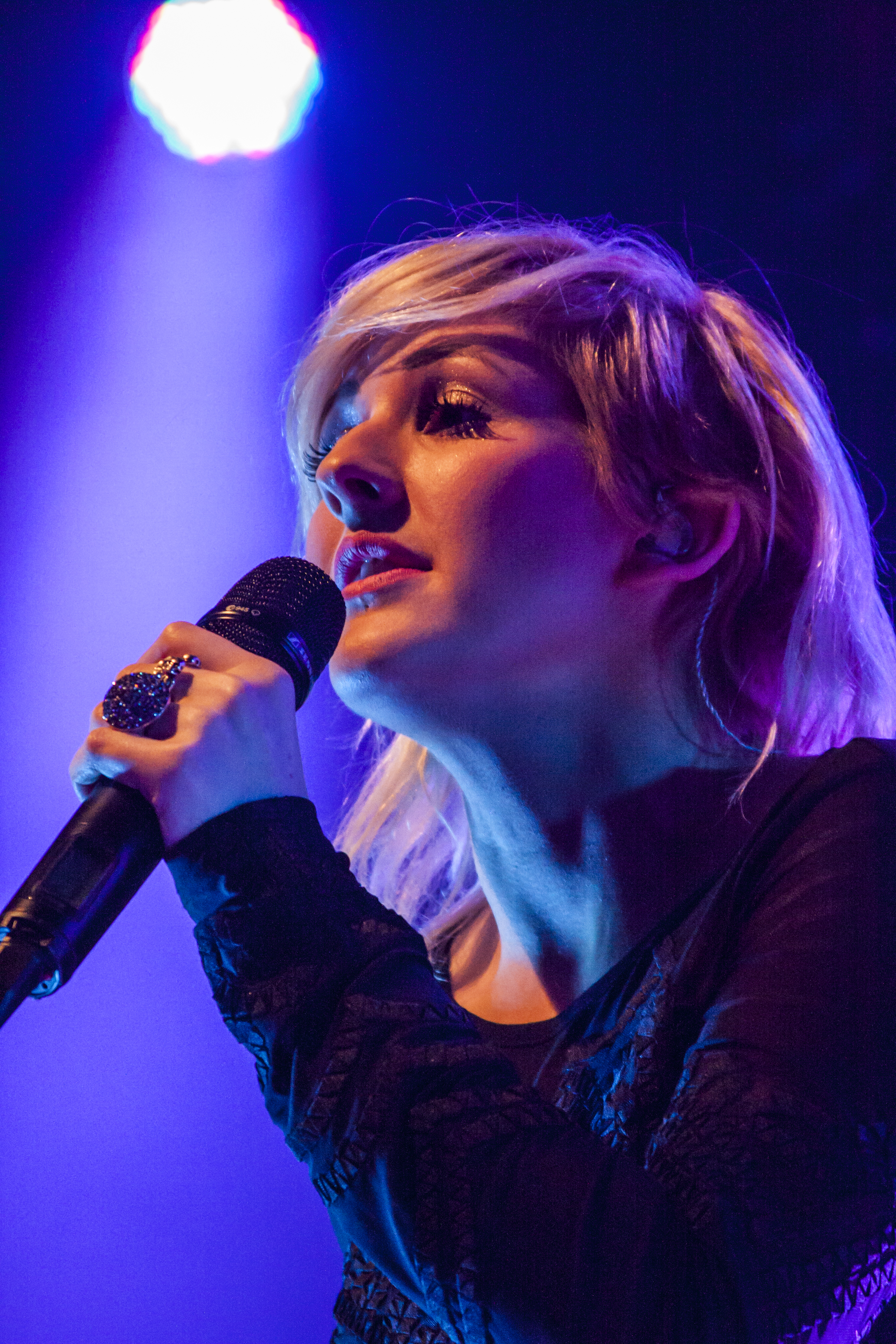
Singer Ellie Goulding, whose single "Lights" appeared at number 5, is the highest-ranking British artist on the list.

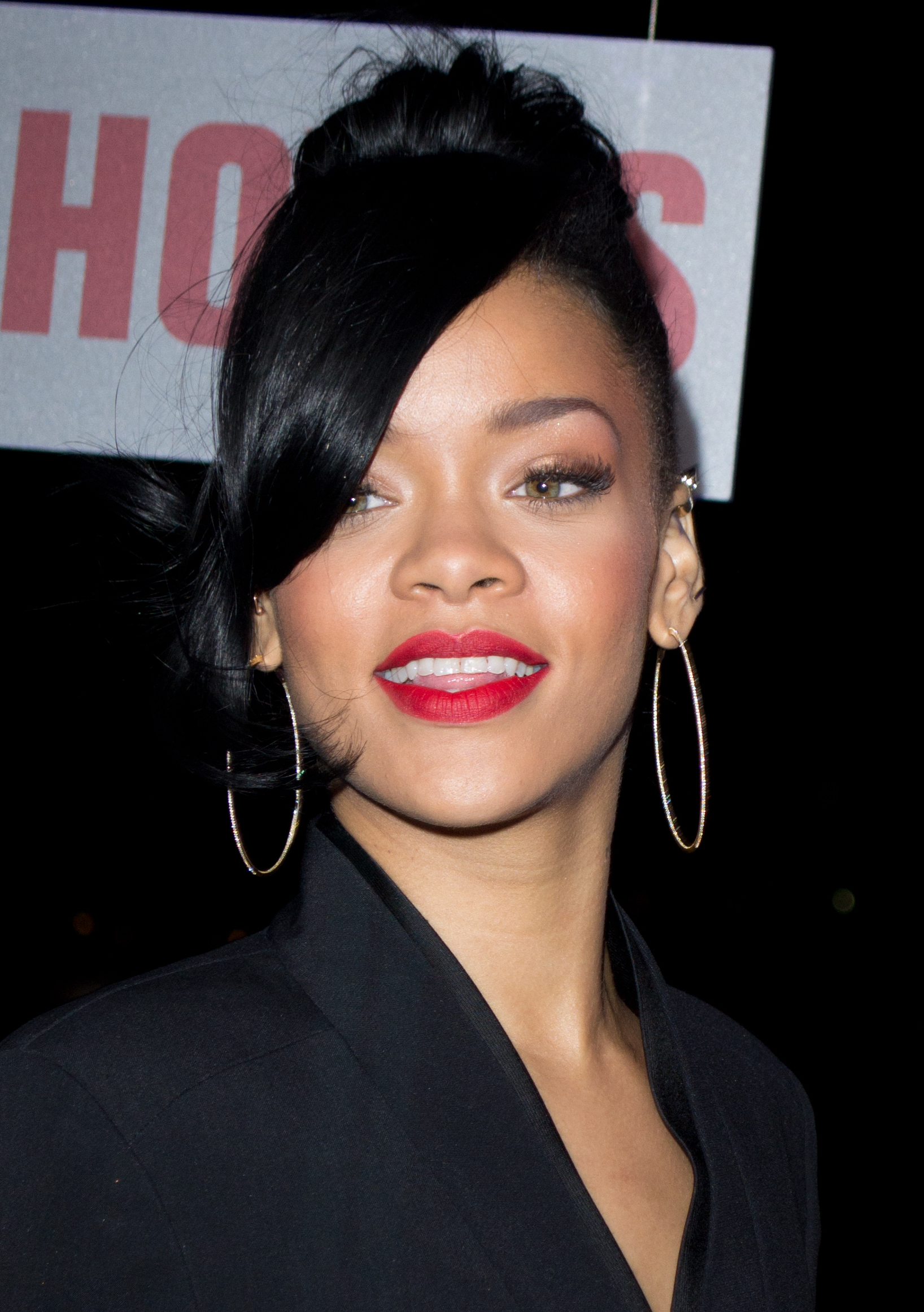
Barbadian singer Rihanna's "We Found Love" came in at number 69 in 2011 and rose to position 8 this year. She had a total of six songs included on the list, with her as a lead artist on 5 songs. Four of which were from her sixth album Talk That Talk, and one was from her seventh album Unapologetic.

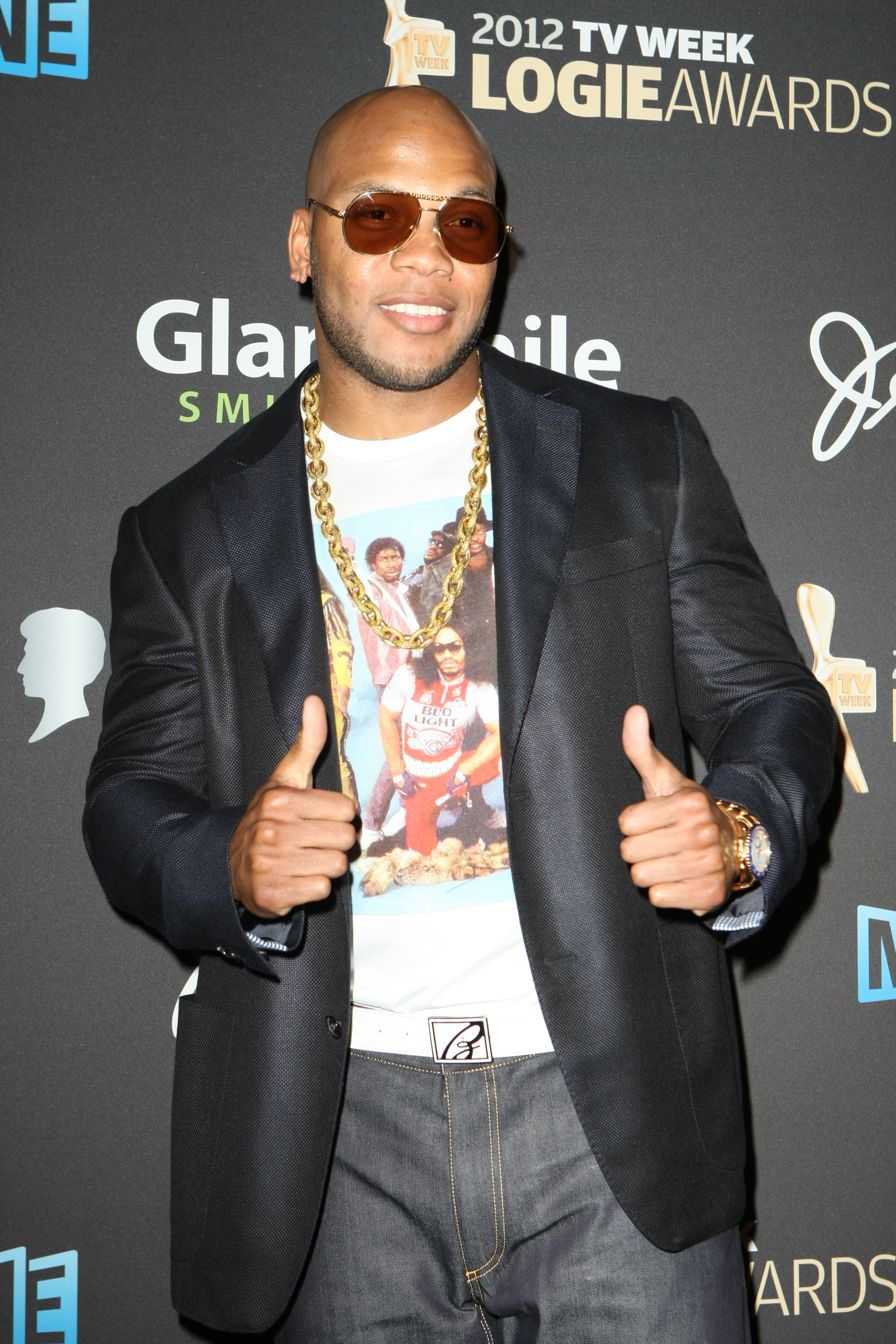
All of rapper Flo Rida's singles off of Wild Ones are within the top 20, except "I Cry", which was not on the Year-End chart but peaked at #6, and would then proceed to be on 2013's Year-End chart, and "Let It Roll", which did not chart on the Hot 100 at all.

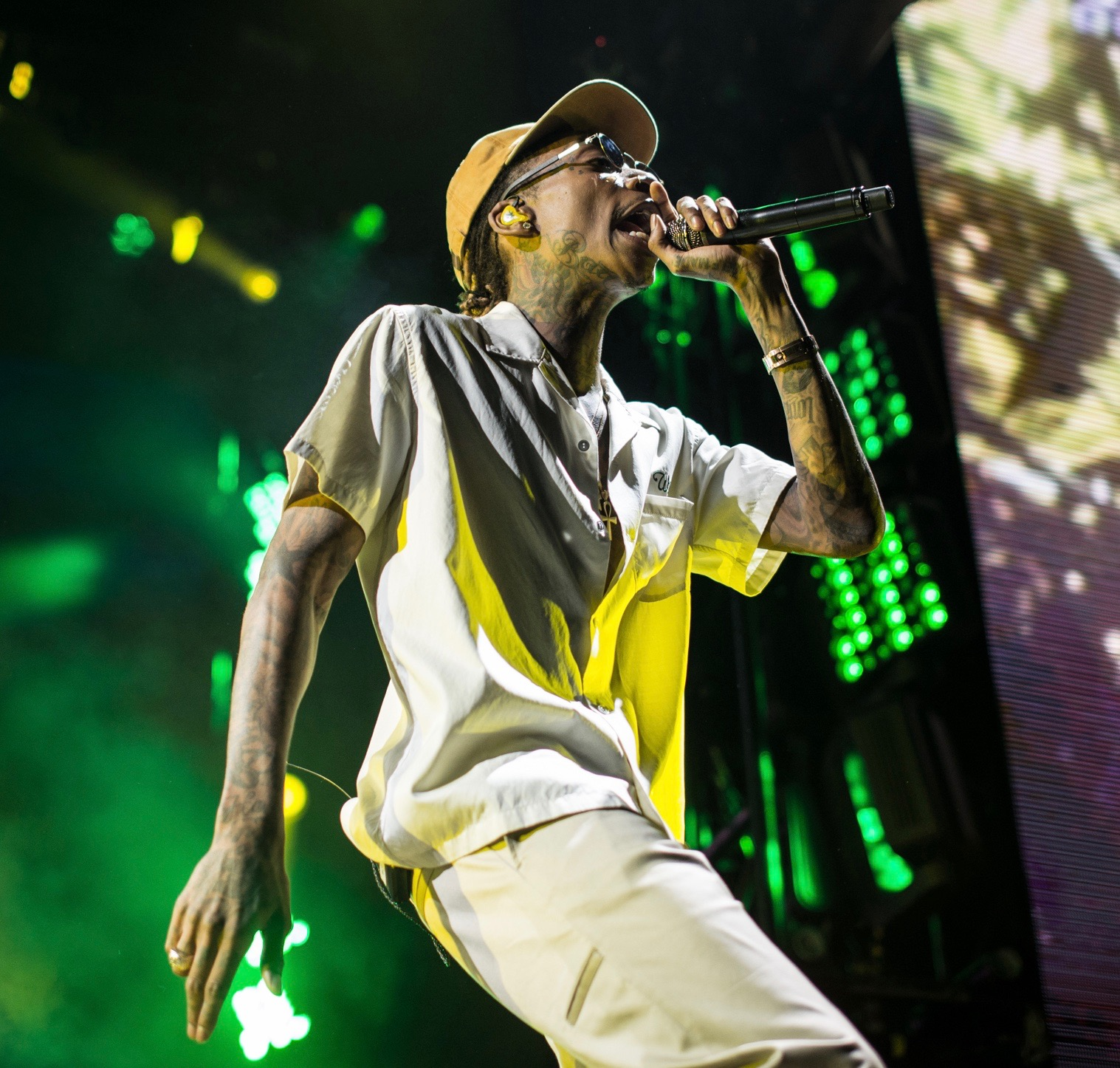
American rapper Wiz Khalifa's feature on Maroon 5's single, "Payphone" came in at number 4 on the list. His singles, "Young, Wild & Free" with Snoop Dogg and Bruno Mars, and "Work Hard, Play Hard" charted at number 32 and number 73 respectively, while his feature on T-Pain's single, "5 O'Clock" made it at number 86.

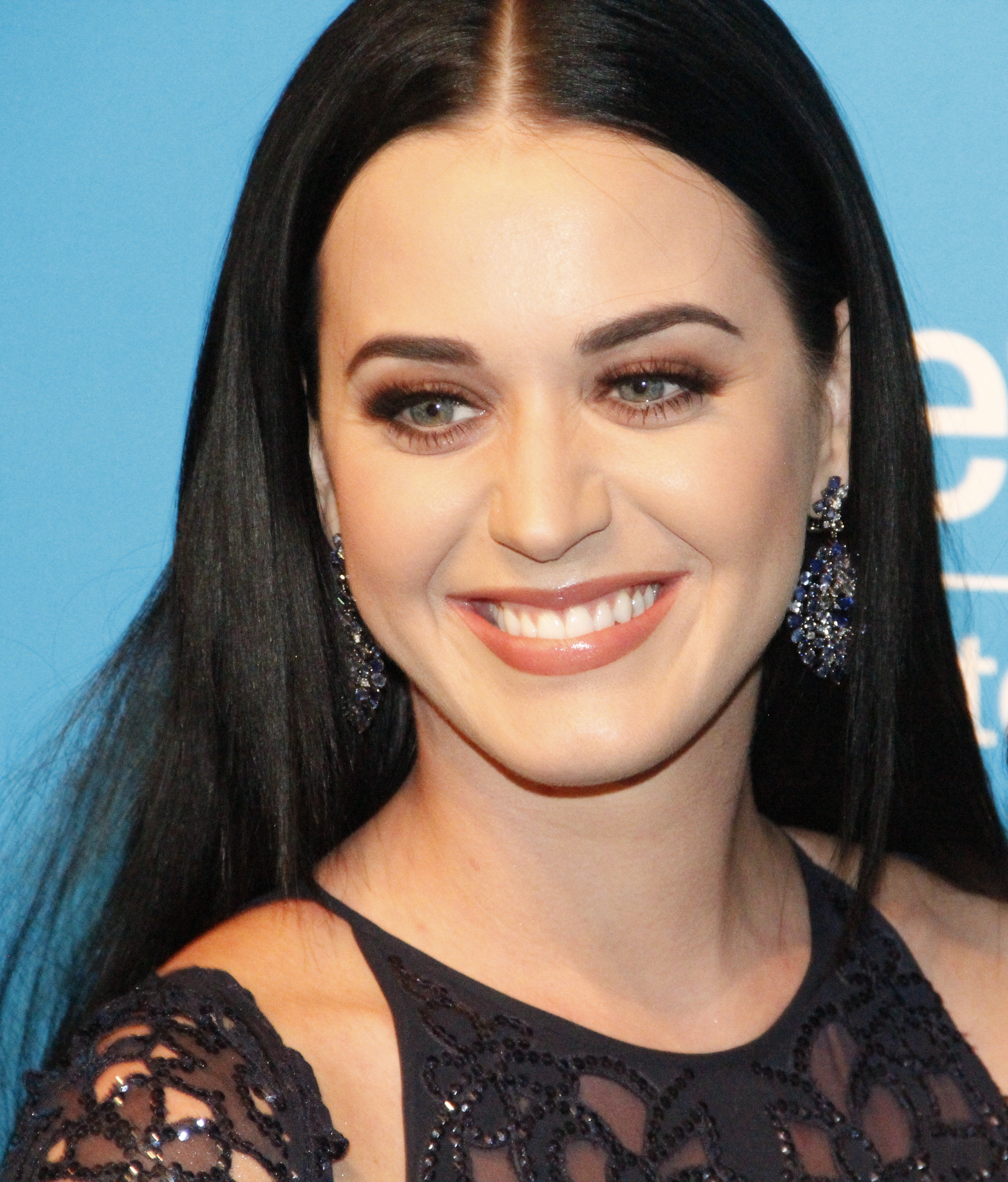
Three of Katy Perry's singles from Teenage Dream: The Complete Confection are in the top 50, with "Wide Awake" at number 15, "Part of Me" at number 31, and "The One That Got Away" at number 41.

Billboard publishes annual lists of songs based on chart performance over the course of a year based on Nielsen Broadcast Data Systems and SoundScan information. For 2012, the list for the top 100 Billboard Hot 100 Year-End songs was published on December 14, calculated with data from December 3, 2011 to November 24, 2012. At the number-one position was Gotye's "Somebody That I Used to Know" featuring Kimbra, which stayed atop the Hot 100 for eight consecutive weeks.

List of songs on Billboard's 2012 Year-End Hot 100 chart
No.	Title	Artist(s)
1	"Somebody That I Used to Know"	Gotye featuring Kimbra
2	"Call Me Maybe"	Carly Rae Jepsen
3	"We Are Young"	Fun featuring Janelle Monáe
4	"Payphone"	Maroon 5 featuring Wiz Khalifa
5	"Lights"	Ellie Goulding
6	"Glad You Came"	The Wanted
7	"Stronger (What Doesn't Kill You)"	Kelly Clarkson
8	"We Found Love"	Rihanna featuring Calvin Harris
9	"Starships"	Nicki Minaj
10	"What Makes You Beautiful"	One Direction
11	"Wild Ones"	Flo Rida featuring Sia
12	"Set Fire to the Rain"	Adele
13	"Sexy and I Know It"	LMFAO
14	"Some Nights"	Fun
15	"Wide Awake"	Katy Perry
16	"Good Feeling"	Flo Rida
17	"Whistle"	Flo Rida
18	"One More Night"	Maroon 5
19	"Drive By"	Train
20	"The Motto"	Drake featuring Lil Wayne
21	"Where Have You Been"	Rihanna
22	"Everybody Talks"	Neon Trees
23	"Take Care"	Drake featuring Rihanna
24	"Titanium"	David Guetta featuring Sia
25	"I Won't Give Up"	Jason Mraz
26	"It Will Rain"	Bruno Mars
27	"Mercy"	Kanye West, Big Sean, Pusha T and 2 Chainz
28	"Boyfriend"	Justin Bieber
29	"Party Rock Anthem"	LMFAO featuring Lauren Bennett and GoonRock
30	"Too Close"	Alex Clare
31	"Part of Me"	Katy Perry
32	"Young, Wild & Free"	Snoop Dogg and Wiz Khalifa featuring Bruno Mars
33	"We Are Never Ever Getting Back Together"	Taylor Swift
34	"As Long as You Love Me"	Justin Bieber featuring Big Sean
35	"Turn Me On"	David Guetta featuring Nicki Minaj
36	"Moves like Jagger"	Maroon 5 featuring Christina Aguilera
37	"Blow Me (One Last Kiss)"	Pink
38	"Good Time"	Owl City and Carly Rae Jepsen
39	"Give Your Heart a Break"	Demi Lovato
40	"Niggas in Paris"	Jay-Z and Kanye West
41	"The One That Got Away"	Katy Perry
42	"Feel So Close"	Calvin Harris
43	"Someone like You"	Adele
44	"Scream"	Usher
45	"Rack City"	Tyga
46	"Domino"	Jessie J
47	"Gangnam Style"	Psy
48	"International Love"	Pitbull featuring Chris Brown
49	"Home"	Phillip Phillips
50	"Without You"	David Guetta featuring Usher
51	"Ass Back Home"	Gym Class Heroes featuring Neon Hitch
52	"Wanted"	Hunter Hayes
53	"Drunk on You"	Luke Bryan
54	"No Lie"	2 Chainz featuring Drake
55	"Want U Back"	Cher Lloyd
56	"Don't Wake Me Up"	Chris Brown
57	"Dance (Ass)"	Big Sean featuring Nicki Minaj
58	"Springsteen"	Eric Church
59	"Brokenhearted"	Karmin
60	"Not Over You"	Gavin DeGraw
61	"Stereo Hearts"	Gym Class Heroes featuring Adam Levine
62	"Back in Time"	Pitbull
63	"Work Out"	J. Cole
64	"Rumour Has It"	Adele
65	"Let's Go"	Calvin Harris featuring Ne-Yo
66	"Good Girl"	Carrie Underwood
67	"Pontoon"	Little Big Town
68	"Ho Hey"	The Lumineers
69	"Paradise"	Coldplay
70	"Blown Away"	Carrie Underwood
71	"Rolling in the Deep"	Adele
72	"Climax"	Usher
73	"Work Hard, Play Hard"	Wiz Khalifa
74	"Let Me Love You (Until You Learn to Love Yourself)"	Ne-Yo
75	"Pound the Alarm"	Nicki Minaj
76	"Come Over"	Kenny Chesney
77	"Heart Attack"	Trey Songz
78	"Drank in My Cup"	Kirko Bangz
79	"Birthday Cake"	Rihanna featuring Chris Brown
80	"So Good"	B.o.B
81	"50 Ways to Say Goodbye"	Train
82	"Red Solo Cup"	Toby Keith
83	"Love You Like a Love Song"	Selena Gomez & the Scene
84	"Turn Up the Music"	Chris Brown
85	"Die Young"	Kesha
86	"5 O'Clock"	T-Pain featuring Wiz Khalifa and Lily Allen
87	"A Thousand Years"	Christina Perri
88	"Take a Little Ride"	Jason Aldean
89	"You da One"	Rihanna
90	"We Run the Night"	Havana Brown featuring Pitbull
91	"It's Time"	Imagine Dragons
92	"Cashin' Out"	Cash Out
93	"I Don't Want This Night to End"	Luke Bryan
94	"Diamonds"	Rihanna
95	"Hard to Love"	Lee Brice
96	"Somethin' 'Bout a Truck"	Kip Moore
97	"Adorn"	Miguel
98	"Fly Over States"	Jason Aldean
99	"Even If It Breaks Your Heart"	Eli Young Band
100	"Burn It Down"	Linkin Park

== See also ==
- 2012 in American music
- Billboard Year-End Hot R&B/Hip-Hop Songs of 2012
- Billboard Year-End Hot Rap Songs of 2012
- List of Billboard Hot 100 number-one singles of 2012
- List of Billboard Hot 100 top 10 singles in 2012
