= List of awards and nominations received by Future =

Future awards and nominations
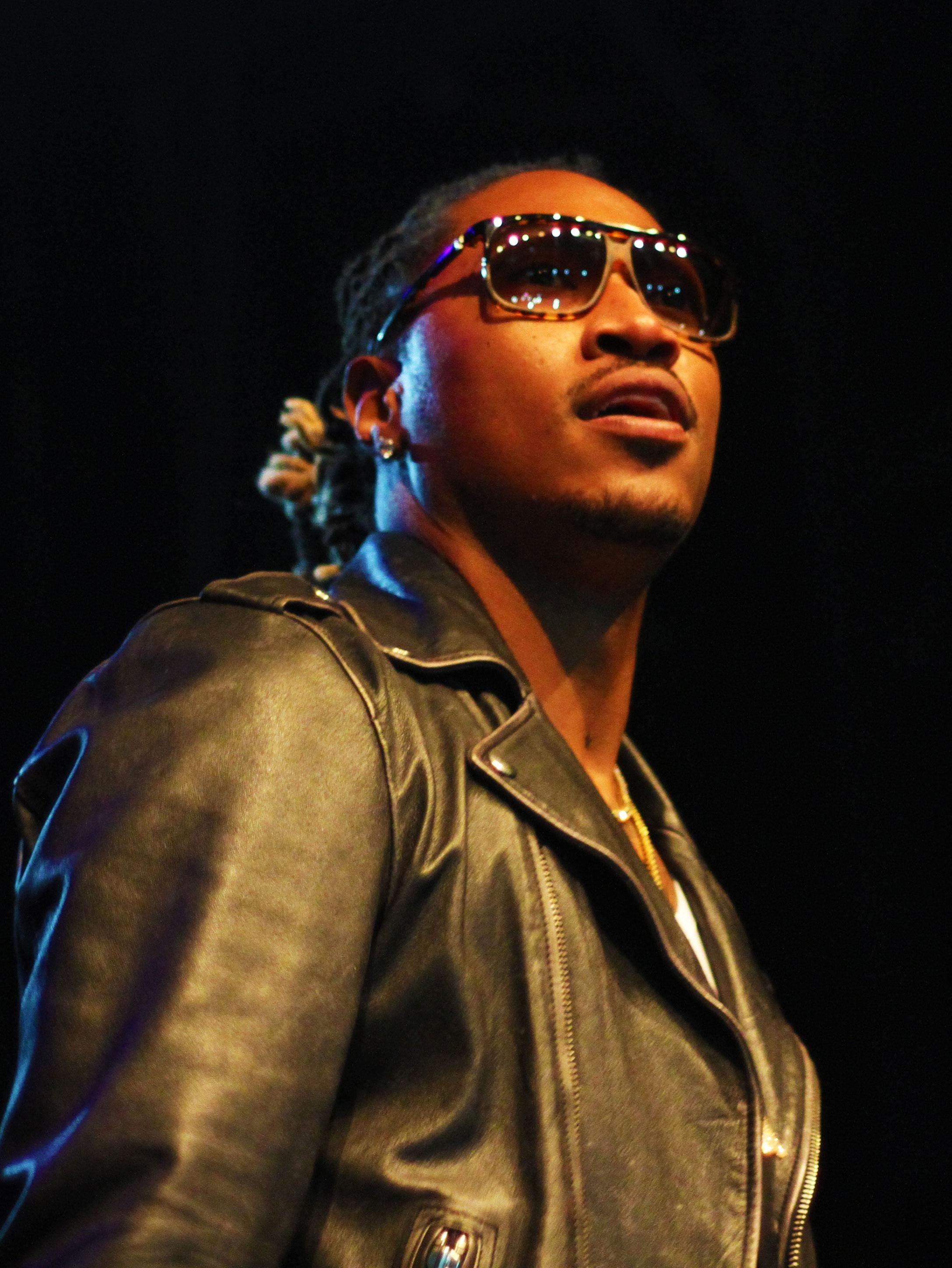
- Future in 2014
Awards and nominations
Award	Wins	Nominations
MTV VMA	0	11
American Music Awards	1	7
BET Awards	1	15
BET Hip Hop Awards	5	44
Grammy Awards	3	15
MTV VMAs	0	5

Totals (Note: Certain award groups do not simply award one winner. They acknowledge several different recipients, have runners-up, and have third place. Since this is a specific recognition and is different from losing an award, runner-up mentions are considered wins in this award tally. For simplification and to avoid errors, each award in this list has been presumed to have had a prior nomination.)
- Wins: 10
- Nominations: 89

This is a list of awards and nominations received by American rapper Future.

He earned his first Grammy in a tie for Best Rap Performance at the 2019 Grammy Awards. He also has received numerous awards and nominations throughout his career as a rapper and musician. Drake's 2016 album Views, which includes a song featuring Future, was nominated for Album of the Year at the 2017 Grammy Awards. Future's frequent collaboration with Drake has won him an award of Best Group at the BET Awards in 2016. He has also won the award for Best Mixtape (2015) and Best Club Banger (2014) at the BET Hip Hop Awards for his mixtape 56 Nights and song "Move That Dope" respectively. His music video for the song "DnF" with P Reign and Drake has won him the Best Hip Hop Video award at the Much Music Video Awards in 2015. Future has received many nominations at the BET Awards and BET Hip Hop Awards from 2011 until 2017, and at the MTV Awards and Billboard Music Awards.

== Awards and nominations ==
Award	Year	Work	Category	Result	Ref.
African Entertainment Awards USA	2022	"Wait for U" (with Drake and Tems)	Best Collaboration	Nominated	
American Music Awards	2016	Himself	Favorite Rap/Hip-Hop Artist	Nominated	
American Music Awards	2016	What a Time to Be Alive (with Drake)	Favorite Rap/Hip-Hop Album	Nominated	
American Music Awards	2020	"Life Is Good" (with Drake)	Favorite Music Video	Nominated	
American Music Awards	2022	Himself	Favorite Male Hip-Hop Artist	Nominated	
American Music Awards	2022	I Never Liked You	Favorite Hip Hop Album	Nominated	
American Music Awards	2022	"Wait for U" (with Drake and Tems)	Collaboration of the Year	Nominated	
American Music Awards	2022	"Wait for U" (with Drake and Tems)	Favorite Hip-Hop Song	Won	
BET Awards	2012	Himself	Best New Artist	Nominated	
BET Awards	2013	Himself	Best Male Hip-Hop Artist	Nominated	
BET Awards	2014	Himself	Best Male Hip-Hop Artist	Nominated	
BET Awards	2016	Himself	Best Male Hip-Hop Artist	Nominated	
BET Awards	2016	"Where Ya At" (with Drake)	Best Collaboration	Nominated	
BET Awards	2016	"Where Ya At" (with Drake)	Coca-Cola Viewer's Choice	Nominated	
BET Awards	2016	Future and Drake	Best Group	Won	
BET Awards	2017	Himself	Best Male Hip-Hop Artist	Nominated	
BET Awards	2018	"Top Off" (with DJ Khaled, Jay-Z and Beyoncé)	Best Collaboration	Nominated	
BET Awards	2020	Himself	Best Male Hip Hop Artist	Nominated	
BET Awards	2020	"Life is Good" (with Drake)	Best Collaboration	Nominated	
BET Awards	2020	"Life is Good" (with Drake)	Coca-Cola Viewer's Choice	Nominated	
BET Awards	2022	Himself	Best Male Hip Hop Artist	Nominated	
BET Awards	2022	"Way 2 Sexy" (with Drake & Young Thug)	Best Collaboration	Nominated	
BET Awards	2022	"Way 2 Sexy" (with Drake & Young Thug)	Video of the Year	Nominated	
BET Hip Hop Awards	2011	"Racks" (with YC Worldwide)	Best Club Banger	Nominated	
BET Hip Hop Awards	2012	"Same Damn Time"	Best Club Banger	Nominated	
BET Hip Hop Awards	2013	"Bugatti" (with Ace Hood and Rick Ross)	Best Club Banger	Nominated	
BET Hip Hop Awards	2013	"Bugatti" (with Ace Hood and Rick Ross)	Best Featured Verse	Nominated	
BET Hip Hop Awards	2013	"Bugatti" (with Ace Hood and Rick Ross)	Best Collabo, Duo or Group	Nominated	
BET Hip Hop Awards	2014	"Move That Dope" (with Pharrell, Pusha T and Casino)	Best Collabo, Duo or Group	Nominated	
BET Hip Hop Awards	2014	"Move That Dope" (with Pharrell, Pusha T and Casino)	Best Club Banger	Won	
BET Hip Hop Awards	2014	"Move That Dope" (with Pharrell, Pusha T and Casino)	Best Hip Hop Video	Nominated	
BET Hip Hop Awards	2014	"Move That Dope" (with Pharrell, Pusha T and Casino)	People's Champ Award	Nominated	
BET Hip Hop Awards	2014	Honest	Album of the Year	Nominated	
BET Hip Hop Awards	2014	Himself	MVP of the Year	Nominated	
BET Hip Hop Awards	2015	Himself	MVP of the Year	Nominated	
BET Hip Hop Awards	2015	"Fuck Up Some Commas"	Best Club Banger	Nominated	
BET Hip Hop Awards	2015	"Fuck Up Some Commas"	People's Champ Award	Nominated	
BET Hip Hop Awards	2015	56 Nights	Best Mixtape	Won	
BET Hip Hop Awards	2015	Beast Mode	Best Mixtape	Nominated	
BET Hip Hop Awards	2015	Monster	Best Mixtape	Nominated	
BET Hip Hop Awards	2016	Purple Reign	Best Mixtape	Nominated	
BET Hip Hop Awards	2016	Himself	MVP of the Year	Nominated	
BET Hip Hop Awards	2016	Himself	Best Live Performer	Nominated	
BET Hip Hop Awards	2016	Himself	Hustler of the Year	Nominated	
BET Hip Hop Awards	2016	Himself	Made-You-Look Award	Nominated	
BET Hip Hop Awards	2016	"I Got the Keys" (with DJ Khaled and Jay-Z)	Best Hip Hop Video	Nominated	
BET Hip Hop Awards	2016	"I Got the Keys" (with DJ Khaled and Jay-Z)	Best Collabo, Duo or Group	Nominated	
BET Hip Hop Awards	2016	"Jumpman" (with Drake)	Best Collabo, Duo or Group	Nominated	
BET Hip Hop Awards	2016	DS2	Album of the Year	Nominated	
BET Hip Hop Awards	2017	"Mask Off"	Best Hip Hop Video	Nominated	
BET Hip Hop Awards	2017	"Mask Off"	Single of the Year	Nominated	
BET Hip Hop Awards	2017	Future	Album of the Year	Nominated	
BET Hip Hop Awards	2017	Himself	Made-You-Look Award (Best Hip Hop Style)	Nominated	
BET Hip Hop Awards	2018	"1000" (with N.E.R.D)	Impact Track	Nominated	
BET Hip Hop Awards	2018	Beast Mode 2	Best Mixtape	Nominated	
BET Hip Hop Awards	2020	"Life Is Good" (with Drake)	Best Hip Hop Video	Won	
BET Hip Hop Awards	2020	"Life Is Good" (with Drake)	Best Collaboration	Nominated	
BET Hip Hop Awards	2020	"Roses (Remix)" (with Saint Jhn)	Best Featured Verse	Nominated	
BET Hip Hop Awards	2020	High Off Life	Album of the Year	Nominated	
BET Hip Hop Awards	2020	Himself	Hip Hop Artist of the Year	Nominated	
BET Hip Hop Awards	2021	Future & Drake	Best Duo/Group	Nominated	
BET Hip Hop Awards	2022	I Never Liked You	Hip Hop Album of the Year	Nominated	
BET Hip Hop Awards	2022	"Wait for U" (with Drake & Tems)	Best Hip Hop Video	Nominated	
BET Hip Hop Awards	2022	"Wait for U" (with Drake & Tems)	Best Collaboration	Won	
BET Hip Hop Awards	2022	"Way 2 Sexy" (with Drake & Young Thug)	Best Collaboration	Nominated	
BET Hip Hop Awards	2022	"Way 2 Sexy" (with Drake & Young Thug)	Best Hip Hop Video	Nominated	
BET Hip Hop Awards	2022	Himself	Hip Hop Artist of the Year	Nominated	
Billboard Music Awards	2016	What a Time to Be Alive (with Drake)	Top Rap Album	Nominated	
Billboard Music Awards	2016	Himself	Top Rap Artist	Nominated	
Billboard Music Awards	2017	Himself	Top Rap Artist	Nominated	
Billboard Music Awards	2017	Himself	Top Male Artist	Nominated	
Billboard Music Awards	2017	Himself	Top Rap Tour	Nominated	
Billboard Music Awards	2021	"Life Is Good" (with Drake)	Top Streaming Song	Nominated	
Billboard Music Awards	2022	"Way 2 Sexy" (with Drake & Young Thug)	Top Rap Song	Nominated	
Brit Awards	2017	Future & Drake	International Group	Nominated	
Grammy Awards	2017	Views (as a featured artist)	Album of the Year	Nominated	
Grammy Awards	2019	"King's Dead" (with Jay Rock, Kendrick Lamar, and James Blake)	Best Rap Song	Nominated	
Grammy Awards	2019	"King's Dead" (with Jay Rock, Kendrick Lamar, and James Blake)	Best Rap Performance	Won	
Grammy Awards	2021	"Life Is Good" (with Drake)	Best Music Video	Nominated	
Grammy Awards	2023	"Pushin P" (with Gunna and Young Thug)	Best Rap Performance	Nominated	
Grammy Awards	2023	"Pushin P" (with Gunna and Young Thug)	Best Rap Song	Nominated	
Grammy Awards	2023	"Wait for U" (with Drake and Tems)	Best Rap Song	Nominated	
Grammy Awards	2023	"Wait for U" (with Drake and Tems)	Best Melodic Rap Performance	Won	
Grammy Awards	2023	"Beautiful" (with DJ Khaled and SZA)	Best Melodic Rap Performance	Nominated	
Grammy Awards	2023	I Never Liked You	Best Rap Album	Nominated	
Grammy Awards	2024	"Scientists & Engineers" (with Killer Mike, André 3000 and Eryn Allen Kane)	Best Rap Performance	Won	
Grammy Awards	2025	"Like That" (with Metro Boomin and Kendrick Lamar)	Best Rap Performance	Nominated	
Grammy Awards	2025	"Like That" (with Metro Boomin and Kendrick Lamar)	Best Rap Song	Nominated	
Grammy Awards	2025	"We Still Don't Trust You" (with Metro Boomin and The Weeknd)	Best Melodic Rap Performance	Nominated	
Grammy Awards	2025	"We Don't Trust You" (with Metro Boomin)	Best Rap Album	Nominated	
iHeartRadio Music Awards	2016	Future	Hip-Hop Artist of the Year	Nominated	
iHeartRadio Music Awards	2017	Future	Hip-Hop Artist of the Year	Nominated	
iHeartRadio Music Awards	2018	Future	Hip-Hop Artist of the Year	Nominated	
iHeartRadio Music Awards	2021	"Life Is Good" (with Drake)	Best Lyrics	Nominated	
iHeartRadio Music Awards	2021	"Life Is Good" (with Drake)	Best Music Video	Nominated	
iHeartRadio Music Awards	2021	"Life Is Good" (with Drake)	Hip-Hop Song of the Year	Nominated	
iHeartRadio Music Awards	2022	"Way 2 Sexy" (with Drake and Tems)	Hip-Hop Song of the Year	Nominated	
Much Music Video Awards	2015	"DnF" (with P Reign and Drake)	Best Hip Hop Video	Won	
Much Music Video Awards	2017	Himself	International Artist of the Year	Nominated	
MTV Video Music Awards	2017	"Mask Off"	Best Editing	Nominated	
MTV Video Music Awards	2020	"Life is Good" (with Drake)	Video of the Year	Nominated	
MTV Video Music Awards	2020	"Life is Good" (with Drake)	Best Collaboration	Nominated	
MTV Video Music Awards	2020	"Life is Good" (with Drake)	Best Hip-Hop	Nominated	
MTV Video Music Awards	2022	"Wait for U" (with Drake and Tems)	Best Hip-Hop	Nominated	
MTV Video Music Awards	2022	"Wait for U" (with Drake and Tems)	Song of Summer	Nominated	
MTV Video Music Awards	2022	"Way 2 Sexy" (with Drake and Young Thug)	Video of the Year	Nominated	
MTV Video Music Awards	2022	"Way 2 Sexy" (with Drake and Young Thug)	Best Collaboration	Nominated	
MTV Video Music Awards	2022	"Way 2 Sexy" (with Drake and Young Thug)	Best Art Direction	Nominated	
MTV Video Music Awards	2023	"Superhero" (with Metro Boomin)	Best Hip-Hop	Nominated	
MTV Video Music Awards	2024	"Like That" (with Metro Boomin and Kendrick Lamar)	Song of Summer	Nominated	
MTV Europe Music Awards	2016	Himself	Best Hip Hop	Nominated	
MTV Europe Music Awards	2017	Himself	Best Hip Hop	Nominated	
NAACP Image Awards	2021	"Life Is Good" (with Drake)	Outstanding Hip Hop/Rap Song	Nominated	
People's Choice Awards	2020	"Life Is Good" (with Drake)	Music Video of 2020	Nominated	
People's Choice Awards	2020	"Life Is Good" (with Drake)	Collaboration Song of 2020	Nominated	
Teen Choice Awards	2018	"End Game"(with Taylor Swift and Ed Sheeran)	Choice Collaboration	Nominated	
