= BET Award for Best Collaboration =

American entertainment award category

BET Awards for Best Collaboration
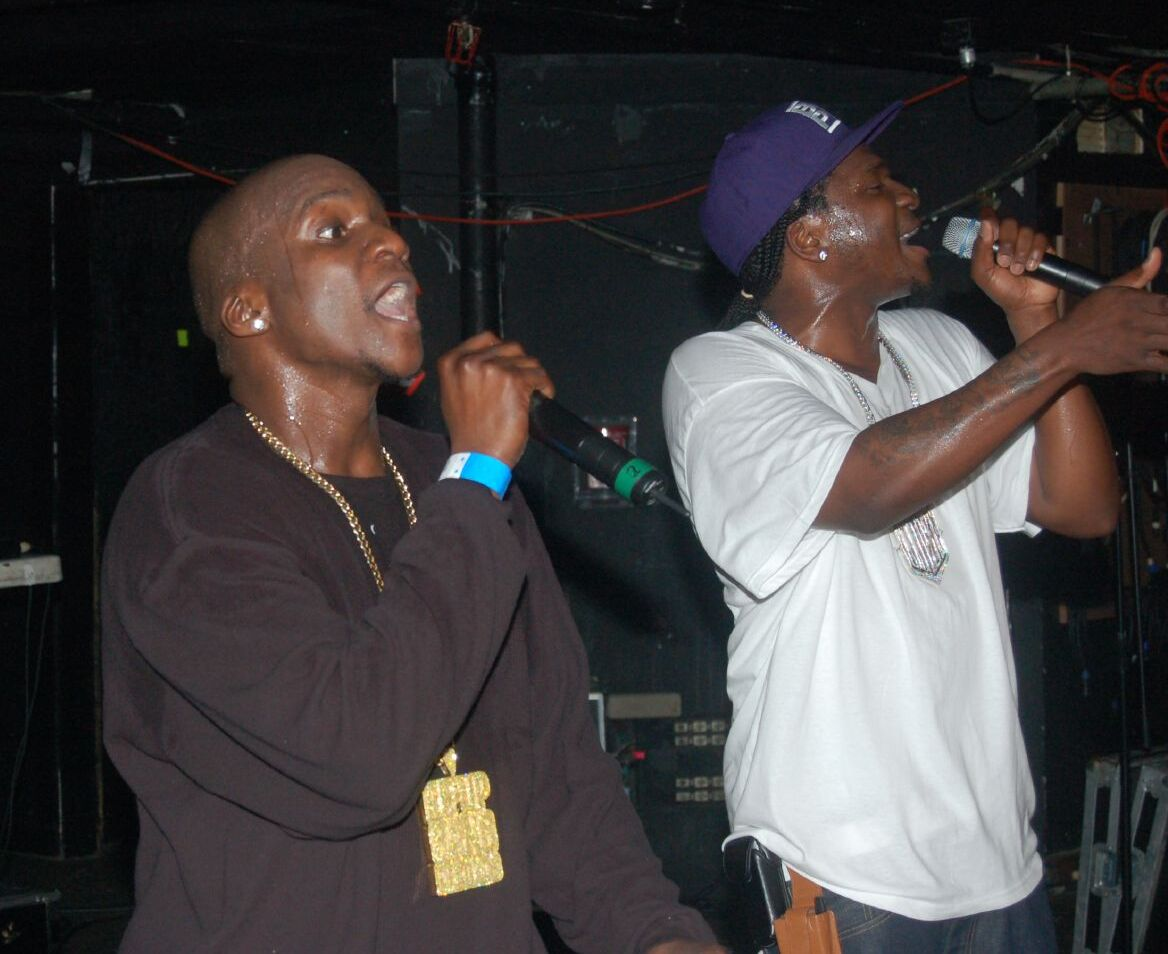
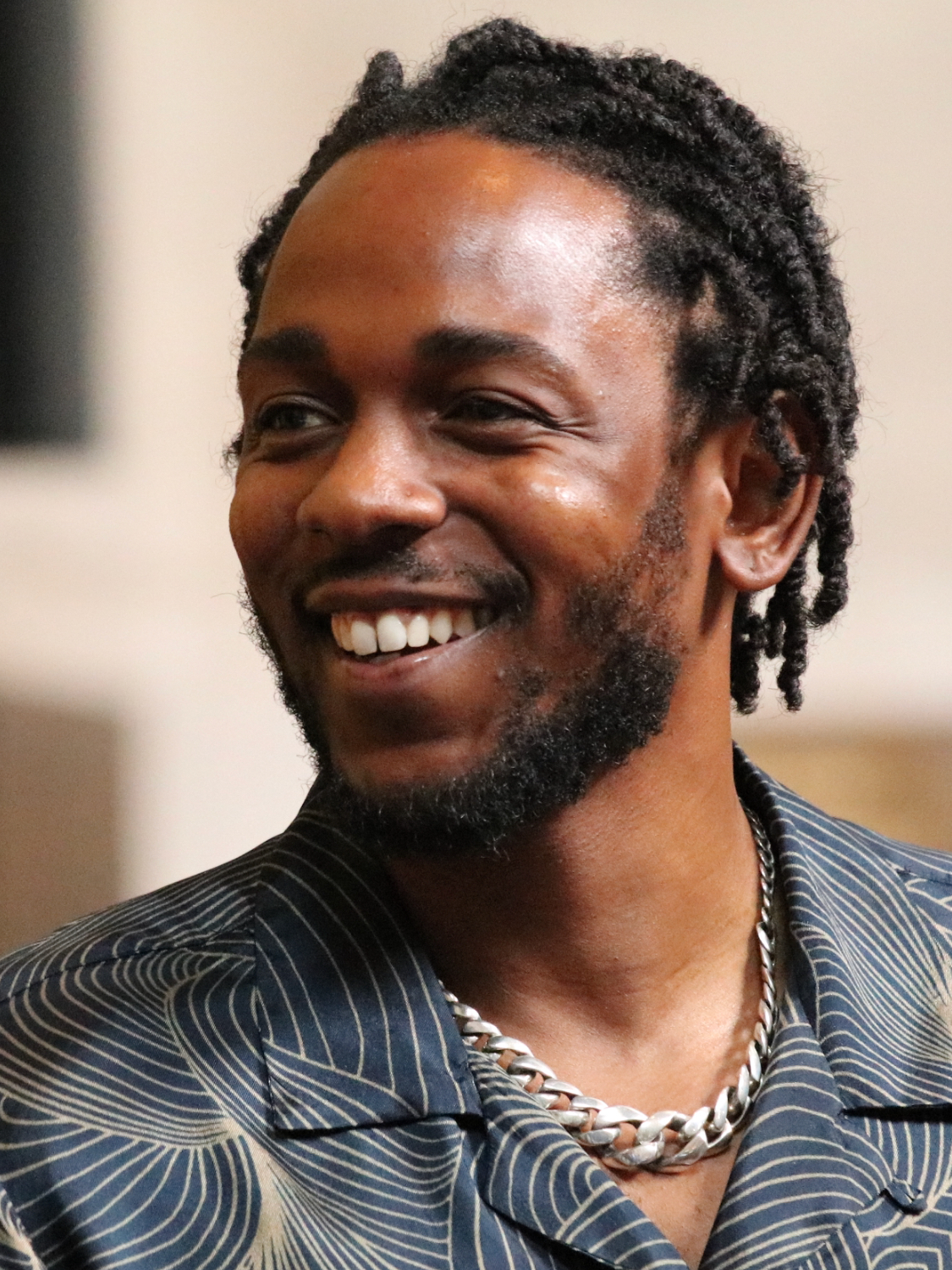
- "Chains & Whips" by Clipse featuring Kendrick Lamar is the most recent recipient
- Country: United States
- Presented by: BET Awards
- First award: 2003
- Currently held by: Clipse featuring Kendrick Lamar – "Chains & Whips" (2026)

Highlights
- Most wins: Drake (5)
- Most nominations: Drake (19)

The BET Award for Best Collaboration honors rap collaborations, R&B collaborations or Rap/Sung collaborations. The award was first introduced in the 2003 ceremony, since its conception, Drake holds the record for most wins in this category with four.

== Winners and nominees ==
Winners are listed first and highlighted in bold.

=== 2000s ===
Year	Artist	Song	Ref
2003
2003	**Snoop Dogg (feat. Pharrell Williams and Charlie Wilson)**	**"Beautiful"**	
2003	Erykah Badu (feat. Common)	"Love of My Life (An Ode to Hip-Hop)"	
2003	Jay-Z (feat. Beyoncé)	"03' Bonnie & Clyde"	
2003	Missy Elliott (feat. Ludacris and Ms. Jade)	"Gossip Folks"	
2003	Nelly (feat. Kelly Rowland)	"Dilemma"	
2004
2004	**Beyoncé (feat. Jay-Z)**	**"Crazy in Love"**	
2004	Outkast (feat. Sleepy Brown)	"The Way You Move"	
2004	Twista (feat. Kanye West and Jamie Foxx)	"Slow Jamz"	
2004	Usher (feat. Lil' Jon and Ludacris)	"Yeah!"	
2004	Pharrell Williams (feat. Jay-Z)	"Frontin'"	
2005
2005	**Ciara (feat. Missy Elliott)**	**"1, 2 Step"**	
2005	Destiny's Child (feat. Lil Wayne and T.I.)	"Soldier"	
2005	The Game (feat. 50 Cent)	"Hate It or Love It"	
2005	Jadakiss (feat. Anthony Hamilton)	"Why"	
2005	Snoop Dogg (feat. Pharrell Williams)	"Drop It Like It's Hot"	
2005	Usher and Alicia Keys	"My Boo"	
2006
2006	**Kanye West (feat. Jamie Foxx)**	**"Gold Digger"**	
2006	Beyoncé (feat. Slim Thug and Bun B)	"Check on It"	
2006	Bow Wow (feat. Ciara)	"Like You"	
2006	Jamie Foxx (feat. Ludacris)	"Unpredictable"	
2006	Busta Rhymes (feat. Papoose, Rah Digga, Missy Elliott, DMX, Mary J. Blige and Lloyd Banks)	"Touch It" (Remix)	
2007
2007	**Ludacris (feat. Mary J. Blige)**	**"Runaway Love"**	
2007	Akon (feat. Snoop Dogg)	"I Wanna Love You"	
2007	Beyoncé (feat. Jay-Z)	"Déjà Vu"	
2007	Beyoncé (feat. Jay-Z)	"Upgrade U"	
2007	Diddy (feat. Keyshia Cole)	"Last Night"	
2008
2008	**Kanye West (feat. T-Pain)**	**"Good Life"**	
2008	Chris Brown (feat. T-Pain)	"Kiss Kiss"	
2008	Keyshia Cole (feat. Lil' Kim and Missy Elliott)	"Let It Go"	
2008	DJ Khaled (feat. Lil Wayne, Fat Joe, T.I., Big Boi, T-Pain and Ludacris)	"I'm So Hood" (Remix)	
2008	Flo Rida (feat. T-Pain)	"Low"	
2009
2009	**Jamie Foxx (feat. T-Pain)**	**"Blame It"**	
2009	Keri Hilson (feat. Lil Wayne)	"Turnin' Me On"	
2009	Jim Jones and Ron Browz (feat. Juelz Santana)	"Pop Champagne"	
2009	T.I. (feat. Rihanna)	"Live Your Life"	
2009	Yung LA (feat. Young Dro and T.I.)	"Ain't I"	

=== 2010s ===
Year	Artist	Song	Ref
2010
2010	**Jay-Z (feat. Alicia Keys)**	**"Empire State of Mind"**	
2010	Beyoncé (feat. Lady Gaga)	"Video Phone"	
2010	B.o.B (feat. Bruno Mars)	"Nothin' On You"	
2010	Drake and Trey Songz	"Successful"	
2010	Drake (feat. Lil Wayne, Kanye West and Eminem)	"Forever"	
2010	Trey Songz (feat. Fabolous)	"Say Aah"	
2011
2011	**Chris Brown (feat. Busta Rhymes and Lil Wayne)**	**"Look at Me Now"**	
2011	Chris Brown (feat. Kevin McCall and Tyga)	"Deuces"	
2011	Rihanna (feat. Drake)	"What's My Name"	
2011	Waka Flocka Flame (feat. Wale and Roscoe Dash)	"No Hands"	
2011	Kanye West (feat. Rihanna)	"All of the Lights"	
2012
2012	**Wale (feat. Miguel)**	**"Lotus Flower Bomb"**	
2012	Beyoncé (feat. J. Cole)	"Party"	
2012	Big Sean (feat. Kanye West and Roscoe Dash)	"Marvin & Chardonnay"	
2012	DJ Khaled (feat. Drake, Rick Ross and Lil Wayne)	"I'm On One"	
2012	Drake (feat. Lil Wayne and Tyga)	"The Motto	
2012	Jay-Z and Kanye West (feat. Otis Redding)	"Otis"	
2013
2013	**ASAP Rocky (feat. Drake, 2 Chainz and Kendrick Lamar)**	**"Fuckin' Problems"**	
2013	2 Chainz (feat. Drake)	"No Lie"	
2013	French Montana (feat. Rick Ross, Drake and Lil Wayne)	"Pop That"	
2013	Kendrick Lamar (feat. Drake)	"Poetic Justice"	
2013	Justin Timberlake (feat. Jay-Z)	"Suit & Tie"	
2013	Kanye West (feat. Big Sean, Pusha T and 2 Chainz)	"Mercy"	
2014
2014	**Beyoncé (feat. Jay-Z)**	**"Drunk in Love"**	
2014	August Alsina (feat. Trinidad James)	"I Luv This Shit"	
2014	Drake (feat. Majid Jordan)	"Hold On, We're Going Home"	
2014	Jay-Z (feat. Justin Timberlake)	"Holy Grail"	
2014	Robin Thicke (feat. T.I. and Pharrell Williams)	"Blurred Lines"	
2014	YG (feat. Young Jeezy and Rich Homie Quan)	"My Nigga"	
2015
2015	**Common and John Legend**	**"Glory"**	
2015	August Alsina (feat. Nicki Minaj)	"No Love" (Remix)	
2015	Big Sean (feat. E-40)	"I Don't Fuck with You"	
2015	Chris Brown (feat. Lil Wayne and Tyga)	"Loyal"	
2015	Chris Brown (feat. Usher and Rick Ross)	"New Flame"	
2015	Mark Ronson (feat. Bruno Mars)	"Uptown Funk"	
2016
2016	**Rihanna (feat. Drake)**	**"Work"**	
2016	Big Sean (feat. Chris Brown and Ty Dolla Sign)	"Play No Games"	
2016	Big Sean (feat. Kanye West and John Legend)	"One Man Can Change the World"	
2016	Future (feat. Drake)	"Where Ya At"	
2016	Nicki Minaj (feat. Beyoncé)	"Feeling Myself"	
2017
2017	**Chance the Rapper (feat. 2 Chainz and Lil Wayne)**	**"No Problem"**	
2017	**Migos (feat. Lil Uzi Vert)**	**"Bad and Boujee"**	
2017	Beyoncé (feat. Kendrick Lamar)	"Freedom"	
2017	Chris Brown (feat. Gucci Mane and Usher)	"Party"	
2017	DJ Khaled (feat. Beyoncé and Jay-Z)	"Shining"	
2017	Rae Sremmurd (feat. Gucci Mane)	"Black Beatles"	
2018
2018	**DJ Khaled (feat. Rihanna and Bryson Tiller)**	**"Wild Thoughts"**	
2018	Bruno Mars (feat. Cardi B)	"Finesse (Remix)"	
2018	Kendrick Lamar (feat. Rihanna)	"LOYALTY."	
2018	Cardi B (feat. 21 Savage)	"Bartier Cardi"	
2018	DJ Khaled (feat. Jay-Z, Future, and Beyoncé)	"Top Off"	
2018	French Montana (feat. Swae Lee)	"Unforgettable"	
2019
2019	**Travis Scott (feat. Drake)**	**"Sicko Mode"**	
2019	21 Savage (feat. J. Cole)	"A Lot"	
2019	Cardi B and Bruno Mars	"Please Me"	
2019	Cardi B, Bad Bunny, and J Balvin	"I Like It"	
2019	H.E.R. (feat. Bryson Tiller)	"Could've Been"	
2019	Tyga (feat. Offset)	"Taste"	

=== 2020s ===
Year	Artist	Song	Ref
2020
2020	**Chris Brown (feat. Drake)**	**"No Guidance"**	
2020	DJ Khaled (feat. Nipsey Hussle and John Legend)	"Higher"	
2020	Future (feat. Drake)	"Life Is Good"	
2020	H.E.R. (feat. YG)	"Slide"	
2020	Megan Thee Stallion (feat. Nicki Minaj and Ty Dolla $ign)	"Hot Girl Summer"	
2020	Wale (feat. Jeremih)	"On Chill"	
2021
2021	**Cardi B (feat. Megan Thee Stallion)**	**"WAP"**	
2021	DaBaby (feat. Roddy Ricch)	"Rockstar"	
2021	DJ Khaled (feat. Drake)	"Popstar"	
2021	Jack Harlow (feat. DaBaby, Tory Lanez and Lil Wayne)	"Whats Poppin (Remix)"	
2021	Megan Thee Stallion (feat. DaBaby)	"Cry Baby"	
2021	Pop Smoke (feat. Lil Baby and DaBaby)	"For the Night"	
2022
2022	**Wizkid (feat. Justin Bieber and Tems)**	**"Essence"**	
2022	DJ Khaled (feat. Lil Baby and Lil Durk)	"Every Chance I Get"	
2022	Baby Keem and Kendrick Lamar	"Family Ties"	
2022	Doja Cat (feat. SZA)	"Kiss Me More"	
2022	Drake (feat. Future and Young Thug)	"Way 2 Sexy"	
2022	Bia (feat. Nicki Minaj)	"Whole Lotta Money (Remix)"	
2023
2023	**Future (feat. Drake and Tems)**	**"Wait for U"**	
2023	Latto and Mariah Carey (feat. DJ Khaled)	"Big Energy (Remix)"	
2023	PinkPantheress and Ice Spice	"Boy's a Liar Pt. 2"	
2023	Chris Brown (feat. Wizkid)	"Call Me Every Day"	
2023	King Combs (feat. Kodak Black)	"Can't Stop Won't Stop"	
2023	Metro Boomin, The Weeknd and 21 Savage	"Creepin'"	
2023	Hitkidd and GloRilla	"F.N.F. (Let's Go)"	
2023	GloRilla and Cardi B	"Tomorrow 2"	
2024
2024	**Lil Durk (feat. J. Cole)**	**"All My Life"**	
2024	Beyoncé (feat. Kendrick Lamar)	"America Has a Problem (Remix)"	
2024	Nicki Minaj and Ice Spice (with Aqua)	"Barbie World"	
2024	Cardi B (feat. Megan Thee Stallion)	"Bongos"	
2024	¥$, Ye and Ty Dolla Sign (feat. Rich the Kid and Playboi Carti)	"Carnival"	
2024	Lola Brooke (feat. Latto and Yung Miami)	"Don't Play with It (Remix)"	
2024	Nicki Minaj (feat. Lil Uzi Vert)	"Everybody"	
2024	Usher, Summer Walker and 21 Savage	"Good Good"	
2024	Drake (feat. Sexyy Red and SZA)	"Rich Baby Daddy"	
2025
2025	**Kendrick Lamar and SZA**	**"Luther"**	
2025	SZA (feat. Kendrick Lamar)	"30 for 30"	
2025	Doechii (feat. JT)	"Alter Ego"	
2025	Teddy Swims (featuring Giveon)	"Are You Even Real"	
2025	Dee Billz (feat. Kyle Richh, Kai Swervo and KJ Swervo)	"Beckham"	
2025	Lil Wayne, Wheezy and Young Thug	"Bless"	
2025	Future, Metro Boomin and Kendrick Lamar	"Like That"	
2025	Tyler, the Creator (feat. GloRilla, Sexyy Red and Lil Wayne)	"Sticky"	
2025	The Weeknd (feat. Playboi Carti)	"Timeless"	
2026
2026	**Clipse (feat. Kendrick Lamar)**	**"Chains & Whips"**	
2026	Cardi B (feat. Jeezy and Latto)	"ErrTime"	
2026	Summer Walker, Latto and Doja Cat	"Go Girl"	
2026	Baby Keem (featuring Kendrick Lamar and Momo Boyd)	"Good Flirts"	
2026	Mariah the Scientist and Kali Uchis	"Is It a Crime"	
2026	Chris Brown (feat. Bryson Tiller and Usher)	"It Depends"	
2026	Metro Boomin (feat. Quavo, Breskii, YK Niece and DJ Spinz)	"Take Me Thru Dere"	
2026	Gunna (feat. Burna Boy)	"WGFT"	

== Multiple wins and nominations ==
=== Wins ===
5 wins

- Drake

3 wins

- Jay-Z
- Kendrick Lamar

2 wins

- 2 Chainz
- Beyoncé
- Chris Brown
- Jamie Foxx
- Lil Wayne
- T-Pain
- Kanye West
- Rihanna
- Tems

=== Nominations ===
19 nominations

- Drake

13 nominations

- Lil Wayne

12 nominations

- Beyoncé

11 nominations

- Jay-Z

10 nominations

- Chris Brown
- Kendrick Lamar
- Kanye West

9 nominations

- DJ Khaled

8 nominations

- Cardi B

6 nominations

- Future
- Nicki Minaj
- Rihanna
- Usher

5 nominations

- Big Sean
- T.I.
- T-Pain

4 nominations

- 2 Chainz
- 21 Savage
- DaBaby
- Missy Elliott
- Jamie Foxx
- Latto
- Bruno Mars
- SZA
- Tyga
- Pharrell Williams

3 nominations

- J. Cole
- GloRilla
- John Legend
- Megan Thee Stallion
- Metro Boomin
- Rick Ross
- Snoop Dogg
- Bryson Tiller
- Ty Dolla Sign
- Wale

2 nominations

- August Alsina
- Baby Keem
- Mary J. Blige
- Busta Rhymes
- Ciara
- Keyshia Cole
- Common
- Roscoe Dash
- Doja Cat
- French Montana
- Gucci Mane
- H.E.R.
- Ice Spice
- Jeezy
- Alicia Keys
- Lil Baby
- Lil Durk
- Lil Uzi Vert
- Ludacris
- Playboi Carti
- Sexyy Red
- Trey Songz
- Tems
- Justin Timberlake
- The Weeknd
- Wizkid
- YG
- Young Thug
