= BET Awards 2013 =

US award ceremony

13th BET Awards
- Date: June 30, 2013
- Location: Microsoft Theater, Los Angeles, California
- Presented by: Black Entertainment Television
- Hosted by: Chris Tucker

Television/radio coverage
- Network: BET

The 13th BET Awards were held at the Nokia Theatre L.A. Live in Los Angeles, California on June 30, 2013. The awards ceremony recognized Americans in music, movies, sports and other fields of entertainment over the past year. Comedian and actor Chris Tucker hosted the event for the first time.

The BET Awards nominations were announced on May 14, 2013, at a press conference on the rooftop of L.A.'s Icon Ultra Lounge, just up the street from the Nokia Theatre, where the BET Awards were staged for the first time. Chris Brown was announced as the first confirmed performer. Charlie Wilson was announced as the Cadillac Lifetime Achievement Award honoree. R. Kelly also performed. The show was the culmination of the cable network's first ever BET Experience, a three-day music and lifestyle fest done in partnership with AEG Live. Brown won the Fandemonium Award for the fourth time in a row, while Nicki Minaj won Best Female Hip-Hop Artist, making history as the first female rapper to win the award four consecutive times. Olympic gold medalist Gabrielle Douglas received the YoungStars Award.

== Nominations ==
Tamar Braxton and Kendrick Lamar announced the nominations. Drake lead with 12 nods, followed by Lamar and 2 Chainz tied with eight nods. A$AP Rocky had five with Jay-Z, while Justin Timberlake and Miguel tied with four. Drake was nominated five times for the top prize, Video of the Year. His hit single "Started from the Bottom" and "HYFR" competed with his collaborations with 2 Chainz ("No Lie"), Lamar ("Poetic Justice"), and A$AP Rocky ("Problems"). The Video of the Year award had 10 nominees for the first time ever, including Justin Timberlake's "Suit & Tie", Kanye West's "Mercy", Miguel's "Adorn", Rihanna's "Diamonds" and Macklemore & Ryan Lewis' "Thrift Shop".

With her eighth nomination, Beyoncé tied Mary J. Blige for the most nominations received for Best Female R&B Artist.

== BET Experience ==
BET revealed a deal with Anschutz Entertainment Group that would bring the show to the $2.5-billion L.A. Live complex in 2013. "It allows us to take the show to the next level," said Debra Lee, chairman and chief executive of BET. "We are making more opportunities for advertisers and taking it to a level that can get more consumers involved. In addition to concerts, comedy shows and the new home of the BET Awards, the BET Experience 3-day weekend featured "106 & Park" LIVE, BET Fan Fest, film screenings, BET Revealed seminars, BET Grammy Museum exhibit, various social events and celebrity appearances. BET Experience teamed with the BET Awards broadcasting live from Nokia Theatre L.A. Live on June 30, 2013.

== Winners and nominees ==
Video of the Year	Video Director of the Year
"Started from the Bottom" – Drake; "No Lie" – 2 Chainz feat. Drake; "Problems" – A$AP Rocky feat. Drake, 2 Chainz & Kendrick Lamar; "HYFR" – Drake feat. Lil Wayne; "Poetic Justice" – Kendrick Lamar feat. Drake; "Thrift Shop" – Macklemore & Ryan Lewis feat. Wanz; "Adorn" – Miguel; "Diamonds" – Rihanna; "Suit & Tie" – Justin Timberlake feat. Jay-Z; "Mercy" – Kanye West feat. Big Sean, Pusha T & 2 Chainz	Benny Boom; A$AP Rocky & Sam Lecca; Director X; Dre Films; Hype Williams
Best Male R&B Artist	Best Female R&B Artist
Miguel; Usher; Chris Brown; Bruno Mars; Justin Timberlake	Rihanna; Beyoncé; Tamar Braxton; Alicia Keys; Elle Varner
Best Female Hip-Hop Artist	Best Male Hip-Hop Artist
Azealia Banks; Eve; Nicki Minaj; Rasheeda; Rye Rye	2 Chainz; A$AP Rocky; Drake; Future; Kendrick Lamar
Best Collaboration	Best New Artist
"No Lie" – 2 Chainz feat. Drake; "Problems" – A$AP Rocky feat. Drake, 2 Chainz & Kendrick Lamar; "Pop That – French Montana" feat. Rick Ross, Drake & Lil Wayne; "Poetic Justice" – Kendrick Lamar feat. Drake; "Suit & Tie – Justin Timberlake" feat. Jay-Z; "Mercy" – Kanye West feat. Big Sean, Pusha T & 2 Chainz	Azealia Banks; Joey Badass; Kendrick Lamar; Trinidad James; The Weeknd
Best Group	Coca-Cola Viewer's Choice
Macklemore & Ryan Lewis; Mary Mary; Mindless Behavior; Slaughterhouse; The Throne	"Problems" – A$AP Rocky feat. Drake, 2 Chainz & Kendrick Lamar; "Started from the Bottom" – Drake; "Swimming Pools (Drank)" – Kendrick Lamar; "Adorn" – Miguel; "Diamonds" – Rihanna; Suit & Tie – Justin Timberlake feat. Jay-Z
YoungStars Award	Centric Award
Gabrielle Douglas; Jacob Latimore; Keke Palmer; Jaden Smith; Quvenzhané Wallis	Tamar Braxton; Fantasia; Miguel; Nas; Charlie Wilson
Best Actress	Best Actor
Angela Bassett; Halle Berry; Taraji P. Henson; Gabrielle Union; Kerry Washington	Don Cheadle; Common; Jamie Foxx; Samuel L. Jackson; Denzel Washington
Best Movie	Best Gospel Artist
Beasts of the Southern Wild; Django Unchained; Something from Nothing: The Art of Rap; Sparkle; Think Like a Man	Deitrick Haddon; Lecrae; Tamela Mann; Mary Mary; Marvin Sapp
Subway Sportswoman of the Year	Subway Sportsman of the Year
Gabrielle Douglas; Brittney Griner; Candace Parker; Serena Williams; Venus Williams	Victor Cruz; Ray Lewis; Kevin Durant; Robert Griffin III; LeBron James
Best International Act: Africa	Best International Act: United Kingdom
2face Idibia (Nigeria); Toya Delazy (South Africa); Donald (South Africa); Ice Prince (Nigeria); R2Bees (Ghana); Goodlyfe Crew (Uganda)	Marsha Ambrosius; Estelle; Labrinth; Emeli Sandé; Rita Ora; Wiley
BET Lifetime Achievement Award	BET Humanitarian Award
Charlie Wilson	Dwyane Wade

== Presenters ==
- Jamie Foxx
- Angela Bassett
- Gabrielle Union
- Wayne Brady
- Paula Patton
- La La Anthony
- Taraji P. Henson
- Lauren London
- Morris Chestnut
- Nelly
- Nia Long
- Nick Cannon
- Queen Latifah
- Sanaa Lathan
- Terrence Howard
- Terrence Jenkins
- Trey Songz
- Brandy
- Quvenzhané Wallis
- Boris Kodjoe
- Bobby Brown
- Don Cheadle
- Derek Luke
- Kevin Hart
- Duane Martin
- Cedric the Entertainer
- Gabrielle Douglas
- J. B. Smoove
- Forest Whitaker

== Performers ==
=== 106 & Park Pre-Show ===
- Young Marqus
- Jacob Latimore
- Ace Hood
- Trinidad James
- French Montana
- Schoolboy Q
- Problem
- K.Michelle

=== Main Show ===
- Chris Brown - "Fine China" / "Don't Think They Know" / "Love More" (with Nicki Minaj)
- Robin Thicke - "Blurred Lines" (with Pharrell Williams and T.I.)
- Kendrick Lamar - "m.A.A.d city" / "Bitch, Don't Kill My Vibe" (with Erykah Badu)
- R. Kelly - Medley: "When a Woman's Fed Up", "Bump n' Grind", "Ignition", "I Wish", and "My Story"
- Mariah Carey - "#Beautiful" (with Miguel and Young Jeezy)
- Young Jeezy - "R.I.P"
- Miguel - "How Many Drinks?" (with Kendrick Lamar)
- A Tribute to Charlie Wilson
  - India.Arie - "There Goes My Baby"
  - Jamie Foxx - "Yearning for Your Love"
  - Stevie Wonder - "Burn Rubber on Me (Why You Wanna Hurt Me)"
  - Justin Timberlake - "Charlie, Last Name, Wilson"
- Charlie Wilson - Lifetime Achievement Award performance - "You Are"
  - Snoop Dogg - "Beautiful" (with Charlie Wilson and Pharrell Williams) and "Signs" with (Charlie Wilson and Justin Timberlake)
  - Charlie Wilson - "You Dropped a Bomb on Me" (with Justin Timberlake and Snoop Dogg) and "Outstanding" (with Pharrell Williams, Justin Timberlake, and Snoop Dogg)
- J. Cole - "Crooked Smile" / "Power Trip" (with Miguel)
- Tamela Mann - "Take Me To The King" (with Kirk Franklin)
- Ciara - "I'm Out" (with Nicki Minaj) / "Body Party"
- Surprise Reggae Tribute
  - Dawn Penn - "You Don't Love Me (No, No, No)"
  - Chaka Demus & Pliers - "Murder She Wrote" (with Elephant Man)
  - Beenie Man - "Who Am I (Sim Simma)" (with Elephant Man)
  - Elephant Man - "Pon De River" (with Beenie Man)
- 2 Chainz - "Feds Watching"
- A$AP Rocky - "Problems" (with 2 Chainz and Kendrick Lamar)
- Janelle Monáe - "Q.U.E.E.N." (with Erykah Badu)
