= List of number-one R&B/hip-hop songs of 2012 (U.S.) =

These are the Billboard Hot R&B/Hip-Hop Songs chart number-one singles of 2012.

On October 20, 2012, Billboard relaunched many of its charts by incorporating the same methodology used for determining the rankings on the Billboard Hot 100 by a combination of sales, airplay, and streaming activity. Included in those changes were the R&B/Hip-Hop Songs, Rap Songs, and R&B/Hip-Hop Airplay charts, as well as the introduction of the R&B Songs chart. The R&B and Rap Songs charts serve as distillations of the overall R&B/Hip-Hop Songs chart and are aimed to highlight the differences between R&B and rap titles.

== Chart history ==
Issue date	Song	Artist(s)	Ref.
January 7	"Lotus Flower Bomb"	Wale featuring Miguel	
January 14	"Lotus Flower Bomb"	Wale featuring Miguel	
January 21	"Lotus Flower Bomb"	Wale featuring Miguel	
January 28	"Lotus Flower Bomb"	Wale featuring Miguel	
February 4	"Make Me Proud"	Drake featuring Nicki Minaj	
February 11	"Make Me Proud"	Drake featuring Nicki Minaj	
February 18	"Make Me Proud"	Drake featuring Nicki Minaj	
February 25	"The Motto"	Drake featuring Lil Wayne	
March 3	"The Motto"	Drake featuring Lil Wayne	
March 10	"Love on Top" †	Beyoncé	
March 17	"Love on Top" †	Beyoncé	
March 24	"Love on Top" †	Beyoncé	
March 31	"Love on Top" †	Beyoncé	
April 7	"Love on Top" †	Beyoncé	
April 14	"Love on Top" †	Beyoncé	
April 21	"Love on Top" †	Beyoncé	
April 28	"Climax"	Usher	
May 5	"Climax"	Usher	
May 12	"Climax"	Usher	
May 19	"Climax"	Usher	
May 26	"Climax"	Usher	
June 2	"Climax"	Usher	
June 9	"Climax"	Usher	
June 16	"Climax"	Usher	
June 23	"Climax"	Usher	
June 30	"Climax"	Usher	
July 7	"Mercy"	Kanye West featuring Big Sean, Pusha T, & 2 Chainz	
July 14	"Climax"	Usher	
July 21	"Mercy"	Kanye West featuring Big Sean, Pusha T, & 2 Chainz	
July 28	"Mercy"	Kanye West featuring Big Sean, Pusha T, & 2 Chainz	
August 4	"Mercy"	Kanye West featuring Big Sean, Pusha T, & 2 Chainz	
August 11	"Mercy"	Kanye West featuring Big Sean, Pusha T, & 2 Chainz	
August 18	"No Lie"	2 Chainz featuring Drake	
August 25	"No Lie"	2 Chainz featuring Drake	
September 1	"No Lie"	2 Chainz featuring Drake	
September 8	"No Lie"	2 Chainz featuring Drake	
September 15	"No Lie"	2 Chainz featuring Drake	
September 22	"Adorn"	Miguel	
September 29	"Adorn"	Miguel	
October 6	"Adorn"	Miguel	
October 13	"Adorn"	Miguel	
October 20	"Diamonds"	Rihanna	
October 27	"Diamonds"	Rihanna	
November 3	"Diamonds"	Rihanna	
November 10	"Diamonds"	Rihanna	
November 17	"Diamonds"	Rihanna	
November 24	"Diamonds"	Rihanna	
December 1	"Diamonds"	Rihanna	
December 8	"Diamonds"	Rihanna	
December 15	"Diamonds"	Rihanna	
December 22	"Diamonds"	Rihanna	
December 29	"Diamonds"	Rihanna	

== See also ==
- 2012 in music
- Billboard Year-End Hot R&B/Hip-Hop Songs of 2012
- List of Billboard Hot Rap Songs number-one hits of the 2010s
