= List of Billboard Hot Rap Songs number ones of the 2010s =

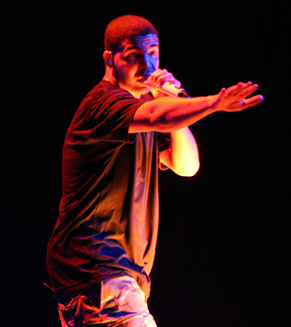
Drake currently holds the record for the most number-one hits on the Billboard rap chart.

Hot Rap Songs is a record chart published by the music industry magazine Billboard that ranks the most popular hip hop songs in the United States. 77 songs topped Hot Rap Songs in the 2010s. The first number-one song of the decade was "Empire State of Mind" by Jay-Z featuring Alicia Keys. In 2012, Drake broke the record for the most Hot Rap Songs number-one songs, previously held by Diddy. During the 2010s, Drake spent the most weeks at number one and attained the most number-one songs on Hot Rap Songs, with 19 chart-toppers spanning 118 weeks. In 2019, "Old Town Road" by Lil Nas X featuring Billy Ray Cyrus spent a record-breaking 20 weeks atop Hot Rap Songs. The final number-one song of the decade on the chart was "Roxanne" by Arizona Zervas.

At the start of the decade the chart was airplay-based, with rankings based on each track's estimated audience as monitored by Nielsen Broadcast Data Systems from a panel of 134 radio stations. In October 2012, Billboard altered the chart's methodology to include digital download sales and streaming data. Under the new methodology, the Rap Songs chart became a distillation of the main Billboard Hot R&B/Hip-Hop Songs chart, which according to the magazine "highlight[s] the differences between pure R&B and rap titles in the overall, wide-ranging R&B/hip-hop field." "Gangnam Style" by Psy was the first number-one song to benefit from these changes, ascending from number 20 to the top spot on the chart dated October 20, 2012.

The changes were met with controversy, with critics arguing that the new chart failed to take into account R&B and rap music's traditionally African-American demographic. Psy's climb to number one in particular was also criticized, with Ebro Darden, program director of New York City radio station WQHT, arguing: "Trust me when I tell you hip-hop does not consider Psy rap. Billboard has pull, but they cannot make people who live hip-hop believe Psy is rap." In response, Billboard chart director Bill Werde defended the changes as a necessary means of reflecting consumer tastes on genre charts. In a 25th anniversary listing of the top 100 songs in the history of Hot Rap Songs based on chart performance, Macklemore and Ryan Lewis' 2013 15-week number-one single "Thrift Shop" was ranked at number one, thanks in part to the new methodology.

== Number-one songs ==
Key
†	Billboard year-end number-one song
↑	Return of a song to number one

Song	Artist	Reached number one	Weeks at number one	Ref.
"Empire State of Mind"	Jay-Z featuring Alicia Keys	November 21, 2009	9	
"BedRock"	Young Money featuring Lloyd	January 23, 2010	9	
"Say Something"	Timbaland featuring Drake	March 27, 2010	4	
"Nothin' on You" †	B.o.B featuring Bruno Mars	April 24, 2010	7	
"Over"	Drake	June 12, 2010	4	
"Your Love"	Nicki Minaj	July 10, 2010	8	
"Love the Way You Lie"	Eminem featuring Rihanna	September 4, 2010	8	
"Fancy"	Drake featuring T.I. and Swizz Beatz	October 30, 2010	1	
"Right Above It"	Lil Wayne featuring Drake	November 6, 2010	5	
"No Hands"	Waka Flocka Flame featuring Wale and Roscoe Dash	December 11, 2010	2	
"Aston Martin Music"	Rick Ross featuring Drake and Chrisette Michele	December 25, 2010	3	
"No Hands" ↑	Waka Flocka Flame featuring Wale and Roscoe Dash	January 15, 2011	3	
"Black and Yellow"	Wiz Khalifa	February 5, 2011	2	
"Moment 4 Life"	Nicki Minaj featuring Drake	February 19, 2011	9	
"Look at Me Now" †	Chris Brown featuring Lil Wayne and Busta Rhymes	April 23, 2011	10	
"My Last"	Big Sean featuring Chris Brown	July 2, 2011	2	
"I'm on One"	DJ Khaled featuring Drake, Rick Ross and Lil Wayne	July 16, 2011	13	
"Headlines"	Drake	October 15, 2011	7	
"Niggas in Paris"	Jay-Z and Kanye West	December 3, 2011	10	
"Make Me Proud"	Drake featuring Nicki Minaj	February 11, 2012	1	
"The Motto" †	Drake featuring Lil Wayne	February 18, 2012	14	
"Drank in My Cup"	Kirko Bangz	May 26, 2012	4	
"Cashin' Out"	Cash Out	June 23, 2012	2	
"Mercy"	Kanye West, Big Sean, Pusha T and 2 Chainz	July 7, 2012	9	
"No Lie"	2 Chainz featuring Drake	September 8, 2012	6	
"Gangnam Style"	Psy	October 20, 2012	8	
"I Cry"	Flo Rida	December 15, 2012	3	
"Gangnam Style" ↑	Psy	January 12, 2013	1	
"Thrift Shop" †	Macklemore and Ryan Lewis featuring Wanz	January 19, 2013	15	
"Can't Hold Us"	Macklemore and Ryan Lewis featuring Ray Dalton	May 4, 2013	14	
"Holy Grail"	Jay-Z featuring Justin Timberlake	August 10, 2013	5	
"Berzerk"	Eminem	September 14, 2013	1	
"Holy Grail" ↑	Jay-Z featuring Justin Timberlake	September 21, 2013	6	
"Rap God"	Eminem	November 2, 2013	1	
"Holy Grail" ↑	Jay-Z featuring Justin Timberlake	November 9, 2013	1	
"The Monster"	Eminem featuring Rihanna	November 16, 2013	9	
"Timber"	Pitbull featuring Kesha	January 18, 2014	15	
"Fancy" †	Iggy Azalea featuring Charli XCX	May 3, 2014	18	
"Anaconda"	Nicki Minaj	September 6, 2014	6	
"Black Widow"	Iggy Azalea featuring Rita Ora	October 18, 2014	5	
"Hot Nigga"	Bobby Shmurda	November 22, 2014	2	
"I Don't Fuck with You"	Big Sean featuring E-40	December 6, 2014	3	
"Only"	Nicki Minaj featuring Drake, Lil Wayne and Chris Brown	December 27, 2014	1	
"I Don't Fuck with You" ↑	Big Sean featuring E-40	January 3, 2015	6	
"Time of Our Lives"	Pitbull and Ne-Yo	February 14, 2015	7	
"Trap Queen"	Fetty Wap	April 4, 2015	3	
"See You Again" †	Wiz Khalifa featuring Charlie Puth	April 25, 2015	15	
"Watch Me (Whip/Nae Nae)"	Silentó	August 8, 2015	9	
"Hotline Bling"	Drake	October 10, 2015	18	
"Me, Myself & I"	G-Eazy and Bebe Rexha	February 13, 2016	1	
"Summer Sixteen"	Drake	February 20, 2016	1	
"Me, Myself & I" ↑	G-Eazy and Bebe Rexha	February 27, 2016	8	
"Panda" †	Desiigner	April 23, 2016	15	
"Don't Mind"	Kent Jones	August 6, 2016	1	
"Panda" † ↑	Desiigner	August 13, 2016	2	
"Sucker for Pain"	Lil Wayne, Wiz Khalifa and Imagine Dragons with Logic and Ty Dolla Sign featuring X Ambassadors	August 27, 2016	1	
"Too Good"	Drake featuring Rihanna	September 3, 2016	3	
"Broccoli"	DRAM featuring Lil Yachty	September 24, 2016	9	
"Black Beatles"	Rae Sremmurd featuring Gucci Mane	November 26, 2016	8	
"Bad and Boujee"	Migos featuring Lil Uzi Vert	January 21, 2017	12	
"iSpy"	Kyle featuring Lil Yachty	April 15, 2017	1	
"Humble" †	Kendrick Lamar	April 22, 2017	4	
"I'm the One"	DJ Khaled featuring Justin Bieber, Quavo, Chance the Rapper and Lil Wayne	May 20, 2017	13	
"Unforgettable"	French Montana featuring Swae Lee	August 19, 2017	2	
"Bodak Yellow (Money Moves)"	Cardi B	September 2, 2017	8	
"Rockstar"	Post Malone featuring 21 Savage	October 28, 2017	15	
"God's Plan" †	Drake	February 3, 2018	11	
"Nice for What"	Drake	April 28, 2018	4	
"This Is America"	Childish Gambino	May 19, 2018	2	
"Nice for What" ↑	Drake	June 2, 2018	2	
"Psycho"	Post Malone featuring Ty Dolla Sign	June 16, 2018	1	
"Nice for What" ↑	Drake	June 23, 2018	1	
"Sad!"	XXXTentacion	June 30, 2018	1	
"I Like It"	Cardi B, Bad Bunny and J Balvin	July 7, 2018	1	
"Nice for What" ↑	Drake	July 14, 2018	1	
"In My Feelings"	Drake	July 21, 2018	11	
"Lucid Dreams"	Juice Wrld	October 6, 2018	1	
"Mona Lisa"	Lil Wayne featuring Kendrick Lamar	October 13, 2018	1	
"Lucid Dreams" ↑	Juice Wrld	October 20, 2018	1	
"Zeze"	Kodak Black featuring Travis Scott and Offset	October 27, 2018	1	
"Sicko Mode"	Travis Scott	November 3, 2018	10	
"Sunflower (Spider-Man: Into the Spider-Verse)"	Post Malone and Swae Lee	January 12, 2019	9	
"Please Me"	Cardi B and Bruno Mars	March 16, 2019	1	
"Sunflower (Spider-Man: Into the Spider-Verse)" ↑	Post Malone and Swae Lee	March 23, 2019	2	
"Wow"	Post Malone	April 6, 2019	1	
"Old Town Road" †	Lil Nas X featuring Billy Ray Cyrus	April 13, 2019	20	
"Truth Hurts"	Lizzo	August 31, 2019	7	
"Highest in the Room"	Travis Scott	October 19, 2019	1	
"Truth Hurts" ↑	Lizzo	October 26, 2019	6	
"Roxanne"	Arizona Zervas	December 7, 2019	4	
