= Up! (LoveRance song) =

"UP!"

Single by LoveRance
- Released: December 13, 2011
- Recorded: 2010
- Genre: Hyphy, dirty rap
- Length: 4:10
- Label: Interscope Records
- Songwriters: Rance Oliver; Curtis Jackson; Sudan Williams
- Producer: Iamsu!

LoveRance singles chronology
"UP!" (2011)	"Akup" (2012)

"UP! (Beat The Pussy Up)" is the debut single by American hip-hop recording artist LoveRance. The song originally featured guest vocals from rappers Iamsu! and Skipper; however, once being re-issued by Interscope Records, the label's executive Larry Jackson placed 50 Cent on the song's commercial remix to replace both rappers.

The song was produced by Iamsu!, who also performs the hook on both versions, the latter of which uncredited. According to Iamsu! himself, the song was originally his, but due to its explicit lyrics and his mother being a teacher, it was instead given to LoveRance as a lead artist.

The artwork for the single's cover is inspired by the promotional artwork from the 1993 film Poetic Justice.

== Music video ==
On June 30, 2011, LoveRance uploaded the video for "UP! (Beat The Pussy Up)" on his YouTube and Vevo account. The music video of the remix on YouTube has received over 7 million views as of April 2024.

== Track listing ==
- Download digital
1. UP! (featuring 50 Cent) — 3:51
- Download digital
1. UP! (featuring Iamsu! and Skipper) — 4:10

== Charts ==
=== Weekly charts ===
Chart (2011–2012)	Peak position
US Billboard Hot 100	46
US Hot R&B/Hip-Hop Songs (Billboard)	3
US Hot Rap Songs (Billboard)	2
US Rhythmic Airplay (Billboard)	9

=== Year-end charts ===
Chart (2012)	Position
US Hot R&B/Hip-Hop Songs (Billboard)	18
US Rap Songs (Billboard)	14
US Rhythmic (Billboard)	42

== Certifications ==
Region	Certification	Certified units/sales
United States (RIAA)	Gold	500,000^{^}
^{^} Shipments figures based on certification alone.
