= Mercy (Kanye West song) =

2012 single by Kanye West

Single by Kanye West featuring Big Sean, Pusha T and 2 Chainz

from the album Cruel Summer
- Released: April 6, 2012
- Recorded: 2011–12
- Genre: Southern hip-hop; trap
- Length: 5:33 (video version); 5:29 (single version); 5:26 (album version)
- Label: GOOD; Def Jam
- Songwriters: Kanye West; Sean Anderson; Terrence Thornton; Tauheed Epps; Michael Williams II; Ross Birchard; Mike Dean; Stepan Taft; James Thomas; Denzie Beagle; Winston Riley; Reggie Williams
- Producers: Lifted; Kanye West; Mike Dean; Mike Will Made It; Anthony Kilhoffer; Hudson Mohawke

Kanye West singles chronology
"No Church in the Wild" (2012)	"Mercy" (2012)	"Cold" (2012)

Big Sean singles chronology
"Dance (Ass)" (2011)	"Mercy" (2012)	"Till I Die" (2012)

Pusha T singles chronology
"What Do You Take Me For?" (2011)	"Mercy" (2012)	"Exodus 23:1" (2012)

2 Chainz singles chronology
"Mercy" (2012)	"No Lie" (2012)

GOOD Music singles chronology
"Mercy" (2012)	"Cold" (2012)

Music video
- "Mercy" on YouTube

"Mercy" (stylized as "Mercy.1" on the album) is a song by American rapper Kanye West featuring fellow American rappers Big Sean, Pusha T, and 2 Chainz. The song was released on April 6, 2012, through GOOD Music and Def Jam Recordings, as the lead single from the compilation album, Cruel Summer (2012). The song's production was handled by Lifted, with additional production from West, Mike Dean, Mike Will Made It, Anthony Kilhoffer, and Hudson Mohawke. The song heavily samples the spoken intro for the dancehall song, "Dust a Sound Boy" by Super Beagle.

"Mercy" received mostly positive reviews from music critics, who commented on the blathering production, the varying quality of the verses, and the wordplay of the individual rappers. The song peaked at number 13 on the US Billboard Hot 100, and peaked at number one on both the US Hot Rap Songs, Hot R&B/Hip-Hop Songs, and Rhythmic Airplay charts. The song has since been certified 7x platinum in the US, as of April 2023. A music video was released on June 6, 2012. The highly stylized video shows a long take of all four rappers featured on the song, with editing to make them appear as if they're disappearing and reappearing behind walls. The video received positive reviews from critics.

West performed his portion of the song at the 2012 Watch the Throne Tour. 2 Chainz, Pusha T, and Big Sean performed the song during Sean's setlist at the 2012 Summer Jam festival. The song was performed by all four rappers at the 2012 BET Awards, with West substituting his verse from "Mercy" with his verses from "Cold" and "New God Flow" (2012). Multiple music magazines ranked "Mercy" as one of the best songs of 2012, and the song later received two nominations at the 55th Grammy Awards for Best Rap Song and Best Rap Performance. West would later use the song on the set lists of The Yeezus Tour (2013–14), Saint Pablo Tour (2016), Free Larry Hoover Benefit Concert (2021), and Ye Live Concert Tour (2026).

== Background and release ==
"Mercy" was first announced by Pusha T on Twitter on April 3, 2012, stating that West's signees were planning a GOOD Music collaborative album. The song was released to the iTunes Store by GOOD Music and Def Jam Recordings during Good Friday on April 6, 2012, after it was premiered by Funkmaster Flex's Hot 97 radio show the previous night. "Mercy" serves as the first official single from Cruel Summer, a compilation album by West's record label, GOOD Music. The release of the song was compared to GOOD Fridays, a music giveaway from West that provided free MP3 downloads every week to anticipate his album My Beautiful Dark Twisted Fantasy in 2010. While "Mercy" was officially released first to the iTunes Store, another GOOD Music single "Cold" was previewed by Flex on April 4, a day before the former's preview.

== Production ==
"Mercy" features Big Sean and Pusha T, rappers both signed to West's GOOD Music, along with 2 Chainz, all delivering a verse each along with West. Reflecting on his collaboration with West, 2 Chainz noted that they had worked together for about a year before the song's release. He recalled contracting West to hear his own verse again, describing the experience as a strong addition to his professional résumé.

The song was produced by Lifted, with additional production from West, Hudson Mohawke, and Anthony Kilhofer. Lifted had produced the beat in November 2011, and his manager was responsible for playing the beat to West, which led to him wanting to work with Lifted. Furthermore, West added additional production with sampling and his rap verse. Both Pusha T and Big Sean recorded their verses in January 2012, with the song mixed and finalized in March. Producer Hit-Boy, known for producing West's "Niggas in Paris" (2011), described the song as a fresh and innovative blend that incorporated trap elements while maintaining a unique sound. He expressed enthusiasm for the result and admitted that he wished he had produced it himself.

== Composition ==
"Mercy"
A 21-second sample featuring Sean's verse and ad-libs from West, over the production of the song.

"Mercy" is a Southern hip-hop song with dancehall influences. Beginning with a sample of the early 1990s dancehall track, "Dust a Sound Boy" by Fuzzy Jones, the song spans a haunting bass track, sparse drums, piano keys, and a Scarface film sample. It plays off a hook (sampled from YB's song "Lambo") about a "two-seat Lamborghini". West's posse references Sarah Palin, Rick James, and Ms. Pac-Man.

Lyrically, Big Sean continues the strip clubs-inspired themes of his earlier single "Dance (Ass)", while Pusha T delivers verses focused on his luxury car collection. West's lines center on his wealth and relationship with models, often used to taunt less successful rappers. Without an overarching concept, 2 Chainz closes the song with a free-associative verse referencing high-end jewelry, designed accessories, and premium marijuana strains. LA Weekly journalist, Brian McManus, noted that the song contains references to suicide doors, which West has previously discussed in his song, "Can't Tell Me Nothing".

== Critical reception ==
"Mercy" received mostly positive reviews from music critics. Josiah Hughes of Exclaim! remarked that the song met expectations with its lavish, cinematic production, slowed-down samples, and aggressive synthesizer elements, also referencing West's distinctive vocal exclamation that had become a signature of his style. Corban Goble of Stereogum described the song as a massive, forceful production in which the featured rappers exchange confident, swagger-filled verse over a hook influence by "syrup-music inspired" Southern rap.

Jayson Rodriguez of XXL observed that while the concept and presentation might seem familiar, the song's execution felt elevated, crediting West for assembling the lineup and delivering a polished result. He noted that the earlier surprise release of "Cold" had been more thrilling in both sound and spectacle. Idolator stated that while the song lands along West's GOOD Fridays singles, it's not as elevated with companions "Good Friday" and "Devil in a New Dress". Kia Makarechi of The Huffington Post commented that although he song offered little lyrical depth, it functioned effectively as a confident display of boastful rap.

=== Accolades ===
In 2012 year-end lists, both Complex and Spin named "Mercy" the best song of 2012. Rolling Stone named the song the 6th best song of 2012. MTV named "Mercy" the seventh best song of 2012. XXL named it one of the top five hip-hop songs of 2012. Billboard named it the third best song of 2012. NME named it the 39th best song of the year. "Mercy" was placed at 31 on Club Fonograma's best songs of 2012 list. MSN listed the song eighth on its best 2012 songs list. It would go on to win Best Hip-Hop Song of the Year at the 2012 Soul Train Music Awards. That same year, the song was featured on the soundtrack for NBA 2K13. In end of the decade best songs of the 2010s lists; Stereogum placed it at 53, Crack listed it at 62, and Uproxx ranked it at 36.

"Mercy" received a total of eight awards and fifteen nominations. At the 54th Annual Grammy Awards, the song was nominated for Best Rap Performance and Best Rap Song. In the 2012 BET Hip Hop Awards, the song was awarded for Reese's Perfect Combo Award and nominated in three other categories, while it was nominated for Video of the Year and Best Collaboration at the BET Awards in 2013. The song also won two of three of its categories at the XXL Awards. Outside of these award ceremonies, "Mercy" received awards from the HipHopDX Awards, Soul Train Music Awards, ASCAP Rhythm & Soul Music Awards, and BMI R&B/Hip-Hop Awards, as well as nominations from the MTV Video Music Awards, Billboard Music Awards, International Dance Music Awards, MTVU Woodie Awards, and World Music Awards.

Year	Organization	Award	Result	Ref.
2012	BET Hip Hop Awards	Best Club Banger	Nominated	
2012	BET Hip Hop Awards	Reese's Perfect Combo Award	Won	
2012	BET Hip Hop Awards	Best Hip-Hop Video	Nominated	
2012	BET Hip Hop Awards	People's Champ Award	Nominated	
2012	MTV Video Music Awards	Best Hip-Hop Video	Nominated	
2012	MTV Video Music Awards	Best Editing	Nominated	
2012	HipHopDX Awards	Collaboration of the Year	Won	
2012	Soul Train Music Awards	Best Hip-Hop Song of the Year	Won	
2013	ASCAP Rhythm & Soul Music Awards	Award Winning R&B/Hip-Hop Songs	Won	
2013	ASCAP Rhythm & Soul Music Awards	Award Winning Rap Songs	Won	
2013	BET Awards	Video of the Year	Nominated	
2013	BET Awards	Best Collaboration	Nominated	
2013	Billboard Music Awards	Top Rap Song	Nominated	
2013	BMI R&B/Hip-Hop Awards	Award Winning Songs	Won	
2013	Grammy Awards	Best Rap Performance	Nominated	
2013	Grammy Awards	Best Rap Song	Nominated	
2013	International Dance Music Awards	Best Rap/Hip Hop/Trap Dance Track	Nominated	
2013	MTVU Woodie Awards	Tag Team Woodie	Nominated	
2013	XXL Awards	Record of the Year	Won	
2013	XXL Awards	Best Video	Nominated	
2013	XXL Awards	Best Posse Cut	Won	
2014	World Music Awards	World's Best Song	Nominated	
2014	World Music Awards	World's Best Music Video	Nominated	

== Commercial performance ==
"Mercy" debuted on the Billboard Hot 100 at position 38, later achieving a peak position of 13. It also peaked at number one on the Hot R&B/Hip-Hop Songs, Hot Rap Songs, and Rhythmic Airplay charts in the United States. By July 2012, it sold one million digital copies, and in May 2018, was ranked as West's 14th biggest success on the Hot 100. Internationally, "Mercy" charted in Australia, Belgium, Canada, France, and the United Kingdom, also charting at number nine on the latter's Hip-Hop/R&B charts.

In the year-end charts of 2012, "Mercy" appeared on four Billboard charts, ranking at number two on Hot Rap Songs, number five on Hot R&B/Hip-Hop Songs, number six on Rhythmic Airplay, and number 27 on the Hot 100. "Mercy" revisited the Hot R&B/Hip-Hop Songs chart for 2013, ranking at number 92. In the decade-end chart of the 2010s for the Hot R&B/Hip-Hop Songs chart, "Mercy" peaked at number 37.

== Music video ==
Big Sean, Kanye West, Pusha T and 2 Chainz standing at the end of the video

West released a black-and-white image of a Lamborghini on his Twitter account, serving as promotion for the video. Directed by Nabil, it was filmed in a university at Qatar Foundation's parking garage in Doha, Qatar, while West was producing his short film, Cruel Summer. On June 6, West "unleashed the deceptively minimalist video" onto his website. The video was shot in a wide aspect ratio, featuring the artists performing in what appears to be a parking garage as the camera pans smoothly across the space. A Lamborghini Gallardo LP560-4 is prominently displayed in the background, adding to the video's sleek aesthetic. Marc Hogan of Spin praised the video for its minimalistic black-and-white visuals, primarily featuring West and his collaborates exuding style and attitude. He highlighted the sequence coinciding with the song's synth lift as the visual peak, noting the moment when two versions of West appear simultaneously as a standout creative choice. Carrie Batton of Pitchfork described the video as a minimalist yet visually striking black-and-white production, notable for its use of leather outfits, keffiyehs, and sharply composed camera angles that enhance its stylish presentation.

== Live performances ==
The song's debut performance was at the O2 Arena in London, during West's Watch the Throne Tour in May 2012, with him performing his portion of the song. Big Sean performed the song with Pusha T and 2 Chainz during his 2012 setlist at Summer Jam, which was described as a "possibly a show-stealing performance". At the 2012 BET Awards in July, all four featured rappers performed the song live, with a stage design that included a Lamborghini model as part of the set. Los Angeles Times critic Randall Roberts observed that the performance reached its peak when West transitioned into his hit "Cold", followed by an improved freestyle on "New God Flow" that ended in a powerful, rhythm-driven breakdown. "Mercy" was later included on the set lists of The Yeezus Tour (2013–14), Saint Pablo Tour (2016), Free Larry Hoover Benefit Concert (2021), and Ye Live Concert Tour (2026).

== Personnel ==
Credits were adapted from Tidal.

- Kanye West – vocals, songwriting, additional production
- Sean Anderson – vocals, songwriting
- Terrence Thornton – vocals, songwriting
- Tauheed Epps – vocals, songwriting
- Lifted – production
- Anthony Kilhoffer – keyboards, recording engineer
- Hudson Mohawke – keyboards, recording engineer
- Michael Williams II – songwriting
- Ross Birchard – songwriting
- Mike Dean – songwriting
- Stepan Taft – songwriting
- James Thomas – songwriting
- Denzie Beagle – songwriting
- Winston Riley – songwriting
- Reggie Williams – songwriting

== Charts ==
=== Weekly charts ===
Chart (2012–13)	Peak position
Australia (ARIA)	60
Belgium (Ultratip Bubbling Under Flanders)	85
Belgium (Ultratop Flanders Urban)	29
Canada Hot 100 (Billboard)	46
France (SNEP)	101
UK Singles (Official Charts)	55
UK Hip Hop/R&B (Official Charts)	9
US Billboard Hot 100	13
US Hot R&B/Hip-Hop Songs (Billboard)	1
US Hot Rap Songs (Billboard)	1
US Rhythmic Airplay (Billboard)	1

=== Year-end charts ===
Chart (2012)	Position
US Billboard Hot 100	27
US Hot R&B/Hip-Hop Songs (Billboard)	5
US Rap Songs (Billboard)	2
US Rhythmic (Billboard)	6

Chart (2013)	Position
US Hot R&B/Hip-Hop Songs (Billboard)	92

=== Decade-end charts ===
Chart (2010–19)	Position
US Hot R&B/Hip-Hop Songs (Billboard)	37

== Certifications ==
Region	Certification	Certified units/sales
Brazil (Pro-Música Brasil)	Gold	30,000^{‡}
Denmark (IFPI Danmark)	Gold	45,000^{‡}
New Zealand (RMNZ)	2× Platinum	60,000^{‡}
United Kingdom (BPI)	Gold	400,000^{‡}
United States (RIAA)	7× Platinum	7,000,000^{‡}
^{‡} Sales+streaming figures based on certification alone.

== See also ==
- List of number-one R&B/hip-hop songs of 2012 (U.S.)
- List of Billboard Hot Rap Songs number ones of the 2010s
