= The Motto (Drake song) =

2011 single by Drake

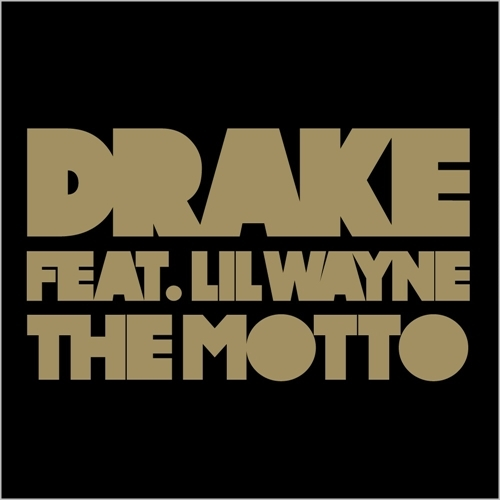

Single by Drake featuring Lil Wayne

from the album Take Care
- Released: November 29, 2011
- Recorded: 2011
- Genre: Hip hop; hyphy; crunk
- Length: 3:02 (Album version); 3:54 (Remix version featuring Tyga)
- Label: Young Money; Cash Money; Republic
- Songwriters: Aubrey Graham; Dwayne Carter; Tyler Williams; Micheal Stevenson (remix)
- Producer: T-Minus

Drake singles chronology
"Mr. Wrong" (2011)	"The Motto" (2011)	"Take Care" (2012)

Lil Wayne singles chronology
"IMA BO$ (remix)" (2011)	"The Motto" (2011)	"Faded" (2012)

Music video
- "The Motto" on YouTube

"The Motto" is a song by Canadian rapper Drake featuring American rapper Lil Wayne. It is a digital iTunes Store bonus track from Drake's second studio album Take Care. It was written as a response to the Nickelback song If Today Was Your Last Day." The Motto" premiered on Power 106 on October 31, 2011. Drake released the song on his OVO blog a day later. It was first played on rhythmic top 40 radio stations on November 29, 2011 as the album's fourth single.

The track has sold over three million copies in the United States. It peaked atop both the US Hot R&B/Hip-Hop Songs and US Rap Songs charts, taking the top spot on the Billboard Year-End Hot Rap Songs of 2012, while also being ranked at number-20 on the Billboard Year-End Hot 100 singles of 2012. "The Motto" was nominated for Best Rap Song at the 55th Grammy Awards. Peaking at number 14, the song is one of the few songs to rank within the top 20 in the year-end chart without reaching the top ten. A music video directed by Lamar Taylor and Hyghly Alleyne was released on YouTube on February 10, 2012 and features cameos from E-40 and Mistah F.A.B.

"The Motto" is best known for popularizing the phrase YOLO, an acronym for You Only Live Once, which is uttered during the song's hook.

== Music video ==
The music video for the remix version featuring American rapper Tyga was filmed in San Francisco, California. It was dedicated to West Coast hip hop Bay Area artist Mac Dre. The original music video for the song features an appearance from Mac Dre's mother Wanda Salvatto.

== Remixes and freestyles ==
- Drake, featuring Lil Wayne & Tyga (Official remix)
- YG, Nipsey Hussle and Snoop Dogg
- Nelly (Released through the mixtape O.E.MO)
- Jeremih
- Mario
- Tinie Tempah Christmas Freestyle
- Young Jeezy and Freddie Gibbs
- Wale and Meek Mill
- Wiz Khalifa, Juicy J, Berner
- Nekfeu, Alpha Wann, Sneazzy West (1995) (France)

== Cultural impact ==
The song uses the phrase YOLO, an acronym for "you only live once". The phrase can be seen in youth culture: for example, a high school prank in Chicago, Illinois, involved high school students chanting "YOLO." Some people have graffitied YOLO on walls. It had become a popular Twitter hashtag by the end of the following year. Some youth at the time had said that it was their motto for some time.

The hip-hop magazine Da South reported that the rapper Lecrae has deconstructed the motto YOLO in his answer song "No Regrets". The Washington Post describes YOLO as "the newest acronym you'll love to hate". The Huffington Post says: "YOLO is dumb."

The phrase "you only live once" is commonly attributed to Mae West, but variations of the phrase have been in use for over 100 years, including as far back as (the German equivalent of) "one lives but once in the world" by Johann Wolfgang von Goethe in the play Clavigo in 1774, and as the title of a waltz Man lebt nur einmal! ("You Only Live Once!") by Johann Strauss II in 1855.

== Accolades ==
The song received a nomination at the 2013 Grammy Awards.

== Chart performance ==
The song debuted at number 18 on the US Billboard Hot 100 chart with first-week sales of 124,000. In its 22nd week, it ascended to number 14. On the week of February 18, 2012, "The Motto" reached number one on the US Rap Chart making it his 12th number one on the chart and extending his lead as the artist with the most number one hits since the chart began. As of April 2013, the song has sold 3,113,000 copies in the United States.

== Charts ==
=== Weekly charts ===
Chart (2011–2012)	Peak position
Belgium (Ultratip Bubbling Under Flanders)	29
Canada Hot 100 (Billboard)	38
UK R&B (Official Charts Company)	22
UK Singles (Official Charts Company)	80
US Billboard Hot 100	14
US Hot R&B/Hip-Hop Songs (Billboard)	1
US Pop Airplay (Billboard)	25
US Rhythmic Airplay (Billboard)	1

=== Year-end charts ===
Chart (2012)	Position
Canada (Canadian Hot 100)	72
US Billboard Hot 100	20
US Hot R&B/Hip-Hop Songs	4
US Hot Rap Songs	1
US Rhythmic	1

== Certifications ==
Region	Certification	Certified units/sales
Australia (ARIA) remix featuring Tyga	2× Platinum	140,000^{‡}
United Kingdom (BPI) remix featuring Tyga	Platinum	600,000^{‡}
United States (RIAA)	Diamond	10,000,000^{‡}
^{‡} Sales+streaming figures based on certification alone.

== Release history ==
Region	Date	Format
United States	November 29, 2011	Rhythmic contemporary radio
United States	November 29, 2011	Urban contemporary radio
United States	January 10, 2012	Rhythmic contemporary radio (re-release)
United States	January 10, 2012	Urban contemporary radio (re-release)
United Kingdom	April 6, 2012	Digital download
United States	April 10, 2012	Mainstream radio

== See also ==
- List of number-one R&B/hip-hop songs of 2012 (U.S.)
- List of Billboard Hot Rap Songs number-one hits of the 2010s#2012
