= Pop That =

2012 single by French Montana

Single by French Montana featuring Rick Ross, Drake and Lil Wayne

from the album Excuse My French
- Released: June 15, 2012
- Recorded: 2011
- Genre: Dirty rap; trap
- Length: 5:04
- Label: Coke Boys; Bad Boy; Maybach Music; Interscope
- Songwriters: Karim Kharbouch; William Roberts; Aubrey Graham; Dwayne Carter; Anthony Norris; Luther Campbell
- Producer: Lee on the Beats

French Montana singles chronology
"Stay Schemin'" (2012)	"Pop That" (2012)	"Who Booty (remix)" (2012)

Rick Ross singles chronology
"Beautiful Onyinye" (2012)	"Pop That" (2012)	"I Wish You Would" (2012)

Drake singles chronology
"No Lie" (2012)	"Pop That" (2012)	"Amen" (2012)

Lil Wayne singles chronology
"My Homies Still" (2012)	"Pop That" (2012)	"Enough of No Love" (2012)

"Pop That" is a song by Moroccan-American rapper French Montana featuring Canadian rapper Drake and fellow American rappers Rick Ross and Lil Wayne. Released as the lead single from the former's debut studio album Excuse My French (2013), it was produced by Lee on the Beats.

== Composition ==
"Pop That" is a dirty rap and trap song of five minutes and four seconds in length. The song's production, composed by record producer Lee on the Beats, is built around an 808 drum pattern, and was described by Tyler McDermott of Billboard as "abrasive", also noting that it also complemented the performance of the rappers well. A looped sample of the Uncle Luke song "I Wanna Rock" – specifically, the phrase "pop that, don't stop" – is used as the song's chorus.

== Music video ==
The music video premiered on MTV Jams on July 8, 2012. It was filmed in Miami. DJ Khaled, Ace Hood, The-Dream, Mack Maine and Birdman made a cameo appearances.

== Accolades ==
Complex named the song No. 29 on their list of the 50 best songs of 2012. BET named it their No. 2 music video of 2012 on their year-end Notarized countdown.

== Track listing ==
Digital download

1. "Pop That" (featuring Rick Ross, Drake and Lil Wayne) – 5:04

== Charts ==
=== Weekly charts ===
Chart (2012)	Peak position
US Billboard Hot 100	36
US Hot R&B/Hip-Hop Songs (Billboard)	2
US Hot Rap Songs (Billboard)	2

=== Year-end charts ===
Chart (2012)	Position
US Hot R&B/Hip-Hop Songs (Billboard)	30
US Hot Rap Songs (Billboard)	18

Chart (2013)	Position
US Hot R&B/Hip-Hop Songs (Billboard)	75
US Hot Rap Songs (Billboard)	50

== Certifications ==
Region	Certification	Certified units/sales
Canada (Music Canada)	Platinum	80,000^{‡}
United States (RIAA)	2× Platinum	2,000,000^{‡}
^{‡} Sales+streaming figures based on certification alone.

== Release history ==
Country	Date	Format	Label
United States	June 15, 2012	Digital download	Bad Boy, Interscope
United States	July 17, 2012	Rhythmic contemporary radio	Bad Boy, Interscope
