= Work Hard, Play Hard =

Single by Wiz Khalifa

from the album O.N.I.F.C.
- Released: April 23, 2012
- Genre: Hip hop
- Length: 3:40
- Label: Atlantic; Rostrum
- Songwriters: Cameron Thomaz; Benjamin Levin; Mikkel Storleer Eriksen; Tor Erik Hermansen
- Producers: Benny Blanco; Stargate

Wiz Khalifa singles chronology
"Payphone" (2012)	"Work Hard, Play Hard" (2012)	"Celebration" (2012)

"Work Hard, Play Hard" is a song by American rapper Wiz Khalifa, released as the lead single from his fourth studio album, O.N.I.F.C. (2012). The track features production from Benny Blanco and Stargate.

== Track listing ==
Digital download

1. "Work Hard, Play Hard" - 3:40

== Music video ==
The music video was directed by Bill Paladino and was released on May 23, 2012. It was filmed in Pittsburgh, Pennsylvania at multiple locations, including a ballet studio, the city suburbs, a private party at a bar, and a soccer field. It features a ballerina played by Katie Schurman, a construction worker played by Michael Major and a soccer player working in each of these roles, and later celebrating at the bar. Wiz Khalifa appears wearing clothes as a hippie, paying tribute to Jimi Hendrix. Multiple Taylor Gang members make cameo appearances as well.

Kansas City Chiefs wide receiver Steve Breaston, who graduated from Woodland Hills High School just outside Pittsburgh, also appears in the video.

== Remix ==
The official remix featuring Lil Wayne and Young Jeezy was revealed through his Twitter page on August 25, 2012. Drake was originally supposed to have a verse on the remix but that didn't come to fruition as he never submitted his verse.

== Notable mentions ==
Marco Rubio mentioned the song during March 2013 Rand Paul Filibuster of CIA Director. Rand Paul's filibuster tried to block President Obama's choice of John O. Brennan as CIA chief. Calling Wiz Khalifa a modern poet, Rubio mentioned the rapper by name and stated that he was reminded of his song "Work Hard, Play Hard. "You look at the time, I think it's a time when many of our colleagues expected to be home, back in the home state playing hard," Rubio said, "but I'm happy we're here still working hard on this issue."

== Charts ==
=== Weekly charts ===
Chart (2012)	Peak position
Canada Hot 100 (Billboard)	40
France (SNEP)	50
Germany (GfK)	76
US Billboard Hot 100	17
US Hot R&B/Hip-Hop Songs (Billboard)	13
US Rhythmic Airplay (Billboard)	2

=== Year-end charts ===
Chart (2012)	Position
France (SNEP)	167
US Billboard Hot 100	73
US Hot R&B/Hip-Hop Songs (Billboard)	65
US Rhythmic (Billboard)	14

== Certifications ==
Region	Certification	Certified units/sales
Canada (Music Canada)	Gold	40,000^{*}
United States (RIAA)	4× Platinum	4,000,000^{‡}
^{*} Sales figures based on certification alone.^{‡} Sales+streaming figures based on certification alone.

== Release history ==
Country	Date	Format	Label
United States	April 25, 2012	Digital download	Atlantic Records

== Credits and personnel ==
- Songwriter – Cameron Thomaz, Benjamin Levin, Mikkel Storleer Eriksen, Tor Erik Hermansen
- Production – Benny Blanco, Stargate
