= Cashin' Out =

Single by Cash Out

from the album It's My Time
- Released: March 3, 2012
- Recorded: 2011
- Genre: Hip hop
- Length: 3:58
- Label: Epic
- Songwriters: John Gibson; Gary Hill
- Producer: DJ Spinz

Cash Out singles chronology
"Cashin' Out" (2012)	"Big Booty" (2012)

Music video
- "Cashin' Out" on YouTube

"Cashin' Out" is a song by American rapper Cash Out. It was released on March 3, 2012 as his debut single, originally from his mixtape It's My Time, though the song itself was available on YouTube as of November 21, 2011. Produced by DJ Spinz, it peaked at number 36 on the Billboard Hot 100, number 2 on the Hot R&B/Hip-Hop Songs chart, and number 1 on the Rap Songs chart. It is Cash Out's only top 40 hit to date. Complex named the song number 45 on its list of the best songs of 2012. "Cashin' Out" was mentioned in the infamous Naval Academy sex scandal by the accuser. Even with only 20 weeks on the chart, and such a low peak position, the single managed to make the Billboard Year-End Hot 100 of 2012, being ranked at number 92.

== Music video ==
The music video for "Cashin' Out" was released on March 19, 2012 on VEVO and YouTube. It was directed by Gabriel Hart.

== Remixes ==
- The official remix features a new verse from Ca$h Out along with fellow rappers Akon, Fabolous, Young Jeezy and Yo Gotti.
- There is also a second remix with features from Akon, Roscoe Dash and Wale.
- Lil Wayne also did a remix of the song on his mixtape Dedication 4.
- Krayzie Bone also did a remix of the song, which he subsequently released a music video for.
- Chief Keef did a remix of the song which was released on GBE's For Greater Glory mixtape.

== Charts and certifications ==
=== Weekly charts ===
Chart (2012)	Peak position
US Billboard Hot 100	36
US Hot R&B/Hip-Hop Songs (Billboard)	2
US Hot Rap Songs (Billboard)	1
US Rhythmic Airplay (Billboard)	2

=== Year-end charts ===
Chart (2012)	Position
US Billboard Hot 100	92
US Hot R&B/Hip-Hop Songs (Billboard)	16
US Rap Songs (Billboard)	8
US Rhythmic (Billboard)	18

=== Certifications ===
Region	Certification	Certified units/sales
United States (RIAA)	Platinum	1,000,000^{^}
^{^} Shipments figures based on certification alone.

== Release history ==
Region	Date	Format(s)	Label	Ref.
United States	March 27, 2012	Rhythmic contemporary radio	Epic	
