= No Lie (2 Chainz song) =

Single by 2 Chainz featuring Drake

from the album Based on a T.R.U. Story
- Released: May 8, 2012
- Recorded: 2012
- Genre: Hip hop; trap
- Length: 3:59
- Label: Def Jam
- Songwriters: Tauheed Epps; Aubrey Graham; Noah Shebib; Michael Williams; Marquel Middlebrooks
- Producers: Mike Will Made It; Marz; 40

2 Chainz singles chronology
"Mercy" (2012)	"No Lie" (2012)	"Breakfast (Syrup)" (2012)

Drake singles chronology
"HYFR (Hell Ya Fucking Right)" (2012)	"No Lie" (2012)	"Pop That" (2012)

Music video
- "No Lie" on YouTube

"No Lie" is the debut single by American rapper 2 Chainz featuring Canadian rapper Drake, released as the lead single from the former's debut studio album Based on a T.R.U. Story (2012). Produced by Mike Will Made It, the song was released to iTunes on May 8, 2012, and based on digital downloads was able to debut in the top 50 on the Billboard Hot 100. The single has sold 1,400,000 copies digitally and has been certified 3× Platinum.

== Critical reception ==
Billboard commented on the track by saying "...'No Lie' recalls Lil Wayne's recent 'She Will' single when Drake steps in to slow things down on the chorus, but 2 Chainz sounds hungrier than his counterpart here, steamrolling over the beat and slinging weak rhymes. 2 Chainz' voice is silent on the track for about a minute and 40 seconds as Drake struts into focus, and while the Canadian superstar gamely handles his assignment, the listener misses Chainz' urgency until he returns, possessed, for the third verse. Wordplay isn't the MC's strong suit, but it doesn't need to be-his career renaissance can be chalked up as much to his acceptance of his own firecracker energy as his smart selection of beats. No lie: 2 Chainz probably has another hit on his hands." Complex named the song #17 on their list of the best 50 songs of 2012.

== Chart performance ==
The song debuted at number 46 on the Billboard Hot 100 based on digital downloads alone. In its 16th week on September 8, 2012, the song peaked at number 24. For the week of August 18, 2012, the song reached No. 1 on the Billboard Hot R&B/Hip-Hop Songs chart becoming Drake's 10th No. 1 on the chart. Thus the tie that he had previously possessed with Jay-Z for most No. 1 hits on the chart was broken. After the ascent of "No Lie" to No. 1, Drake now has the most No. 1 hits on the R&B/Hip-Hop songs chart for any rapper in history. The single also reached the summit of the Rap Songs chart, and became Drake's 13th No. 1 hit, thus extending his record for most No. 1 hits on the chart over runner-up Diddy who has ten. As of August 2013, the song has sold 1,400,000 copies in the United States.

== Music video ==
The music video for "No Lie" premiered on 106 & Park on June 18, 2012. It was filmed in black-and-white and directed by Director X.

== Remix ==
Many artists took part in freestyling this track including, Lil Wayne, Wiz Khalifa, Roscoe Dash and King Los. Wiz Khalifa's freestyle is titled "Don't Lie". Lil Wayne freestyled this track on his mixtape Dedication 4.

== Charts ==
=== Weekly charts ===
Chart (2012)	Peak position
US Billboard Hot 100	24
US Hot R&B/Hip-Hop Songs (Billboard)	1
US Hot Rap Songs (Billboard)	1
US Rhythmic Airplay (Billboard)	3

=== Year-end charts ===
Chart (2012)	Position
US Billboard Hot 100	54
US Hot R&B/Hip-Hop Songs (Billboard)	8
US Rap Songs (Billboard)	6
US Rhythmic (Billboard)	24

Chart (2013)	Position
US Hot R&B/Hip-Hop Songs (Billboard)	94

== Certifications ==
Region	Certification	Certified units/sales
United States (RIAA)	3× Platinum	3,000,000^{‡}
^{‡} Sales+streaming figures based on certification alone.

== Radio and release history ==
Country	Date	Format	Label
United States	May 8, 2012	Digital download	Def Jam
United States	May 15, 2012	Urban radio	Def Jam

== See also ==
- List of number-one R&B/hip-hop songs of 2012 (U.S.)
- List of number-one rap singles of 2012 (U.S.)
