= Kevin Gates discography =

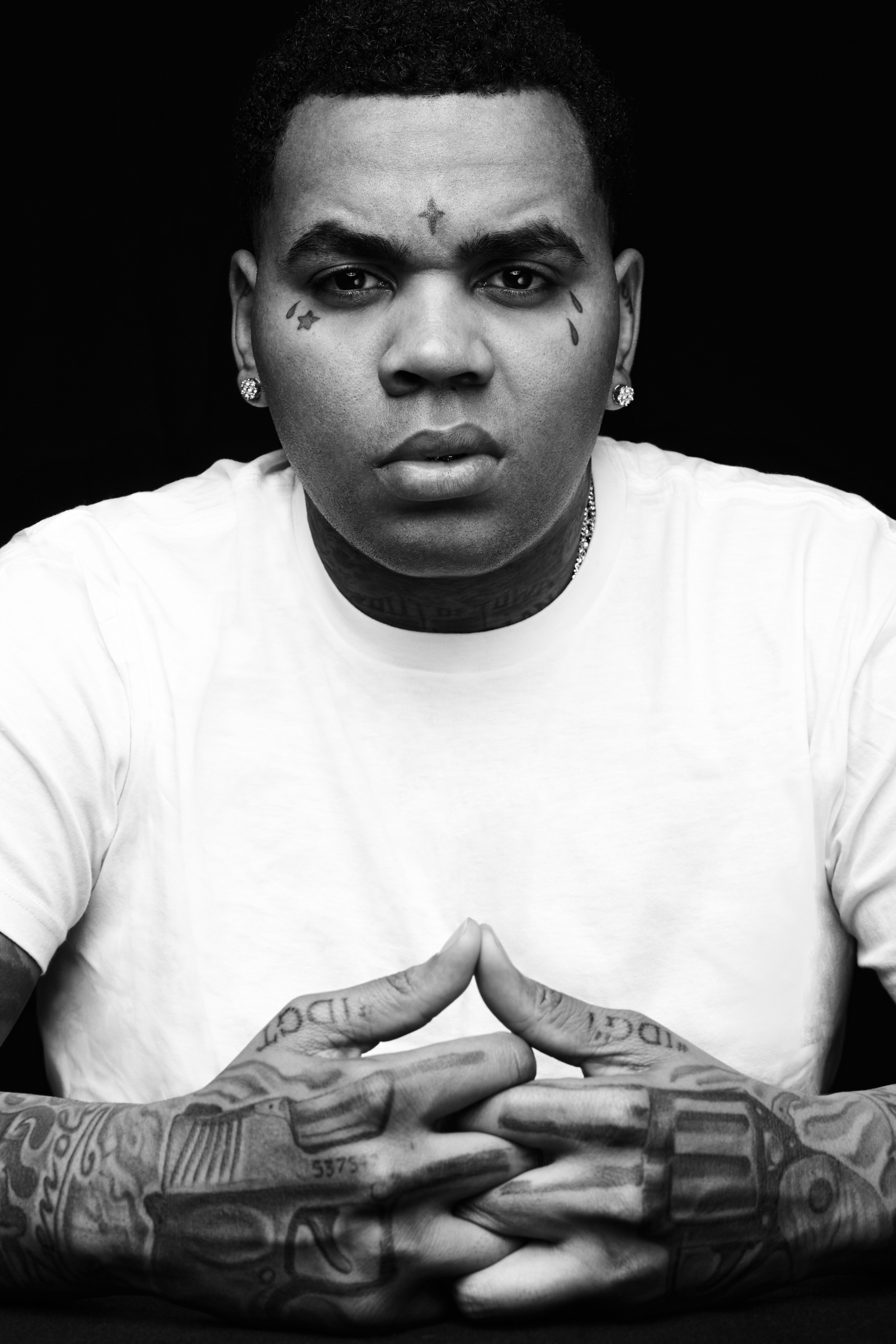
- Kevin Gates in 2014
- Studio albums: 5
- EPs: 3
- Singles: 35
- Mixtapes: 17

American hip-hop recording artist Kevin Gates has released five studio albums, three extended plays, nineteen mixtapes and thirty-four singles (including ten as a featured artist).

== Albums ==
=== Studio albums ===
List of studio albums, with selected chart positions and certifications
Title	Album details	Peak chart positions				Certifications
Title	Album details	US	US R&B/HH	US Rap	CAN	Certifications
Islah	Released: January 29, 2016; Label: Bread Winners' Association, Dead Game, Atlantic; Format: CD, LP, cassette, digital download, streaming	2	2	1	16	RIAA: 3× Platinum
I'm Him	Released: September 27, 2019; Label: Bread Winners' Association, Atlantic; Format: CD, digital download, streaming	4	2	2	28	RIAA: Platinum
Khaza	Released: June 17, 2022; Label: Bread Winners' Alumni, Atlantic; Format: CD, digital download, streaming	8	4	2	—	
The Ceremony	Released: January 26, 2024; Label: Bread Winners' Alumni, Atlantic; Format: CD, LP, digital download, streaming	24	8	7	—	
I'm Him 2	Released: March 19, 2025; Label: Bread Winners' Alumni, APG; Format: Digital download, streaming	63	20	15	—	
"—" denotes items which were not released in that country or failed to chart.

== Mixtapes ==
List of mixtapes, with selected chart positions and certifications
Title	Mixtape details	Peak chart positions				Certifications
Title	Mixtape details	US	US R&B/HH	US Rap	CAN	Certifications
Pick of Da Litter	Released: 2007; Label: Self-released; Format: CD, digital download	—	—	—	—	
All or Nuthin'	Released: May 5, 2009; Label: Self-released; Format: CD, digital download	—	—	—	—	
All In	Released: May 5, 2009; Label: Self-released; Format: CD, digital download	—	—	—	—	
Behind Enemy Lines	Released: November 28, 2009; Label: Self-released; Format: CD, digital download	—	—	—	—	
The Leak	Released: November 26, 2010; Label: Self-released; Format: CD, digital download	—	—	—	—	
I Don't Know What 2 Call It (Vol. 1)	Released: December 20, 2011; Label: Self-released; Format: CD, digital download	—	—	—	—	
Make Em' Believe	Released: April 17, 2012; Label: Bread Winners' Association, Dead Game; Format: CD, digital download	—	—	—	—	
In the Meantime	Released: September 25, 2012; Label: Bread Winners' Association, Dead Game; Format: CD, digital download	—	—	—	—	
The Luca Brasi Story	Released: March 22, 2013; Label: Bread Winners' Association, Dead Game; Format: CD, digital download	—	—	—	—	
Stranger Than Fiction	Released: July 16, 2013; Label: Bread Winners' Association, Atlantic, Dead Game; Format: CD, digital download	37	11	7	—	
By Any Means	Released: March 17, 2014; Label: Bread Winners' Association, Atlantic, Dead Game; Format: CD, LP, digital download	17	5	3	—	RIAA: Gold
Luca Brasi 2	Released: December 14, 2014; Label: Bread Winners' Association, Atlantic, Dead Game; Format: CD, LP, digital download	38	5	3	—	RIAA: Platinum
Murder for Hire	Released: May 26, 2015; Label: Bread Winners' Association, Atlantic, Dead Game; Format: CD, LP, digital download	—	—	—	—	
Murder for Hire 2	Released: May 27, 2016; Label: Bread Winners' Association, Atlantic; Format: Digital download	12	3	2	—	
By Any Means 2	Released: September 22, 2017; Label: Bread Winners' Association, Atlantic; Format: Digital download, streaming	4	3	3	70	
Luca Brasi 3	Released: September 28, 2018; Label: Bread Winners' Association, Atlantic; Format: Digital download, streaming	4	3	3	32	RIAA: Platinum
Only the Generals, Pt. II	Released: February 19, 2021; Label: Bread Winners' Association, Atlantic; Format: Digital download, streaming	18	11	9	—	
The Luca Brasi Story (A Decade of Brasi)	Released: February 3, 2023; Label: Bread Winners' Association, Atlantic; Format: Digital download, streaming	—	—	—	—	
Luca Brasi 4	Released: August 13, 2025; Label: Bread Winners' Association, Atlantic; Format: Digital download, streaming	44	11	8	—	

== Extended plays ==
Title	EP details	Peak chart positions
Title	EP details	US
Chained to the City	Released: May 15, 2018; Label: Bread Winners' Association, Atlantic; Format: Digital download, streaming	—
4 Respect (with YoungBoy Never Broke Again)	Released: August 24, 2018; Label: Bread Winners' Association, Atlantic, Never Broke Again; Format: Digital download, streaming	19
Only the Generals Gon Understand	Released: June 1, 2019; Label: Bread Winners' Association, Atlantic; Format: Digital download, streaming	18
"—" denotes items which were not released in that country or failed to chart.

== Singles ==
=== As lead artist ===
List of singles as lead artist, with selected chart positions, showing year released and album name
Title	Year	Peak chart positions						Certifications	Album
Title	Year	US	US R&B/HH	US Rap	CAN	NZ Hot	WW	Certifications	Album
"Satellites"	2013	—	—	—	—	—	—	RIAA: Gold	Make Em' Believe
"Don't Know"	2014	—	—	—	—	—	—		By Any Means
"Posed to Be in Love"	2014	—	— (Note: "Posed to Be in Love" did not enter the Hot R&B/Hip-Hop Songs chart, but peaked at number five on the Bubbling Under R&B/Hip-Hop Singles chart.)	—	—	—	—	RIAA: 2× Platinum	By Any Means
"Amnesia" (featuring Doe B)	2014	—	—	—	—	—	—		By Any Means
"I Don't Get Tired" (featuring August Alsina)	2014	90	29	20	—	—	—	RIAA: 2× Platinum	Luca Brasi 2
"Kno One"	2015	—	— (Note: "Kno One" did not enter the Hot R&B/Hip-Hop Songs chart, but peaked at number nine on the Bubbling Under R&B/Hip-Hop Singles chart.)	—	—	—	—	RIAA: Platinum	Islah
"Really Really"	2015	46	14	9	91	—	—	RIAA: 6× Platinum; RMNZ: Gold	Islah
"2 Phones"	2015	17	3	2	52	—	—	RIAA: 5× Platinum; RMNZ: Platinum	Islah
"Time for That"	2016	— (Note: "Time for That" did not enter the Billboard Hot 100, but peaked at number 19 on the Bubbling Under Hot 100 chart.)	48	—	—	—	—	RIAA: 2× Platinum	Islah
"What If"	2017	— (Note: "What If" did not enter the Billboard Hot 100, but peaked at number 13 on the Bubbling Under Hot 100 chart.)	— (Note: "What If" did not enter the Hot R&B/Hip-Hop Songs chart, but peaked at number two on the Bubbling Under R&B/Hip-Hop Singles chart.)	—	—	—	—		By Any Means 2
"No Love"	2017	—	—	—	—	—	—		By Any Means 2
"Me Too"	2018	— (Note: "Me Too" did not enter the Billboard Hot 100, but peaked at number 14 on the Bubbling Under Hot 100 chart.)	—	—	—	—	—	RIAA: 2x Platinum	Luca Brasi 3
"Great Man"	2018	— (Note: "Great Man" did not enter the Billboard Hot 100, but peaked at number 18 on the Bubbling Under Hot 100 chart.)	—	—	—	—	—	RIAA: Platinum	Luca Brasi 3
"Money Long"	2018	— (Note: "Money Long" did not enter the Billboard Hot 100, but peaked at number 16 on the Bubbling Under Hot 100 chart.)	—	—	—	—	—	RIAA: Gold	Luca Brasi 3
"Adding Up"	2018	—	—	—	—	—	—	RIAA: Gold	Luca Brasi 3
"Big Gangsta"	2019	81	31	25	98	—	132	RIAA: Platinum; RMNZ: Gold	Only the Generals Gon Understand
"Yukatan"	2019	—	—	—	—	—	—		Only the Generals Gon Understand
"I Got the Dope"	2019	—	—	—	—	—	—		Only the Generals Gon Understand
"Push It"	2019	— (Note: "Push It" did not enter the Billboard Hot 100, but peaked at number 23 on the Bubbling Under Hot 100 chart.)	—	—	—	—	—	RIAA: Gold	I'm Him
"Facts"	2019	— (Note: "Facts" did not enter the Billboard Hot 100, but peaked at number four on the Bubbling Under Hot 100 chart.)	—	—	—	—	—	RIAA: Platinum	I'm Him
"Convertible Burt" (with Tory Lanez)	2020	—	—	—	—	—	—		Road to Fast 9
"Broken Love" (with MO3)	2020	—	—	—	—	—	—	RIAA: 2x Platinum	Shottaz 4Eva
"Weeks"	2020	—	—	—	—	—	—		Non-album singles
"Power" (with Dermot Kennedy)	2020	— (Note: "Power" did not enter the Billboard Hot 100, but peaked at number 24 on the Bubbling Under Hot 100 chart.)	—	—	—	—	—	RIAA: Gold	Non-album singles
"Plug Daughter 2"	2021	— (Note: "Plug Daughter 2" did not enter the Billboard Hot 100, but peaked at number three on the Bubbling Under Hot 100 chart.)	39	—	—	—	—		Only the Generals, Pt. II
"Super General Freestyle"	2022	—	—	—	—	—	—		Non-album single
"Thinking with My Dick" (featuring Juicy J)	2022	37	11	9	40	—	49	RIAA: Platinum	Stranger than Fiction and Khaza
"Breakfast"	2023	— (Note: "Breakfast" did not enter the Billboard Hot 100, but peaked at number 15 on the Bubbling Under Hot 100 chart.)	45	—	—	—	—		Non-album singles
"I'm a Dog"	2025	—	35	25	—	4	—		Non-album singles
"—" denotes releases that did not chart or receive certification.

=== As featured artist ===
List of singles as featured artist, with selected chart positions, showing year released and album name
Title	Year	Peak chart positions		Certifications	Album
Title	Year	US	US R&B/HH	Certifications	Album
"Light Show" (Berner featuring Kevin Gates)	2018	—	—		Rico
"Play With Us" (Lil Durk featuring Kevin Gates)	2018	—	—		Signed to the Streets 3
"All Thee Above" (Plies featuring Kevin Gates)	2018	— (Note: "All Thee Above" did not enter the Billboard Hot 100, but peaked at number 13 on the Bubbling Under Hot 100 chart.)	—		Purple Heart
"That's My Nigga" (Marcus Black featuring Kevin Gates)	2018	—	—		Non-album single
"I'm Not Goin" (Gucci Mane featuring Kevin Gates)	2018	— (Note: "I'm Not Goin" did not enter the Billboard Hot 100, but peaked at number 17 on the Bubbling Under Hot 100 chart.)	—		Evil Genius
"I Do This On The Regular" (DJ Kay Slay featuring Kevin Gates)	2019	—	—		Hip-Hop Frontline
"Let Me See" (Juicy J featuring Lil Skies and Kevin Gates)	2019	—	—		Non-album singles
"Flewed Out" (Kodie Shane featuring Kevin Gates)	2019	—	—		Non-album singles
"Cuban Links" (Rod Wave featuring Kevin Gates)	2019	92	39	RIAA: Platinum	Ghetto Gospel
"Titanic" (Rod Wave featuring Kevin Gates)	2019	—	—	RIAA: Gold	Ghetto Gospel
"Dear God" (FL Dusa featuring Kevin Gates)	2021	— (Note: "Dear God" did not enter the Billboard Hot 100, but peaked at number 11 on the Bubbling Under Hot 100 chart.)	39	RIAA: Gold	Non-album single
"—" denotes releases that did not chart or receive certification.

== Other charted and certified songs ==
Title	Year	Peak chart positions				Certifications	Album
Title	Year	US	US R&B/HH	US Rap	CAN	Certifications	Album
"Paper Chasers"	2013	—	—	—	—	RIAA: Platinum	Luca Brasi Story
"Again"	2014	—	—	—	—	RIAA: Gold	By Any Means
"Wish I Had It"	2014	—	—	—	—	RIAA: Platinum	By Any Means
"Stop Lyin'"	2014	—	—	—	—	RIAA: Platinum	By Any Means
"Get Up on My Level"	2014	—	—	—	—	RIAA: Gold	By Any Means
"Not the Only One"	2016	—	—	—	—	RIAA: Platinum	Islah
"Jam" (featuring Trey Songz, Ty Dolla Sign and Jamie Foxx)	2016	97	29	17	—	RIAA: Platinum	Islah
"La Familia"	2016	—	— (Note: "La Familia" did not enter the Hot R&B/Hip-Hop Songs chart, but peaked at number seven on the Bubbling Under R&B/Hip-Hop Singles chart.)	—	—	RIAA: Gold	Islah
"One Thing"	2016	—	—	—	—	RIAA: Platinum	Islah
"Pride"	2016	—	— (Note: "Pride" did not enter the Hot R&B/Hip-Hop Songs chart, but peaked at number one on the Bubbling Under R&B/Hip-Hop Singles chart.)	—	—	RIAA: Platinum	Islah
"Hard For"	2016	—	— (Note: "Hard For" did not enter the Hot R&B/Hip-Hop Songs chart, but peaked at number eight on the Bubbling Under R&B/Hip-Hop Singles chart.)	—	—	RIAA: Platinum	Islah
"Ain't Too Hard"	2016	—	—	—	—	RIAA: Gold	Islah
"Know Better"	2016	—	— (Note: "Know Better" did not enter the Hot R&B/Hip-Hop Songs chart, but peaked at number one on the Bubbling Under R&B/Hip-Hop Singles chart.)	—	—		Suicide Squad: The Album
"Had To"	2017	— (Note: "Had To" did not enter the Billboard Hot 100, but peaked at number 21 on the Bubbling Under Hot 100 chart.)	— (Note: "Had To" did not enter the Hot R&B/Hip-Hop Songs chart, but peaked at number six on the Bubbling Under R&B/Hip-Hop Singles chart.)	—	—		By Any Means 2
"Imagine That"	2017	— (Note: "Imagine That" did not enter the Billboard Hot 100, but peaked at number 12 on the Bubbling Under Hot 100 chart.)	— (Note: "Imagine That" did not enter the Hot R&B/Hip-Hop Songs chart, but peaked at number one on the Bubbling Under R&B/Hip-Hop Singles chart.)	—	—		By Any Means 2
"Beautiful Scars" (featuring PnB Rock)	2017	—	— (Note: "Beautiful Scars" did not enter the Hot R&B/Hip-Hop Songs chart, but peaked at number nine on the Bubbling Under R&B/Hip-Hop Singles chart.)	—	—		By Any Means 2
"Change Lanes"	2018	68	34	—	—		Chained to the City
"Let It Sing"	2018	82	41	—	—		Chained to the City
"Shoulda"	2018	—	—	—	—	RIAA: Platinum	Luca Brasi 3
"Shakin Back"	2018	—	—	—	—	RIAA: Gold	Luca Brasi 3
"Tryna Yea"	2018	—	—	—	—	RIAA: Gold	Luca Brasi 3
"I Got U"	2018	—	—	—	—	RIAA: Gold	Luca Brasi 3
"Servin H"	2018	—	—	—	—	RIAA: Gold	Luca Brasi 3
"Find U Again"	2018	—	—	—	—	RIAA: Platinum	Luca Brasi 3
"In God I Trust"	2018	—	—	—	—	RIAA: Platinum	Luca Brasi 3
"Don't Know"	2018	—	—	—	—	RIAA: Gold	Luca Brasi 3
"I Am Who They Say I Am" (YoungBoy Never Broke Again featuring Quando Rondo and Kevin Gates)	2018	69	24	—	—	RIAA: 2× Platinum	4Respect
"TTG" (YoungBoy Never Broke Again featuring Kevin Gates)	2018	— (Note: "TTG" did not enter the Billboard Hot 100, but peaked at number three on the Bubbling Under Hot 100 chart.)	45	—	—	RIAA: Platinum	4Respect
"Pop Star" (DaBaby featuring Kevin Gates)	2019	49	25	22	97	RIAA: Gold	Kirk
"Icebox"	2019	—	—	—	—	RIAA: Gold	I'm Him
"By My Lonely"	2019	86	43	—	—	RIAA: Gold	I'm Him
"Bags"	2019	—	—	—	—	RIAA: Gold	I'm Him
"Fatal Attraction"	2019	—	—	—	—	RIAA: Gold	I'm Him
"Walls Talking"	2019	—	—	—	—	RIAA: Platinum	I'm Him
"Face Down"	2019	—	—	—	—	RIAA: Gold	I'm Him
"Funny How"	2019	—	—	—	—	RIAA: Gold	I'm Him
"Fly Again"	2019					RIAA: Gold	I'm Him
"—" denotes releases that did not chart or receive certification.

== Guest appearances ==
List of non-single guest appearances, with other performing artists, showing year released and album name
Title	Year	Other artist(s)	Album
"Bout That"	2009	Dumaine, Savage	I'm Who They Waitin'
"I'm Clean"	2010	Max Minelli	The Leak
"Dream Team"	2010	Max Minelli, Malachi X	The Leak
"Bow Flex"	2011	9th Ward Earnka	—N/a
"Drug Dealer Potential"	2011	JT the Bigga Figga	Drug Dealer Potential
"Every Little Thing I Do"	2011	JT the Bigga Figga	Drug Dealer Potential
"Friends to the End"	2011	JT the Bigga Figga	Drug Dealer Potential
"My Runner"	2011	JT the Bigga Figga, Fresh	Drug Dealer Potential
"Murder"	2011	T-Bo	Dat White Dude
"Ink Bleed" (Remix)	2012	Flow, Bonka, G. Wilson	Wolf
"Burnin'"	2012	French Montana, Akon, Chinx	Coke Boys 3
"Hustle All Day"	2012	Gudda Gudda, Flow	Guddaville 3
"All I Want"	2012	Juvenile, Skip	Juvie Tuesdays
"Hit Dat" Remix	2012	Level, Hurricane Chris	Club Banga King
"Nasty"	2012	Lil Cali	Against All Odds
"Bills"	2012	Lil Chuckee	The Cypher
"Shut Up and Get Money"	2012	Rodnae Da Boss, Ruccas, Yung Duke	I'm Not a Rapper
"What You Doin Here"	2012	Young Salo	—N/a
"Wild Out"	2012	Young Troll, Kaotic	Y.T.E 4 Life
"What U Think About That"	2012	Young Troll, Keenan	Y.T.E 4 Life
"Everytime You See Me"	2013	1 Shot Dealz	Ambitionz of a Ryder
"Long Haul"	2013	Alley Boy, Starlito	War Cry
"Beat It Up"	2013	Bloody Jay	Blatlanta II: Brazy
"Catch That"	2013	DJ Bay Bay, Big Poppa, Lil Snupe	Bay Bay Day 2013
"Movie"	2013	DJ Bay Bay, DJ Khaled, Juvenile	Bay Bay Day 2013
"Back in the Day"	2013	DJ Kay Slay, Big K.R.I.T., Trae tha Truth	The Last Champion
"Came from Nothin'"	2013	DJ Spinatik, Gunplay, Verse Simmonds	Came From Nothin'
"Leash on Life"	2013	Starlito, Don Trip	Step Brothers 2
"All About My Paper"	2013	Dorrough	Shut the City Down 1.5
"These Hoes"	2013	Ty Dolla $ign	Beach House 2
"You Gonna Love Me"	2013	Jim Jack	Solo Grind
"Empty World"	2013	Figg Panamera, Gucci Mane	Fillmoelanta, Pt. 3
"Never Will I"	2013	Figg Panamera, Gucci Mane	Fillmoelanta, Pt. 3
"When I'm Grindin'"	2013	Figg Panamera, Gucci Mane	Fillmoelanta, Pt. 3
"I'm Realla"	2013	Figg Panamera, Gucci Mane	Fillmoelanta, Pt. 3
"Hit the Books and Pray"	2013	Figg Panamera, Gucci Mane	Fillmoelanta, Pt. 3
"Snake Niggas"	2013	Migos	Streets on Lock
"Trust You"	2013	Pusha T	Wrath of Caine
"She Ain't Right"	2013	Rod-D, Daone	No Days Off 2
"Gudda"	2013	Shy Glizzy	Law 2
"Facedown"	2013	Shyst Red, Wale	Black Migo Shyst
"America's Nightmare"	2013	SL Jones, Killer Mike	Way of Life No Hobby
"What U Mean to Me"	2013	Slim Thug, Muggs	Boss Life
"Summ Serious"	2013	Starlito	Cold Turkey
"Dark Angel"	2013	Trae tha Truth	I Am King
"Can't Fall in Love"	2013	Trump Da Don	—N/a
"In It 2 Win It"	2013	Yo Gutta	Low Key
"Anybody Can Get It"	2013	Yung Mazi	Murdarati
"Red Light, Green Light"	2013	Yung Mazi	Murdarati
"Come Up"	2013	Zed Zilla	Time 2 Eat
"No Patience"	2014	Alley Boy	Alley Shakur
"You Don't Love Me"	2014	Alvin Ray	Trally Boy Heat
"Lambo"	2014	B.o.B., Jake Lambo	No Genre Pt. 2
"Nasty" (Remix)	2014	Bandit Gang Marco, Young Thug	You Don't Know Me
"Childhood"	2014	BWA Kane	Ain't Nothin Bigga than the B
"Dis Pack"	2014	Chill Will, Fat Trel	Live from the Bando
"Court"	2014	D Dash, Percy Keith	Trap Music: Popular Edition
"I Be"	2014	Dreco	Abnormal Way of Life
"You Sleep Out Here"	2014	Devious	You Sleep Out Here
"The Deal"	2014	Gotti Green, Johnny Moog	Bank Money
"Diamonds"	2014	Hatch Boy	Bigger Than Rap 2
"Addicted to Money" (Remix)	2014	Jigg, Zed Zilla	—N/a
"Amazin' Story"	2014	K.E. on the Track, Yung Mazi	I Am Music
"Mud"	2014	LaTre'	Mud
"Strippers Bop" (Remix)	2014	Laudie, Jim Jones	—N/a
"We Are Strong"	2014	Lil Bibby	Free Crack 2
"By Myself"	2014	Lil' Keke, 8Ball	Money Don't Sleep
"Feenin'"	2014	Lyrica Anderson	King Me 2
"Don't Make Em Like Me"	2014	Mouse on tha Track	Air Time
"Sex, Drugs & Money"	2014	Mouse on tha Track	Air Time
"2 Rounds" (Remix)	2014	Propain, Rich Homie Quan	—N/a
"Lose Control"	2014	Percy Keith	Crazy on tha Outside
"Highway"	2014	Percy Keith	Crazy on tha Outside
"Ride Around"	2014	Richie Wess	Wess Side Story
"Sick"	2014	Rico Love	I Sin
"Head Honcho"	2014	Rod-D, Baby E, Playamone	No Days Off 2
"50 Grams"	2014	Roy Demeo	—N/a
"Ballin'"	2014	Starlito, Juicy J	—N/a
"Don't Do It"	2014	Starlito	Black Sheep Don't Grin
"For Sale"	2014	Tana	Shit Done Got Real Reloaded
"Black On Black"	2014	The Game, Young Jeezy	Blood Moon: Year of the Wolf
"Nothing"	2014	Tre Pierre	Mixtape Maniac II
"Pay Off"	2014	Tre Pierre, D Eazy	Mixtape Maniac II
"Get 2 It"	2014	Willie Joe, Shay Sanchez	I'm from the Bay Bruh
"Pussy Nigga" (Remix)	2014	Woop, Plies, Yo Gotti	Woop Nation
"Drugs" (Remix)	2014	Young Scooter, Rich Homie Quan	Street Lotery 2: Remix Edition
"Money Off Cocaine"	2014	Yung Mazi, Young Thug	Trapanomics
"Make It or Take It"	2014	Yung Mazi, Bloody Jay	Trapanomics
"Ova Now"	2014	Yung Mazi	Trapz N Trunkz
"All the Way"	2015	Big Head, Bugsy Calhoone	In My Feelings
"Live"	2015	Big Mota	—N/a
"Ducktape"	2015	Madd Marvin	—N/a
"Pull Up"	2015	Squirm G, Ryan Legend	—N/a
"Gangsta"	2015	FLATLINE, Z-Ro	—N/a
"Worst Pain"	2015	Derez De'Shon	—N/a
"Me U & Hennessy (Remix)"	2015	DeJ Loaf	—N/a
"Mexico"	2015	Stitches	—N/a
"Let Me Find Out"	2015	Bluff City	4 Play
"Bet That Up"	2015	Boldy James, Snootie Wild	Trapper's Alley 2
"Our Life"	2015	C-Steeze	World So Cold
"Day 1's"	2015	Cool Amerika	No Taxes 2
"Stripes"	2015	DC Young Fly	Supplyin Pressure
"I Like That"	2015	DJ Holiday	God Bless
"Rollin Round"	2015	DJ Holiday	God Bless
"Bang Bang"	2015	Trevor Jackson	In My Feelings
"Right Now"	2015	DJ Bay Bay, Ant Banks, Kirko Bangz	Right Now
"I Know It"	2015	Fdamusic	Fame
"Paper, Steak & Shrimp"	2015	Freddy G, King J, Pimp C	The Unexpected
"Keep Gettin' Money"	2015	Fredo Santana	Ain't No Money Like Trap Money
"No Sleep"	2015	GeeQue	—N/a
"Straight Drop"	2015	JE Da Substance	God's DNA
"9"	2015	Jacquees, Young Scooter	Mood
"Payback"	2015	Juicy J, Future, Sage the Gemini	Furious 7
"On Me"	2015	K Check, Juicy J, Problem	—N/a
"Cut Up"	2015	Lil Cali, Nunu James	Work Call
"Solid"	2015	Lil E, Dev Demetries	Fast Life Livin
"No Sleep"	2015	Lil Shown 1000	Don Stati2
"Earn Your Keep"	2015	Loaded Lux, Fat Trel	Beloved 2
"Middle Finger"	2015	Kidd Kidd, Young Buck	Fuk Da Fame
"Fall"	2015	Maino, Money	King of Brooklyn
"News"	2015	Mistah F.A.B.	Welcome 2 Da Dope Era
"How Can I"	2015	Need Bucks	Here for a Reason
"Murda Game"	2015	OG Boobie Black	—N/a
"Doin Numbers"	2015	Randy Bee	Beezy Porter
"She Ain't Right"	2015	Rocko, Rod-D	Strictly 4 The Traps N Trunks 94
"Don't Do It" (remix)	2015	Starlito, Young Dolph	Black Sheep Don't Grin
"Responsibility"	2015	Tjourney Arrae	—N/a
"Tatted On My Face (Remix)"	2015	Sauce Twinz, Sauce Walka, 5thWard JP	—N/a
"Solid"	2015	Trae Tha Truth	All-Star Weekend 2015
"Bullshit"	2015	Vee Tha Rula	RULA 2
"Ion Feel Em"	2015	Yo Gotti	Concealed
"Destroyed"	2015	Young Thug, Birdman, Lil Duke	—N/a
"Finessin (Remix)"	2015	Baby E, Lil Wayne, Lil Bibby	—N/a
"Coldest (Remix)"	2015	Rico Love, Trick Daddy, Trina	—N/a
"Whippin Up"	2015	Chedda Da Connect, Scrilla	—N/a
"Insomnia"	2015	Tyler J	—N/a
"In Your Dreams"	2015	Yung Mazi	Strictly 4 the Traps N Trunks 92
"She Knows"	2015	Jeezy	Gangsta Party
"Boss Shitt"	2015	Stevie Stone	Malta Bend
"I Feel Like"	2015	2 Chainz	Trap-a-Velli Tre
"Move On"	2015	Wiz Khalifa	Cabin Fever 3
"Goonin"	2016	Montana of 300	Fire In the Church
"Mojo"	2016	Compton Menace	The Way It Is
"U Suppose to Shine"	2016	Lil Cali	Neighborhood Superstar
"Something Real"	2016	Peezy	Mud Sweat & Tears
"Kitchen Table"	2016	Fred the Godson, Jim Jones	Contraband 2
"#Mine"	2016	Lil' Kim	—N/a
"Where You Been"	2016	Wash	—N/a
"How I Do It"	2016	AR-Ab	—N/a
"Matamoros"	2016	Kharo	—N/a
"On Me"	2016	Prince Eazy	—N/a
"Type of Girl"	2016	Kosa	—N/a
"Emotions"	2016	Derez De'Shon	—N/a
"Cut It (Remix)"	2016	O.T. Genasis, Young Thug	—N/a
"Thuggin"	2016	Armani Depaul, Hatchet	—N/a
"All I Ever Wanted"	2016	BWA Ron, Zuse	—N/a
"Fade Away"	2016	Bezz Believe, Mook Boy	—N/a
"Paradise"	2016	Truth Denerio, InkMonstarr	—N/a
"Slo Motion (Reloaded)"	2016	Britizen Kane, Turkish Dcypha	—N/a
"Moonwalken (Remix)"	2016	Icewear Vezzo, OJ da Juiceman	—N/a
"Piss Codeine (Actavis)"	2016	Philthy Rich, Young Dolph, Icewear Vezzo	—N/a
"You Ain't Gang (Remix)"	2016	Lil Bibby, Dej Loaf, Lil Durk	—N/a
"Dollar Signs"	2016	Strap, Skooly, Phi, Spodee	Good Times
"DFA"	2016	Trademark da Skydiver, Young Roddy, Cozz	Family Business
"Burnxone"	2016	Tree Thomas, Iamsu!	Your Eyes
"Socialize"	2016	Chris Brown, Young Blacc, Young Lo	Before the Trap: Nights in Tarzana
"Save The Drama"	2016	Chris Brown, Tracy T	Before the Trap: Nights in Tarzana
"Like Me"	2016	YoungBoy Never Broke Again, Stroke Tha Don	38 Baby
"Wild One"	2017	DJ Kay Slay, 2 Chainz, Rick Ross, Meet Sims	The Big Brother
"Cold Summer"	2017	DJ Kay Slay, Mac Miller, Kendrick Lamar, Rell	The Big Brother
"Ridah"	2018	Mistah F.A.B., The Jacka	Thug Tears
"Light Show"	2018	Berner	Rico
"Ice On My Baby" (Remix)	2018	Yung Bleu	—N/a
"Down Bad"	2018	Lil Dallas, Seddy Hendrinx	—N/a
"Victim"	2018	Yowda	—N/a
"That's My N*gga"	2018	Marcus Black	—N/a
"Mine"	2018	TK Kravitz	—N/a
"Nolia"	2018	Lil Yachty	Nuthin' 2 Prove
"Fall Down"	2018	Moneybagg Yo, Rvssian	Reset
"Play With Us"	2018	Lil Durk	Signed to the Streets 3
"I'm Not Goin"	2018	Gucci Mane	Evil Genius
"Over It"	2018	Natasha Mosley	Live Forever
"What I Did"	2018	Yella Beezy	Ain't No Goin' Bacc
"I Do This On The Regular"	2019	DJ Kay Slay	Hip-Hop Frontline
"Old Me"	2019	OG Boo Dirty	The Story Of OG
"Let Me See"	2019	Juicy J, Lil Skies	—N/a
"Flewed Out"	2019	Kodie Shane	—N/a
"Drip 4 Extravaganza"	2019	Plies, Youngboy Never Broke Again	—N/a
"All the Time"	2019	Mr. Capone-E	—N/a
"Oouuh" (Remix)	2019	Fredo Bang	Big Ape
"Headstrong"	2019	Moneybagg Yo	43va Heartless
"Bad Intentions (Remix)"	2019	Ralo, Trouble	Free Ralo
"Pop Star"	2019	DaBaby	Kirk
"Bucking the System"	2019	Gucci Mane	Woptober II
"Titanic"	2019	Rod Wave	Ghetto Gospel
"Lifestyle"	2019	French Montana, Kodak Black	Montana
"Wide Awake"	2019	Project Pat, Keak da Sneak, Kafani, Mistah F.A.B.	Lean and Cookies
"Bandz"	2020	Destructo, Yo Gotti, Denzel Curry	—N/a
"Did What I Did (Remix)"	2020	Young Chop	—N/a
"They Don't F*ck With You"	2020	Lil Reese	—N/a
"Thankful"	2020	Mark Battles	—N/a
"Run It Up"	2020	WTO Sco, Nowwow	—N/a
"My Soul (Remix)"	2020	Young Moe	—N/a
"Broke My Heart"	2020	Blacc Zacc	803 Legend
"Apply Pressure"	2020	Merkules	Apply Pressure
"Amen"	2020	Kevo Muney	Leave Some Day (Muney Mix)
"Get Gangsta"	2020	OG Boobie Black, Beanie Sigel	Alvin
"Peer Pressure"	2020	JayDaYoungan	Baby23
"True Story"	2020	YFN Lucci	HIStory, Lost Pages
"No Option"	2020	Internet Money	B4 The Storm
"Water Zips"	2020	EST Gee	I Still Don't Feel Nun
"Ziploc"	2020	2 Chainz	So Help Me God!
"Hit Em Hard"	2021	Offset, Trippie Redd, Lil Durk, King Von	F9
"Ride da Night"	2021	Polo G, Teejay3K	F9
"Far Apart"	2021	YNW Melly, Lil Tjay	Just a Matter of Slime
"Hood"	2021	Colt Ford, Jermaine Dupri	Keys To the Country
"Thief In The Night"	2021	Masked Wolf	Astronomical
"Broken Love"	2021	MO3	Shottaz 4Eva
"4Reign Gangsta"	2021	GANG51E JUNE	This 2 Shall Pass
"When We Ride"	2021	Tokyo Jetz	Cancel Culture
"At"	2021	Renni Rucci	—N/a
"Boat to Virginia"	2021	Renni Rucci	—N/a
"Get 2 It"	2021	Psyco Sid, Boosie Badazz	—N/a
"Hustler V2"	2022	Rob49, Birdman	—N/a
"On Me"	2022	Young Freq, SPUD	—N/a
"Look At You"	2022	Mac Miller, Earl Sweatshirt	—N/a
"Switches in The Club (Remix)"	2022	Johnney C, Da Devil & PDE Escobar	—N/a
"Vibe Now 2"	2022	Loose Kannon Takeoff	—N/a
"Trying (Remix)"	2022	DJ Chose	—N/a
"Love Myself"	2022	DDG	It's Not Me It's You
"Brackz Yeah"	2022	Lul Bob	Guttah Baby
"CEO"	2023	Finesse2tymes	90 Days Later
"Active"	2023	T.I.	—N/a
"Lizzzo (Remix)"	2023	Moone Walker, Big Boogie	—N/a
“Habits”	2023	NLE Choppa	Cottonwood 2
“Devils Gate”	2023	Prof	Horse
"2 Wrongs"	2023	OMB Peezy	Le'Paris
“Ova”	2024	Blueface, TruCarr, YungMagnificent	—N/a
"Millions for My Pain"	2024	DeeBaby	—N/a
"ZOD (I Win I Always Win)"	2024	Tech N9ne, Snow Tha Product, Joey Cool, Tech N9ne Collabos	COSM
"Ring Ring"	2024	Fredo Bang	Yes, I'm Sad (More Therapy)
"From My Ex"	2025	T-Rell	—N/a
"Where I'm From"	2025	YunginReckless	—N/a
"Handguns & Assault Rifles"	2025	Dyor Chris	—N/a
"Trap Out"	2025	YoungBoy Never Broke Again	DESHAWN
"MAJIN BUU"	2025	ALLBLACK	MAJIN BUU
"AIGHT"	2025	Peysoh	FinallyFed
"Stroke U Up"	2026	Jeremih, MadMaxx	—N/a
"Sexy For Me (Remix)"	2026	Jason Derulo, Ibrahim Maalouf	—N/a
"Back In Dat Mode"	2026	Level, Mouse On Tha Track	
"Neighborhood Starz"	2026	Rylo Rodriguez, Lil Baby	S.K.A.T.E
"CRYBABY"	2026	BFB Da Packman	God Blessing All the Fat Niggas 2
