= 2016 in hip-hop =

This article summarizes the events, album releases, and album release dates in hip-hop for the year 2016.

== Events ==
=== January ===
- On January 20, Yasiin Bey (formerly known as Mos Def) was arrested in South Africa for allegedly using an unrecognized World Passport, thus having lived there illegally since 2014. Bey then released his newest freestyle via Kanye West's website for West's GOOD Fridays series, announcing he would soon be retiring from music and films, following his album.

=== February ===
- In February 2016, Future became the fastest artist (less than seven months) to chart three number-one albums (DS2, What a Time to Be Alive and Evol) on the Billboard 200 since Glee soundtrack albums in 2010.
- On February 3, American Hip Hop DJ Big Kap who was part of New York city DJ Group The Flip Squad died due to a fatal heart attack at the age of 45.
- On February 22, T.I. announced he signed a distribution deal with Jay Z's Roc Nation company. T.I. also revealed he is one of the new co-owners of online streaming service, TIDAL.

=== March ===
- On March 4, rapper Bankroll Fresh was shot and killed in Atlanta, Georgia.
- On March 22, rapper Phife Dawg from A Tribe Called Quest died from complications due to diabetes.

=== April ===
- On April 23, Beyonce released her second visual album Lemonade on HBO.

=== May ===
- On May 11, French Montana previewed a single called "No Shopping" featuring Drake, which ignited a feud between the latter and Joe Budden
- On May 26, rapper Gucci Mane was released from prison after serving two years for possession of a fire arm by a convicted Felon. He was slated to be released in September this year. The same day that rapper Troy Ave was involved in a shooting at Irving Plaza during a T.I. concert that left three people injured, including Troy Ave, and one dead. Footage later revealed Ave accidentally shot himself in the leg, his bodyguard BSB Banga, and two other people. He was later arrested for his role in the incident.

=== June ===
- On June 13, Lil Wayne suffered multiple seizures on a flight, which forced an emergency landing in Omaha, Nebraska. He was released from hospital a day later, recovering and in stable condition.
- On June 13, the 2016 XXL Freshman Class was revealed, consisting of 21 Savage, Lil Uzi Vert, Kodak Black, Lil Yachty, Lil Dicky, Denzel Curry, G Herbo, Dave East, Desiigner, and Anderson .Paak.
- On June 30, Joe Budden released his first of many diss records aimed at Drake entitled Making A Murderer Part 1

=== July ===
- On July 17, Kim Kardashian used Snapchat to expose Taylor Swift over the use of her name in the song "Famous" by Kanye West.

=== August ===
- On August 11, Young Buck was sentenced to seven months in prison for violating terms of his release and probation.
- On August 17, YG inked a multi-million-dollar deal with Interscope Records for his newly founded label 4Hunnid Records.
- On August 28, Teyana Taylor danced and starred in the video for "Fade" off Kanye West's The Life of Pablo album.

=== September ===
- On September 7, Kanye West announced that he had signed Tyga and Migos to GOOD Music. Though it was later noted that Migos' deal with GOOD Music is only a management deal, not a recording contract.
- On September 16, The Game released his first of many diss records aimed at Meek Mill.
- On September 21, Shawty Lo was killed in a single-car accident in Fulton County, Georgia.
- On September 30, Solange Knowles released A Seat at The Table featuring artists like Q-Tip, The-Dream, and Lil Wayne. This also marked the first #1 album of her career.

=== October ===
- On October 4, Kid Cudi announced that he has checked into rehab for depression and suicidal urges.
- On October 22, Beyoncé and her sister Solange Knowles made history by being added to a very short list of siblings with #1 albums on Billboards 200 list in the same calendar year.

=== November ===
- On November 20, Kanye West was committed into UCLA Medical Center for paranoia and hallucinations after cancelling the remainder of his Saint Pablo tour. He would go on to be released from the hospital on November 30.

=== December ===
- On December 5, Big Syke was pronounced dead. He was believed to have passed by natural causes, although his autopsy has never been released to the public.
- On December 23, Paul Wall and Baby Bash were arrested for delivering and manufacturing a controlled substance in Houston, Texas.

== Released albums ==
Release date	Artist(s)	Album	Record label(s)	Notes
January 1	Boosie Badazz	In My Feelings. (Goin' Thru It)	Lil Boosie Music	Debuted at No. 105 on the Billboard 200
January 15	Anderson .Paak	Malibu	Steel Wool, OBE, Art Club, Empire Distribution	Debuted at No. 79 on the Billboard 200; Singles: "The Season / Carry Me", "Am I Wrong", "Room in Here", "Come Down"
January 15	Blaze Ya Dead Homie	The Casket Factory	Majik Ninja Entertainment	Debuted at No. 89 on the Billboard 200
January 15	Daz Dillinger & Snoop Dogg	Cuzznz	Felder Entertainment	
January 15	Torae	Entitled	Internal Affairs Entertainment	Singles: "Saturday Night"
January 29	Beneficence	Basement Chemistry	Ill Adrenaline Records	Singles: "Digital Warfare"
January 29	Kevin Gates	Islah	Bread Winners' Association	Debuted at No. 2 on the Billboard 200; Singles: "Kno One", "La Familia", "The Truth", "Really Really", "2 Phones", "Jam"
January 29	PeeWee Longway	Mr. Blue Benjamin	MPA Bandcamp	Debuted at No. 39 on the Top R&B/Hip-Hop Albums
January 29	Saul Williams	MartyrLoserKing	Fader Label	Debuted at No. 37 on the Top R&B/Hip-Hop Albums
February 5	Boosie Badazz	Out My Feelings (In My Past)	Lil Boosie Music	Debuted at No. 57 on the Billboard 200
February 5	Dizzy Wright	Wisdom and Good Vibes	Dizzy Wright	Debuted at No. 24 on the Top R&B/Hip-Hop Albums
February 5	Trae tha Truth	Tha Truth, Pt. 2	ABN Entertainment, Hustle Gang, Empire Distribution	Debuted at No. 30 on the Top R&B/Hip-Hop Albums; Singles: "Takers", "All Good", "Slugs"
February 5	Wiz Khalifa	Khalifa	Taylor Gang Records, Atlantic Records, Rostrum Records	Debuted at No. 6 on the Billboard 200; Singles: "Bake Sale"
February 5	Young Thug	I'm Up	300 Entertainment, Atlantic Records	Debuted at No. 22 on the Billboard 200; Singles: "F Cancer", "For My People"
February 6	Future	Evol	A1, Freebandz, Epic Records	Debuted at No. 1 on the Billboard 200; Singles: "Low Life", "Wicked"
February 12	Statik Selektah & KXNG Crooked	Statik KXNG	Showoff Records, Penalty Entertainment	Singles: "Dead or in Jail"
February 13	Kaliber 44	Ułamek tarcia	Mystic Production	Debuted at No. 1 on the Polish charts; Certified Gold in Poland
February 14	Kanye West	The Life of Pablo	GOOD Music, Def Jam Recordings	Debuted at No. 1 on the Billboard 200; Singles: "Famous", "Father Stretch My Hands", "Fade"
February 18	Agallah	Bo: The Legend of the Water Dragon	Propain Campaign	
February 19	Brotha Lynch Hung	Bullet Maker	MadeSicc Muzicc	
February 19	Hilltop Hoods	Drinking from the Sun, Walking Under Stars Restrung	Golden Era Records	Debuted at No. 1 on the ARIA Australian Top 50 Albums; Singles: "Higher", "1955"
February 19	Yo Gotti	The Art of Hustle	CMG, Epic Records	Debuted at No. 4 on the Billboard 200; Singles: "Down in the DM"
February 19	Young Dolph	King of Memphis	Paper Route Empire	Debuted at No. 49 on the Billboard 200
February 25	Yung Lean	Warlord	YEAR0001	
February 26	Macklemore & Ryan Lewis	This Unruly Mess I've Made	Macklemore LLC	Debuted at No. 4 on the Billboard 200; Singles: "Downtown", "White Privilege II"
February 26	O.S.T.R.	Życie po śmierci	Asfalt Records	Debuted at No. 1 on the Polish charts; Certified Platinum in Poland
February 26	Philthy Rich	Real Niggas Back in Style	Empire Distribution, SCMMLLC	Singles: "Make a Living"
February 26	Rome Fortune	Jerome Raheem Fortune	Fool's Gold Records	Singles: "Dance"
March 4	2 Chainz	ColleGrove	Def Jam Recordings	Debuted at No. 4 on the Billboard 200
March 4	Bas	Too High to Riot	Dreamville Records, Interscope Records	Debuted at No. 49 on the Billboard 200
March 4	Kano	Made in the Manor	Parlophone, Bigger Picture Music	Debuted at No. 8 on the UK Albums Chart
March 4	Kendrick Lamar	Untitled Unmastered	Top Dawg Entertainment, Aftermath Entertainment, Interscope Records	Debuted at No. 1 on the Billboard 200; Singles: "Untitled 07 | levitate"
March 4	Smoke DZA	He Has Risen	SRFSCHL	
March 9	Lil Yachty	Lil Boat	Quality Control Music, Capitol Records, Motown	Debuted at No. 106 on the Billboard 200; Singles : "One Night", "Minnesota"
March 11	Flatbush Zombies	3001: A Laced Odyssey	Glorious Dead Recordings	Debuted at No. 10 on the Billboard 200; Singles: "Bounce", "This Is It"
March 11	Westside Gunn	FLYGOD	Griselda Records	
March 15	Joell Ortiz	That's Hip Hop	That's Hip Hop LLC	
March 16	Boosie Badazz	Thug Talk	Lil Boosie Music	Debuted at No. 130 on the Billboard 200
March 18	ILoveMakonnen	Drink More Water 6	Warner Bros	
March 25	Domo Genesis	Genesis	Odd Future Records	Debuted at No. 110 on the Billboard 200
March 25	Elzhi	Lead Poison	GLOW365LLC	
March 25	N.O.R.E.	Drunk Uncle	Militainment Business	
March 25	Open Mike Eagle & Paul White	Hella Personal Film Festival	Mello Music Group	
March 25	Planet Asia & DJ Concept	Seventy Nine	Coalmine Records	
March 25	Young Thug	Slime Season 3	300 Entertainment, Atlantic Records	
April 1	Big Sean & Jhené Aiko	Twenty88	GOOD Music, Artium Recordings, Def Jam Recordings	Debuted at No. 5 on the Billboard 200; Singles: "Selfish"
April 4	Black Milk & Nat Turner	The Rebellion Sessions	Computer Ugly Records	
April 7	Father	I'm A Piece of Shit	Awful Records	
April 8	Krizz Kaliko	GO	Strange Music	Debuted at No. 89 on the Billboard 200
April 8	Lex "The Hex" Master	The Black Season	Majik Ninja Entertainment	
April 8	Sir Michael Rocks	Part 2	6 Cell Phones	
April 15	Boosie Badazz & C-Murder	Penitentiary Chances	TRU Records, RBC Records	Debuted at No. 172 on the Billboard 200
April 15	J Dilla	The Diary	Pay Jay Productions, Inc., Mass Appeal Records	Debuted at No. 77 on the Billboard 200; Singles: "Fuck the Police", "The Anthem", "Diamonds", "Give Them What They Want", "The Introduction", "Gangsta Boogie"
April 15	Mr. Lif	Don't Look Down	Mello Music Group	
April 15	Royce da 5'9"	Layers	Bad Half Entertainment	Debuted at No. 22 on the Billboard 200
April 15	Lil Uzi Vert	Lil Uzi Vert vs. The World	Atlantic, Generation Now	• Debuted at No. 37 on the Billboard 200
April 22	ASAP Ferg	Always Strive and Prosper	ASAP Worldwide, Polo Grounds Music, RCA Records	Debuted at No. 8 on the Billboard 200; Singles: "New Level"
April 22	Bankroll Mafia	Bankroll Mafia	Bankroll Mafia, Empire Distribution	Singles: "Bankrolls on Deck", "Out My Face"
April 25	Young Noble of The Outlawz & Deuce Deuce of Concrete Mob	The Code	Concrete Enterprises, Outlaw Recordz	
April 29	Aesop Rock	The Impossible Kid	Rhymesayers Entertainment	Debuted at No. 30 on the Billboard 200
April 29	Chuck Inglish & Blended Babies	Ev Zeppelin	BBMG	
April 29	Drake	Views	Young Money Entertainment, Cash Money Records, Republic Records	Debuted at No. 1 on the Billboard 200; Singles: "Hotline Bling", "One Dance", "Pop Style", "Too Good"
April 29	Freeway	Free Will	Babygrande Records	
April 29	Stevie Joe & Mozzy	Extracurricular Activities	Green Carpet, Stevie Joe, Livewire, Rapbay, Urbanlife Distribution	
May 6	Death Grips	Bottomless Pit	Third Worlds, Harvest Records	
May 6	Homeboy Sandman	Kindness for Weakness	Stones Throw Records	
May 6	Rittz	Top of the Line	Strange Music	Debuted at No. 19 on the Billboard 200; Singles: "Ghost Story", "Propane", "Inside of the Groove"
May 6	Skepta	Konnichiwa	Boy Better Know	Debuted at No. 2 on the UK Albums Chart; Debuted at No. 160 on the Billboard 200
May 6	Yoni & Geti	Testarossa	Joyful Noise Recordings	
May 11	Boosie Badazz	Bleek Mode (Thug in Peace Lil Bleek)	Lil Boosie Music	
May 13	Masta Ace	The Falling Season	hhv.de	
May 13	Chance the Rapper	Coloring Book	Self-released	Debuted at No. 8 on the Billboard 200; Singles: "Angels", "No Problem", "Summer Friends"
May 20	Havoc & The Alchemist	The Silent Partner	Babygrande Records	
May 20	Webbie	Savage Life V	Trill Entertainment	Debuted at No. 153 on the Billboard 200
May 20	Zodiac MPrint (Blaze Ya Dead Homie & The R.O.C.)	Ride the Stars	Majik Ninja Entertainment	
May 27	Kevin Gates	Murder for Hire 2	Bread Winners' Association, Atlantic Records	
May 27	Mistah F.A.B.	Son of a Pimp Part 2	Faeva Afta, Empire Distribution	Debuted at No. 24 on the Top R&B/Hip-Hop Albums
June 3	Craig G	I Rap and Go Home	Soulspazm, Inc.	
June 3	Juicy J, Wiz Khalifa & TM88	TGOD Mafia: Rude Awakening	Atlantic Records, Columbia Records, Empire Distribution	Debuted at No. 26 on the Billboard 200; Singles: "All Night"
June 3	Vic Mensa	There's Alot Going On	Roc Nation	Debuted at No. 127 on the Billboard 200
June 10	Apathy	Handshakes with Snakes	Dirty Version LLC	
June 10	Ill Bill	Septagram	Uncle Howie Records	
June 10	Lil Peep	Crybaby	AUTMNY	Debuted at No. 102 on the Billboard 200
June 11	Kodak Black	Lil B.I.G. Pac	Dollaz N Dealz Entertainment, Sniper Gang	
June 17	The Game	Streets of Compton	Entertainment One Music	Debuted at No. 25 on the Billboard 200; Singles: "Roped Off"
June 17	YG	Still Brazy	Def Jam Recordings, CTE World, Pu$haz Ink	Debuted at No. 6 on the Billboard 200; Singles: "Twist My Fingaz", "FDT", "Why You Always Hatin?"
June 24	Demrick	Collect Call	10 Strip Inc.	
June 24	DJ Shadow	The Mountain Will Fall	Reconstruction Productions	Debuted at No. 77 on the Billboard 200
June 24	Riff Raff	Peach Panther	Neon Nation Corporation	Debuted at No. 69 on the Billboard 200
June 24	Ugly Heroes (Apollo Brown, Red Pill & Verbal Kent)	Everything in Between	Mello Music Group	
July 1	Reef the Lost Cauze & Bear-One	Furious Styles	Soulspazm, Inc.	
July 1	Snoop Dogg	Coolaid	Doggystyle Records, Entertainment One Music	Debuted at No. 40 on the Billboard 200; Singles: "Kush Ups", "Point Seen Money Gone"
July 8	Bernz	See You on the Other Side	Strange Music	Debuted at No. 13 on the Top R&B/Hip-Hop Albums
July 8	ScHoolboy Q	Blank Face LP	Top Dawg Entertainment, Interscope Records	Debuted at No. 2 on the Billboard 200; Singles: "Groovy Tony", "That Part"
July 15	Blu & Nottz	Titans in the Flesh	Coalmine Records	
July 15	Dreezy	No Hard Feelings	Interscope Records	
July 15	Flowdan	Disaster Piece	Tru Thoughts	
July 15	Sadat X	Agua	Tommy Boy Entertainment	
July 15	Z-Ro	Drankin' & Drivin'	1 Deep Entertainment	Debuted at No. 99 on the Billboard 200
July 15	21 Savage & Metro Boomin	Savage Mode	Self-released	Debuted at No. 23 on the Billboard 200; Singles: "X ft. Future", "No Heart"
July 22	DJ Drama	Quality Street Music 2	Entertainment One Music	Debuted at No. 40 on the Billboard 200
July 22	Gucci Mane	Everybody Looking	Guwop Enterprises, Atlantic Records	Debuted at No. 2 on the Billboard 200
July 22	Jarren Benton	Slow Motion, Vol. 2	Benton Enterprises	
July 22	Lil Durk	Lil Durk 2X	OTF, Coke Boys, Def Jam Recordings	Debuted at No. 29 on the Billboard 200
July 29	DJ Khaled	Major Key	We the Best Music Group, Epic Records	Debuted at No. 1 on the Billboard 200; Singles: "For Free", "I Got the Keys", "Do You Mind"
July 29	The Game	Block Wars	Entertainment One Music	Debuted at No. 22 on the Top R&B/Hip-Hop Albums
July 29	Mitchy Slick	Lost in the Yay	Wrongkind Records	
August 5	Giggs	Landlord	SN1 Records	
August 5	Slim Thug	Hogg Life Vol. 4: American King	Hogg Life	Debuted at No. 179 on the Billboard 200
August 12	Atmosphere	Fishing Blues	Rhymesayers Entertainment	Debuted at No. 22 on the Billboard 200
August 12	PartyNextDoor	PartyNextDoor 3	OVO Sound, Warner Bros. Records	Debuted at No. 3 on the Billboard 200
August 12	Rae Sremmurd	SremmLife 2	EarDrummers Entertainment, Interscope Records	Debuted at No. 7 on the Billboard 200; Singles: "By Chance", "Over Here", "Look Alive", "Black Beatles"
August 13	Ka	Honor Killed the Samurai	Iron Works	
August 19	Bishop Lamont	The Reformation: G.D.N.I.A.F.T.	Bishop Lamont	
August 19	Tory Lanez	I Told You	Mad Love, Interscope Records	Debuted at No. 4 on the Billboard 200; Singles: "Say It", "Luv"
August 20	Frank Ocean	Blonde	Boys Don't Cry	Debuted at No. 1 on the Billboard 200; Singles: "Nikes"
August 25	Vince Staples	Prima Donna	ARTium Recordings, Def Jam Recordings	Debuted at No. 50 on the Billboard 200
August 26	Banks & Steelz	Anything But Words	Warner Bros. Records	Debuted at No. 186 on the Billboard 200
August 26	De La Soul	And the Anonymous Nobody...	A.O.I. Records	Debuted at No. 12 on the Billboard 200
August 26	Futuristic	As Seen on the Internet	We're The Future Records	Debuted at No. 116 on the Billboard 200
August 26	Prophets of Rage	The Party's Over	Prophets of Rage	Debuted at No. 84 on the Billboard 200
August 26	The R.O.C.	The F**king Prey Lewd EP	Majik Ninja Entertainment	
August 26	Red Pill	Instinctive Drowning	Mello Music Group	
August 26	Young Thug	Jeffery	300 Entertainment, Atlantic Records	Debuted at No. 8 on the Billboard 200; Singles: "Pick Up the Phone"
August 29	3D Na'Tee	The Regime	Already Legendary	
September 2	Isaiah Rashad	The Sun's Tirade	Top Dawg Entertainment	Debuted at No. 17 on the Billboard 200; Singles: "Free Lunch"
September 2	Travis Scott	Birds in the Trap Sing McKnight	Grand Hustle Records, Epic Records	Debuted at No. 1 on the Billboard 200; Singles: "Wonderful", "Pick Up the Phone", "Goosebumps"
September 9	clipping.	Splendor & Misery	Sub Pop, Deathbomb Arc	
September 9	Fudge	Lady Parts	Lex	
September 9	Ras Kass	Intellectual Property: SOI2	That's Hip Hop LLC	
September 9	Reks	The Greatest X	Brick Records	
September 13	Young Noble of The Outlawz	Powerful	Outlaw Recordz	
September 16	Caskey	No Apologies	Cash Money Records	
September 16	Chinx	Legends Never Die	Entertainment One Music	Debuted at No. 121 on the Billboard 200
September 16	Kool Keith	Feature Magnetic	Mello Music Group	
September 16	Mac Miller	The Divine Feminine	REMember Music, Warner Bros. Records	Debuted at No. 2 on the Billboard 200
September 16	Mykki Blanco	Mykki	Dogfood Music Group, Studio !K7	
September 20	OG Maco	Blvk Phil Collins	OG Maco	
September 23	Audio Push	90951	Good Vibe Tribe	
September 23	Mick Jenkins	The Healing Component	Free Nation, Cinematic Music Group	Debuted at No. 110 on the Billboard 200
September 23	Slaine	Slaine Is Dead	AR Classic Records, Perfect Time Publishing	
September 23	Ty Dolla Sign	Campaign	Taylor Gang Records, Atlantic Records	Debuted at No. 28 on the Billboard 200; Singles: "Campaign", "No Justice", "Zaddy"
September 23	T.I.	Us or Else	Grand Hustle Records, Roc Nation	Debuted at No. 175 on the Billboard 200; Singles: "We Will Not", "Warzone"
September 27	Danny Brown	Atrocity Exhibition	Warp	Debuted at No. 77 on the Billboard 200; Singles: "When It Rain", "Pneumonia", "Really Doe"
September 30	Apollo Brown & Skyzoo	The Easy Truth	Mello Music Group	Debuted at No. 25 on the Top R&B/Hip-Hop Albums
September 30	Dave East	Kairi Chanel	Mass Appeal Records	Debuted at No. 38 on the Billboard 200
September 30	DJ Mustard	Cold Summer	Roc Nation	Debuted at No. 24 on the Top R&B/Hip-Hop Albums
October 7	Brookzill	Throwback To The Future	Tommy Boy	
October 14	The Game	1992	Blood Money Entertainment, Entertainment One Music	Debuted at No. 4 on the Billboard 200; Singles: "All Eyez"
October 14	Gucci Mane	Woptober	Atlantic Records	Debuted at No. 43 on the Billboard 200
October 14	L'Orange & Mr. Lif	The Life & Death of Scenery	Mello Music Group	
October 17	Bones	GoodForNothing	TeamSESH	
October 18	Gawne	Wings	GAWNE LLC	
October 20	Kuniva	A History of Violence 2	Runyon Ave. Publishing	
October 21	DRAM	Big Baby D.R.A.M.	Atlantic Records, Empire Distribution	Debuted at No. 19 on the Billboard 200; Singles: "Broccoli"
October 21	Joe Budden	Rage & The Machine	Mood Muzik Entertainment, Empire Distribution	Debuted at No. 40 on the Billboard 200
October 21	NxWorries	Yes Lawd!	Stones Throw Records	Debuted at No. 59 on the Billboard 200
October 21	Paul Wall	The Houston Oiler	Paul Wall Music	
October 21	Zion I	The Labyrinth	Mind Over Matter	
October 25	Riff Raff	Balloween	Neon Nation Corporation, Empire Distribution	
October 28	D.I.T.C.	Sessions	D.I.T.C. Studios, The Fam Agency	
October 28	DJ Paul	Y.O.T.S. (Year of the Six), Pt. 1	Slumerican, Scale-A-Ton Ent.	
October 28	Jeezy	Trap or Die 3	Def Jam Recordings, CTE World	Debuted at No. 1 on the Billboard 200
October 28	Journalist 103	Battle of the Hearts and Minds	Babygrande Records	
October 28	KXNG Crooked	Valley of the KXNGS	RBC Records	
October 28	Meek Mill	DC4	Maybach Music Group, Dream Chaser Records, Atlantic Records	Debuted at No. 3 on the Billboard 200
October 28	Mickey Factz & Nottz	The Achievement: circa '82	Soulspazm, W.A.R. Media	
October 28	Vinnie Paz	The Cornerstone of the Corner Store	Enemy Soil	Debuted at No. 12 on the Top R&B/Hip-Hop Albums
October 31	ASAP Mob	Cozy Tapes Vol. 1: Friends	ASAP Worldwide, Polo Grounds Music, RCA Records	Debuted at No. 13 on the Billboard 200; Singles: "Yamborghini High", "Crazy Brazy", "Runner", "Telephone Calls"
November 4	Big Scoob	H.O.G.	Strange Music	Debuted at No. 16 on the Top R&B/Hip-Hop Albums
November 4	B.o.B	Elements	No Genre	
November 4	Common	Black America Again	ARTium Recordings, Def Jam Recordings	Debuted at No. 25 on the Billboard 200; Singles: "Love Star"
November 4	Czarface	A Fistful of Peril	Silver Age	Debuted at No. 21 on the Top R&B/Hip-Hop Albums
November 4	French Montana	MC4	Coke Boys Records, Bad Boy Records, Maybach Music Group, Epic Records	
November 4	La Coka Nostra	To Thine Own Self Be True	Fat Beats Records	Debuted at No. 38 on the Top R&B/Hip-Hop Albums
November 5	Bones	SoftwareUpdate1.0	TeamSESH	
November 11	A Tribe Called Quest	We Got It from Here... Thank You 4 Your Service	Epic Records	Debuted at No. 1 on the Billboard 200
November 11	KXNG Crooked	Good vs. Evil	RBC Records	
November 11	Lex "The Hex" Master	Contact	Majik Ninja Entertainment	
November 11	Z-Ro	Legendary	1 Deep Entertainment	Debuted at No. 15 on the Top R&B/Hip-Hop Albums
November 15	K-Rino	Universal Curriculum (The Big Seven #1)	Black Book International, SoSouth	
November 15	K-Rino	Conception of Concept (The Big Seven #2)	Black Book International, SoSouth	
November 15	K-Rino	Enter the Iron Trap (The Big Seven #3)	Black Book International, SoSouth	
November 15	K-Rino	Wizard's Ransom (The Big Seven #4)	Black Book International, SoSouth	
November 15	K-Rino	American Heroes (The Big Seven #5)	Black Book International, SoSouth	
November 15	K-Rino	Welcome to Life (The Big Seven #6)	Black Book International, SoSouth	
November 15	K-Rino	Intervention (The Big Seven #7)	Black Book International, SoSouth	
November 18	E-40	The D-Boy Diary: Book 1	Heavy on the Grind Entertainment	Debuted at No. 178 on the Billboard 200
November 18	E-40	The D-Boy Diary: Book 2	Heavy on the Grind Entertainment	Debuted at No. 14 on the Top R&B/Hip-Hop Albums
November 18	Kerser	Tradition	ABK, Warner Music Australia	Debuted at No. 4 on the ARIA Australian Top 50 Albums
November 18	Outlawz	Livin Legendz	Black Market Records	
November 18	Termanology	More Politics	ShowOff Records, ST. Records	
November 25	Emanon	Dystopia	Dirty Science Records	
December 2	Childish Gambino	"Awaken, My Love!"	Glassnote Records	Debuted at No. 5 on the Billboard 200; Singles: "Me and Your Mama"
December 2	Smoke DZA & Pete Rock	Don't Smoke Rock	Babygrande Records	Debuted at No. 26 on the Top R&B/Hip-Hop Albums
December 8	Planet Asia	Egyptian Merchandise	Gold Chain Music	
December 9	Ab-Soul	Do What Thou Wilt.	Top Dawg Entertainment	Debuted at No. 34 on the Billboard 200; Singles: "Huey Knew", "Braille"
December 9	Charles Hamilton	Hamilton, Charles	Republic Records	
December 9	CJ Fly	Flytrap	Pro Era, Cinematic Music Group	Singles: "Now You Know"
December 9	Hodgy	Fireplace: TheNotTheOtherSide	Odd Future, Columbia	
December 9	6LACK	Free 6LACK	Love Renaissance, Interscope Records	
December 9	J. Cole	4 Your Eyez Only	Dreamville, Roc Nation, Interscope	Debuted at No. 1 on the Billboard 200
December 9	Post Malone	Stoney	Republic Records	Debuted at No. 6 on the Billboard 200; Singles: "White Iverson", "Too Young, "Go Flex", "Deja Vu"
December 9	Tech N9ne	The Storm	Strange Music	Debuted at No. 12 on the Billboard 200
December 10	B-Nasty	The End of the Beginning	Dough Related Productions	
December 12	Snowgoons	Goon Bap	Goon MuSick	
December 15	Injury Reserve	Floss	Las Fuegas	
December 16	Gucci Mane	The Return of East Atlanta Santa	Guwop Enterprises, Atlantic Records	Debuted at No. 16 on the Billboard 200; Singles: "Last Time", "Drove U Crazy", "Both"
December 16	Kid Cudi	Passion, Pain & Demon Slayin'	Wicked Awesome, Republic Records	Debuted at No. 11 on the Billboard 200; Singles: "Frequency", "Surfin'"
December 16	Little Simz	Stillness In Wonderland	Age 101 Music	
December 16	The Lox	Filthy America... It's Beautiful	D-Block Records, Roc Nation	Debuted at No. 42 on the Billboard 200
December 16	T.I.	Us or Else: Letter to the System	Grand Hustle Records, Roc Nation	Debuted at No. 39 on the Top R&B/Hip-Hop Albums
December 21	Dec 99th	December 99th	AWGE/A Country Called Earth	
December 23	Berner	Packs	Bern One Entertainment	
December 23	Dom Kennedy	Los Angeles Is Not for Sale, Vol. 1	The Other People's Money	Debuted at No. 42 on the Top R&B/Hip-Hop Albums
December 25	Run the Jewels	Run the Jewels 3	Run the Jewels, Inc.	Debuted at No. 35 on the Billboard 200; Singles: "Talk to Me", "2100", "Legend Has It"

== Highest-charting singles ==
Hip hop singles which charted in the Top 40 of the Billboard Hot 100
Song	Artist	Peak position
"Panda"	Desiigner	1
"One Dance"	Drake featuring Wizkid and Kyla	1
"Black Beatles"	Rae Sremmurd featuring Gucci Mane	1
"My House"	Flo Rida	4
"Broccoli"	DRAM featuring Lil Yachty	5
"Juju on That Beat (TZ Anthem)"	Zay Hilfigerrr & Zayion McCall	5
"Summer Sixteen"	Drake	6
"Me, Myself & I"	G-Eazy and Bebe Rexha	7
"Deja Vu"	J. Cole	7
"Don't Mind"	Kent Jones	8
"Immortal"	J. Cole	11
"For Free"	DJ Khaled featuring Drake	13
"Neighbors"	J. Cole	13
"Down in the DM (Remix)"	Yo Gotti featuring Nicki Minaj	13
"Too Good"	Drake featuring Rihanna	14
"Used to This"	Future featuring Drake	14
"White Iverson"	Post Malone	14
"Sucker for Pain"	Lil Wayne, Wiz Khalifa and Imagine Dragons with Logic, Ty Dolla $ign and X Ambassadors	15
"Controlla"	Drake	16
"Pop Style"	Drake featuring The Throne	16
"2 Phones"	Kevin Gates	17
"Low Life"	Future featuring The Weeknd	18
"Luv"	Tory Lanez	19
"Ooouuu"	Young M.A	19
"Change"	J. Cole	21
"She's Mine Pt. 1"	J. Cole	22
"For Whom the Bell Tolls"	J. Cole	23
"Say It"	Tory Lanez	23
"Ville Mentality"	J. Cole	24
"Do You Mind"	DJ Khaled featuring Nicki Minaj, Chris Brown, August Alsina, Jeremih, Future and Rick Ross	27
"My Boo"	Ghost Town DJ's	27
"All the Way Up (Remix)"	Fat Joe, Remy Ma and Jay Z featuring French Montana and Infared	27
"Sneakin'"	Drake featuring 21 Savage	28
"4 Your Eyez Only"	J. Cole	29
"Chill Bill"	Rob Stone featuring J. Davi$ and Spooks	29
"I Got the Keys"	DJ Khaled featuring Jay Z and Future	30
"Foldin Clothes"	J. Cole	30
"Hype"	Drake	33
"Purple Lamborghini"	Skrillex and Rick Ross	33
"Tiimmy Turner"	Desiigner	34
"She's Mine Pt. 2"	J. Cole	34
"Famous"	Kanye West	34
"Cut It"	O.T. Genasis featuring Young Dolph	35
"No Shopping"	French Montana featuring Drake	36
"X"	21 Savage and Metro Boomin featuring Future	36
"No Role Modelz"	J. Cole	36
"Father Stretch My Hands Pt. 1"	Kanye West	37
"Grammys"	Drake featuring Future	38
"Still Here"	Drake	40
"THat Part"	ScHoolboy Q featuring Kanye West	40

== Highest first-week consumption ==
List of top 10 albums with the highest first-week consumption (sales + streaming + track equivalent), as of November 2016 in the US.
Number	Album	Artist	1st-week consumption	1st-week position	Refs
1	Views	Drake	1,040,000	1	
2	4 Your Eyez Only	J. Cole	492,000	1	
3	untitled unmastered.	Kendrick Lamar	178,000	1	
4	We Got It from Here... Thank You 4 Your Service	A Tribe Called Quest	135,000	1	
5	Evol	Future	134,000	1	
6	Islah	Kevin Gates	112,000	2	
7	Major Key	DJ Khaled	95,000	1	
8	The Life of Pablo	Kanye West	94,000	1	
9	Trap or Die 3	Jeezy	89,000	1	
10	Birds in the Trap Sing McKnight	Travis Scott	88,000	1	

== All critically reviewed albums Ranked ==
=== Metacritic ===
Number	Artist	Album	Average score	Number of reviews	Reference
1	A Tribe Called Quest	We Got It from Here... Thank You 4 Your Service	91	26 reviews	
2	Chance the Rapper	Coloring Book	89	21 reviews	
3	Run the Jewels	Run the Jewels 3	88	34 reviews	
4	Common	Black America Again	88	14 reviews	
5	Danny Brown	Atrocity Exhibition	85	31 reviews	
6	Anderson .Paak	Malibu	85	18 reviews	
7	Aesop Rock	The Impossible Kid	85	11 reviews	
8	Little Simz	Stillness In Wonderland	84	7 reviews	
9	Noname	Telefone	84	6 reviews	
10	Skepta	Konnichiwa	83	18 reviews	
11	YG	Still Brazy	83	14 reviews	
12	Young Thug	Jeffery	82	11 reviews	
13	Boosie Badazz	Out My Feelings in My Past	82	4 reviews	
14	ScHoolboy Q	Blank Face LP	81	18 reviews	
15	Kevin Gates	Islah	81	10 reviews	
16	Smoke DZA & Pete Rock	Don't Smoke Rock	81	4 reviews	
17	Shelley FKA DRAM	Big Baby D.R.A.M.	80	13 reviews	
18	Death Grips	Bottomless Pit	80	11 reviews	
19	Isaiah Rashad	The Sun's Tirade	80	11 reviews	
20	Swet Shop Boys	Cashmere	80	8 reviews	
21	Flatbush Zombies	3001: A Laced Odyssey	80	7 reviews	
22	Giggs	Landlord	80	4 reviews	
23	Open Mike Eagle & Paul White	Hella Personal Film Festival	79	9 reviews	
24	Mick Jenkins	The Healing Component	79	7 reviews	
25	Saul Williams	MartyrLoserKing	78	17 reviews	
26	A$AP Mob	Cozy Tapes Vol. 1: Friends	78	4 reviews	
27	De La Soul	And the Anonymous Nobody...	77	28 reviews	
28	Childish Gambino	Awaken, My Love!	77	25 reviews	
29	Mykki Blanco	Mykki	77	14 reviews	
30	Royce da 5'9"	Layers	77	6 reviews	
31	Freeway	Free Will	77	4 reviews	
32	Young Thug	Slime Season 3	76	11 reviews	
33	Young Thug	I'm Up	76	11 reviews	
34	clipping.	Splendor & Misery	76	11 reviews	
35	Yoni & Geti	Testarossa	76	4 reviews	
36	Kanye West	The Life of Pablo	75	35 reviews	
37	J. Cole	4 Your Eyez Only	75	14 reviews	
38	Rae Sremmurd	SremmLife 2	75	13 reviews	
39	Azealia Banks	Slay-Z	75	7 reviews	
40	Kool Keith	Feature Magnetic	75	6 reviews	
41	Flowdan	Disaster Piece	75	5 reviews	
42	A$AP Ferg	Always Strive and Prosper	74	15 reviews	
43	Fudge	Lady Parts	74	7 reviews	
44	Yo Gotti	The Art of Hustle	74	6 reviews	
45	Lil Durk	Lil Durk 2X	74	5 reviews	
46	J Dilla	The Diary	73	18 reviews	
47	Dreezy	No Hard Feelings	73	5 reviews	
48	Banks & Steelz	Anything But Words	72	13 reviews	
49	Gucci Mane	Everybody Looking	72	13 reviews	
50	Boosie Badazz	In My Feelings (Goin' Thru It)	72	4 reviews	
51	Atmosphere	Fishing Blues	71	7 reviews	
52	Kevin Gates	Murder For Hire II	71	4 reviews	
53	Kid Cudi	Passion, Pain & Demon Slayin'	70	11 reviews	
54	Mac Miller	The Divine Feminine	70	9 reviews	
55	Domo Genesis	Genesis	70	6 reviews	
56	Jeezy	Trap or Die 3	70	5 reviews	
57	Gucci Mane	The Return of East Atlanta Santa	70	4 reviews	
58	Young Dolph	King of Memphis	70	4 reviews	
59	Drake	Views	69	31 reviews	
60	Gucci Mane	Woptober	69	6 reviews	
61	Brookzill	Throwback To The Future	69	6 reviews	
62	Hodgy	Fireplace: TheNotTheOtherSide	69	5 reviews	
63	Future	EVOL	68	17 reviews	
64	Snoop Dogg	Coolaid	68	8 reviews	
65	DJ Khaled	Major Key	67	11 reviews	
66	Kano	Made in the Manor	67	10 reviews	
67	French Montana	MC4	67	4 reviews	
68	DJ Shadow	The Mountain Will Fall	66	26 reviews	
69	2 Chainz	ColleGrove	66	9 reviews	
70	ILoveMakonnen	Drink More Water 6	65	5 reviews	
71	Travis Scott	Birds in the Trap Sing McKnight	64	8 reviews	
72	Ab-Soul	Do What Thou Wilt	64	6 reviews	
73	Kodak Black	Lil B.I.G. Pac	64	6 reviews	
74	Desiigner	New English	60	5 reviews	
75	Macklemore & Ryan Lewis	This Unruly Mess I've Made	59	17 reviews	
76	Wiz Khalifa	Khalifa	56	7 reviews	

=== AnyDecentMusic? ===
Number	Artist	Album	Average score	Number of reviews	Reference
1	A Tribe Called Quest	We Got It from Here... Thank You 4 Your Service	8.4	23 reviews	
2	Chance the Rapper	Coloring Book	8.2	21 reviews	
3	Danny Brown	Atrocity Exhibition	8.1	28 reviews	
4	Anderson .Paak	Malibu	8.0	15 reviews	
5	Skepta	Konnichiwa	7.9	20 reviews	

== See also ==
- Previous article: 2015 in hip-hop
- Next article: 2017 in hip-hop
