= Luca Brasi (disambiguation) =

Luca Brasi is a fictional character in the 1969 novel The Godfather by Mario Puzo.

Luca Brasi may also refer to:

- Luca Brasi 2, a 2014 mixtape by Kevin Gates
- Luca Brasi 3, a 2018 mixtape by Kevin Gates
- Luca Brasi (band), an Australian punk rock band

== See also ==
- Luca Braidot, an Italian mountain bike racer
