= Lim Chwee Teck =

Singaporean researcher and entrepreneur

Lim Chwee Teck FRS FREng
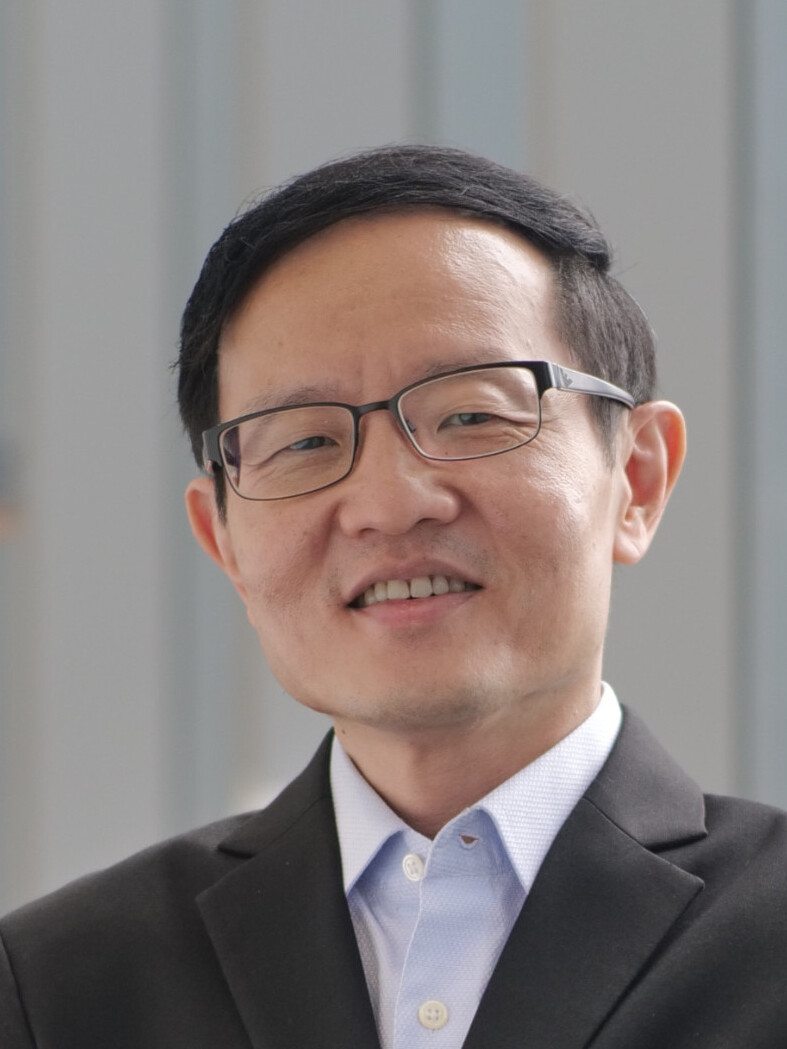
- Born: Singapore
- Education: National University of Singapore (BEng (First Class Honours)); University of Cambridge (PhD)
- Scientific career
- Fields: Mechanobiology; Cell Mechanics; Microfluidics; Circulating Biomarkers; Flexible electronics
- Workplaces: National University of Singapore
- Website: cde.nus.edu.sg/bme/staff/dr-limchweeteck

Lim Chwee Teck is a Singaporean researcher, inventor and entrepreneur. He is a specialist in human disease mechanobiology and in developing microfluidic and wearable technologies for healthcare applications and bringing them from the laboratory to the bedside.

== Education ==
Lim was educated at the University of Cambridge where he was awarded a PhD.

== Career and research ==
He is the Distinguished Professor and Director of the Institute for Health Innovation & Technology (iHealthtech) (2018–present) at the National University of Singapore (NUS), and Founding Director of the Singapore Health Technologies Consortium (HealthTEC). He is also an elected Member/Fellow of the U.S. National Academy of Engineering,, Royal Society (UK), Royal Academy of Engineering (UK), International Union for Physical and Engineering Sciences in Medicine, US National Academy of Inventors, American Institute for Medical and Biological Engineering, the International Academy of Medical and Biological Engineering, ASEAN Academy of Engineering and Technology, the Academy of Engineering (Singapore), the Singapore National Academy of Science, Institution of Engineers (Singapore) and an elected Council Member of the World Council of Biomechanics (2010–2022).

Lim's research interests include human disease mechanobiology, microfluidic technologies for disease diagnosis and precision therapy, and soft wearable technologies for biomedical applications. He currently heads the MechanoBioEngineering Laboratory at NUS. He co-authored more than 500 peer-reviewed journal publications including in high impact journals, for example Nature, Nature Materials, Nature Physics among others.

Lim is internationally known for his interdisciplinary approach in combining mechanics with biology and medicine to obtain fundamental insights into how adverse changes in the mechanical properties of cells and tissues can lead to the pathology of diseases (mechanopathology) such as malaria and cancer.

Lim leverages basic research outcomes and his expertise in engineering to develop biomedical technologies for disease diagnosis, prognosis and precision therapy. Some of his biomedical microfluidic technologies have been commercialised by startups that he has cofounded.

One example involves a biochips to better detect and diagnose cancer. These microfluidic chips are among the world's first in being able to isolate circulating tumor cells from patient's blood. This patented technology is simple and easy to use, providing a next generation of non-invasive 'liquid biopsy' devices for cancer diagnosis. The key innovation involved cancer cells being captured and analysed from a routine blood draw rather than through the painful route of needle aspiration tumour biopsy. This technology has since been commercialized by Biolidics Limited which he co-founded in 2009 and which IPO in 2018. The technology has also obtained CE (IVD) certification as well as FDA listing in both China and the USA.

He and his team have also received numerous awards and accolades including the President's Science Award 2025, Otto Schmitt Award 2025, Nature Award for Mentoring in Science (Lifetime Achievement) 2022, Highly Cited Researcher 2022, IES Prestigious Engineering Achievement Award 2022, Asia's Most Influential Scientist Award, Fortune Times 2021, IP Champion, WIPO-IPOS IP Awards 2019, TIE50 Award (world's top 50 startups) 2014, Credit Suisse Technopreneur of the Year Award 2012, Wall Street Journal Asian Innovation Awards 2012 (Gold Award), Asian Entrepreneurship Award 2012 (First Prize), President's Technology Award 2011 among others.

=== Leadership ===
Lim is Director of the Institute for Health Innovation and Technology (iHealhtech) at the National University of Singapore.

Lim was the Founding Director of the Singapore Health Technologies Consortium (HealthTEC.SG) which comprises a network of over 70 health and medical technology companies with the aim of promoting closer research collaboration and quicker transfer of knowledge and research outcomes from academia to industry. HealthTEC.SG is supported by the National Research Foundation.

=== Entrepreneurship ===
Lim has co-founded seven spin-off companies such as Biolidics (IPO in 2018), Microtube Technologies and Flexosense that are commercialising technologies developed in his laboratory.

=== Awards and honors ===
- Public Administration Medal (Bronze), Singapore, 2026.
- Eric Reissner Medal, ICCES 2026.
- Savio Woo Distinguished Lecture Award, WACBE 2026.
- Asian Scientist 100, 2026.
- Elected International Member of the US National Academy of Engineering, 2026.
- President's Science Award 2025.
- Distinguished Alumni Award 2025.
- Otto Schmitt Award 2025.
- Elected Fellow of the Royal Academy of Engineering (FREng), 2025.
- Elected Fellow of the Royal Society (FRS), 2024.
- Elected Fellow, Institution of Engineers, Singapore, 2023.
- Elected Fellow, International Union for Physical and Engineering Sciences in Medicine, 2022.
- Nature Award for Mentoring in Science (Lifetime Achievement), 2022.
- Highly Cited Researcher, 2018, 2019, 2021.
- Elected Fellow, ASEAN Academy of Engineering and Technology, 2021.
- Asia's Most Influential Scientist Award, Fortune Times, 2021.
- IES Prestigious Engineering Achievement Award 2021.
- Elected Fellow, Singapore National Academy of Science, 2019.
- HFSP Award 2018.
- ASEAN Outstanding Engineering Achievement Award 2016.
- Elected Fellow, International Academy of Medical and Biological Engineering, 2016.
- Elected Fellow, American Institute for Medical and Biological Engineering, 2016.
- 14 inspiring innovators from Asia, Asian Scientist, 2016.
- IES Prestigious Engineering Achievement Award, 2016.
- Asian Scientist 100, 2016 and 2024.
- Seven Scientists from Singapore to Watch, Asian Scientist, 2016.
- Elected Fellow, Academy of Engineering, Singapore, 2015.
- Vladimir K. Zworykin Award, 2015.
- Outstanding Researcher Award, NUS University Awards, 2014.
- President's Technology Award 2011.
- IES Prestigious Engineering Achievement Award, 2010.
- Cited in “MIT Technology Review: 10 Emerging Technologies and their impact”, 2006.
