= By Any Means 2 =

By Any Means 2 may refer to:

- Right to the Edge: Sydney to Tokyo by Any Means, also known by the working title By Any Means 2, a 2009 adventure series
- By Any Means 2 (mixtape), a mixtape by Kevin Gates
