= I Don't Get Tired =

Single by Kevin Gates featuring August Alsina

from the album Luca Brasi 2
- Released: December 20, 2014
- Recorded: 2014
- Genre: Hip hop; R&B
- Length: 3:30
- Label: Atlantic
- Songwriters: Kevin Gilyard; August Alsina; Nicholas Balding
- Producers: Nic Nac; Dsap Beats

Kevin Gates singles chronology
"Amnesia" (2014)	"I Don't Get Tired" (2014)	"Kno One" (2015)

August Alsina singles chronology
"No Love" (2014)	"I Don't Get Tired" (2014)	"Hip-Hop" (2015)

"I Don't Get Tired" is a song by American hip hop recording artist Kevin Gates, and features American singer August Alsina. It was released on December 20, 2014, as a single from his mixtape Luca Brasi 2. This song peaked at number 90 on the US Billboard Hot 100 in May 2015.

In 2014, Gates launched an energy drink under the same name following the track's popularity. A pineapple flavour was also produced.

The song was featured on the soundtrack of the comedy film Keanu.

== Music video ==
The song's accompanying music video premiered on December 20, 2014, on Gates's YouTube account.

== Charts ==
Chart (2015)	Peak position
US Billboard Hot 100	90
US Hot R&B/Hip-Hop Songs (Billboard)	29
US R&B/Hip-Hop Airplay (Billboard)	23

== Certifications ==
Region	Certification	Certified units/sales
United States (RIAA)	2× Platinum	2,000,000^{‡}
^{‡} Sales+streaming figures based on certification alone.
