= Dead Game Records =

American record label

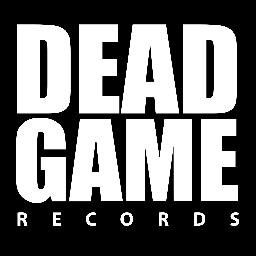
- Founded: 2002
- Founder: Travis Johnson, Tommy Jones
- Genre: Hip hop, R&B, gangsta, dance
- Country of origin: U.S.
- Location: Baton Rouge, Louisiana
- Official website: deadgamerecords.net

Dead Game Records is an American independent record label founded in Baton Rouge, Louisiana, by Tommy Jones and Travis Johnson. The label started in 2002 when Jones noticed an opening and lapse in marketing by other local and regional labels. The label has included Kevin Gates and Max Minelli.

== History ==
Johnson was a classmate of Kevin Gates at Kenilworth Middle School in Baton Rouge. Johnson encouraged him to take rapping and his skills more seriously. In 2005 Gates signed to Dead Game Records as the labels main artist for over half a decade. With financial support and strategic marketing Gates flourished. Releasing six mixtapes, including features with Boosie Bad Azz, who was from the same neighborhood as Johnson and Jones.

In the absence of Gates for two years, Dead Game joined former Koch Entertainment artist Max Minelli to release The Heart of a King and The Leak. In 2011, after his release from incarceration, Gates resumed his career with a new inspired style and an intense effort to release a multitude of projects in a short period of time. This was noticed by Artist Publishing Group which entered a joint venture partnership with Dead Game allowing Gates to be distributed by Atlantic Records.

== Roster ==
- Kevin Gates
- Baby Joe
- The Voice
- BeezyKKK
- Adam Dollars

== Former ==
- Racked up Ready (Deceased)
- Kevin Gates
- Max Minelli

== Mixtapes ==
List of mixtapes, with year released
Title	Album details
Kevin Gates - Its My Time	Released: 2006; Label: Self-released; Format: CD, digital download
Kevin Gates - Pick of the Litter	Released: 2007; Label: Self-released; Format: CD, digital download
Kevin Gates - All or Nuthing	Released: 2008; Label: Self-released; Format: CD, digital download; Plays 98,129 Downloads 54,054
Kevin Gates - All In	Released: 2009; Label: Self-released; Format: CD, digital download; Plays 158,827 Downloads 89,329
Kevin Gates - Behind Enemy Lines	Released: 2010; Label: Self-released; Format: CD, digital download; Streams 44,827
Kevin Gates and Max Minelli - The Leak	Released: 2010; Label: Self-released; Format: CD, digital download
Kevin Gates - I Don't Know What 2 Call it Vol1	Released: 2011; Label: Self-released; Format: CD, digital download; Plays 242,358 Downloads 115,929
Kevin Gates - Make Em Believe	Released: 2012; Label: Self-released; Format: CD, digital download; Plays 748,991 Downloads 478,341
Lil One The Champ - Loyalty	Released: 2015; Label: Self-released; Format: CD, digital download
Lil One The Champ - Quida Mae	Released: 2015; Label: Self-released; Format: CD, digital download

== Albums ==
List of Albums, with year released
Title	Album details
Max Minelli - Heart of a King	Released: 2011; Label: Self-released; Format: CD, digital download
Kevin Gates - Islah	Released: 2016; Label: Atlantic Records; Format: CD, digital download; Sales 2,000,000 Streams 30 Billion

== See also ==
- List of record labels
