= Fuck the Police (J Dilla song) =

Single by Jay Dee

from the album The Diary
- B-side: "Move"
- Released: August 2001; April 18, 2015 (reissue)
- Recorded: 2001
- Genre: Hip hop
- Length: 2:34
- Label: Up Above
- Songwriter: James Yancey
- Producer: Jay Dee

Jay Dee singles chronology
"Pause" (2001)	"Fuck the Police" (2001)	"The Red" (2003)

"Fuck the Police" is a song by rapper and record producer Jay Dee, who would later be known as J Dilla. The song was released as a single on September 18, 2001, under Up Above Records. In the song, Jay Dee chastises corrupt policemen who conduct illegal searches and plant evidence on blacks. "Fuck the Police" subsequently became one of J Dilla's most well-known songs as a solo emcee.

The track is built upon a sample of René Costy & His Orchestra's 1972 track "Scrabble", from which the drum break and violin sample are taken from. The 12" front cover includes pictures of Mumia Abu-Jamal, Amadou Diallo and Rodney King.

== Background ==
As a teenager in the late 1980s, James Dewitt "J Dilla" Yancey worked as a junior police cadet for the Detroit Police Department. Several years later however, after suffering through one too many incidents of police harassment and racial profiling as a young adult, his opinion of the police would change as he would record "Fuck the Police" in 2001.

In 2003, Dilla revealed his motivations behind writing the song: "That's a song I been wanting to do for a long-ass time. I need to do a Part 2 actually. It's getting so crazy in Detroit now with the police, man. I just felt like I wanted to speak on it. People knew it from N.W.A, but I just wanted to touch it on a more underground level so the people that I fuck with can relate too and people know that it's still going on," said the late producer. "It's real, yeah! It's like you can go through life and act like it's not, but I deal with it everyday, for real, just riding in a nice car they'll fuck with you. [You are harassed for] just being a Black person in Detroit, it's so stupid."

In an interview years later, his mother, Maureen "Ma Dukes" Yancey, gave further detail on Dilla's reason and motivation for the song: "That song was totally true. He caught so much flack from the police for being a clean young man. The police department was down the street from where we lived, and every time he pulled off they'd stop him and harass him. They even tossed the car once looking for something; because he was young and clean-cut, they thought he was selling drugs. [D12 rapper] Proof was at the house one evening when James had another run-in with them. He had only gone to the gas station which was three doors away. I told him not to get upset because he was hurt to tears. He was so angry and just tired of being harassed, so I told him, 'Look, this is what you do: you go downstairs and make a song about it, and you laugh in their face.' And that's when he came up with the 'F the Police' thing. And people are still singing it today! Every time I go somewhere, that's one of the songs they play."

"Fuck the Police" was originally recorded for his major label debut, The Diary, which was intended to be released on MCA Records around 2001. However, the song was turned down by MCA Records, as the label seemingly did not want to receive any ominous, unsolicited letters from the FBI. J Dilla still wanted the message of his experience, in urban Detroit, to permeate the conversation. Thus, he altered the song's introduction, and brought the song to California-based indie imprint Up Above Records, who would release it in 2001 on a 12-inch vinyl.

The record begins with a public service announcement denouncing violence against police officers: "The views expressed on this recording are solely those of the artist and by no means do we encourage or condone violence against law officials," before adding "We can lose a few of 'em, we got enough of 'em."

=== Artwork ===
Up Above Records' Key-Kool, who designed the single's artwork, disclosed that J Dilla did not want to be pictured on it. Dilla then advised Kool to "Grab images that you think represent the record." The front cover design includes images of the Rodney King beating, martyr Amadou Diallo and political prisoner Mumia Abu-Jamal. The back cover features the disclaimer Dilla stated at the track's introduction. Yet, it is set against the backdrop of a pig's head on an African spear.

=== Reissue ===
J Dilla's imprint, Pay Jay Productions, reissued a remastered version of "Fuck the Police". The song, using original mixes, was exclusively released as a police badge-shaped 9-inch picture disc single for Record Store Day 2015 (April 18). Both the vocal and instrumental are sourced directly from mix-downs that Dilla himself created. This limited edition disc single was designed by Stones Throw Records' Jeff Jank.

== Track listing ==
12" maxi single
No.	Title	Length
1.	"Fuck the Police (Dirty)"	2:37
2.	"Fuck the Police (Radio)"	2:37
3.	"Fuck the Police (Instrumental)"	2:33
4.	"Move (Dirty)" (featuring Frank n Dank)	3:40
5.	"Move (Radio)" (featuring Frank n Dank)
6.	"Move (Instrumental)"
Total length:		18:43

9" vinyl single
No.	Title	Length
1.	"Fuck the Police (Vocal)"	2:34
2.	"Fuck the Police (Instrumental)"	1:09
