= Lil B.I.G. Pac =

Mixtape by Kodak Black
- Released: June 11, 2016
- Recorded: 2016
- Genre: Hip-hop; trap
- Length: 41:38
- Label: Dollaz N Dealz; Sniper Gang
- Producer: C-Clip Beatz; Derelle Rideout; Dubba-AA; EyezLowBeats; Honorable C.N.O.T.E.; Jahfi AMT; J Gramm; SAWD; SkipOnDaBeat; YodaYae1k

Kodak Black chronology
Institution (2015)	Lil B.I.G. Pac (2016)	Painting Pictures (2017)

Singles from Lil B.I.G. Pac
- 1. "Vibin in This Bih" Released: June 10, 2016

Lil B.I.G. Pac is the fourth mixtape by American rapper Kodak Black. It was released on June 11, 2016, by Dollaz N Dealz Entertainment and Sniper Gang. The mixtape features guest appearances from rappers Gucci Mane, Boosie Badazz and PnB Rock.

== Artwork ==
The cover art for Lil B.I.G. Pac features Kodak Black portrayed as a toddler, adapted from album cover of rapper The Notorious B.I.G.'s debut studio album Ready to Die, with a baby bottle said to contain purple drank and a bandana tied around his head like American rapper Tupac.

== Critical reception ==
Professional ratings
Aggregate scores
Source	Rating
Metacritic	64/100
Review scores
Source	Rating
The New York Times	90/100
Pitchfork	7.2/10
XXL	7.2/10
Exclaim!	6/10
The Wire	60/100
RapReviews	40/100

Lil B.I.G. Pac received positive reviews from critics. At Metacritic, which assigns a normalized rating out of 100 to reviews from mainstream publications, the album received an average score of 64, based on 6 reviews.

== Track listing ==
No.	Title	Producer(s)	Length
1.	"Everything 1K"	Dubba-AA	3:06
2.	"Vibin in This Bih" (featuring Gucci Mane)	Dubba-AA	2:49
3.	"Can I"	Honorable C.N.O.T.E.; Derelle Rideout	3:35
4.	"Slayed" (featuring Boosie Badazz)	Dubba-AA	3:26
5.	"Big Bank"	EyezLowBeats	3:14
6.	"Gave It All I Got"	C-Clip Beatz	3:33
7.	"Too Many Years" (featuring PnB Rock)	J Gramm	3:16
8.	"Today"	YodaYae1k	3:13
9.	"Purp"	Jahfi AMT	4:00
10.	"Young Prodigy"	SkipOnDaBeat	3:09
11.	"30"	YodaYae1k	3:25
12.	"Letter"	SAW.D	2:24
13.	"Blood Sweat Tears Revenge"	SAW.D	2:28
Total length:			41:38

== Charts ==
Chart (2016)	Peak position
US Billboard 200	134
US Top R&B/Hip-Hop Albums (Billboard)	49
