= FDA Music =

American rapper

FDAmusic
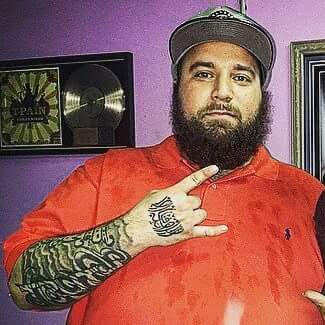

Background information
- Born: Fadi Abouabsi; December 16, 1986 (age 39); Al Khobar, Saudi Arabia
- Genres: Hip Hop
- Occupation: Rapper
- Years active: 2004–present
- Label: Overgrind Records
- Website: http://fdamusic.com

Fadi Abouabsi (born December 16, 1986) professionally known by his stage name FDAMusic, is a Saudi-born American rapper. At the age of 18, he started his first musical venture, Overgrind Records, with business partner B-Luce in 2004. He released his second solo album, Fame, in 2015, which received critical acclaim from underground hip-hop magazines Streetkode, 24hour Hip Hop, and Coast 2 Coast Mixtapes. FDAMusic has worked with other notable underground rappers such as Kirko Bangz and Kevin Gates. He has also worked on projects with producers Savages, Kalani on Da Beat, and The Mechanics.

== Life and career ==
=== Scarface Icon Music Tours ===
In 2016 FDAmusic participated in opening for Houston rapper scarface on the Icon tour.

=== American Lebanese Culture Center ===
FDAMusic is active in the Arab and Lebanese communities in Houston, Texas. In 2015 he helped sponsor the American Lebanese Culture Center’s Lebanese Festival, held April 18–19, 2015. The event helped promote Lebanese culture while celebrating the local community’s contributions to Houston, Texas.

=== Racial profiling and policing ===
In December 2014, FDAMusic was featured on Lisa Evers’ HOT97 podcast, Street Soldiers. FDAMusic discussed his experiences with racial profiling and issues of racism in American policing strategies.

== Discography ==
=== Studio albums ===
- Fame (2015)
- Made It (2014)

=== Mixtapes/compilations ===
- Overgrind Empire (2015)
- Fame – Mixtapes (2015)
- FDAMusic V.I.P. with DJ Khasper Bhinks and Coast 2 Coast DJs Singles (2014)

=== Singles ===
- "Trap House” – Made It (2014)
- ""I Know It" ft. Kevin Gates - Fame" (2015)
- ""All into her" ft. Kirko Bangz - Fame" (2015)

== Tours ==
=== 2016 Scarface Iconic Tour ===
| Date | City | Venue |
|---|---|---|
(Opening act for Scarface (rapper) during the 2016 Scarface Iconic Tour)
| February 11, 2016 | Tulsa | Shrine |
| February 12, 2016 | Dallas | Trees Dallas |
| February 13, 2016 | Oklahoma City | OKC Farmers Market |
| February 15, 2016 | El Paso | Club 301 |
| February 16, 2016 | Tucson | Club 4th Ave |
| February 17, 2016 | San Diego | La Luz Ultra Lounge |
| February 18, 2016 | Los Angeles | Los Globos |
| February 19, 2016 | San Francisco | Mezzanine |
| February 21, 2016 | Sacramento | Harlows |
| February 23, 2016 | Seattle | Nectar Lounge |
| February 24, 2016 | Portland | Hawthorne Theatre |
| February 26, 2016 | Salt Lake City | Liquid Joe's |
| February 27, 2016 | Colorado Springs | Sick Puppy Saloon |
| February 28, 2016 | Denver | Roxy Theatre |
