= Luca Brasi 3 =

Mixtape by Kevin Gates
- Released: September 28, 2018
- Recorded: 2018
- Genre: Hip hop; trap
- Length: 58:13
- Label: Bread Winners Association; Atlantic
- Producer: A.R.; Beatmonster Marc; DJ Chose; E-Trou; Fresh Ayr; Go Grizzly; Invincible Beats; Kilo Keys; Knucklehead; LondnBlue; Mad Max; Patrick Carmelo; Rippa on the Beat; Rock Boy Beats; Rockin wit Slime; Squat Beats; Taz Taylor; TM88; Will Major; Wheezy; XL Eagle; Yung Ladd; Yung Lan

Kevin Gates chronology
Chained to the City (2018)	Luca Brasi 3 (2018)	Only the Generals Gon Understand (2019)

Singles from Luca Brasi 3
- 1. "Money Long" Released: September 3, 2018; 2. "Great Man" Released: September 3, 2018; 3. "Me Too" Released: September 20, 2018; 4. "Adding Up" Released: September 24, 2018

Luca Brasi 3 is the sixteenth mixtape by American hip hop recording artist Kevin Gates. It was released on September 28, 2018, via Bread Winners Association and Atlantic Records.

== Background ==
Luca Brasi 3 is the third installment of the Luca Brasi series by American rapper Kevin Gates. The mixtape serves as his second release of 2018, following Chained to the City, just four months prior, as well as his first full-length release since being released from prison. To promote the project, Gates was interviewed by Beats 1's Zane Lowe, stating that "This is my first time truly being free, I always had something over my head, I was always fighting the court case, I always had a warrant or something pending. This is my first time truly enjoying life." He also stated that on Luca Brasi 3 that he mentions topics that he couldn't talk about on the first two installments.

== Singles ==
The first two singles "Great Man" and "Money Long" were released on September 3, 2018. The music video of "Money Long" was released on September 13, 2018. The music video of "Great Man" was released on October 31, 2018.

The third single "Me Too" was released on September 20, 2018. The fourth single is "Adding Up" was released September 24, 2018. The music video was released on September 28, 2018.

== Other songs ==
The music video for "M.A.T.A" was released December 3, 2018.

The music video for "Discussion" was released December 19, 2018.

== Commercial performance ==
Luca Brasi 3 debuted at number four on the US Billboard 200, earning 78,000 album-equivalent units, which included 18,000 copies sold in its first week. This became Gates' third top-ten project on the chart. The project also debuted at number three on the US Top R&B/Hip-Hop Albums chart. On July 9, 2019, the mixtape was certified gold by the Recording Industry Association of America (RIAA) for combined sales and album-equivalent units of over 500,000 units in the United States.

== Track listing ==
Writing credits adapted from Tidal

No.	Title	Writer(s)	Producer(s)	Length
1.	"Discussion"	Kevin Gilyard; Milan Modi	Yung Lan	2:42
2.	"Shakin' Back"	Gilyard; Toussaint Ricardo	Rippa on the Beat	2:49
3.	"Ridiculous"	Gilyard; Modi	Yung Lan; Kilo Keyz	3:03
4.	"Money Long"	Gilyard; Norman Payne	DJ Chose	2:49
5.	"I Got U"	Gilyard; Danny Snodgrass, Jr.	Taz Taylor; E-Trou	3:09
6.	"Great Man"	Gilyard; Modi; Trevon Campbell	Yung Lan; XL Eagle	2:56
7.	"Find U Again"	Gilyard; Matthew Mallia	A.R.; Patrick Carmelo	4:12
8.	"Adding Up"	Gilyard; Vincent Watson; Derrick Gray	Invincible Beats	3:26
9.	"In God I Trust"	Gilyard; Rick Witherspoon, Jr.; Brittany Hazzard	Mad Max	3:33
10.	"Me Too"	Gilyard; Gray	Yung Ladd; Rock Boy Beats	3:22
11.	"Servin' H"	Gilyard; Modi	Yung Lan	3:44
12.	"Wrong Love"	Gilyard; Wesley Glass; Bryan Simmons	Wheezy; TM88	2:55
13.	"Luca Brasi Freestyle"	Gilyard; William Gaskins	Will Major; LondnBlue	4:04
14.	"Shoulda"	Gilyard; Kevin Price; Julius Rivera III	Go Grizzly; Squat Beats	2:43
15.	"Kung Fu"	Gilyard; Modi	Yung Lan	3:04
16.	"Don't Know"	Gilyard; Samuel Irving III; Glenda Proby	Knucklehead; Rockin wit Slime	2:40
17.	"Tryna Yea"	Gilyard; Modi; Vincent Miller	Yung Lan; Beatmonster Marc	3:22
18.	"M.A.T.A"	Gilyard; Jeffery Robinson; Gray	Fresh Ayr	3:39
Total length:				58:13

== Charts ==
=== Weekly charts ===
Chart (2018)	Peak position
Canadian Albums (Billboard)	32
US Billboard 200	4
US Top R&B/Hip-Hop Albums (Billboard)	3

=== Year-end charts ===
Chart (2018)	Position
US Billboard 200	182
US Top R&B/Hip-Hop Albums (Billboard)	64

Chart (2019)	Position
US Billboard 200	166
US Top R&B/Hip-Hop Albums (Billboard)	93

== Certifications ==
Region	Certification	Certified units/sales
United States (RIAA)	Platinum	1,000,000^{‡}
^{‡} Sales+streaming figures based on certification alone.
