= I'm Him 2 =

Studio album by Kevin Gates
- Released: March 19, 2025
- Recorded: 2024–2025
- Genres: Hip-hop; Southern hip-hop
- Length: 33:14
- Labels: Bread Winners Alumni; Artist Partner Group
- Producers: CuBeatz; 48th St; Arjun; Black Ice; CarsonMadeIt; DJ Chose; Dusk; FlexOnDaTrack; KeemTurbo; LukasBL; MacroMadeIt; Mills; Rijhay Sampson; TBoy; VVS Beats; WyaSina; Young Montana; Yung Lan

Kevin Gates chronology
| The Ceremony (2024) | I'm Him 2 (2025) |

Singles from I'm Him 2
- 1. "Be Somebody" Released: November 26, 2024; 2. "Right Where I'm Supposed To Be" Released: March 19, 2025

I'm Him 2 is the fifth studio album by American rapper Kevin Gates, released on March 19, 2025, through Bread Winners Alumni under an exclusive license with Artist Partner Group. The album features eleven tracks with a notable collaboration with Lingo on the song "Therapy Sessions." Primarily produced by 48th St, Arjun, Black Ice, FlexOnDaTrack and VVS beats among others, I'm Him 2 is characterized by its southern hip-hop and trap style, with introspective and raw lyricism. The album received mixed reviews, with fans and critics praising Gates' authenticity and vulnerability, though some noted an uneven track selection and a lack of innovation compared to his previous work. The album serves as a sequel to his second studio album I'm Him (2019).

== Background ==
I'm Him 2 serves as the sequel to Kevin Gates' 2019 album, I'm Him, and follows his 2024 release, The Ceremony. The album was announced via social media where Gates described the album as an exploration of his victories, painful losses, and personal journey, with tracks like Therapy Sessions showcasing a vulnerable side where he addresses the challenges of sharing his inner struggles. Critics noted Gates' ability to stay true to his signature style, blending raw storytelling with motivational anthems like Be Somebody, where he encourages listeners to believe in their potential. However, some reviews criticized the abrupt tonal shifts between tracks and a sense that the album felt rushed. Tracks like "Brasi the Eagle" and "Big Bruddah (Don't Be Mad)" were praised for their storytelling and triumphant energy.

== Singles ==
On September 26, 2024, Kevin Gates released the lead single of the album entitled Be Somebody. The song thematic is about becoming the best version of yourself, regardless of the circumstances.

On March 19, 2025, he released the second single of the album entitled Right Where I'm Supposed to Be.

== Track listing ==
I'm Him 2 track listing
| No. | Title | Writer(s) | Producer(s) | Length |
|---|---|---|---|---|
| 1. | "Therapy Sessions" (featuring Lingo) | Kevin Jerome Gilyard | CuBeatz; LukasBL | 3:38 |
| 2. | "Big Bruddah (Don't Be Mad)" | Gilyard | TBoy; WyaSina | 3:39 |
| 3. | "Manifest" | Gilyard | Dusk; VVS Beats | 2:53 |
| 4. | "Right Where I'm Supposed To Be" | Gilyard | Millz; Rijhay Sampson | 2:12 |
| 5. | "No Pressure" | Gilyard | Young Montana; VVS Beats | 2:46 |
| 6. | "Same Way" | Gilyard | Black Ice; KeemTurbo; CarsonMadeIt | 3:41 |
| 7. | "Brasi The Eagle" | Gilyard; Robert Kelly Thomas | Arjun; VVS Beats; MacroMadeIt | 3:08 |
| 8. | "See Me" | Gilyard | 48th St | 2:30 |
| 9. | "Block Away" | Gilyard | DJ Chose | 3:09 |
| 10. | "Be Somebody" | Gilyard | FlexOnDaTrack; VVS Beats | 2:58 |
| 11. | "Kiss The Ring" | Gilyard | Yung Lan | 2:40 |
| Total length: | | | | 33:14 |

== Charts ==
Chart performance for I'm Him 2
| Chart (2025) | Peak position |
|---|---|
| US Billboard 200 | 63 |
| US Top R&B/Hip-Hop Albums (Billboard) | 20 |
