= Chained to the City =

EP by Kevin Gates
- Released: May 14, 2018
- Recorded: 2018
- Genres: Trap; hip hop
- Length: 9:50
- Labels: Atlantic; Bread Winners Association
- Producers: Bobby Lamar Barrett; Pooh Beatz; Go Grizzly; Squat Beats; Pliznaya

Kevin Gates chronology
By Any Means 2 (2017)	Chained to the City (2018)	Luca Brasi 3 (2018)

Chained to the City is the debut EP by American rapper Kevin Gates. It was released on May 14, 2018 via Bread Winners Association and Atlantic Records.

== Release ==
The project was released without any prior announcement. It is Gates' first project release since being released from prison in January 2018.

The first music video of the project is "Change Lanes", it was released on May 16, 2018 and directed by Cole Bennett. The music video of "Let It Sing" was released June 5, 2018. The music video of "Vouch" was released on August 6, 2018.

== Track listing ==
No.	Title	Writer(s)	Producer(s)	Length
1.	"Change Lanes"	Kevin Gilyard; Pooh Beatz; Go Grizzly; Bobby Lamar Barrett	Bobby Lamar Barrett; Pooh Beatz; Go Grizzly	3:25
2.	"Vouch"	Gilyard; Squat Beats; Go Grizzly	Go Grizzly; Squat Beats	3:10
3.	"Let It Sing"	Gilyard; Pliznaya	Pliznaya	3:15
Total length:				9:50
