= Time for That =

Single by Kevin Gates

from the album Islah
- Released: September 9, 2016
- Recorded: 2015
- Genre: Hip hop
- Length: 3:28
- Label: BWA; Atlantic
- Songwriter(s): Kevin Gilyard; Norman "DJ Chose" Payne; Steve "Swiff D" Thornton
- Producer(s): Swiff D; Nick Seeley (add.)

Kevin Gates singles chronology
"2 Phones" (2015)	"Time for That" (2016)	"What If" (2017)

"Time for That" is a song by American rapper Kevin Gates. It was released on September 9, 2016, as the fourth and final single from his debut studio album Islah. It peaked at number 19 on the Bubbling Under Hot 100 Singles on the week ending October 1, 2016.

== Music video ==
The song's accompanying music video premiered on September 9, 2016 on Kevin Gates's YouTube account. Robin Hilton said, "The new video from Baton Rouge rapper Kevin Gates is a sultry slow-burner beautifully shot against an arid landscape, with Gates standing amid the ruins of a dusty, burned-out building."

== Charts ==
Chart (2016)	Peak position
US Bubbling Under Hot 100 Singles (Billboard)	19
US Hot R&B/Hip-Hop Songs (Billboard)	48

== Certifications ==
Region	Certification	Certified units/sales
United States (RIAA)	2× Platinum	2,000,000^{‡}
^{‡} Sales+streaming figures based on certification alone.
