= Really Really (song) =

Single by Kevin Gates

from the album Islah
- Released: October 9, 2015
- Recorded: 2015
- Genre: Hip hop
- Length: 3:52
- Label: BWA; Atlantic
- Songwriters: Kevin Gilyard; Jake Troth; Alex Goose; William Lobban-Bean
- Producers: Alex Goose; CookClassics; Jake Troth

Kevin Gates singles chronology
"Kno One" (2015)	"Really Really" (2015)	"2 Phones" (2015)

"Really Really" is a song by American rapper Kevin Gates. It was released on October 9, 2015, as the second single from his debut studio album Islah.

== Music video ==
The song's accompanying music video premiered on December 11, 2015 on Kevin Gates's YouTube account. Since its release, the video has received over 240 million views on YouTube.

== Commercial performance ==
"Really Really" debuted at number 48 on the Billboard Hot R&B/Hip-Hop Songs chart the week of December 19, 2015. It peaked at number 14 the week of April 16, 2016, and spent 26 weeks on the chart. On the Billboard Hot 100, the song debuted at number 94 the week of January 9, 2016. It reached number 46 the week of July 9, and remained on the chart for 26 weeks. Two weeks later, the song peaked at number 21 on the Rhythmic chart, staying there for eleven weeks. On October 6, 2022, the single was certified sextuple platinum for combined sales and streaming data of over six million units in the United States.

In Canada, the track debuted at number 99 on the Canadian Hot 100 the week of April 9. Seven weeks later, it peaked at number 91 the week of July 2, and stayed on the chart for ten weeks.

== Charts ==
=== Weekly charts ===
Chart (2015–2016)	Peak position
Canada Hot 100 (Billboard)	91
US Billboard Hot 100	46
US Hot R&B/Hip-Hop Songs (Billboard)	14
US Rhythmic Airplay (Billboard)	21

=== Year-end charts ===
Chart (2016)	Position
US Billboard Hot 100	92
US Hot R&B/Hip-Hop Songs (Billboard)	38

== Certifications ==
Region	Certification	Certified units/sales
United States (RIAA)	6× Platinum	6,000,000^{‡}
^{‡} Sales+streaming figures based on certification alone.
