= Murder for Hire 2 =

Mixtape by Kevin Gates
- Released: May 27, 2016
- Recorded: 2016
- Genre: Hip hop
- Length: 29:02
- Labels: Bread Winners' Association; Atlantic
- Producers: I.TrezBeats; The Villians; Yung Lan; BWA Ron; Millz; Jon-C; Go Grizzly; Abe; Rad Cat; Beat Dilla

Kevin Gates chronology
Islah (2016)	Murder for Hire 2 (2016)	By Any Means 2 (2017)

Murder for Hire 2 is the fourteenth mixtape by American rapper Kevin Gates. It was released on May 27, 2016, by his own independent record label Bread Winners' Association and Atlantic Records. Unlike his other mixtapes, which were released both for free and retail, this mixtape was strictly for retail purposes only.

== Release ==
Kevin Gates wants to release another studio album but Atlantic Records said that they didn't allow him to release another studio album until February 2017 so he announced the sequel to Murder For Hire. The mixtape is available to stream on Spotify and Apple Music but not currently available on DatPiff.

== Songs ==
The mixtape contains 8 songs. The opening track, Fuck It contain sample of Cut It from American rapper O.T. Genasis. OG Boobie Black is the only feature of the mixtape.

== Commercial performance ==
Murder For Hire 2 debuted at number 12 on the US Billboard 200, with 27,000 album-equivalent units; it sold 20,000 copies in its first week, and boasted over 7.3 million streams.

== Track listing ==
No.	Title	Producer(s)	Length
1.	"Fuck It"	ITrezBeats	4:01
2.	"The Prayer"	The Villians	3:52
3.	"Believe In Me"	Yung Lan	3:22
4.	"Click House" (featuring OG Boobie Black)	BWA Ron; Millz	2:51
5.	"Great Example"	Go Grizzly; Winners Circle; Jon-C	3:25
6.	"Lil Nigga"	Abe	3:25
7.	"Showin' Up"	Rad Cat	4:16
8.	"Off da Meter"	Beat Dilla	3:48
Total length:			29:02

=== Sample credits ===
- "Fuck It" contains samples of "Cut It, performed by O.T. Genasis.

== Charts ==
=== Weekly charts ===
Chart (2016)	Peak position
US Billboard 200	12
US Top R&B/Hip-Hop Albums (Billboard)	3

=== Year-end charts ===
Chart (2016)	Position
US Top R&B/Hip-Hop Albums (Billboard)	81
