= 2 Phones =

Single by Kevin Gates

from the album Islah
- Released: November 5, 2015
- Recorded: 2015
- Genre: Hip hop; trap
- Length: 4:00
- Label: BWA; Atlantic
- Songwriters: Kevin Gilyard; Brittany Hazzard
- Producer: Mad Max

Kevin Gates singles chronology
| "Really Really" (2015) | "2 Phones" (2015) | "Time for That" (2016) |

Music video
- "2 Phones" on YouTube

"2 Phones" is a song by American rapper Kevin Gates. It was released on November 5, 2015 as the third single from his debut studio album Islah. It peaked at number 17 on the Billboard Hot 100, making it Gates' first top 20 song and his highest-charting single to date.

== Music video ==
The song's accompanying music video premiered on January 1, 2016 on Kevin Gates's YouTube account. It was directed by Jon J, who previously directed the music videos for Gates' "Kno One" and "Really Really".

== Chart performance ==
"2 Phones" debuted at number 93 on the US Billboard Hot 100 for the chart dated January 23, 2016. It eventually reached its peak position at number 17 for the chart dated April 23, 2016. On October 6, 2022, the single was certified quintuple platinum for combined sales and streaming data of over four million units in the United States.

== Charts ==
=== Weekly charts ===
| Chart (2015–2016) | Peak position |
|---|---|
| Canada Hot 100 (Billboard) | 52 |
| US Billboard Hot 100 | 17 |
| US Hot R&B/Hip-Hop Songs (Billboard) | 3 |
| US Rhythmic Airplay (Billboard) | 5 |

=== Year-end charts ===
| Chart (2016) | Position |
|---|---|
| US Billboard Hot 100 | 57 |
| US Hot R&B/Hip-Hop Songs (Billboard) | 18 |
| US Rhythmic (Billboard) | 34 |

== Certifications ==
| Region | Certification | Certified units/sales |
|---|---|---|
| New Zealand (RMNZ) | Platinum | 30,000^{‡} |
| United States (RIAA) | 5× Platinum | 5,000,000^{‡} |
^{‡} Sales+streaming figures based on certification alone.
