= By Any Means 2 (mixtape) =

Mixtape by Kevin Gates
- Released: September 22, 2017
- Recorded: 2016–2017
- Genre: Hip hop
- Length: 46:24
- Labels: Bread Winners' Association; Atlantic
- Producers: Dreka Haynes (exec.); Ben Billions; Chris Batson; Diego Ave; DJ Marley Waters; EY; Geoffro Cause; Infamous; JMIKE; Kane Beatz; Lavish; Luca; Mad Max; Millz; Play Picasso; Prezident Jeff; Rvssian; $K; Smash David; T-Collar; Velous; Xeryus G

Kevin Gates chronology
| Murder for Hire 2 (2016) | By Any Means 2 (2017) | Chained to the City (2018) |

Singles from By Any Means 2
- 1. "What If" Released: April 4, 2017; 2. "No Love" Released: July 20, 2017

By Any Means 2 is the fifteenth mixtape by American rapper Kevin Gates. It was released on September 22, 2017, through his independent label, Bread Winners' Association, with Atlantic Records.

The mixtape was released while Gates was incarcerated. Unlike his previous mixtapes, which were available both for free and retail, By Any Means 2 was released exclusively for retail.

== Singles ==
The first single, "What If", was released on April 4, 2017.Its music video premiered on September 6, 2019.

The second single, "No Love", was released on July 20, 2017.

=== Promotional singles ===
The first promotional track, "Had To", was released on September 7, 2017.Its music video, released on October 12, 2017, and features Gates' wife and a Kevin Gates lookalike.

The second track, "Beautiful Scars", is the only song on the mixtape with featured vocals, coming from PnB Rock. It was released on September 14, 2017.

The third track, "Imagine That", was released alongside the mixtape on September 22, 2017. Its music video followed on September 25, 2017. and features only Gates' wife and two children.

== Commercial performance ==
By Any Means 2 debuted at number 100 on the US Billboard 200. In its second week, it rose to its peak position of number 4.

== Track listing ==
Credits adapted from ASCAP.

| No. | Title | Writer(s) | Producer(s) | Length |
|---|---|---|---|---|
| 1. | "No Love" | Kevin Gilyard; Jamil Alleyne | Millz | 3:20 |
| 2. | "McGyver" | Gilyard; Alleyne | Millz | 3:16 |
| 3. | "Had To" | Gilyard; Rick Witherspoon, Jr.; Daenerys Targaryene | Mad Max | 3:41 |
| 4. | "Fuckin Right" | Gilyard; Eyobed Getachew; Tinashe Sibanda; Chris Batson | EY; T-Collar; Batson | 3:18 |
| 5. | "Beautiful Scars" (featuring PnB Rock) | Gilyard; Rakim Allen; Tarik Johnston; Tom Brock; Kevin Paolucci; Norman Payne; Robert Relf | Rvssian | 3:08 |
| 6. | "Attention" | Gilyard; Matthew Samuels; Zale Epstein; Brett Krueger; Matthew O'Brien | Boi-1da; The Maven Boys | 3:47 |
| 7. | "G.O.M.D." | Gilyard; Daniel Johnson; Luca Polizzi | Kane Beatz; Luca | 3:09 |
| 8. | "D You Down" | Gilyard; John McGee; Geoffrey Earley; Xeryus Gittens; Tasha Catour; Jim Lavigne | $K; Geoffro Cause; Xeryus G | 3:14 |
| 9. | "What If" | Gilyard; Benjamin Diehl; Marco Rodriguez-Diaz; Mike Caren; Ethan Lowery | Ben Billions; Infamous | 3:15 |
| 10. | "Came Up" | Gilyard; Brendon Waters | DJ Marley Waters | 2:42 |
| 11. | "Imagine That" | Gilyard; Jeremy Coleman; Witherspoon, Jr.; Targaryene | JMIKE; Mad Max | 3:40 |
| 12. | "No Trust" | Gilyard; Samuel Jimenez; Diego Avendaño; Payne | Smash David; Diego Ave | 2:29 |
| 13. | "Just Wanna" | Gilyard; Jeffrey Offe | Prezident Jeff | 3:51 |
| 14. | "Why I" | Gilyard; David Doman; James Stewart | D. A. Doman | 3:33 |
| Total length: | | | | 46:24 |

== Charts ==
=== Weekly charts ===
| Chart (2017) | Peak position |
|---|---|
| US Billboard 200 | 4 |
| US Top R&B/Hip-Hop Albums (Billboard) | 3 |

=== Year-end charts ===
| Chart (2017) | Position |
|---|---|
| US Top R&B/Hip-Hop Albums (Billboard) | 87 |
