= Kevin Gates =

American rapper (born 1986)

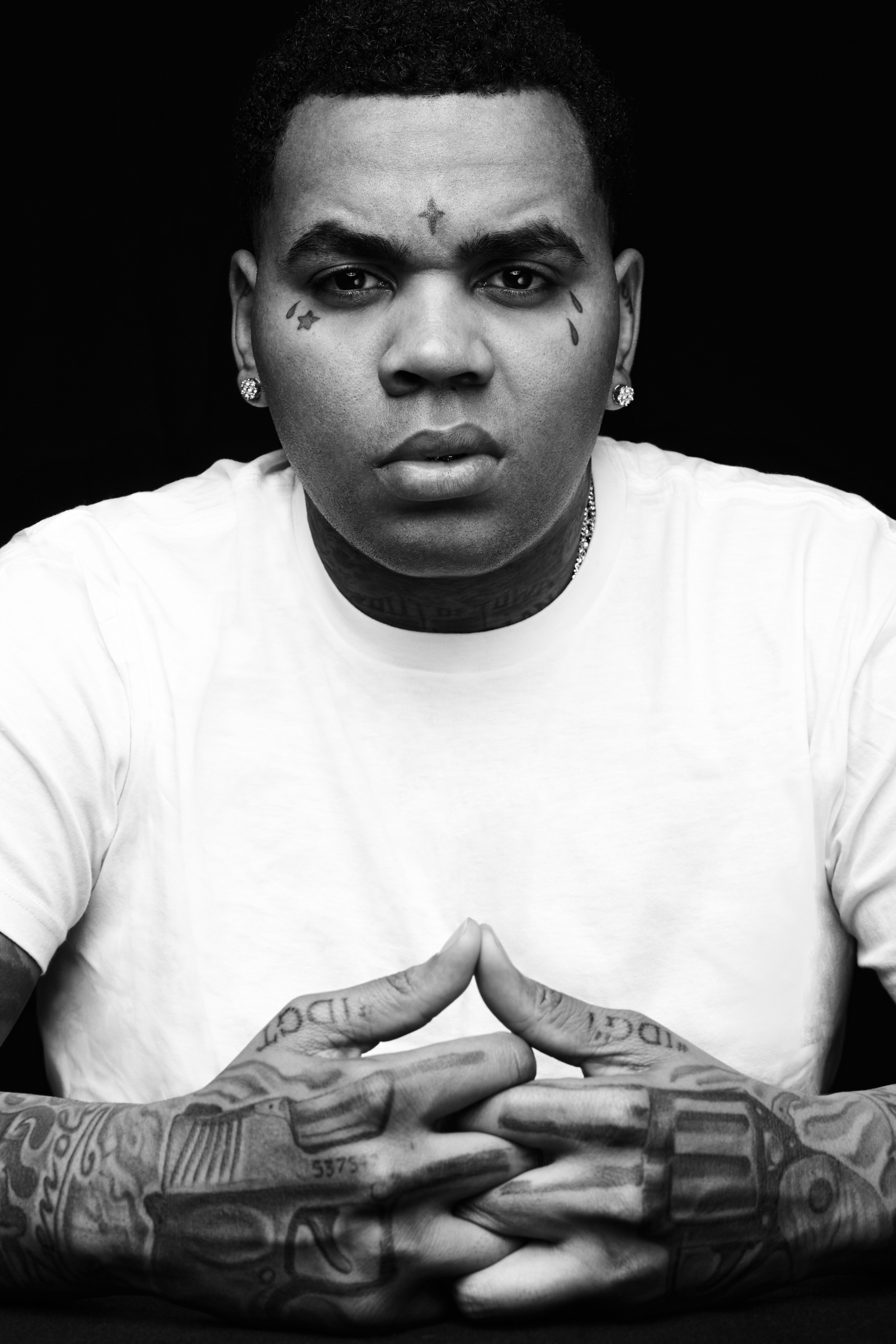
- Gates in 2014

Background information
- Born: Kevin Jerome Gilyard; February 5, 1986 (age 40)
- Origin: Baton Rouge, Louisiana, U.S.
- Genres: Hip-hop; gangsta rap
- Occupations: Rapper; singer; songwriter
- Years active: 2007–present
- Labels: Atlantic; Bread Winners'; Dead Game
- Spouse(s): Dreka Haynes (m. 2015; div. 2025) Brittany Renner (m. 2025; div. 2025)
- Children: 4

Kevin Jerome Gilyard (born February 5, 1986), known professionally as Kevin Gates, is an American rapper, singer, and songwriter. He is currently signed to Bread Winners' Association with a partnership with Atlantic Records. His debut studio album, Islah, released in January 2016 and peaked at number two on the U.S. Billboard 200 chart. Prior to Islah, Gates also released a number of mixtapes, including Stranger Than Fiction (2013), By Any Means (2014), and Luca Brasi 2 (2014), all of which peaked in the top 40 on the Billboard 200 chart.

== Early life ==
Kevin Jerome Gilyard was born on February 5, 1986, to a Puerto Rican mother and a Moroccan father; his family name is that of his mother's. He and his family relocated to New Orleans, Louisiana, before settling in Baton Rouge. Gates was arrested for the first time in 1999 at the age of 13 for joyriding in a stolen vehicle as a passenger. He lost contact with his father at a young age, but he later reconnected with him. When Gates was a teenager, his father died of complications from AIDS, which he contracted from sharing needles during drug use. Gates has spoken about having been sexually abused as a child. When he was 17, he briefly attended Baton Rouge Community College.

== Career ==
=== 2007–2012: Early career, setbacks, and Young Money ===
Gates began his career in 2007 by signing to local label Dead Game Records. His career blossomed along with fellow Baton Rouge natives Boosie Badazz and Webbie in the mid-2000s. The three collaborated on Gates' first mixtape, Pick of Da Litter, in 2007. Another mixtape, All or Nuthin', was released in 2008 and featured what Gates described as "a lot of pain...a lot of true stories." In 2008, both Gates and Boosie were incarcerated in separate cases, effectively pausing Gates' music career. He spent 31 months in prison between 2008 and 2011. During this time, Gates claimed he earned a master's degree in psychology through a prison program. He was released early from prison for good behavior.

After his stint in prison, Gates began working on music again almost immediately. In 2012, he gained attention with the mixtape Make 'Em Believe. He also caught the attention of Lil Wayne's record label, Young Money Entertainment. Gates was signed to the management wing of the label later that year. Although he was signed to the management wing, Gates never signed a record deal with Young Money. He noted, however, that it was Birdman who gave him the idea to start his own record label, named Bread Winners' Association, later on.

=== 2013–2014: Atlantic Records and mixtape breakthroughs ===
In early 2013, Gates released the mixtape, The Luca Brasi Story, via his Bread Winners' Association record label. The mixtape received critical praise with Pitchfork saying it, "imbues trap's claustrophobic bleakness with an emotional nakedness, capable lyricism, and melodic certitude many of its recent breakout stars have lacked." Rolling Stone named the mixtape's single, "Wylin' ", the 40th best song of 2013. On the heels of the success of that mixtape, Gates was signed to Atlantic Records. He released his first major label mixtape, Stranger Than Fiction, in July 2013. The mixtape deals with issues ranging from depression to Gates' time in prison. The mixtape also received favorable reviews despite generally being shorter than Gates had originally hoped. Stranger Than Fiction also marked the first time one of Gates' mixtapes charted on the Billboard 200, peaking at number 37.

In support of the mixtape, Gates embarked on a 4-week tour in October across the United States called the Stranger Than Fiction Tour. The tour also featured Starlito and Don Trip. After the tour, Gates again found himself in prison for parole violations. He was sentenced to 4 months, but only served 3 and a half of those. Upon his release in early March 2014, he again focused on music and, in particular, his new mixtape project, By Any Means. The mixtape was released on March 18, 2014. The mixtape featured guest appearances from artists including 2 Chainz, Plies, and Rico Love. The mixtape also made it to the Billboard 200, peaking at number 17.

In May 2014, Gates was named a member of XXL's Freshman Class He also announced the By Any Means Tour, which would run from July 15 to August 30, 2014 and feature Chevy Woods. In August 2014, Gates announced the creation of a new energy drink called "I Don't Get Tired" or "#IDGT." The drink is based on Gates' 2014 single of the same name that also featured August Alsina.

=== 2015–2016: Success with "I Don't Get Tired" and Islah ===
With the release of his 13th mixtape, Luca Brasi 2, Gates earned his third Billboard 200 listing in a row. The mixtape peaked at number 38. The mixtape featured the single "I Don't Get Tired" which became Gates' first song to make the U.S. Billboard Hot 100 and his first song to be certified Gold. In February and March 2015, Gates embarked on the I Don't Get Tired Tour throughout much of the South.

In May 2015, Gates released another mixtape, Murder for Hire, which was said to be the third installment in the Luca Brasi series.

Two months later, he released the song "Kno One", which would become the first single from his debut studio album, Islah.

In late August 2015, Gates was the subject of some controversy after a video surfaced of him allegedly kicking a female fan in the chest at a show in Lakeland, Florida. Gates responded to the allegations shortly thereafter in the form of a song called "The Truth," suggesting that the fan had been tugging on his shorts.

Later in October 2015, Gates announced the title and release date of his debut studio album, Islah, which means "to make better" in Arabic and is also the name of his firstborn daughter. The album was originally slated for release on December 11, 2015. The album would eventually be pushed back to January 29, 2016. It featured a total of four singles: "Kno One", "Time for That", "Really Really" and "2 Phones".

Both "Really Really" and "2 Phones" received commercial success. The album sold 112,000 copies in the first week of its release and it also peaked at number two on the Billboard 200 chart. The album had almost no guest appearances with the exception of Trey Songz, Ty Dolla Sign, and Jamie Foxx who are all featured on the bonus track, "Jam". Islah received largely positive reviews with Inverse calling it the "Best Album of 2016 So Far". Pitchfork noted that it was "by far the best single release of his career."

=== 2016–2018: Mixtape releases ===
On May 26, 2016, Gates announced that the sequel to Murder for Hire would be coming on May 27, 2016.

On September 22, 2017, Gates' spouse Dreka released By Any Means 2 while he remained in prison. She handled executive controls of the project. The mixtape reached number four on the Billboard 200.

In May 2018, Gates released the three-song EP Chained to the City. This serves as his first release since being released from prison.

=== 2019: Only the Generals Gon Understand and I'm Him ===
On May 31, 2019, Gates released his second EP, titled Only the Generals Gon Understand.

On June 28, 2019, Gates released "Push It", along with the music video. The song served as the lead single from his second album I'm Him.

=== 2021-2022: Only the Generals, Pt. II and Khaza ===
On February 19, 2021, Gates returned with his first project since 2019 – his 17th mixtape, Only the Generals, Pt. II. Surprise-released, the project is the sequel to Gates' 2019 EP Only the Generals Gon Understand. The mixtape was recorded earlier in 2021 in Puerto Rico, with Gates explaining that this was done to celebrate his family heritage on the island. It contains the previously released single, "Plug Daughter 2", which was produced by Internet Money's Taz Taylor. The mixtape was accompanied with the release of a music video for the song, "Puerto Rico Luv", which reflects his appreciation for his heritage, along with the song "Cartel Swag".

On January 28, 2022, Gates began teasing an upcoming studio album via Instagram. On May 16, 2022, Gates would release its lead single, "Bad for Me". The same day, Gates announced the album's title, Khaza, along with the release date, cover art, and pre-sale alongside his upcoming Big Lyfe Tour. The tracklist was revealed via Apple Music and Tidal on June 11, 2022. Khaza was released on June 17, 2022 to mixed reviews and sold 40,000 units within its first week, debuting at number four on The US Top R&B/Hip-Hop Albums chart and at number two on the US Top Rap Albums chart.

=== 2023-present: Mixtape re-releases, The Ceremony, I'm Him 2, and Luca Brasi 4 ===
On February 1, 2023, Gates re-released his original Luca Brasi Story mixtape as The Luca Brasi Story (A Decade of Brasi) in commemoration of its 10th anniversary. On July 15, 2023, Gates also re-released his Stranger Than Fiction mixtape with additional remixes of "Thinking with My Dick", also in commemoration of its 10th anniversary.

On October 25, 2023, Gates announced the release of his next studio album, revealing the title as The Ceremony. Gates released four of the album's singles between August 2023 and January 2024, "Rumors", "God Slippers", "Yonce Freestyle", and "Birds Calling". The Ceremony released on January 26, 2024 to mixed reviews, with Pitchfork writing "it's quicksand on The Ceremony. The writing is all about moving forward, but the sonics keep Gates frozen in time, fused to an outdated Hot 100 sound that's incongruous with his matured, quieter stylings". The album sold 22,976 units in its first week, peaking at 24 on the Billboard 200 chart.

Gates would announce his upcoming studio album, I'm Him 2, via Instagram as a sequel to his 2019 album I'm Him. Three of the album's singles were released during the anticipation, "Right Where I'm Supposed To Be", "Be Somebody" and "Big Bruddah (Don't Be Mad)". I'm Him 2 released on March 19, 2025 to mixed reception and peaked at 63 on the Billboard 200.

On August 13, 2025, Gates released the fourth entry in his Luca Brasi series of mixtapes, Luca Brasi 4.

== Artistry ==
Gates is known primarily for his "confessional anthems" that blend often autobiographical lyrics with refined Southern beats. In a review of his debut album Islah, Consequence of Sound noted that "autobiography and honesty have always been central to [Gates'] artistry." Spin has noted that Gates often combines "melodic tunefulness" and "clenched-teeth street rap." In recent releases, he has incorporated more singing, having trained with the singer, Monica. Gates' lyrics often deal with subjects like depression, poverty, and prison time. He has listed numerous artists among his influences including Nas, Biggie Smalls, Jay-Z, Tupac Shakur, Eminem, and others.

== Personal life ==
Gates married his longtime girlfriend, Dreka Haynes, in October 2015. The couple have two children, born in 2012 and 2014. Gates hinted that he had children by other women in a 2013 interview with Complex: "I got some children. I'm real real close with them. I lay in the bed with them, hold them, love on them. It really doesn't make sense to say [how many kids I have]. Not in a bad way, but it's not like the public will ever get to see my children, and if they do see them, they aren't going to know they're mine." The couple divorced in July 2025. He entered into a Nikah marriage with social media personality Brittany Renner in April 2025, while still legally married to Haynes. Renner and Gates divorced in May 2025. He began dating Jelenny Tejada the same year.

Gates is a practicing Muslim. He and Haynes went to Mecca for Hajj in September 2016.

Gates is well known for making bizarre and outlandish claims on a wide range of topics. In a 2022 appearance on DJ Akademiks' Off the Record podcast, Gates defended an earlier claim that he had jump started a stranded stranger's car battery by placing his hands on it and praying, stating "If I didn’t, may God murder my children. Please. Kill ’em today."

== Legal issues ==
=== Battery charge ===
Gates was charged with battery for kicking a female fan in the summer of 2015 while he was performing on stage at an event in Lakeland, Florida. He used Florida's stand-your-ground law in defense. On October 26, 2016, he was convicted of the charge and sentenced to 180 days in jail.

=== Possession of a firearm charge ===
Gates was sentenced to a 30-month prison term at the East Moline, IL correctional facility for gun charges stemming from a warrant which arose from an October 2013 arrest in Chicago. Gates failed to show up in court in Illinois, leading to his warrant being reissued in December 2016, while he was serving his battery sentence (see section preceding).

He was released on parole on January 10, 2018.

==== Parole (Gilyard v. Baldwin, et al.) ====
In April 2018, Gates filed a lawsuit (Kevin Gilyard v. John R. Baldwin, Ned Shwartz, and Jason Garnett) against his parole officer, the director of the Illinois Department of Corrections (DOC), and its chief of parole for denying his requests to travel outside of Cook County, Illinois, where he was serving his probation, to perform and visit family. He claimed to have missed multiple shows in the intervening months. The case, heard in the USDC for the Northern District of Illinois, was dismissed on May 2, 2018 in a minute order following a summary hearing.

Gates filed an emergency petition requesting injunctive relief in the U.S. Court of Appeals for the 7th Circuit, which heard the case beginning on May 7, 2018. On May 9, 2018, a three judge panel dismissed his emergency petition, and scheduled the case to be heard non-urgently at a later date.

On June 18, Gates was granted his requested voluntary dismissal of his own case (FRAP 42(b)) as the issue had become moot—his parole was terminated early by the Illinois DOC in motu proprio. Gates was therefore no longer under either the authority of his parole officer or that of the MSR agreement that had been at issue. After Ilia Usharovich, Gates' attorney, confirmed that the issue was moot as Gates' parole ended early, the lower court dismissed the case.

Although he missed the JMBLYA music festival in Austin, Texas, which he originally filed his petitions to attend, Gates was able to return to live performances at The Novos in Los Angeles the following June. Gates' parole had originally been projected to expire on January 10, 2019.

== Discography ==
Studio albums

- Islah (2016)
- I'm Him (2019)
- Khaza (2022)
- The Ceremony (2024)
- I'm Him 2 (2025)
