= Islah (album) =

Studio album by Kevin Gates
- Released: January 29, 2016
- Recorded: 2015
- Genre: Hip-hop
- Length: 53:25
- Labels: Bread Winners' Association; Atlantic
- Producers: Go Grizzly; Dreamlife Beats; Alex Goose; Cook Classics; Jake Troth; Mad Max; Patrick Carmelo; Millz; Swiff D; Nick Seeley; DJ Chose; Earl & E; Rico Love; Norris Buchanan; D.A. Doman; Rvssian; IKENNA FuNkEn; The Featherstones; Ray Real

Kevin Gates chronology
Murder For Hire (2015)	Islah (2016)	Murder For Hire 2 (2016)

Singles from Islah
- 1. "Kno One" Released: July 9, 2015; 2. "Really Really" Released: October 5, 2015; 3. "2 Phones" Released: November 5, 2015; 4. "Time for That" Released: September 9, 2016

Islah is the debut studio album by American rapper Kevin Gates. It was released on January 29, 2016, by Bread Winners' Association and Atlantic Records. The album itself has no guest appearances but the deluxe edition, which includes two new tracks, features guest appearances from Trey Songz, Ty Dolla $ign, and Jamie Foxx.

The album was supported by four official singles: "Kno One", "Really Really", "2 Phones" and "Time for That". The album debuted at number two on the US Billboard 200, earning 112,000 album equivalent units in its first week. The album was certified triple platinum by the Recording Industry Association of America (RIAA). The album was first revealed in an Instagram post sent by Gates in 2015.

== Background ==
In an interview with iHeartRadio, Kevin Gates said:

"I named the album after my daughter because of the anticipation. It was so high. I remember before the birth of my daughter, the anticipation was so high. I was scared, I was excited. I was going through mixed emotions at the time. When people set a high bar because I put out so much good quality music, that bar was so high. I just didn't want to. I was afraid of being a letdown. I was afraid of not being good enough. I was scared to death upon making the album, upon releasing the album. The reason I named my album Islah was because it was my first album. My first real studio album, I guess, so to say. Everything else that I put out was mix tapes. The name Islah means to critique. To make better. A spiritual awakening. When my daughter came, she gave me all of those things. "

== Singles ==
"Kno One" was released via digital download as the album's first single on July 9, 2015. The song was produced by IKENNA FuNkEn and The Featherstones. Despite not charting, it has since been certified platinum by the RIAA.

"Really Really" was released as the album's lead single (second overall) on October 5, 2015. The song was produced by Alex Goose, Cook Classics and Jake Troth. It peaked at number 46 on the US Billboard Hot 100. To date, the song has been certified six times platinum by the Recording Industry Association of America (RIAA).

"2 Phones" was released as the album's third single on November 5, 2015. The song was produced by Mad Max. It became Gates' first top 40 hit single upon the charts, and peaked at number 17 on the Billboard Hot 100. To date, the song has been certified five times platinum by the Recording Industry Association of America (RIAA).

"Time for That" was released as the album's fourth and final single on September 9, 2016. It was produced by Swiff D, alongside additional production from Nick Seeley. Although the song peaked at number 19 on the US Bubbling Under Hot 100 Singles chart, it was eventually certified double platinum by the RIAA.

=== Other songs ===
"La Familia" and "The Truth" were released as instant grats for the album's pre-order simultaneously on September 3, 2015.

== Critical reception ==
Professional ratings
Aggregate scores
Source	Rating
AnyDecentMusic?	7.4/10
Metacritic	81/100
Review scores
Source	Rating
AllMusic	4/5 stars
The Austin Chronicle	4/5 stars
Consequence of Sound	B
HipHopDX	3.5/5
Pitchfork	8.5/10
Rolling Stone	3.5/5 stars
Spin	8/10
Tiny Mix Tapes	4/5
Vice	A−

Islah received widespread acclaim from critics. At Metacritic, which assigns a normalized rating out of 100 to reviews from mainstream publications, the album received an average score of 81, based on 10 reviews. In Vice, Robert Christgau said the songs have a variety of moods, catchy melodies, and a strong level of detail from Gates: "Do I like everything he says, much less puts on Instagram? Not close. But his saga is an encouraging, fascinating, educational up. This is a guy who always brings his daughter on tour and thinks affluence is a big day at Bloomingdale's. He's emotional, tender, violent, sensual, fickle, determined, fatalistic, unpredictable, unreliable, hedonistic, and from Louisiana. In a land of 10,000 wannabes, he's an original."

== Commercial performance ==
Islah debuted at number two on the US Billboard 200, earning 112,000 album equivalent units, (including pure album sales of 93,000 copies) in its first week. In its second week, the album fell to number ten on the chart, earning an additional 40,000 units, (including pure album sales of 24,000 copies). In its third week, the album dropped to number eleven, earning 36,000 more units. As of July 2016, the album had sold 305,000 copies in pure album sales. On October 7, 2022, the album was certified triple platinum by the Recording Industry Association of America (RIAA) for combined sales and album-equivalent units of over three million units in the United States. Billboard listed Islah at number 171 in a list of the decade's top selling 200 albums.

== Track listing ==
No.	Title	Writer(s)	Producer(s)	Length
1.	"Not the Only One"	Kevin Gilyard; Kevin Price; Jan Branicki	Go Grizzly; Dreamlife Beats	4:41
2.	"Really Really"	Gilyard; Alex Goose; William Lobban-Bean; Jake Troth	Goose; Cook Classics; Troth	3:52
3.	"2 Phones"	Gilyard; Brittany Hazzard; Rick Witherspoon, Jr.	Mad Max	4:00
4.	"Pride"	Gilyard; Matthew Paisley-Mallia	Patrick Carmelo	4:05
5.	"La Familia"	Gilyard; Jamil Alleyne; Theron Thomas; Timothy Thomas	Millz	3:50
6.	"Time for That"	Gilyard; Steve Thornton; Norman Payne	Swiff D; Nick Seeley^{[a]}	3:28
7.	"Thought I Heard (Bread Winners' Anthem)"	Gilyard; Payne	DJ Chose	3:24
8.	"Hard For"	Gilyard; Earl Hood; Eric Goudy II; Rico Love	Hood; Goudy; Rico Love; Seeley^{[a]}	4:06
9.	"Ask for More"	Gilyard; Norris Buchanan; Richard Norris	Buchanan; Norris^{[c]}	3:27
10.	"One Thing"	Gilyard; David Doman; Jim Stewart	D.A. Doman	3:19
11.	"The Truth"	Gilyard; Tarik Johnston	Rvssian	3:30
12.	"Kno One"	Gilyard; Marlin "Hookman" Bonds; Ikenna Udemba; Justin Featherstone; Christopher Featherstone; William Featherstone; Matthew Featherstone	IKENNA FuNkEn; The Featherstones	3:34
13.	"Told Me"	Gilyard; Alleyne	Millz	3:04
14.	"Ain't Too Hard"	Gilyard; Hood; Goudy; Payne; Derrick Pearson	Goudy, Th3 Coalition	3:25
15.	"I Love It"	Gilyard; Donny Flores; Adrian Santalla	Drop; Phe	3:31

Deluxe edition (bonus tracks)
No.	Title	Writer(s)	Producer(s)	Length
16.	"Jam" (featuring Trey Songz, Ty Dolla Sign and Jamie Foxx)	Gilyard; Tremaine Neverson; Tyrone Griffin, Jr.; Jamie Foxx; Micah Powell; Belinda Lipscomb; Boaz Watson; Kenneth Edmonds	Powell	3:34
17.	"Excuse Me"	Gilyard; Paris Jones; Reynard Tarleton	Ray Real	4:37
Total length:				60:51

Notes

- ^{^[c]} signifies a co-producer
- ^{^[a]} signifies an additional producer

== Personnel ==
Musicians

- Kevin Gates – vocals
- Jeff Vaughn – background vocals (track 2)
- Holly Seeley – background vocals (6)
- Earl Hood – keyboards (8), programming (8)
- Eric Goudy – keyboards (8)
- David D.A. Doman – drum programming, keyboards (10)
- Jim Stewart – additional guitar, additional keyboards (10)
- Micah Powell – all instruments (16)

Technical

- Chris Athens – mastering
- Joe Fitz – mixing (1, 3, 5, 7, 8, 14, 15, 17)
- Jaycen Joshua – mixing (2, 6, 9, 12, 16)
- Dan Weston – mixing (4, 10, 13)
- Millz – mixing (11), engineering (2, 4–6, 10–15, 17)
- Courtney Horton – mix engineering (5), mixing assistance (3, 7–9, 14, 15, 17)
- Brandon Thomas – engineering (1, 3, 6, 9, 15)
- Joshra Collins – engineering (1, 3, 16)
- Alex Toval – engineering (2)
- John Schullman – engineering (2)
- Thurston McCrea – engineering (5, 8)
- Christian Garcia – engineering (7)
- Kenneth "KP" Pruitt – engineering (16)
- Maddox Chimm – mixing assistance (2)
- Ryan Kaul – mixing assistance (2)
- Jeff Vaughn – engineering assistance (2, 3, 6, 7, 12)

== Charts ==
=== Weekly charts ===
Chart (2016)	Peak position
Canadian Albums (Billboard)	16
US Billboard 200	2
US Top R&B/Hip-Hop Albums (Billboard)	2
US Indie Store Album Sales (Billboard)	7

=== Year-end charts ===
Chart (2016)	Position
US Billboard 200	16
US Top R&B/Hip-Hop Albums (Billboard)	5
Chart (2017)	Position
US Billboard 200	85
US Top R&B/Hip-Hop Albums (Billboard)	67

=== Decade-end charts ===
Chart (2010–2019)	Position
US Billboard 200	171
US Top R&B/Hip-Hop Albums (Billboard)	35

== Certifications ==
Certifications for Islah
Region	Certification	Certified units/sales
United States (RIAA)	3× Platinum	3,000,000^{‡}
^{‡} Sales+streaming figures based on certification alone.
