= Sevyn Streeter discography =

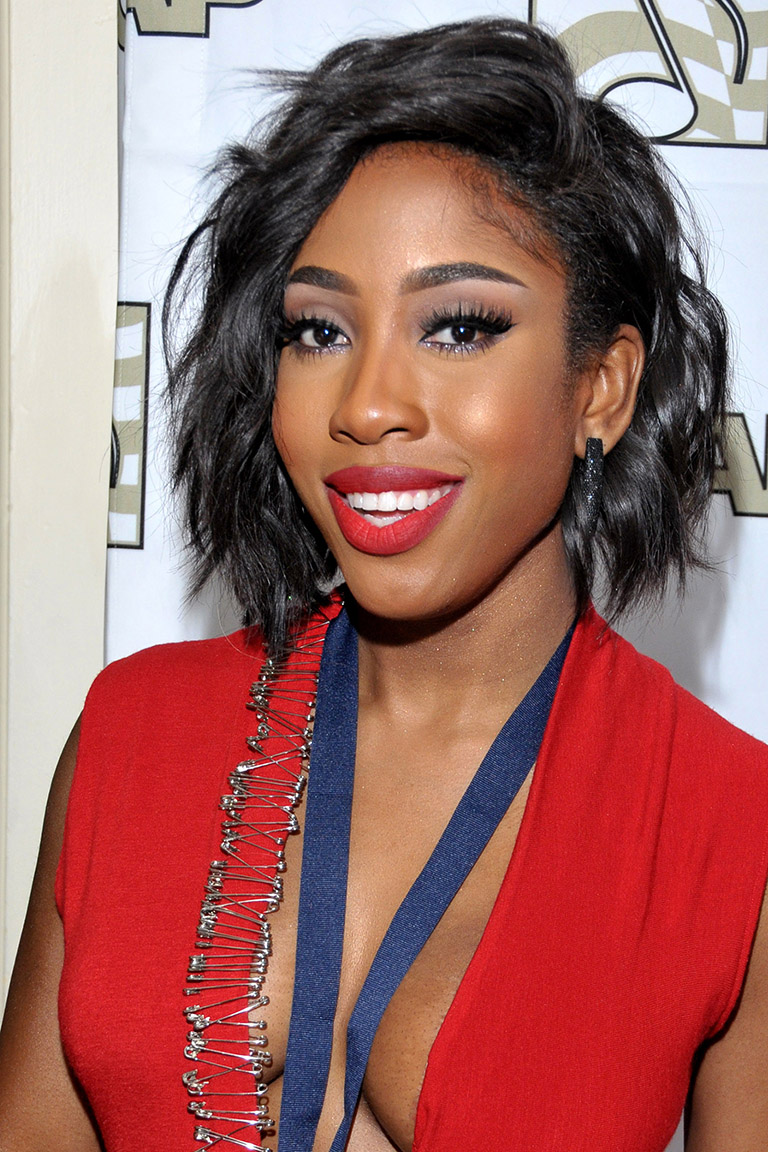
- Sevyn Streeter, Beverly Hills, California, June 25, 2015
- Studio albums: 2
- EPs: 2
- Soundtrack albums: 1
- Singles: 7
- Music videos: 12

The discography of Sevyn Streeter, an American R&B recording artist, consists of two studio albums, twelve singles, two EPs, and twenty-two music videos.

== Studio albums ==
List of albums, with selected information
| Title | Album details | Peak chart positions | |
| Title | Album details | US | US R&B/HH |
|---|---|---|---|
| Girl Disrupted | Released: July 7, 2017; Label: Atlantic; Format: Digital download | 92 | 44 |
| Drunken Wordz Sober Thoughtz | Released: September 17, 2021; Label: TStreetz, Groundwērk, eOne; Format: Digital download | — | — |

== Extended plays ==
List of EPs, with selected chart positions
| Title | Details | Peak chart positions | | |
| Title | Details | US | US R&B/HH | US R&B |
|---|---|---|---|---|
| Call Me Crazy, But... | Released: December 3, 2013; Label: Atlantic, CBE; Formats: CD, digital download | 30 | 5 | 3 |
| Shoulda Been There, Pt. 1 | Released: July 17, 2015; Label: Atlantic, CBE; Formats: Digital download | — | 15 | 4 |

== Singles ==
List of singles as lead artist, with selected chart positions and certifications, showing year released and album name
| Title | Year | Peak chart positions | | | | | | | Certifications | Album |
| Title | Year | US | US R&B/HH | US R&B | AUS | FRA | GER | SWI | Certifications | Album |
|---|---|---|---|---|---|---|---|---|---|---|
| "I Like It" | 2012 | — | 48 | — | — | — | — | — | | —N/a |
| "It Won't Stop" (featuring Chris Brown) | 2013 | 30 | 9 | 4 | — | — | — | — | RIAA: Platinum; BPI: Silver | Call Me Crazy, But... |
| "Next" | 2014 | 123 | 39 | 18 | — | — | — | — | | Call Me Crazy, But... |
| "Don't Kill the Fun" (featuring Chris Brown) | 2015 | — | 50 | 16 | — | — | — | — | | Shoulda Been There, Pt. 1 |
| "How Bad Do You Want It (Oh Yeah)" | 2015 | — | — | — | 91 | 137 | 67 | 65 | | Furious 7: Original Motion Picture Soundtrack |
| "4th Street" | 2015 | — | — | — | — | — | — | — | | —N/a |
| "Shoulda Been There" (featuring B.o.B) | 2015 | — | — | — | — | — | — | — | | Shoulda Been There, Pt. 1 |
| "Prolly" (featuring Gucci Mane) | 2016 | — | — | — | — | — | — | — | | —N/a |
| "My Love for You" | 2016 | — | — | — | — | — | — | — | | Girl Disrupted |
| "D4L" (featuring The-Dream) | 2016 | — | — | — | — | — | — | — | | —N/a |
| "Before I Do" | 2016 | — | — | 19 | — | — | — | — | | Girl Disrupted |
| "Fallen" (featuring Ty Dolla Sign and Cam Wallace) | 2017 | — | — | — | — | — | — | — | | Girl Disrupted |
| "Yernin" | 2018 | — | — | — | — | — | — | — | | —N/a |
| "Whatchusay" | 2019 | — | — | — | — | — | — | — | | —N/a |
| "HMU" | 2020 | — | — | — | — | — | — | — | | —N/a |
| "Kissez" (featuring Davido) | 2020 | — | — | — | — | — | — | — | | —N/a |
| "Guilty" (featuring Chris Brown and A$AP Ferg) | 2021 | — | — | — | — | — | — | — | | Drunken Wordz x Sober Thoughtz |
"—" denotes a title that did not chart, or was not released in that territory.

== Guest appearances ==
- "She Ain't You" (with Chris Brown) on F.A.M.E. (2011)
- "Don't Judge Me", "Biggest Fan", "Stuck on Stupid", "Party Hard / Cadillac (Interlude)", "Remember My Name", and "Touch Me" (with Chris Brown) on Fortune (2012)
- "John Doe (Remix)" (with B.o.B) (2013)
- "Swing My Way" (with B.o.B) on No Genre 2 (2014)
- "Love Life" (with B.o.B) on Psycadelik Thoughtz (2015)
- "Help Me" (with Puff Daddy) on MMM (Money Making Mitch) (2015)
- "Flex" (with Ingrid) on Trill Feels (2016)
- "From the Heart" (with Dave East) on Kairi Chanel (2016)
- "Parachute" (with Chris Brown) (2017)
- "Oh I" (with The Game, Jeremih and Young Thug) (2017)
- "No Reason" (with N.O.R.E.) (2018)
- "For You" (with. Trina) (2019)
- "Cry in Church" (with IDK) on USEE4YOURSELF (2021)
- "What About Us" (with Eric Bellinger) (2021)

== Music videos ==
| Title | Year | Artist |
|---|---|---|
| "Virginity" | 2002 | Tom Gurl Four |
| "He Ain't wit Me Now (Tho)" | 2009 | RichGirl |
| "Swagger Right" | 2010 | RichGirl |
| "I Like It" | 2012 | Sevyn Streeter |
| "It Won't Stop (featuring Chris Brown)" | 2013 | Sevyn Streeter |
| "Call Me Crazy" | 2013 | Sevyn Streeter |
| "Shattered" | 2013 | Sevyn Streeter |
| "Come on Over" | 2013 | Sevyn Streeter |
| "Next (featuring Kid Ink)" | 2014 | Sevyn Streeter |
| "Sex on the Ceiling" | 2014 | Sevyn Streeter |
| "Next (featuring YG)" | 2014 | Sevyn Streeter |
| "B.A.N.S." | 2014 | Sevyn Streeter |
| "Don't Kill the Fun (featuring Chris Brown)" | 2015 | Sevyn Streeter |
| "4th Street" | 2015 | Sevyn Streeter |
| "How Bad Do You Want It (Oh Yeah)" | 2015 | Sevyn Streeter |
| "Boomerang (featuring Hit-Boy)" | 2015 | Sevyn Streeter |
| "Prolly (featuring Gucci Mane)" | 2016 | Sevyn Streeter |
| "My Love for You" | 2016 | Sevyn Streeter |
| "D4L (featuring The-Dream)" | 2016 | Sevyn Streeter |
| "Before I Do" | 2016 | Sevyn Streeter |
| "Fallen (featuring Ty Dolla $ign & Cam Wallace)" | 2017 | Sevyn Streeter |
| "Anything You Want (featuring Ty Dolla $ign, Wiz Khalifa & Jeremih)" | 2017 | Sevyn Streeter |
| "Whatchusay" | 2019 | Sevyn Streeter |
| "HMU" | 2020 | Sevyn Streeter |
| "Kissez" (featuring Davido) | 2021 | Sevyn Streeter |
| "Guilty (featuring Chris Brown & A$AP Ferg)" | 2021 | Sevyn Streeter |
| "Wet Dreamz (featuring Jeremih)" | 2021 | Sevyn Streeter |

== Writing credits ==
Writing credits taken from ArtistDirect website.

List of songs written by Streeter, showing year released, song name and album name
| Year | Song | Artist | Album | Notes |
|---|---|---|---|---|
| 2008 | "Spaced Out" | Cheri Dennis | In and Out of Love | Co-writer |
| 2010 | "Yeah 3x" | Chris Brown | F.A.M.E. | Co-writer |
| 2011 | "Next to You" (featuring Justin Bieber) | Chris Brown | F.A.M.E. | Co-writer |
| 2011 | "Wet the Bed" (featuring Ludacris) | Chris Brown | F.A.M.E. | Co-writer |
| 2011 | "Oh My Love" | Chris Brown | F.A.M.E. | Co-writer |
| 2011 | "Bomb" (featuring Wiz Khalifa) | Chris Brown | F.A.M.E. | Co-writer |
| 2011 | "Beg for It" | Chris Brown | F.A.M.E. | Co-writer |
| 2011 | "Keep It Between Us" | Kelly Rowland | Here I Am | Co-writer |
| 2011 | "Miss Me With That" | Mary J. Blige | My Life II... The Journey Continues (Act 1) | Co-writer |
| 2011 | "Strip" (featuring Kevin McCall) | Chris Brown | Fortune | Co-writer |
| 2012 | "Biggest Fan" | Chris Brown | Fortune | Co-writer |
| 2012 | "Party Hard / Cadillac (Interlude)" (featuring Sevyn) | Chris Brown | Fortune | Co-writer |
| 2012 | "Remember My Name" (featuring Sevyn) | Chris Brown | Fortune | Co-writer |
| 2012 | "Touch Me" (featuring Sevyn) | Chris Brown | Fortune | Co-writer |
| 2012 | "Do It Again" | Chris Brown | Fortune | Co-writer |
| 2012 | "International (Serious)" (featuring Chris Brown and Trey Songz) | Estelle | All of Me | Co-writer |
| 2012 | "Slower" | Brandy | Two Eleven | Co-writer |
| 2012 | "New Day | Alicia Keys | Girl on Fire | Co-writer |
| 2012 | "Limitedless" | Alicia Keys | Girl on Fire | Co-writer |
| 2013 | "The Way" | Ariana Grande | Yours Truly | Co-writer |
| 2013 | "Fine China" | Chris Brown | X | Co-writer |
| 2013 | "Gone" (featuring Wiz Khalifa) | Kelly Rowland | Talk a Good Game | Co-writer |
| 2013 | "Put Your Name on It" | Kelly Rowland | Talk a Good Game | Co-writer |
| 2013 | "Get It Right" | Fantasia Barrino | Side Effects of You | Co-writer |
| 2013 | "End of Me" | Fantasia Barrino | Side Effects of You | Co-writer |
| 2013 | "All the Way Home" | Tamar Braxton | Love and War | Co-writer |
| 2013 | "Pieces" | Tamar Braxton | Love and War | Co-writer |
| 2014 | "X" | Chris Brown | X | Co-writer |
| 2014 | "The Way" | Paula DeAnda | Non-album single | Co-writer |
| 2015 | "Coming Home" | Tamar Braxton | Calling All Lovers | Co-writer |
| 2017 | "You Like" | Chris Brown | Heartbreak on a Full Moon | Co-writer |
| 2020 | "Talk 2 Me Baby" | The Bonfyre | Love, Lust & Let Downs: Chapter One - EP | Co-writer |
| 2024 | "Caught Up" | Flo | Access All Areas | Co-writer |
| 2024 | "AAA" | Flo | Access All Areas | Co-writer |
| 2024 | "Distance" | Normani | Dopamine | Co-writer |
| 2024 | "Problematic" | ¥$ | Vultures 1 | Co-writer |
| 2025 | "Heaven" | Halle Bailey | Love?... or Something Like It | Co-writer |
| 2026 | "Touche" | Flo | Therapy at the Club | |
| 2026 | "Pose" (featuring Juicy J) | Flo | Therapy at the Club | |
| 2026 | "Call Me" | Flo | Therapy at the Club | |
| 2026 | "Love or Something Like It" (featuring Lucky Daye) | Halle Bailey | Love?... or Something Like It (Deluxe Edition) | |
