= Eric Bellinger =

American singer and songwriter (born 1984)

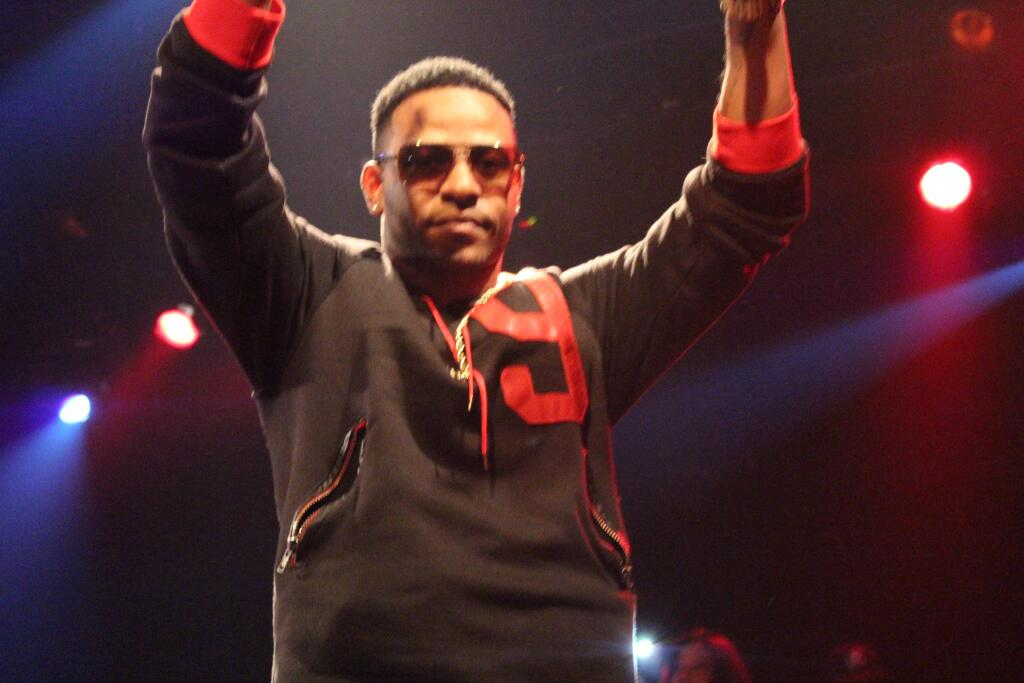
- Bellinger performing in 2013

Background information
- Born: Eric Aldwin Bellinger Jr. March 27, 1984 (age 42); Norwalk, California, U.S.
- Genre: R&B
- Occupations: Singer; songwriter; record producer
- Years active: 2010–present
- Labels: Roc Nation; YFS (Your Favorite Song); EMPIRE; 300; Atlantic; New Life; ADA
- Formerly of: The Writing Camp
- Spouse: La'Myia Good (m. 2015)
- Children: 2
- Website: ericbellinger.com

Eric Aldwin Bellinger Jr. (born March 27, 1984) is an American R&B singer and songwriter. He began songwriting in 2010, and has co-written singles including "Lemme See" by Usher, "New Flame" by Chris Brown, "Right Here" by Justin Bieber, "On Chill" by Wale, and "Music Sounds Better with U" by Big Time Rush. His contributions to Brown's album F.A.M.E. (2011) yielded his first Grammy Award.

As a recording artist, he made his debut as a guest performer on the album A Year Without Rain (2010) by Selena Gomez & the Scene. In 2014, Bellinger returned to his recording career and released his debut studio album, The Rebirth in February of that year. He signed with 300 Entertainment to release the extended plays Eric B for President: Term 1 (2016) and Eric B for President: Term 2 (2017).

== Early life ==
Bellinger was raised in Los Angeles, California, but attended schools in the Norwalk and Santa Fe Springs area, where he met his future manager Nieman Johnson. Bellinger is the grandson of Jackson 5 songwriter Bobby Day.

== Career ==
=== The Writing Camp and early career ===
Bellinger had earned a football scholarship to University of Southern California, but rejected the offer to record and tour with R&B group AKNU. The group was signed to Epic Records by executives Max Gousse and Tommy Mottola, and in 2010 he was invited to work with songwriting collective The Writing Camp by childhood friend and mentor Erika Nuri. Bellinger first co-wrote for pop acts such as Selena Gomez and the Scene, Jacob Latimore, and Big Time Rush, until 2012 when he contributed to the song "Death Penalty" on Los Angeles rapper The Game's mixtape California Republic. Bellinger's connection with The Game led to him writing and featuring on several songs off The Game's album The Documentary 2, for which he received greater recognition and signed a publishing deal with Sony ATV. However, complications with Bellinger's songwriting catalogue caused him to leave Sony ATV to sign with publisher BMI.

=== Solo career and The Rebirth ===
In 2013, Bellinger released a three-part series of mixtapes: Born II Sing Vol. 1, Born II Sing Vol. 2, and Born II Sing Vol. 3. Bellinger released his debut studio album, The Rebirth, on May 17, 2014, as a double album. The Rebirth peaked at 23 on the US R&B/Hip Hop charts, and 15 on the US R&B chart, and also entered the Heatseakers Albums chart.

Bellinger followed The Rebirth with the studio albums, Cuffing Season and Cuffing Season, Part 2, which released in July 2015 and December 2015, respectively. Cuffing Season peaked at 6 on the US R&B chart, while Cuffing Season, Part 2 peaked at 23.

Bellinger released two mixtapes in the spring of 2016, Choose Up Season and Eventually. Choose Up Season featured the song "Valet" featuring Fetty Wap and 2 Chainz.

Between 2016 and 2017, Bellinger released three extended plays as part of the Eric B. for President series, the title referencing the Eric B & Rakim song "Eric B. Is President". The Eric B. for President series featured two full-instrumental extended plays: Eric B for President: Term 1, released on September 9, 2016, an acoustic remake of the EP titled Term 1, titled Eric B for President: Term 1 (Acoustic), released on January 20, 2017, and Eric B for President: Term 2, released on March 10, 2017. G.O.A.T. (combiner two version) and Drive By Certifications Gold from RIAA.

On April 6, 2018, Bellinger released the album Eazy Call. One month later, while on his Eazy Call Tour, Bellinger released a 5-track EP, Meditation Music, to commemorate National Meditation Day (May 21). This project was inspired by yoga and meditation which he claimed changed his life for the better. The 5 tracks ("Meditate", "Frequency" (ft. Blaq Tuxedo), "Chakras", "Hours" and "Massage") were later joined into a single 20min track titled after the EP name, Meditation Music.

On September 10, 2021, Bellinger released New Light, the album which earned him his first Grammy nomination as an artist: Best Progressive R&B Album. In May 2022, Bellinger announced his publishing deal with Roc Nation. It was also announced that he performs the theme song of the Sesame Street spinoff series Mecha Builders, alongside Shanice.

=== Awards ===
As a songwriter

In 2011, Bellinger won a Grammy in the category of Best R&B Album for his work on F.A.M.E. by Chris Brown.

As a songwriter, he was nominated three other times for a Grammy: two nominations for Best Urban Contemporary Album (Fortunate and X by Chris Brown) and one nomination for Best R&B Song (for "New Flame" from X by Chris Brown).

In 2013, Bellinger co-wrote "Lemme See" by Usher, which was named an ASCAP Award Winning R&B/Hip-Hop Song.

As an artist

As an artist, Bellinger's album "New Light" (2021) received a nomination for Best Progressive R&B Album at the 64th Annual Grammy Awards.

Year	Nominee / work	Ceremony	Category	Result
2012	F.A.M.E. by Chris Brown (as a songwriter)	54th Annual Grammy Awards	Best R&B Album	Won
2013	Fortune by Chris Brown (as a songwriter)	54th Annual Grammy Awards	Best Urban Contemporary Album	Nominated
2015	X by Chris Brown (as a songwriter)	57th Annual Grammy Awards	Best Urban Contemporary Album	Nominated
2015	"New Flame" by Chris Brown (as a songwriter)	57th Annual Grammy Awards	Best R&B Song	Nominated
2022	New Light by Eric Bellinger (as an artist)	64th Annual Grammy Awards	Best Progressive R&B Album	Nominated

== Personal life ==
On January 1, 2015, Bellinger married La'Myia Good. Bellinger and Good met in the early 2000s in Los Angeles, where both were working on music with the same manager before losing contact for a few years; they re-connected later. Bellinger and Good have two sons, Elysha and Eazy Bellinger. Bellinger is the brother-in-law of Meagan Good.

== Discography ==
=== Studio albums ===
List of albums, with selected chart positions
Title	Album details	Peak chart positions		
Title	Album details	US	US R&B/ HH	US R&B
The Rebirth	Released: May 17, 2014; Label: YFS/ReBirth; Format: Digital download	— (Note: "The Rebirth" did not enter the Billboard 200, but peaked at number seven on the Heatseekers Albums chart, which acts as a 25-album extension to the Top 200 albums chart.)	23	15
Cuffing Season	Released: July 17, 2015; Label: YFS/300; Format: Digital download	— (Note: "Cuffing Season" did not enter the Billboard 200, but peaked at number six on the Heatseekers Albums chart, which acts as a 25-album extension to the Top 200 albums chart.)	—	6
Cuffing Season, Part 2	Released: December 4, 2015; Label: YFS/300; Format: Digital download	— (Note: "Cuffing Season, Part 2" did not enter the Billboard 200, but peaked at number twelve on the Heatseekers Albums chart, which acts as a 25-album extension to the Top 200 albums chart.)	—	23
Eazy Call	Released: April 6, 2018; Label: YFS/Empire; Format: Digital download	192	—	—
The Rebirth 2	Released: February 22, 2019; Label: YFS/Empire; Format: Digital download	133	—	—
Saved by the Bellinger	Released: September 27, 2019; Label: YFS/Empire; Format: Digital download, streaming	—	—	—
Cuffing Season, Part 3	Released: November 22, 2019; Label: YFS/Empire; Format: Digital download, streaming			
New Light	Released: September 10, 2021; Label: YFS/Empire; Format: Digital download, streaming	—	—	—
The Rebirth 3: The Party & The Bedroom	Released: March 1, 2024; Label: All Wins Ent./Compound Interest; Format: Digital download, streaming	—	—	—
It'll All Make Sense Later	Released: November 22, 2024; Label: All Wins Ent./FTS Global Management; Format: Digital download			
It All Makes Sense	Released: September 26, 2025; Label: All Wins Ent./FTS Global Management; Format: Digital download			
"—" denotes a title that did not chart, or was not released in that territory.

=== Collaborative albums ===
Title	Album details
Nine (as "Poncho Belly & Dizzle", with A.D.)	Released: October 24, 2018; Label: poncho belly; Format: Digital download, streaming
Scenarios (with Chase N. Cash)	Released: February 14, 2020; Label: YFS/Empire; Format: Digital download, streaming
Optimal Music (with Nieman J)	Released: April 24, 2020; Label: OFF TOP Records; Format: Digital download, streaming
1-800-HIT-EAZY (with Hitmaka)	Released: February 12, 2021; Label: YFM/Atlantic/YFS/Empire; Formats: CD, LP, digital download, streaming
1(800)HIT-EAZY: Line 2 (with Hitmaka)	Released: February 10, 2023; Label: All Wins Ent./Empire; Formats: CD, LP, digital download, streaming

=== Extended plays ===
List of extended plays, with selected chart positions
Title	Album details	Peak chart positions		
Title	Album details	US	US R&B/HH	US R&B
In The Meantime	Released: April 15, 2013; Label: YFS; Format: Digital download			
In The Meantime Pt. 2	Released: November 20, 2015; Label: YFS; Format: Streaming			
Eric B for President: Term 1	Released: September 9, 2016; Label: YFS; Format: Digital download	— (Note: "Eric B for President: Term 1" did not enter the Billboard 200, but peaked at number twelve on the Heatseekers Albums chart, which acts as a 25-album extension to the Top 200 albums chart.)	32	14
Eric B for President: Term 2	Released: March 10, 2017; Label: YFS/Empire; Format: Digital download, streaming	— (Note: "Eric B for President: Term 2" did not enter the Billboard 200, but peaked at number twenty-four on the Heatseekers Albums chart, which acts as a 25-album extension to the Top 200 albums chart.)	—	16
Cannabliss	Released: April 20, 2017; Label: YFS; Format: Digital download, streaming			
Meditation Music	Released: May 31, 2018; Label: YFS/Empire; Format: Digital download, streaming			
Feelin' Like Christmas (with Lauren Evans, Que Derry)	Released: August 1, 2020; Label: The MADE Series; Format: Digital download, streaming			
Genius	Released: October 1, 2020; Label: The MADE Series; Format: Digital download, streaming			
Eric B for President: Term 3	Released: October 30, 2020; Label: YFS/Empire; Format: Digital download, streaming			
"—" denotes a title that did not chart, or was not released in that territory.

=== Mixtapes ===
List of mixtapes
Title	Mixtape details
Born II Sing Vol. 1	Released: April 15, 2013; Label: YFS; Format: Free download
Born II Sing Vol. 2	Released: April 15, 2013; Label: YFS; Format: Free download
Born II Sing Vol. 3	Released: April 15, 2013; Label: YFS; Format: Free download
Your Favorite Christmas Songs	Released: December 10, 2013; Label: YFS/BCMG; Format:
Choose Up Season	Released: October 1, 2014; Label: YFS; Format: Digital download
Eventually	Released: May 27, 2016; Label: YFS/300; Format: Digital download
Eric B for President: Term 1 (Acoustic)	Released: January 20, 2017; Label: YFS/300; Format: Digital download
Eric B for President: Term 2 (Acoustic)	Released: September 8, 2017; Label: YFS/300; Format: Digital download
Hors D'oeuvres	Released: June 12, 2020; Label: YFS/Empire; Format: Digital download
Eric B for President: Term 3 (Acoustic)	Released: December 18, 2020; Label: YFS/Empire; Format: Digital download

=== Singles ===
- "I Don't Want Her" (2014)
  (featuring Problem)
- "Valet" (2015)
  (featuring Fetty Wap and 2 Chainz)
- "Type a Way" (2019)
  (featuring Chris Brown)
- "Moist" (2019)
  (featuring K Camp)
- "Only You" (2021)
  (with Hitmaka)
- "Hit Eazy" (2021)
  (with Hitmaka)
- "Gotta Have Faith" (2023)
  (with Slim & Faith Evans)
- "Curious" (2023)
  (with Fabolous and Cordae)
- "Gang Slide" (2024)
  (with Mozzy)

=== Songwriting credits ===
Year	Artist	Album	Notes
2010	Selena Gomez & The Scene	A Year Without Rain	Co-writer ("Intuition" feat. Eric Bellinger)
2011	Jacob Latimore	Nothing On Me	Co-writer ("Nothing On Me")
2011	Ashanti	The Woman You Love	Co-writer ("The Woman You Love")
2011	Big Time Rush, Mann	Elevate	Co-writer ("Music Sounds Better")
2011	Chris Brown	F.A.M.E.	Co-writer ("Oh My Love," "Say It With Me")
2012	Chris Brown	Fortune	Co-writer ("Wait For You", "Mirage")
2012	Brandy	2 Eleven	Co-writer ("Without You")
2012	Jennifer Hudson, Ne-Yo, Rick Ross	Think Like A Man	Co-writer ("Think Like A Man")
2012	Usher	Lookin 4 Myself	Co-writer ("Lemme See" feat. Rick Ross, "I Care For U", "What Happened To U")
2012	Justin Bieber	Believe	Co-writer ("Right Here" feat. Drake, "Thought Of You")
2012	Keke Palmer	Keke Palmer	Co-writer ("If 6 Were 9")
2012	B. Smyth	Leggo	Co-writer ("Leggo" ft. 2 Chainz)
2012	MKTO	MKTO	Co-writer ("Nowhere")
2013	Fantasia	Side Effect Of You	Co-writer ("So Much To Prove")
2013	League of Starz	What It Is	Co-writer ("What It Is" feat. Freddie Gibbz, Iamsu!, Eric Bellinger)
2013	Trevor Jackson	#NewThang	Co-writer ("New Thang")
2013	Marcus Canty	THIS... Is Marcus Canty	Co-writer ("In & Out" feat. Wale)
2013	Dev	Kiss It	Co-writer ("Kiss It" feat. Sage the Gemini)
2013	Sevyn Streeter	Call Me Crazy, But...	Co-writer ("Sex On The Ceiling", "B.A.N.S.")
2013	TGT	Three Kings	Co-writer ("No Fun")
2013	Sean Kingston	Back 2 Life	Co-writer ("Hold That" feat. Yo Gotti)
2013	Don Benjamin	Hit The Snooze!	Co-writer ("Hit The Snooze!" feat. Eric Bellinger)
2013	Bridget Kelly	Cut To... Bridget Kelly	Co-writer ("S#1T Happens")
2014	Chris Brown	X	Co-writer ("New Flame" feat Usher and Rick Ross, "Love More" feat. Nicki Minaj, "Fine China", "No Lights", "Add Me In", "Stereotype")
2014	Trey Songz	Trigga	Co-writer ("Disrespectful" feat. Mila J, "Love Around The World", "Serial" )
2014	Teyana Taylor	VII	Co-writer ("Broken Hearted Girl", "Outta My League")
2014	The Game	Year Of The Wolf	Co-writer ("On One" feat. Ty Dolla $ign & King Marie, "Best Head Ever" feat. Tyga & Eric Bellinger, "Or Nah" feat. Too $hort, Problem, AV, & Eric Bellinger)
2014	Sage the Gemini	Remember Me	Co-writer ("Second Hand Smoke" feat. Eric Bellinger)
2014	DJ Mustard	10 Summers	Co-writer ("4 Digits" feat. Fabolous, Eric Bellinger)
2014	Kid Ink	My Own Lane	Co-writer ("Rollin'")
2014	Omarion	You Like It	Co-writer ("You Like It")
2014	Ma$e	Nothing	Co-writer ("Nothing" feat. Eric Bellinger)
2014	Jae Murphy	You Playin' (This Could Be Us)	Co-writer ("You Playin' (This Could Be Us)" feat. The Game, Eric Bellinger, Problem)
2014	DJ Carisma	Anyway	Co-writer ("Anyway" feat. Tory Lanez, Sage the Gemini, Eric Bellinger, Mishon
2014	Rayven Justice	I Have A Dream	Co-writer ("My Yang" feat. Eric Bellinger)
2014	Don Benjamin	Jealous	Co-writer ("Jealous" feat. Eric Bellinger)
2014	Angel	Possession With Intent	Co-writer ("On The Low" feat. Eric Bellinger & Wretch 32)
2014	Jinsu	Built To Last	Co-writer ("Out With The Old" feat. Eric Bellinger)
2014	Lyrica Anderson	Freakin (Remix)	Co-writer ("Freakin (Remix)" feat. Wiz Khalifa, Eric Bellinger)
2015	Tyrese	Black Rose	Co-writer ("I Still Do", "Dumb Shit" feat. Snoop Dogg)
2015	The Game	The Documentary 2	Co-writer ("Circles" feat. Q-Tip, Eric Bellinger & Sha Sha)
2015	Mally Mall	EMPIRE Presents: Triple X-Mas	Co-writer ("Freak" feat. Eric Bellinger, Chinx, Too $hort)
2015	Atla	Something Real	Co-writer ("Something Real" feat. Eric Bellinger)
2015	Dean	I'm Not Sorry	Co-writer ("I'm Not Sorry" feat. Eric Bellinger)
2015	DaBoyDame	Do Ya	Co-writer ("Do Ya" feat. Ty Dolla $ign, Adrian Marcel, & Eric Bellinger)
2015	Elijah Blake	Shadows & Diamonds	Co-writer ("Armageddon")
2015	DJ Nemo	Round Here	Co-writer ("Round Here" feat. Joe Moses, Eric Bellinger)
2015	AD	Blue 89	Co-writer ("I Go In" feat. Eric Bellinger)
2015	Kalin and Myles	Kalin and Myles	Co-writer ("Hands All Over You", "Curfew Overtime")
2015	Da Brat	#YAK (You Already Know)	Co-writer ("#YAK" feat. Sage the Gemini & Eric Bellinger)
2015	Sevyn Streeter	Shoulda Been There, Pt. 1	Co-writer ("Boomerang" (featuring Hit-Boy))
2016	Bulby York	Epic & Ting	Composer
2016	Tank	Sex Love Pain II	Co-writer ("You Don't Know")
2017	Sevyn Streeter	Girl Disrupted	Co-writer ("Peace Sign" (featuring Dave East))
2017	Ai	Wa to Yo	Co-writer ("Welcome to My City" feat. Eric Bellinger & Junior Reid)
2018	Teyana Taylor	K.T.S.E.	Co-writer ("3Way")
2019	Teyana Taylor	The Album	Co-writer ("How You Want It?", "69")
2021	Kristinia DeBarge	Bet	Co-writer ("Bet")
2021	VEDO	1320	Co-writer ("Energy")
2021	Kelvin Truitt	Opposite	Co-writer ("Opposite")
2022	Chris Brown	"Iffy"	Co-writer ("Iffy")
2024	P1Harmony	Killin' It	Composer ("Everybody Clap")

=== Guest appearances ===
- 2011
  - "Whatever" (with Ashlyne Huff on Let It Out)
- 2013
  - "Don't Wanna Fall In Love" (with Lil Rob on "Don't Wanna Fall In Love" single)
- 2016

"Stay Away" (with E-40 on The D-Boy Diary: Book 1

"I'm Not Sorry" (with DEAN)

- 2017
  - "Welcome to My City" (with Ai & Junior Reid on Wa to Yo)
- 2020:
  - "How I Feel" (with T.I. and Killer Mike on The L.I.B.R.A.)
- 2021:
  - "Over the Moon" (with Oso)
  - "Bet" (with Kristinia DeBarge)
  - "Filet Mignon" (with Jim Jones)
  - "Single & Happy" (with Kash Doll & Wale)
  - "World Is One" (with Chuu and Kim Yo-han)
  - "Energy" (with VEDO on 1320)
  - "On My Way" (with DJ Era, O.T. Genasis & AD)
