= Before I Do =

Single by Sevyn Streeter

from the album Girl Disrupted
- Released: December 2, 2016
- Recorded: 2016
- Genre: R&B
- Length: 3:57
- Label: Atlantic
- Songwriters: Streeter; Felisha King; Jonathan Yip; Ray Romulus; Jeremy Reeves; Ray Charles McCullough II; Isley Brothers; Chris Jasper
- Producer: The Stereotypes

Sevyn Streeter singles chronology
"D4L" (2016)	"Before I Do" (2016)	"Fallen" (2017)

"Before I Do" is a song recorded by American R&B singer Sevyn Streeter from her debut studio album, Girl Disrupted (2017). The song was produced by Micah Powell, B Harv and The Stereotypes. It was released as the album's second single on December 2, 2016 through Atlantic Records. The song samples "(At Your Best) You Are Love" by the late singer Aaliyah, which is an Isley Brothers cover.

== Background and composition ==
The song was premiered at Rap-Up LIVE on October 18, 2016 along with songs "My Love for You", "D4L" and a soulful cover of Lauryn Hill’s "Ex-Factor". On December 2, 2016 "Before I Do" was released digitally as a single on iTunes. On December 4, 2016, Streeter posted three pictures taken from the set of the music video with lyrics from the song on and hashtags "#BEFOREIDO #VIDEOMONDAY #GIRLDISRUPTED" revealing the video would be released on December 5, 2016. In an interview with Fuse Streeter described the track to be influenced by the late R&B singer Aaliyah.

== Critical reception ==
The song was well received by critics. Rap-Up stated in a review "Sevyn Streeter is set to release her debut album next year, but before 2016 is over, she’s giving fans another taste of Girl Disrupted with “Before I Do.” The stripped-down R&B jam finds the Haines City songstress ready to take her relationship to the next level, but before she does, she wants to make sure her man is the right one." HotNewHipHop said in a review "Sevyn Streeter has a voice of velvet, and on her new single "Before I Do," she lets those uniquely soothing vocals loose. Over an old school 90's R&B beat, she investigates a potential lover before allowing him to smash." Singersroom stated in a review "Sevyn Streeter continues to heighten anticipation around her forthcoming debut album, Girl Disrupted, with the release of the new record, Before I Do. On the stripped-down tune, the R&B songstress finds herself in the gray area of love: she’s trying to figure out if her boo is real or if he’s unfaithful.

== Music video ==
A teaser video was released to Streeter's YouTube account on December 2, 2016. The music video was released to Streeter's YouTube account on December 5, 2016, directed by Mike Ho who previously directed "My Love for You.

== Live performances ==
During television network's Revolt Sessions Streeter performed tracks "My Love for You", "Before I Do", "D4L", "Prolly" from her upcoming album and "Shattered" from the extended play (EP) Call Me Crazy, But.... Streeter performed the song on The Wendy Williams Show on July 11, 2017.

== Track listings and formats ==
Digital download

1. "Before I Do" – 3:57

== Charts ==
Chart (2017)	Peak position
US R&B/Hip-Hop Airplay (Billboard)	15
US Adult R&B Songs (Billboard)	1

== Release history ==
Region	Date	Format	Label	Ref
Worldwide	December 2, 2016	Digital download	Atlantic Records	
