= Love U Better =

Single by Ty Dolla Sign featuring Lil Wayne and The-Dream

from the album Beach House 3
- Released: July 10, 2017
- Genre: Electro-R&B
- Length: 3:03
- Label: Atlantic
- Songwriters: Tyrone Griffin, Jr.; Dwayne Carter, Jr.; Terius Nash; Dijon McFarlane; Nick Audino; Lewis Hughes; Nashiem Myrick; Mary J. Blige; Kimberly Jones; Bryson; Carlos Broady; Xenos da Costa; LaTonya Blige da Costa
- Producers: DJ Mustard; Twice as Nice

Ty Dolla Sign singles chronology
"Whatever You Need" (2017)	"Love U Better" (2017)	"Ego" (2017)

Lil Wayne singles chronology
"The Way I Are (Dance with Somebody)" (2017)	"Love U Better" (2017)	"Like a Man" (2017)

The-Dream singles chronology
"D4L" (2016)	"Love U Better" (2017)

"Love U Better" is a song by American singer Ty Dolla $ign featuring American rapper Lil Wayne and fellow American singer The-Dream. It was released on July 10, 2017, as the lead single from the former's second studio album, Beach House 3 (2017).

== Release and composition ==
Ty Dolla Sign announced "Love U Better" on July 7, 2017, and shared the single's artwork on his social media accounts. The song premiered via Zane Lowe's Beats 1 radio show on July 10, and was released for digital download as a single on the same day. It was sent to urban radio July 25, 2017. "Love U Better" has been described as an electro-R&B track by Rolling Stone. It contains a sample from 1997 song "I Can Love You" by singer Mary J. Blige.

== Commercial performance ==
"Love U Better" peaked at number 12 on the Billboard Bubbling Under Hot 100, performing modestly on radio . In New Zealand, the song reached number 49, as well as number 97 In Australia.

== Music video ==
The music video for the song, directed by Ryan Hope, was shot in the Hollywood Hills and premiered via Ty Dolla Sign's YouTube channel on August 3, 2017. It features cameo appearances from YG, Sevyn Streeter, Jeremih and Trae tha Truth. It also features Jhene Aiko and Big Sean with Wizkid.

== Charts ==
Chart (2017)	Peak position
Australia (ARIA)	97
US Bubbling Under Hot 100 (Billboard)	12
US Bubbling Under R&B/Hip-Hop Singles (Billboard)	1
US Rhythmic Airplay (Billboard)	20

== Certifications ==
Region	Certification	Certified units/sales
United States (RIAA)	Gold	500,000^{‡}
^{‡} Sales+streaming figures based on certification alone.

== Release history ==
Region	Date	Format	Label	Ref.
United States	10 July 2017	Digital download	Taylor Gang; Atlantic	
United States	25 July 2017	Urban radio	Taylor Gang; Atlantic	
