= So Am I (Ty Dolla Sign song) =

Single by Ty Dolla Sign featuring Damian Marley and Skrillex

from the album Beach House 3
- Released: September 1, 2017
- Genre: Tropical; club
- Length: 3:45
- Label: Atlantic; WEA
- Songwriters: Griffin, Jr. Damian Marley, Boyd S. Moore Sirota
- Producer: Skrillex

Ty Dolla Sign singles chronology
"Ego" (2017)	"So Am I" (2017)	"Ex" (2017)

Damian Marley singles chronology
"Medication" (2017)	"So Am I" (2017)	"Living It Up" (2018)

Skrillex singles chronology
"Favor" (2017)	"So Am I" (2017)	"GOH" (2018)

"So Am I" is a song by American singer Ty Dolla Sign. It was released through Atlantic Records and WEA International on September 1, 2017, as the second single from his second studio album, Beach House 3 (2017). The song features Jamaican reggae artist Damian Marley and American electronic dance music producer Skrillex, the latter of whom is sole producer of the song.

== Background ==
Sign told Billboard in an interview that he is "trying out 'new reggae'" with the song. It was uploaded to SoundCloud on August 28, 2017, but was unavailable for streaming. On the same day, both Sign and Skrillex teased the track on Twitter. Sign tweeted the single artwork, which features a miniature figurine of him surfing on a tongue. On August 31, 2017, the song was leaked in full ahead of release.

== Critical reception ==
Andrew Rafter of DJ Mag opined that Skrillex, whom he referred as "the king of dubstep", have forgone his usual style for a song that is "a lot closer to what you might expect from Damian Marley and Ty Dolla Sign". Emmanuel C.M. of XXL described the song as "an excellent blend of their respective styles into a cohesive final product". Similarly, Rap-Up wrote that the song "blends their varied musical styles into one banger". Patrick Lyons of Merry Jane stated that Sign's voice sounds like "he's been doing Jamaican-inflected pop his entire life", and he appreciates that Sign is "actually working with Skrillex". Kevin Goddard of HotNewHipHop regarded the song as a "pop-friendly record" and opined that Skrillex supplied "dance-friendly production". Bianca Gracie of Fuse wrote that the song's "warm, sunny vibes" will make the listeners "wish summer was year-round". Matthew Meadow of Your EDM felt the song "features subtle, but recognizable production from Skrillex on a smooth and tropical sound", but is "not particularly a 'summer hit'". Erik of EDM Sauce deemed the song as "an almost entirely reggae tune" and "a downtempo, tradition Jamaican track", he felt "everything flows perfect from one style to another". Hunter Thompson of Run the Trap called the song "a very chill, island inspired soon to be radio hit", and felt it is "a blaring dubstep track". He noted that it would be played frequently everywhere "as summer begins to wind down" and he expect "some pretty dope remixes" of this track. Alex Ross of Vice wrote a negative review of the song, faulting the reggae beat that was "squeezed tightly through Skrillex's desk", which "actively distracts from Ty and Marley's vocals", and blaming Skrillex exclusively for making it "ends up sounding like a Fyre Festival promo", but not "a fun blend of styles between Ty and Marley".

== Charts ==
Chart (2017)	Peak position
New Zealand Heatseekers (RMNZ)	6
