= Luca Brasi 2 =

Mixtape by Kevin Gates
- Released: December 14, 2014
- Recorded: 2014
- Genre: Hip hop
- Length: 63:15
- Label: Bread Winners' Association; Atlantic
- Producer: Big Hurt Tracks; Nic Nac; Mark Kragen; Red on da Track; Capo Red; Touchdown; Beat Zombie; The Runners; The Monarch; Rico Love; Diego Ave; Bobby Johnson; D-Town; B.o.B; Kane Beatz; JMike; TODAY; Earl & E; FRESHM3N III; Go Grizzly; P-Lo (of The Invasion); Mark Nilan Jr.; Jaque Beats; Deezy; President Jeff; The Featherstones

Kevin Gates chronology
By Any Means (2014)	Luca Brasi 2 (2014)	Murder for Hire (2015)

Singles from Luca Brasi 2
- 1. "I Don't Get Tired" Released: December 20, 2014

Luca Brasi 2 is the twelfth commercial mixtape by American rapper Kevin Gates. It was released on December 14, 2014, through his own independent record label Bread Winners' Association and Atlantic Records.

== Commercial performance ==
Luca Brasi 2 debuted at number 38 on the US Billboard 200, with 26,224 album-equivalent units (including pure album sales of 22,892 copies) in its first week. As of October 2015, the album has sold 83,000 copies in the United States. On September 7, 2018, the mixtape was certified platinum by the Recording Industry Association of America (RIAA) for combined sales and album-equivalent units of over a million units in the United States.

== Track listing ==
No.	Title	Producer(s)	Length
1.	"Luca Brasi Intro"	Big Hurt Tracks	2:35
2.	"I Don't Get Tired" (featuring August Alsina)	Nic Nac; Mark Kragen	3:30
3.	"John Gotti"	Red on da Track; Capo Red	3:45
4.	"Perfect Imperfection"	Red on da Track; Touchdown	3:59
5.	"Plug Daughter"	Beat Zombie	2:24
6.	"Out the Mud"	The Runners; The Monarch	4:01
7.	"Thugged Out" (featuring Boobie Black)	Rico Love; Diego Ave	3:14
8.	"Sit Down"	Bobby Johnson	4:20
9.	"Complaining" (featuring Rico Love)	Rico Love; D-Town	4:03
10.	"Talk on Phones"	B.o.B	2:55
11.	"Wassup with It"	Kane Beatz; JMIKE; TODAY	3:13
12.	"Don't Panic"	Earl & E; Diego Ave	3:50
13.	"Break the Bitch Down" (featuring K Camp)	FRESHM3N III; Go Grizzly	3:01
14.	"In My Feelings"	P-Lo; Mark Nilan Jr.	4:05
15.	"Pourin the Syrup"	Jaque Beats	3:49
16.	"Wild Ride"	DZY; Prezident Jeff	4:18
17.	"Word Around Town" (featuring Rich Homie Quan)	The Featherstones	3:12
18.	"Making Love"	Beat Zombie	3:40
Total length:			1:04:00

== Charts ==
=== Weekly charts ===
Chart (2014)	Peak position
US Billboard 200	38
US Top R&B/Hip-Hop Albums (Billboard)	5

=== Year-end charts ===
Chart (2015)	Position
US Billboard 200	196
US Top R&B/Hip-Hop Albums (Billboard)	56

== Certifications ==
Region	Certification	Certified units/sales
United States (RIAA)	Platinum	1,000,000^{‡}
^{‡} Sales+streaming figures based on certification alone.
