= Full Speed (album) =

Studio album by Kid Ink
- Released: January 30, 2015
- Recorded: 2013–14
- Genre: Hip hop
- Length: 40:08 (standard edition); 50:42 (deluxe edition)
- Label: Tha Alumni; 88 Classic; RCA
- Producer: Lu Diaz; Ben Billions; C.P Dubb; Cashmere Cat; David D.A. Doman; DJ Dahi; DJ Mustard; Twice as Nice; DJ Spinz; The Featherstones; J-Holt; JGramm; Josh Werner; Key Wane; Mark Kragen; Metro Boomin; Ned Cameron; Nic Nac; Peter Wade; The Pioneer Crew; REO; StarGate

Kid Ink chronology
My Own Lane (2014)	Full Speed (2015)	Summer in the Winter (2015)

Singles from Full Speed
- 1. "Body Language" Released: September 9, 2014; 2. "Hotel" Released: January 9, 2015; 3. "Be Real" Released: March 31, 2015; 4. "Dolo" Released: August 6, 2015

Full Speed is the third studio album by American rapper Kid Ink. It was released on January 30, 2015, by RCA Records, distributed by these affiliated record labels Tha Alumni Music Group and 88 Classic. The album marks as the second release with the RCA Records. The album was supported by three singles: "Body Language" featuring Usher and Tinashe, "Hotel" featuring Chris Brown, and "Be Real" featuring Dej Loaf.

Following its release, the album was met with mixed reviews from music critics. The album debuted at number 14 on the Billboard 200, selling 29,000 copies in the United States, during its first week.

== Singles ==
Kid Ink released the song, titled "Body Language", as the album's lead single on September 9, 2014. The track features a hook performed by American singer Usher and background vocals by a fellow R&B singer Tinashe. The song was produced by Cashmere Cat and Stargate.

"Hotel", which features the guest vocals from American recording artist Chris Brown, was made available to purchase on the iTunes Store on January 9, 2015. It was sent to US urban adult contemporary radio on January 27, 2015, as the album's second single. The song was produced by The Featherstones.

"Be Real", which features guest vocals from a fellow recording artist Dej Loaf, was sent to rhythmic contemporary radio on March 31, 2015, as the album's third single. The song's production was handled by DJ Mustard, while it co-produced by JGramm Beats.

"Dolo", which features guest vocals from American R&B singer R. Kelly, was sent to rhythmic contemporary radio on August 6, 2015, as the album's fourth single. The song's produced by Nic Nac and Mark Kragen.

=== Promotional singles ===
The album's first promotional single, titled "Cool Back" was made available to digital download on December 16, 2014, with album pre-orders on the iTunes Store. The song was produced by C.P Dubb.

The album's second promotional single, titled "Blunted" was made available to digital download, with album pre-orders on December 23, 2014. The song was produced by REO (written by Ramon Owen).

The album's third promotional single, "Like a Hott Boyy" featuring Young Thug and Bricc Baby Shitro, was made available to digital download on January 13, 2015. The song was produced by Metro Boomin and DJ Spinz.

=== Other songs ===
The track "Faster" was featured as the official theme song of WWE's pay-per-view; Fastlane. Kid Ink is a long time fan of WWE.

== Critical reception ==
Professional ratings
Aggregate scores
Source	Rating
Metacritic	55/100
Review scores
Source	Rating
AllMusic	3.5/5 stars
Artistdirect	4.5/5 stars
Billboard	3/5 stars
Complex	3/5 stars
Knoxville News Sentinel	3.5/5 stars
Rolling Stone	2.5/5 stars
Spin	4/10
XXL	XL

At Metacritic, which assigns a normalized rating out of 100 to reviews from critics, the album received an average score of 55, based on 10 reviews, indicating "mixed or average reviews". Craig Jenkins of Billboard said "Ink has clearly studied his success, and it feels strategic that Full Speed is sardine-packed with star collaborators." In a similar review, Kellan Miller of HipHopDX said "Most of the songs on Full Speed are catchy in their own right, but on the heels of tracks that sound so much alike just now seeing their expiration on radio, the feeling is mixed at best."

== Commercial performance ==
The album debuted at number 14 on the Billboard 200, selling 29,000 copies in the United States. In its second week, the album dropped down to number 41 on the chart, selling 8,000 copies, bringing total album sales to 37,000 copies. In the third week, the album dropped down to number 51 on the chart, selling 5,000 copies, bringing the total album sales to 42,000 copies.

== Track listing ==
Full Speed — Standard version
No.	Title	Writer(s)	Producer(s)	Length
1.	"What It Feels Like"	Brian Collins; Jonathan King; Julio Santiago	The Pioneer Crew	2:13
2.	"Faster"	Collins; Dacoury Natche; Linda Hargrove; Mark Ellerbee	DJ Dahi; J Grand^{[b]}	2:27
3.	"Dolo" (featuring R. Kelly)	Collins; Robert S. Kelly; Nicholas Balding; Mark Kragen	Nic Nac; Kragen	3:23
4.	"Body Language" (featuring Tinashe and Usher)	Collins; Usher Raymond; Tinashe Kachingwe; Mikkel Storleer Eriksen; Tor Erik Hermansen; Magnus August Høiberg	StarGate; Cashmere Cat	3:26
5.	"Hotel" (featuring Chris Brown)	Collins; Christopher M. Brown; Christopher Featherstone; Justin Featherstone; Matthew Featherstone; William Featherstone; Bobby Simmons, Jr.; Tyrone Griffin, Jr.; Dijon McFarlane; Clarence Montgomery III	The Featherstones; J Grand^{[b]}	3:38
6.	"Cool Back"	Collins; Christopher P. Washington	C.P Dubb; J Grand^{[b]}; J-Holt^{[b]}	3:02
7.	"Be Real" (featuring Dej Loaf)	Collins; Deja Trimble; McFarlane; Julian Gramma; Nicholas Audino; Lewis Hughes; Brittany Hazard; Daouda Leonard	DJ Mustard; J Gramm; Twice as Nice^{[b]}	3:26
8.	"Every City We Go" (featuring Migos)	Collins; Quavious Marshall; Kirshnik Ball; Kiari Cephus; Edward Cameron	Ned Cameron	3:52
9.	"Round Here"	Collins; Dwane Weir	Key Wane	3:05
10.	"About Mine" (featuring Trey Songz)	Collins; Tremaine Neverson; Leonard; McFarlane; Audino; Hughes; David Blake; Dajuan Walker	DJ Mustard; Twice as Nice^{[a]}	3:41
11.	"Blunted"	Collins; Ramon Owen	REO	3:42
12.	"Like a Hott Boyy" (featuring Young Thug and Bricc Baby Shitro)	Collins; Jeff Williams; Zihirr Mitchell; Leland Wayne; Gary Hill	Metro Boomin; DJ Spinz	4:15
Total length:				40:08

Deluxe edition (bonus tracks)
No.	Title	Writer(s)	Producer(s)	Length
13.	"Show Must Go On" (featuring Machine Gun Kelly and Math Allen)	Collins; Colton Baker; Matthew Strother; Lu Diaz; Dwayne Chin-Quee; Benjamin Diehl; Terrence Rolle	Lu Diaz; Supa Dups; Ben Billions	3:26
14.	"Diamonds & Gold" (featuring Verse Simmonds)	Collins; David Doman; Maurice Simmonds	Simmonds; D.A. Doman	3:24
15.	"POV"	Peter Wade Keusch; Josh Werner	Wade; Werner	3:45
Total length:				50:42

Japanese deluxe edition (bonus tracks) - Streaming edition bonus track
No.	Title	Writer(s)	Producer(s)	Length
16.	"Let Em Know" (featuring Vee Tha Rula)	Collins; Christian Dior Dane; Doman	D.A. Doman	2:40

Notes

- ^{^[a]} signifies a co-producer
- ^{^[b]} signifies an additional producer
- "Faster" contains a portion of the composition "A Face That Doesn't Matter", written by Linda Hargrove and Mark Ellerbee.
- "Hotel" contains a portion of the composition "Paranoid", written by Bobby Simmons, Jr., Tyrone Griffin, Jr., Dijon McFarlane and Clarence Montgomery III.
- "About Mine" contains a portion of the composition "Why U Bullshittin'", written by David Blake and Dejuan Walker.

== Charts ==
=== Weekly charts ===
Chart (2015)	Peak position
Australian Albums (ARIA)	15
Austrian Albums (Ö3 Austria)	12
Belgian Albums (Ultratop Flanders)	119
Belgian Albums (Ultratop Wallonia)	116
Canadian Albums (Billboard)	12
Dutch Albums (Album Top 100)	72
French Albums (SNEP)	42
German Albums (Offizielle Top 100)	10
New Zealand Albums (RMNZ)	24
Scottish Albums (OCC)	14
Swiss Albums (Schweizer Hitparade)	7
UK Albums (OCC)	10
UK R&B Albums (OCC)	1
US Billboard 200	14
US Top R&B/Hip-Hop Albums (Billboard)	1

=== Year-end charts ===
Chart (2015)	Position
US Billboard 200	188
US Top R&B/Hip-Hop Albums (Billboard)	68

== Certifications ==
Region	Certification	Certified units/sales
New Zealand (RMNZ)	Gold	7,500^{‡}
United Kingdom (BPI)	Silver	60,000^{‡}
United States (RIAA)	Gold	500,000^{‡}
^{‡} Sales+streaming figures based on certification alone.

== Release history ==
Country	Date	Format	Label	Ref.
Germany	January 30, 2015	CD; digital download	RCA Records	
Ireland	January 30, 2015	CD; digital download	RCA Records	
Netherlands	January 30, 2015	CD; digital download	RCA Records	
France	February 2, 2015	CD; digital download	RCA Records	
United Kingdom	February 2, 2015	CD; digital download	RCA Records	
Italy	February 3, 2015	CD; digital download	RCA Records	
United States	February 3, 2015	CD; digital download	RCA Records	
Australia	February 6, 2015	CD; digital download	RCA Records	
