= Body Language (Kid Ink song) =

Single by Kid Ink featuring Usher and Tinashe

from the album Full Speed
- Released: September 9, 2014
- Recorded: 2014
- Genre: Hip hop; R&B
- Length: 3:28
- Label: Tha Alumni Music Group; 88 Classic; RCA
- Songwriters: Brian Collins; Ryon Lovett; Tinashe Kachingwe; Magnus Høiberg; Mikkel S. Eriksen; Tor Erik Hermansen
- Producers: Cashmere Cat; Stargate

Kid Ink singles chronology
"Delirious (Boneless)" (2014)	"Body Language" (2014)	"Hotel" (2015)

Usher singles chronology
"She Came to Give It to You" (2014)	"Body Language" (2014)	"I Don't Mind" (2014)

Tinashe singles chronology
"Pretend" (2014)	"Body Language" (2014)	"Drop That Kitty" (2015)

Music video
- "Body Language" on YouTube

"Body Language" is a song by American rapper Kid Ink. The song was released on September 9, 2014 by Tha Alumni Music Group, 88 Classic and RCA Records, as the lead single from his third studio album Full Speed (2015).

The song, produced by Cashmere Cat and melody created by Stargate, features a guest appearances from RCA Records label cohorts, singers Usher and Tinashe.

== Music video ==
The accompanying music video for the track was directed by Darren Craig and filmed in Atlanta, Georgia. It was released on October 27, 2014.

== Charts ==
Chart (2014–2015)	Peak position
Belgium (Ultratip Bubbling Under Flanders)	28
Belgium Urban (Ultratop Flanders)	16
Belgium (Ultratip Bubbling Under Wallonia)	12
France (SNEP)	104
Germany (GfK)	54
Netherlands (Single Top 100)	107
Scottish Singles Sales (Official Charts)	45
UK Singles (Official Charts)	46
US Billboard Hot 100	72
US Hot R&B/Hip-Hop Songs (Billboard)	21
US R&B/Hip-Hop Airplay (Billboard)	26
US Rhythmic Airplay (Billboard)	6

== Certifications ==
Region	Certification	Certified units/sales
Australia (ARIA)	Gold	35,000^{‡}
Canada (Music Canada)	Gold	40,000^{‡}
New Zealand (RMNZ)	Platinum	30,000^{‡}
United Kingdom (BPI)	Silver	200,000^{‡}
United States (RIAA)	Platinum	1,000,000^{‡}
^{‡} Sales+streaming figures based on certification alone.
