= Pineapple (Ty Dolla Sign song) =

Single by Ty Dolla Sign featuring Gucci Mane and Quavo

from the album Beach House 3
- Released: March 30, 2018
- Length: 3:21
- Label: Atlantic
- Songwriters: Tyrone Griffin, Jr.; Radric Davis; Quavious Marshall; Alex Petit; Christian Ward
- Producers: CashMoneyAP; Hitmaka

Ty Dolla Sign singles chronology
"Me So Bad" (2018)	"Pineapple" (2018)	"OTW" (2018)

Gucci Mane singles chronology
"Cool" (2018)	"Pineapple" (2018)	"Kept Back" (2018)

Quavo singles chronology
"Savior" (2018)	"Pineapple" (2018)	"Cupido" (2018)

Music video
- "Pineapple" on YouTube

"Pineapple" is a song by American singer Ty Dolla $ign featuring American rappers Gucci Mane and Quavo. It was released on March 30, 2018 as a single (fourth and final overall) from the deluxe of Ty's second studio album Beach House 3 (2017).

== Release and composition ==
Ty Dolla Sign previewed "Pineapple" at a concert in North Carolina March 27, 2018.

== Commercial performance ==
"Pineapple" peaked at number 18 on the Billboard Bubbling Under Hot 100, with no official impact date set for radio. On January 31, 2019, the single was certified gold by the Recording Industry Association of America (RIAA) for sales of over 500,000 digital copies in the United States.

== Music video ==
The official music video was released June 20, 2018 and features a dancing Pineapple surrounded by each performer and scantily dressed women.

== Charts ==
=== Weekly charts ===
Chart (2018)	Peak position
Canada (Canadian Hot 100)	91
US Bubbling Under Hot 100 (Billboard)	18
US Bubbling Under R&B/Hip-Hop Singles (Billboard)	4

== Certifications ==
Region	Certification	Certified units/sales
United States (RIAA)	Gold	500,000^{‡}
^{‡} Sales+streaming figures based on certification alone.
