= Furious 7 (soundtrack) =

2015 motion picture soundtrack

Furious 7: Original Motion Picture Soundtrack

Soundtrack album by Various artists
- Released: March 17, 2015
- Genres: Hip hop; EDM; Latin pop
- Length: 60:05
- Label: Atlantic
- Producers: DJ Spinz; Lookas; Lil' C; DJ Frank E; Mike Caren; Lucas Rigo; Andrew Cedar; Charlie Puth; Sangsik "A-Dee" Shin

Singles from Furious 7: Original Motion Picture Soundtrack
- 1. "Ride Out" Released: February 17, 2015; 2. "How Bad Do You Want It (Oh Yeah)" Released: February 23, 2015; 3. "See You Again" Released: March 10, 2015

Furious 7: Original Motion Picture Soundtrack is the soundtrack to Furious 7. It was released on March 17, 2015, by Atlantic Records. The film had three initial promotional singles released from the soundtrack. The first was "Ride Out", performed by Kid Ink, Tyga, Wale, YG and Rich Homie Quan. "Ride Out" also had a music video alongside its release, and the second single was "Go Hard or Go Home", performed by Wiz Khalifa and Iggy Azalea. Both singles were released on February 17, 2015. "Off-Set", performed by T.I. and Young Thug was the final promotional single for the film, and had a music video accompanied its release.

A music video for Wiz Khalifa ft. Charlie Puth's "See You Again" as the final tribute to film series main protagonist Brian O'Conner's actor Paul Walker, who died in a car crash in November 2013. The music video consisted of compiled archive footage from the duration of the film series in special memory of Walker. "See You Again" was a huge international success, reaching number one in fourteen countries, including the US, ending Mark Ronson's "Uptown Funk" fourteen-week reign at the top of the chart. The song received a nomination for Best Original Song at the 73rd Golden Globe Awards.

== Commercial performance ==
In the United States, the album debuted at number 12 on the chart, dipped 5 spots to 17, before gaining traction and moving up 15 positions marks the largest jump into the top 2 of the chart, since Les Misérables, which moved 31 positions (33–2) in the week ending January 22, 2013. The album peaked at number one on the US Billboard 200 albums chart for one week in its fourth week, in the week ending April 12, 2015, earning 111,000 album-equivalent units (58,000 copies of traditional album sales). It was buoyed by the popularity and increase in sales of its single, "See You Again" (which also went number one on the US Billboard Hot 100, with 464,000 sales the same week), which allowed the album to edge over Future Hearts by All Time Low's 75,000 traditional album sales.

As of May 2015, the album has sold 145,000 copies, making it the second best-selling The Fast and Furious soundtrack, behind The Fast and the Furious: Tokyo Drift (235,000 copies) and ahead of Fast Five (94,000 copies), Fast & Furious 6 (80,000 copies) and Fast & Furious (69,000 copies). The album also reached number 2 on the UK Compilation Chart (held off by Now 90).

== Critical reception ==
Writing for Rolling Stone, and rating the album three and a half-out-of-five stars, Nick Murray states: "Pop music and cars have a long history, but the Furious 7 soundtrack goes one step further, seeking out 16 tracks thrilling enough for the biggest chase movie of the decade. The resulting LP doesn't just move between hip-hop, EDM and Latin pop—it shows all three genres trading ideas. Environmentalists, rejoice: This one is plenty of fun even if no one's burning gas."

== Track listing ==
Standard Edition
No.	Title	Writer(s)	Artist(s)	Length
1.	"Ride Out" (Kid Ink, Tyga, Wale, YG and Rich Homie Quan)	Olubowale Akintimehin; Brian Todd Collins; Keenon Jackson; Dequantes Lamar; Paris Jones; Michael Ray Nguyen-Stevenson; Jamie Sanderson	Sermstyle	3:31
2.	"Off-Set" (T.I. and Young Thug)	Cordale Quinn; Clifford Harris Jr.; Jeffrey Williams; Edward Page II	Lil' C; 6 Mile JP	3:13
3.	"How Bad Do You Want It (Oh Yeah)" (Sevyn Streeter)	James "JHart" Abrahart; Chloe Angelides; Andrew Cedar; Justin Franks; James Smith; Amber Streeter; Klejdi Llupa; Theodore Economou	DJ Frank E; Cedar	3:44
4.	"Get Low" (Dillon Francis and DJ Snake)	Dillon Francis; Steve Guess; William Grigahcine	Francis; DJ Snake	3:33
5.	"Go Hard or Go Home" (Wiz Khalifa and Iggy Azalea)	William Featherstone; Justin Featherstone; Christopher Featherstone; Matthew Featherstone; Paulo Rodriguez; Dominic W. Woods; Breyan Stanley Isaac; Cameron Thomaz; Amethyst Kelly	The Featherstones	3:52
6.	"My Angel" (Prince Royce)	Franks; Cedar; Sangsik Shin; Edwin "Lil Eddie" Serano; Geoffrey Rojas	DJ Frank E; Cedar; A-Dee; Lil Eddie^{[a]}	3:10
7.	"See You Again" (Wiz Khalifa featuring Charlie Puth)	Franks; Cedar; Thomaz; Charles Puth	DJ Frank E; Charlie Puth; Cedar	3:49
8.	"Payback" (Juicy J, Kevin Gates, Future and Sage the Gemini)	Alex Schwartz; Joe Khajadourian; Geoffrey Patrick Earley; Woods; Kevin Gilyard; Jordan Houston; Nayvadius Wilburn; Gilbere Forte	The Futuristics; Geoffro Cause^{[b]}	3:58
9.	"Blast Off" (David Guetta and Kaz James)	Michael Anthony; Ebow Graham; David Guetta; Kaz James; Pavan Mukhi; David Lee Roth; Giorgio Tuinfort; Alex Van Halen; Edward Van Halen; Ralph Wegner	Guetta; James	3:08
10.	"Six Days (Remix)" (DJ Shadow featuring Mos Def)	Josh Davis; Brian Farrell	DJ Shadow	3:52
11.	"Ay Vamos (Remix)" (J Balvin featuring French Montana and Nicky Jam)	José Osorio; Rene Cano; Carlos Patiño; Alejandro Ramirez	Sky Bull; Nene; Mosty	4:55
12.	"GDFR (Noodles Remix)" (Flo Rida featuring Sage the Gemini and Lookas)	Woods; Franks; Cedar; Mike Caren; Rodriguez; Tramar Dillard; Sylvester Allen; Harold Ray Brown; Morris Dickerson; Lonnie Jordan; Charles William Miller; Lee Oskar; Howard E. Scott	DJ Frank E; Cedar; Lookas^{[c]}; Miles Beard^{[c]}	4:23
13.	"Turn Down for What" (DJ Snake and Lil Jon)	Bresso; Grigahcine; Jonathan Smith	DJ Snake and Lil Jon	3:34
14.	"Meneo" (Fito Blanko)	Armando C. Pérez; Jorge Martinez Gomez; José García; Keith Kanashiro; Roberto Testa; Robert Fernandez		3:44
15.	"I Will Return" (Skylar Grey)	Holly Hafermann; J.R. Rotem; Luke Laird	J.R. Rotem; Jayson DeZuzio	3:56
16.	"Whip (Bonus Track)" (does not appear in film) (Famous to Most)	Pervis Maurice Reynolds Jr.; De'Andre Johnson; Jalen Ware; Hasani Buchanan; Brandon Whitfield	The Real Hasani; BWheezy	3:41

Deluxe edition
No.	Title	Artist(s)	Length
17.	"Go Hard Or Go Home, Pt. 2"	Wiz Khalifa, Trey Songz, French Montana, and Ty Dolla Sign	4:15
18.	"Boneless (Delirious)"	Steve Aoki, Chris Lake, and Tujamo featuring Kid Ink	3:43
19.	"Francoise"	soFLY & Nius	1:53
20.	"Holler"	Gent & Jawns	4:24
21.	"Hamdulillah"	Narcy featuring Shadia Mansour	5:17
22.	"Tempest"	Deftones	6:05
23.	"Universal Pictures Fanfare"	Jerry Goldsmith and Brian Tyler	0:23

Notes

- ^{^[a]} signifies a vocal producer
- ^{^[b]} signifies an additional producer
- ^{^[c]} signifies a co-producer

Sample credits

- "How Bad Do You Want It (Oh Yeah)" contains a sample of "Utopia", performed by Bang La Decks, written by Klejdi Llupa and Theodore Economou.
- "Blast Off" contains a sample of "Ain't Talkin' 'bout Love", performed and written by Van Halen.
- "Six Days (Remix)" contains a sample of "Six Day War", performed by Colonel Bagshot and written by Brian Farrell.
- "GDFR (Noodles Remix)" contains a sample of "Low Rider", performed and written by War.

== Charts ==
=== Weekly charts ===
Chart (2015)	Peak position
Australian Albums (ARIA)	3
Austrian Albums (Ö3 Austria)	3
Belgian Albums (Ultratop Flanders)	7
Belgian Albums (Ultratop Wallonia)	19
Canadian Albums (Billboard)	2
Danish Albums (Hitlisten)	10
Dutch Albums (Album Top 100)	39
Finnish Albums (Suomen virallinen lista)	43
French Albums (SNEP)	55
German Albums (Offizielle Top 100)	2
Hungarian Albums (MAHASZ)	10
Italian Compilation Albums (FIMI)	2
Japanese Albums (Oricon)	2
New Zealand Albums (RMNZ)	7
Norwegian Albums (VG-lista)	4
Spanish Albums (Promusicae)	29
Swiss Albums (Schweizer Hitparade)	1
UK Compilation Albums (Official Charts)	2
US Billboard 200	1
US Top R&B/Hip-Hop Albums (Billboard)	1
US Soundtrack Albums (Billboard)	1
US Indie Store Album Sales (Billboard)	2

=== Year-end charts ===
Chart (2015)	Position
Australian Albums (ARIA)	26
Belgian Albums (Ultratop Flanders)	83
Belgian Albums (Ultratop Wallonia)	150
Canadian Albums (Billboard)	27
French Albums (SNEP)	163
German Albums (Offizielle Top 100)	55
Italian Compilation Albums (FIMI)	28
Japanese Albums (Billboard Japan)	13
New Zealand Albums (RMNZ)	49
Swiss Albums (Schweizer Hitparade)	19
US Billboard 200	19
US Top R&B/Hip-Hop Albums (Billboard)	15
US Top Rap Albums (Billboard)	12
US Soundtrack Albums (Billboard)	8

=== Decade-end charts ===
Chart (2010–2019)	Position
US Billboard 200	187

== Certifications ==
Region	Certification	Certified units/sales
Australia (ARIA)	Gold	35,000^{^}
Denmark (IFPI Danmark)	Gold	10,000^{‡}
Hungary (MAHASZ)	Gold	1,000^{^}
Japan (RIAJ)	Gold	100,000^{^}
New Zealand (RMNZ)	2× Platinum	30,000^{‡}
United Kingdom (BPI)	Gold	100,000^{‡}
United States (RIAA)	Platinum	1,000,000^{‡}
^{^} Shipments figures based on certification alone.^{‡} Sales+streaming figures based on certification alone.

== Furious 7: Original Motion Picture Score ==
Furious 7: Original Motion Picture Score

Film score by Brian Tyler
- Released: March 31, 2015
- Genre: Film score
- Length: 76:42
- Label: Back Lot Music
- Producer: Brian Tyler

Brian Tyler chronology
All Hail the King (2014)	Furious 7: Original Motion Picture Score (2015)	Avengers: Age of Ultron (2015)

Furious 7: Original Motion Picture Score is the film score to the film of the same name. The score was composed by Brian Tyler. The album, with a total of 28 tracks, was released on CD and digital distribution by Back Lot Music on March 31, 2015 with 76 minutes and 42 seconds' worth of music.

=== Track listing ===
All music in the score is composed and conducted by Brian Tyler. Additional music is conducted by Arturo Rodriques.

No.	Title	Length
1.	"Furious 7"	2:57
2.	"Paratroopers"	3:11
3.	"Awakening"	3:21
4.	"Operation Ramsey"	2:12
5.	"Battle Of The Titans"	1:59
6.	"Parting Ways"	2:22
7.	"Mountain Hijack"	2:04
8.	"Homecoming"	2:05
9.	"Beast In A Cage"	3:06
10.	"Homefront"	3:02
11.	"Vow For Revenge"	2:24
12.	"Party Crashers"	5:44
13.	"The Three Towers"	3:14
14.	"God's Eye"	2:55
15.	"When Worlds Collide"	2:35
16.	"Remembrance"	1:40
17.	"Hobbs Is The Cavalry"	2:31
18.	"Operation Carjack"	3:47
19.	"A Completely Insane Plan"	3:47
20.	"Letty And Dom"	2:25
21.	"Heist In The Desert"	1:57
22.	"No More Funerals"	3:15
23.	"Hobbs VS Shaw"	3:21
24.	"Connected"	1:24
25.	"About To Get Real Serious Up In Here"	2:53
26.	"Family"	2:12
27.	"One Last Stand"	2:55
28.	"Farewell"	1:24
Total length:		1:16:42
