= Beach House 3 =

- Standard edition cover. Deluxe edition features a green color background

Studio album by Ty Dolla Sign
- Released: October 27, 2017
- Recorded: 2016–2017
- Studios: Germano (New York City); Glenwood Place; Wyman (Burbank); Record Plant (Los Angeles)
- Genres: R&B; hip-hop
- Length: 71:04
- Label: Atlantic
- Producers: 30 Roc; A1Jovan; The Audibles; BongoByTheWay; D'Mile; DJ Mustard; Dun Deal; Hey DJ; Hitmaka; Jake One; James Royo; Jeff Gitty; Johnny Stokes; Lee on the Beats; Mike Dean; Mike Will Made It; Peter Lee Johnson; Pharrell Williams; Pluss; Poo Bear; Prince Chrishan; Sam Wish; Skrillex; Sons of Sonix; Southside; Twice as Nice; Ty Dolla Sign

Ty Dolla Sign chronology
Campaign (2016)	Beach House 3 (2017)	MihTy (2018)

Singles from Beach House 3
- 1. "Love U Better" Released: July 10, 2017; 2. "So Am I" Released: September 1, 2017; 3. "Ex" Released: November 6, 2017; 4. "Pineapple" Released: March 30, 2018

Beach House 3 is the second studio album by American singer Ty Dolla Sign. It was released on October 27, 2017, by Atlantic Records. The album serves as the third installment in his Beach House series. It features guest appearances from Pharrell Williams, Lil Wayne, Tory Lanez, The-Dream, YG, Future, Swae Lee, Wiz Khalifa, Damian Marley, and Lauren Jauregui, among others. The album's production was handled by Mike Will Made It, DJ Mustard, Skrillex, Mike Dean, Apex Martin, MariiBeatz, Dun Deal and James Royo, among others.

Beach House 3 was supported by four official singles: "Love U Better", "So Am I", "Ex" and "Pineapple", the latter on the deluxe. The album received generally positive reviews from critics and debuted at number 11 on the US Billboard 200, earning 29,000 album-equivalent units in its first week. The album was certified gold by the Recording Industry Association of America (RIAA) in October 2020.

== Background ==
On June 19, 2016, Ty Dolla Sign confirmed that he was working on Beach House 3 via Instagram. The album's pre-order was announced on September 20, 2017, along with the cover art. The tracklist was revealed on October 23, 2017.

On May 8, 2018, Ty Dolla Sign announced on Twitter that the deluxe edition of Beach House 3 will be released shortly, along with six new tracks.

== Promotion ==
The album's lead single, "Love U Better" featuring Lil Wayne and The-Dream, was released July 10, 2017. The album's second single, "So Am I" featuring Damian Marley and Skrillex, was released on September 1, 2017. "Message in a Bottle" and "Dawsin's Breek" featuring Jeremih, were released as the album's first two promotional singles on September 20, simultaneously. "Ex" featuring YG, was released on October 6, 2017, as the album's third promotional single. It was later sent to rhythmic radio as the album's third single (second and final single sent to radio). The album's fourth promotional single, "Don't Judge Me", was premiered by Ebro on Beats 1 and released on October 18, 2017.

"Pineapple" featuring Gucci Mane and Quavo, was released on March 30, 2018, as the album's fourth and final single (first from the deluxe edition). "Clout" featuring 21 Savage, was released on May 9, 2018, as the album's fifth promotional single.

== Critical reception ==
Professional ratings
Aggregate scores
Source	Rating
Metacritic	77/100
Review scores
Source	Rating
AllMusic	4/5 stars
The A.V. Club	B
HipHopDX	4.1/5
HotNewHipHop	83%
NME	3/5 stars
The Observer	2/5 stars
Pitchfork	7.8/10
Tiny Mix Tapes	4.5/5
Tom Hull – on the Web	B+
XXL	4/5

Beach House 3 was met with generally positive reviews. At Metacritic, which assigns a normalized rating out of 100 to reviews from professional publications, the album received an average score of 77, based on eight reviews.

Andy Kellman of AllMusic gave a positive review, stating "Peeling away the factors that obscure Griffin's talent—the vulgar hedonism, the cavalcade of predominantly superfluous guest artists—can take some effort. Beach House III is nonetheless conclusive evidence that the singer, rapper, songwriter, producer, and multi-instrumentalist is among the most skilled and creative figures in the business". Corrigan B of Tiny Mix Tapes said, "Beach House 3 is a strong, strong effort: universally pleasant in the same way as its antecedents, but given a thorough sonic update so as to keep pace with modernity". Riley Wallace of HipHopDX considered the album an improvement to Ty Dolla Sign's preceding project Campaign, stating Beach House 3 is "a great listen. Where Campaign (though dope) may have lacked some serious earworm moments, this album picks up the remaining tab — with change to spare. Even with nothing to truly prove, Ty Dolla $ign managed to once again assert dominance in an overcrowded lane of crooners who get likened to rappers". Scott Glaysher of XXL wrote positively, "Beach House 3 truly is Ty Dolla $ign's best work to date. He manages to please with his collaborative hits and hooks all while maintaining artistic integrity with his more introspective tracks".

Clayton Purdom of The A.V. Club said, "While 2015's Free TC felt designed to impress, a little too encyclopedic and earnest for its own good, Beach House 3 takes its concept literally, soundtracking a hypothetical bender in a paradise where the comedown never arrives". Paul A. Thompson of Pitchfork noted, "A superbly refined collection of songs, carefully crafted and smartly cast. It doesn't have the longer thematic crescendos of TC, but is even more ruthlessly listenable, stacking hooks on top of hooks and flitting between an array different, pop-viable aesthetic frameworks". In a mixed review, NME's Jordan Bassett stated: "Lyrically, Beach House 3 is a step away from the musician's satin-sheeted comfort zone, but we may have to wait for Beach House 4 to see him truly come of age." In a more mixed review, Ben Beaumont-Thomas of The Observer described the album as "a narrow, unimaginative collection".

=== Rankings ===
Select year-end rankings of Beach House 3
Publication	List	Rank	Ref.
Rap-Up	20 Best Albums of 2017	18	
Spin	50 Best Albums of 2017	34	

== Commercial performance ==
Beach House 3 debuted at number 11 on the US Billboard 200 chart, earning 29,000 album-equivalent units, (including 6,000 were pure album sales) in its first week. The album also debuted at number eight on the US Top R&B/Hip-Hop Albums chart, becoming his second top-ten debut on this chart. On October 19, 2020, the album was certified gold by the Recording Industry Association of America (RIAA) for combined sales and album-equivalent units of over 500,000 units in the United States.

== Track listing ==
Beach House 3 track listing
No.	Title	Writer(s)	Producer(s)	Length
1.	"Famous"	Tyrone Griffin, Jr.; Dominic Jordan; Jimmy Giannos; Jason Boyd; Sasha Sirota	The Audibles; Poo Bear; Sirota^{[a]}	3:20
2.	"Famous Lies"	Griffin, Jr.; Sonny Moore; Peter Lee Johnson; Peabo Bryson; Michael Dean; James Royo; Dernst Emile II	Royo; D'Mile; Mike Dean; Johnson; Skrillex; Ty Dolla Sign	0:59
3.	"Love U Better" (featuring Lil Wayne and The-Dream)	Griffin, Jr.; Dwayne Carter, Jr.; Terius Nash; Dijon McFarlane; Nick Audino; Lewis Hughes; Nashiem Myrick; Mary J. Blige; Kimberly Jones; Bryson; Carlos Broady; Xenos da Costa; LaTonya Blige da Costa	DJ Mustard; Twice as Nice	3:02
4.	"Ex" (featuring YG)	Griffin, Jr.; Keenon Jackson; Uforo Ebong; Christian Ward; Christopher Dotson; Floyd Bentley III; Quinnes Parker; Donell Jones; Daron Jones; Michael Keith; Kyle West; Marvin Scandrick; Sean Combs; Steven Jordan; DeWayne Rogers; Christopher Wallace	BongoByTheWay; Hitmaka; Ty Dolla Sign^{[a]}	2:43
5.	"Famous Excuses"	Griffin, Jr.; S. Moore; Dean; Royo; Emile II; Johnson	Skrillex; Dean; Royo; D'Mile; Johnson; Ty Dolla Sign	1:02
6.	"Droptop in the Rain" (featuring Tory Lanez)	Griffin, Jr.; Dotson; Bentley III; Daystar Peterson; Ward; Anthony Norris	Lee on the Beats; Hitmaka	3:00
7.	"Don't Judge Me" (featuring Future and Swae Lee)	Griffin, Jr.; Samuel Gloade; Noel Fisher; Nayvadius Wilburn; Michael Williams II; Khalif Brown; Jazzaé de Waal	Mike Will Made It; 30 Roc	4:02
8.	"Dawsin's Breek" (featuring Jeremih)	Griffin, Jr.; Dotson; Williams II; Jeremy Felton; Bentley III; Ward; Asheton Hogan	Mike Will Made It; Pluss	2:45
9.	"Don't Sleep on Me" (featuring Future and 24hrs)	Griffin, Jr.; Wilburn; Robert Davis; Joshua Luellen; Jacob Dutton; Samuel Wishkoski; Dean; Asten Harris; de Waal; Aaron Sherrod	Southside; Jake One; Sam Wish; Dean^{[b]}; Apex Martin^{[b]}	4:33
10.	"Stare" (featuring Pharrell Williams and Wiz Khalifa)	Griffin, Jr.; Glenda Proby; Pharrell Williams; Cameron Thomaz	P. Williams	4:49
11.	"Famous Friends"	Griffin, Jr.; Emile II	Royo; D'Mile; Dean; Johnson; Skrillex; Ty Dolla Sign	0:38
12.	"So Am I" (featuring Damian Marley and Skrillex)	Griffin, Jr.; Damian Marley; Boyd; S. Moore; Sirota	Skrillex; Poo Bear; Sirota^{[a]}; Habstrakt^{[b]}	3:45
13.	"Lil Favorite" (featuring MadeinTYO)	Griffin, Jr.; Stephanie McGraw; Malcolm Davis; Bentley III; Dotson; Ward	Prince Chrishan; Hitmaka; A1^{[a]}	3:13
14.	"In Your Phone" (with Lauren Jauregui)	Griffin, Jr.; Dotson; David Cunningham; Jamarii Massey; Lauren Jauregui	Dun Deal; MariiBeatz^{[a]}	2:30
15.	"All the Time"	Griffin, Jr.; Dotson; Ward; John James Stokes, Jr.; Melvin Moore; Bentley III; Lyrica Anderson	Johnny Stokes; A1Jovan; Prince Chrishan; Hitmaka; Ty Dolla Sign; A1^{[a]}	3:03
16.	"Famous Amy"	Griffin, Jr.	Royo; D'Mile; Dean; Johnson; Skrillex; Ty Dolla Sign	0:36
17.	"Side Effects"	Griffin, Jr.; Olaniyi Akinkunmi; Moses Samuels; Boyd	Sons of Sonix; Poo Bear	2:53
18.	"Famous Last Words"	Griffin, Jr.	Royo; D'Mile; Dean; Johnson; Skrillex; Ty Dolla Sign	0:34
19.	"Message in a Bottle"	Griffin, Jr.; Darhyl Camper, Jr.; Supreme Williams	Hey DJ	2:32
20.	"Nate Howard Intro"	Nate Howard	D'Mile	1:40
Total length:				51:39

Deluxe edition (bonus tracks)
No.	Title	Writer(s)	Producer(s)	Length
21.	"Pineapple" (featuring Gucci Mane and Quavo)	Griffin, Jr.; Ward; Alex Petit; Radric Davis; Quavious Marshall	CashMoneyAP; Hitmaka	3:38
22.	"Clout" (featuring 21 Savage)	Griffin, Jr.; Ward; Samuel Jimenez; Gabriel Tavarez; Shayaa Abraham-Joseph	Smash David; Rekless; Hitmaka	3:20
23.	"Number"	Griffin, Jr.; Ward; Steven Thornton; Geoffrey Earley	Swiff D; Geoffro Cause; Hitmaka	3:22
24.	"Drugs" (featuring Wiz Khalifa)	Griffin, Jr.; Ward; Jeremy Coleman; Dotson; Thomaz	JMIKE; Prince Chrishan; Hitmaka	2:23
25.	"South Beach" (featuring Quavo and French Montana)	Griffin, Jr.; Ward; Ernest Brown; Benjamin Saint Fort; Marshall; Karim Kharbouch	Charlie Heat; BNYX; Hitmaka	3:16
26.	"Simple" (featuring Yo Gotti)	Griffin, Jr.; Ward; Jimenez; Kevin Gomringer; Tim Gomringer	Smash David; Cubeatz; Hitmaka	3:26
Total length:				71:04

Notes

- ^{^[a]} signifies a co-producer
- ^{^[b]} signifies an additional producer
- "Famous" features uncredited vocals from John Mayer
- "Stare" features background vocals from ASAP Rocky

Sample credits

- "Famous Lies" contains a sample of "Feel the Fire", performed by Peabo Bryson.
- "Love U Better" contains samples of "I Can Love You", performed by Mary J. Blige; and "Feel the Fire", performed by Peabo Bryson.
- "Ex" contains a sample of "Only You", performed by 112 featuring The Notorious B.I.G.
- "All the Time" contains a sample of "The Champ", performed by The Mohawks.

== Personnel ==
Credits were adapted from Tidal.

Technical

- Andy Barnes – recording engineer (tracks 1–3, 5, 10–12, 14, 16–18, 19), additional mixing engineer (tracks 1, 2, 5, 10, 11, 14, 16, 18–20), additional recording (track 13)
- James Royo – mixing engineer (tracks 1, 2, 4, 5, 11, 16–20), recording engineer (tracks 3, 10, 17)
- Dave Kutch – mastering engineer (tracks 1, 2, 4–7, 9–11, 13–20)
- Todd Norman – engineer (tracks 1, 2, 4, 10, 11, 14, 16, 18, 20), assistant mixing engineer (tracks 5, 17, 19)
- Jo McLean – engineer (tracks 1, 12, 17)
- Matthew Sim – assistant engineer (tracks 1, 2, 4, 5, 10, 11, 16, 18–20)
- Manny Park – assistant engineer (tracks 1, 2, 4, 5, 10, 11, 16, 18–20)
- Alex Layne – engineer (tracks 2, 5, 11, 12, 16, 18)
- Jaycen Joshua – mixing engineer (tracks 3, 13, 15)
- David Nakaji – engineer (tracks 3, 13, 15)
- Ivan Jimenez – engineer (track 3)
- Andrew Grossman – engineer (tracks 3, 10, 19)
- Nathaniel Alford – additional recording (track 3)
- Sauce Miyagi – recording engineer (tracks 4, 13, 15)
- Jean-Marie Horvat – mastering engineer (track 4), additional mixing engineer (tracks 13, 15)
- Mike Larson – recording engineer (track 10)
- Thomas Cullison – engineer (track 10)
- Iain Findlay – engineer (track 10)
- Poo Bear – recording engineer (track 12)
- Skrillex – mastering engineer (track 12), mixing engineer (track 12)
- Ben Milchev – assistant engineer (tracks 13, 15)
- Morning Estrada – engineer (track 19)

== Charts ==
Chart performance for Beach House 3
Chart (2017)	Peak position
Australian Albums (ARIA)	37
Belgian Albums (Ultratop Flanders)	86
Belgian Albums (Ultratop Wallonia)	148
Canadian Albums (Billboard)	21
Dutch Albums (Album Top 100)	22
Finnish Albums (Suomen virallinen lista)	36
French Albums (SNEP)	69
German Albums (Offizielle Top 100)	87
New Zealand Albums (RMNZ)	17
Norwegian Albums (VG-lista)	9
Swedish Albums (Sverigetopplistan)	35
UK Albums (Official Charts)	53
UK R&B Albums (Official Charts)	20
US Billboard 200	11
US Top R&B/Hip-Hop Albums (Billboard)	8

== Certifications ==
Certifications for Beach House 3
Region	Certification	Certified units/sales
New Zealand (RMNZ)	Gold	7,500^{‡}
United States (RIAA)	Gold	500,000^{‡}
^{‡} Sales+streaming figures based on certification alone.

== Release history ==
Release dates and formats for Beach House 3
Region	Date	Label	Format(s)	Edition	Ref.
Various	October 27, 2017	Atlantic	CD; digital download; streaming	Standard	
Various	February 23, 2018	Atlantic	Vinyl	Standard	
Various	May 11, 2018	Atlantic	Digital download; streaming	Deluxe	
