= Hotel (Kid Ink song) =

Single by Kid Ink featuring Chris Brown

from the album Full Speed
- Released: January 27, 2015
- Recorded: 2014
- Genre: Hip hop; R&B
- Length: 3:39
- Label: Tha Alumni Music Group; 88 Classic; RCA
- Songwriter(s): Brian Collins; Chris Brown; Christopher Featherstone; Justin Featherstone; Matthew Featherstone; William Featherstone
- Producer(s): The Featherstones

Kid Ink singles chronology
"Body Language" (2014)	"Hotel" (2015)	"Ride Out" (2015)

Chris Brown singles chronology
"Ayo" (2015)	"Hotel" (2015)	"Don't Kill the Fun" (2015)

Music video
- "Hotel" on YouTube

"Hotel" is a song by American rapper Kid Ink. The song was released as an instant-grat on January 9, 2015 by Tha Alumni Music Group, 88 Classic and RCA Records, later becoming the second single from his third studio album Full Speed (2015). It was sent to US urban adult contemporary radio on January 27, 2015.

== Background ==
After the commercial success of their previous single "Show Me", Kid Ink linked up with American singer Chris Brown to work on a song with songwriting and production team The Featherstones. At first the song was displayed as "track 5" (while the rest of the tracks were titled) on the iTunes Store album pre-order before it was released commercially as a single.

== Music video ==
An animated music video was uploaded to Vevo on June 9, 2015.

== Charts ==
Chart (2015)	Peak position
Australia (ARIA)	60
Belgium (Ultratip Bubbling Under Flanders)	59
France (SNEP)	145
Germany (GfK)	30
Netherlands (Single Tip)	21
UK Singles (OCC)	43
UK Hip Hop/R&B (OCC)	4
US Billboard Hot 100	96
US Hot R&B/Hip-Hop Songs (Billboard)	30
US Rhythmic (Billboard)	12

== Certifications ==
Region	Certification	Certified units/sales
New Zealand (RMNZ)	Gold	15,000^{‡}
United Kingdom (BPI)	Silver	200,000^{‡}
United States (RIAA)	Gold	500,000^{‡}
^{‡} Sales+streaming figures based on certification alone.
