= Go Hard or Go Home (song) =

Promotional single by Wiz Khalifa and Iggy Azalea

from the album Furious 7: Original Motion Picture Soundtrack
- Released: February 17, 2015
- Genre: Hip hop; trap
- Length: 3:52
- Label: Atlantic
- Songwriters: Cameron Thomaz; Amethyst Kelly; The Featherstones
- Producer: The Featherstones

"Go Hard or Go Home" is a song by American rapper Wiz Khalifa and Australian rapper Iggy Azalea. It appears on the Furious 7: Original Motion Picture Soundtrack (2015) and was available as an instant track upon pre-ordering the album via iTunes stores on February 17, 2015. The song was produced by The Featherstones. A second version entitled "Go Hard or Go Home Part 2" featuring Khalifa, French Montana, Trey Songz and Ty Dolla Sign was included as a bonus track on the deluxe version of the soundtrack.

== Background and release ==
In February 2015, Atlantic Records announced Furious 7: Original Motion Picture Soundtrack, the musical companion to Universal's action film Furious 7, which would be released in stores and at all online retailers on March 17, and with the movie opening in theaters and IMAX on April 3, 2015. The soundtrack became available for pre-order on February 17 with select pre-orders receiving instant gratification downloads of the collection's first promotional singles, including Khalifa and Azalea's "Go Hard or Go Home." The track had its exclusive debut on Warner Music Group's "Snapchat Discover" service, Atlantic's first audio premiere via the photo messaging application Snapchat's new portal. After the premiere, Khalifa tweeted Azalea about an upcoming video shoot for the track. In 2014, it had also been revealed by The Fast and the Furious actor Vin Diesel that Azalea would be making a cameo appearance on the seventh installment of the film series.

== Commercial performance ==
"Go Hard or Go Home" debuted at number one hundred on the US Billboard Hot 100, becoming Khalifa's twenty-seventh charting title and Azalea's eighth, and at number thirty-seven on the Billboard Hot R&B/Hip-Hop Songs for the week ending February 22, 2015. Digital sales of the track fueled its arrival on the charts, logging 40,000 downloads in its first week out, landing a number twenty-seven bow on Billboard's Digital Songs. Buzz around the release of the song also launched it onto the weekly Billboard Twitter Top Tracks chart, where it entered at number ten. The track re-entered the Billboard Hot 100 dated April 25, 2015, at number eighty-six, with a fairly equal split of rising sales (27,000, up 39 percent) and streams (1.7 million, up 68 percent).

== Track listing ==
Digital download

1. "Go Hard or Go Home" [Album track] – 3:52

== Charts ==
=== Weekly charts ===
Chart (2015)	Peak position
Australia (ARIA)	60
Australian Urban (ARIA)	12
Austria (Ö3 Austria Top 40)	59
Belgium (Ultratip Bubbling Under Flanders)	65
Belgium Urban (Ultratop Flanders)	22
Canada Hot 100 (Billboard)	65
France (SNEP)	77
Germany (GfK)	47
Lebanon (Lebanese Top 20)	9
Sweden (Veckan Heatseeker)	14
Switzerland (Schweizer Hitparade)	55
UK Singles (Official Charts Company)	110
UK Hip Hop/R&B (Official Charts)	19
US Billboard Hot 100	86
US Hot R&B/Hip-Hop Songs (Billboard)	29
US Hot Rap Songs (Billboard)	21

=== Year-end charts ===
Chart (2015)	Position
Belgium Urban (Ultratop Flanders)	88

== Certifications ==
Region	Certification	Certified units/sales
United States (RIAA)	Gold	500,000^{‡}
^{‡} Sales+streaming figures based on certification alone.
