= Shoulda Been There, Pt. 1 =

EP by Sevyn Streeter
- Released: July 17, 2015
- Recorded: 2014–2015
- Genres: R&B, soul
- Length: 24:17
- Labels: Atlantic, CBE Entertainment

Sevyn Streeter chronology
| Call Me Crazy, But... (2013) | Shoulda Been There, Pt. 1 (2015) | Girl Disrupted (2017) |

Singles from Shoulda Been There, Pt. 1
- 1. "Don't Kill the Fun" Released: January 13, 2015; 2. "Shoulda Been There" Released: July 15, 2015

Shoulda Been There, Pt. 1 is the second extended play (EP) by American recording artist Sevyn Streeter. It was released on July 17, 2015 through Atlantic Records in collaboration with CBE. Collaborations feature Chris Brown, Hit-Boy and B.o.B. The extended play was preceded by two singles "Don't Kill the Fun" and "Shoulda Been There".

Shoulda Been There, Pt. 1 debuted at number 4 on the US R&B Albums chart and number 15 on the R&B/Hip-Hop Albums chart.

== Background and promotion ==
Following the success of Sevyn's debut extended play (EP) Call Me Crazy, But... Streeter released a teaser trailer for a new single, "Don't Kill the Fun" featuring Chris Brown, on January 8, 2015 and announced that the song would be released on January 13, 2015. On April 28, 2015 Streeter released a statement on her Instagram account about "4th Street" stating "I wrote [it] on a day I found out someone I loved broke my heart into a million pieces. . On July 13, 2015 "Shoulda Been There" featuring B.o.B would be the next single.

On October 3, 2015, it was announced that Streeter would embark on a 7-date tour starting on November 2 in Philadelphia, Pennsylvania and finishing on November 22 in Sacramento, California.

== Critical reception ==
The extended play was met with a positive response from critics. Rap-Up stated "While she readies her debut On the Verge, Sevyn Streeter holds fans over with her new project Shoulda Been There, Pt. 1. ."

== Singles ==
Don't Kill the Fun featuring Chris Brown was released as the first single on January 13, 2015. The music video was released to Streeter's YouTube channel on February 15, 2015 and directed by Chris Brown. The song charted on the Billboard Twitter Top Tracks chart at number forty-nine, number sixteen on the Hot R&B Songs chart and number nineteen on the R&B/Hip-Hop Airplay chart.

"Shoulda Been There" featuring B.o.B was released as the second single on July 15, 2015. A lyric video was released to Streeter's YouTube channel on July 13, 2015. The song failed to make impact in the United States.

=== Other songs ===
A music video for "Boomerang" featuring Hit-Boy was released to promote "Shoulda Been There, Pt. 1" on September 28, 2015.

Acoustic versions of "Love in Competition" and "Just Being Honest" were released to Streeter's YouTube channel on January 5, 2016 and February 23, 2016. The video for "Just Being Honest" was directed Rocko Muir.

== Tour ==
On October 3, 2015 a 7-date tour was announced to promote "Shoulda Been There, Pt. 1" called "Sevyn Streeter Live" starting November 2, 2015 and finishing on November 22, 2015. The tour would feature an intimate performance with discussions about relationships, love, life and everything that inspires her writing while playing songs from her previously released projects. Sevyn will partner up with Music Choice for the L.A. and San Francisco stops to present the “Music Choice Presents: Sound Check Sessions.

| Date | City | Country | Venue |
|---|---|---|---|
North America
| November 2, 2015 | Philadelphia | United States | The Foundry @ The Fillmore |
| November 4, 2015 | Baltimore | United States | Soundstage |
| November 5, 2015 | New York City | United States | SOB’s |
| November 8, 2015 | Washington, D.C. | United States | Howard Theater |
| November 18, 2015 | Los Angeles | United States | El Rey Theatre |
| November 21, 2015 | San Francisco | United States | Social Hall SF |
| November 22, 2015 | Sacramento | United States | Harlow’s |

== Commercial performance ==
In the United States, "Shoulda Been There, Pt. 1" debuted at number four on the Billboard R&B Albums chart on August 8, 2015. In its second week the extended play dropped to number seventeen on August 15, 2015. In its third week it dropped to number twenty-five on August 22, 2015 spending a total of three weeks on the chart. It also debuted at number fifteen on the R&B/Hip-Hop Albums chart spending one week on the chart.

== Track listing ==
Credits taken from Discogs website.

Shoulda Been There, Pt. 1
| No. | Title | Writer(s) | Producer(s) | Length |
|---|---|---|---|---|
| 1. | "Let's Talk About It" (Intro) | Amber Streeter | | 0:20 |
| 2. | "Don't Kill the Fun" (featuring Chris Brown) | Streeter, Cameron Wallace, Ashley Rose Collier | Cameron Wallace | 3:36 |
| 3. | "A Bad Situation" (Interlude) | Streeter | | 0:28 |
| 4. | "Consistent" | Streeter | Dem Jointz | 3:17 |
| 5. | "A Piece of Advice" (Interlude) | Streeter | | 0:58 |
| 6. | "Love in Competition" | Streeter, Andy Hill, Ernest Tuo Clark [Da Internz], James "J-Doe" Smith, Marcos "Kosine" Palacios [Da Internz] | Da Internz | 3:29 |
| 7. | "Infinite Chances" (Interlude) | Streeter | | 0:17 |
| 8. | "Boomerang" (featuring Hit-Boy) | Chauncey Hollis (Hit-Boy), Eric Bellinger, Patrick "J. Que" Smith, Streeter | Hit-Boy | 3:11 |
| 9. | "2 Years, 2 Late" (Interlude) | Streeter | | 0:20 |
| 10. | "Just Being Honest" | Streeter, Tiffany Fred, Mateo Laboriel, Mansur Zafr | Mansur Zafr | 4:05 |
| 11. | "Shoulda Been There" (Interlude) | Streeter | | 0:33 |
| 12. | "Shoulda Been There" (featuring B.o.B) | James "J-Doe" Smith, Brandon Alexander Hodge, Streeter, Micah Evan Powell, Gabrielle N. Nowee, Bobby Ray Simmons Jr, Justin Johnson | B.A.M. | 3:31 |
| 13. | "Do the Games Ever Stop, Pt. 1" (Outro) | Streeter | | 0:12 |
| Total length: | | | | 24:17 |

== Charts ==
| Chart (2015) | Peak position |
|---|---|
| US Top R&B/Hip-Hop Albums (Billboard) | 15 |

== Release history ==
| Region | Date | Format | Label | Ref |
|---|---|---|---|---|
| Worldwide | July 17, 2015 | Digital Download | Atlantic Records | |
