= Girl Disrupted =

Studio album by Sevyn Streeter
- Released: July 7, 2017
- Genres: R&B, soul
- Length: 52:54
- Label: Atlantic

Sevyn Streeter chronology
Shoulda Been There, Pt. 1 (2015)	Girl Disrupted (2017)	Drunken Wordz Sober Thoughtz (2021)

Singles from Girl Disrupted
- 1. "My Love for You" Released: September 16, 2016; 2. "Before I Do" Released: December 2, 2016; 3. "Fallen" Released: January 27, 2017

Girl Disrupted is the debut studio album by American recording artist Sevyn Streeter. The album was released on July 7, 2017, through Atlantic Records. The album was preceded by the release of three singles—"My Love for You", "Before I Do" and "Fallen".

The album charted at number ninety-two on the Billboard 200 and number forty-four on the Top R&B/Hip-Hop Albums chart.

== Background and promotion ==
On March 9, 2015, the album's title was announced as On the Verge via Streeter's Instagram account, "ON THE VERGE the moment before something great happens… you can feel it! This album is my "something great". My thoughts, desires, fears, tears, emotional ups, downs, good times, drunken nights and unforgettable memories all rolled up into on body of work." On November 29, 2016, Streeter announced a preliminary release date and the title for Girl Disrupted, scheduled to be January 27, 2017. The title is a reference and a nod to the 1999 psychological drama film Girl, Interrupted with, as Streeter says, "this crazy industry" as a stand-in for the bizarre cast of characters at the movie's mental hospital: "I love that movie and always watch it in bed. But one night, for some reason, the story connected to me in a different way. It was like, ‘God, that's me and this crazy music industry.’ I'm not interrupted — just ‘disrupted.’"

On January 19, 2017, in an interview with Hip Hop Weekly, she revealed the collaborations on the album: "I have a record with August Alsina called 'Been A Minute,' I have a record with Ty Dolla $ign called 'Fallen,' I have a record with Dave East, I got a record with Jeremih, and I got a couple of more surprises imma keep in my back pocket." On June 7, 2017, Streeter announced the release date of the album along with the artwork via her Instagram account. The following day the track listing was announced.

== Singles ==
"My Love for You" was released as the album's lead single on September 16, 2016, with the music video premiering three days later on September 19, 2016.

"Before I Do" was released as the album's second single on December 2, 2016. The music video was released on December 5, 2016. The song peaked at number fifteen on the Billboard R&B/Hip-Hop Airplay and number one on the Adult R&B Songs chart week beginning July 1, 2017.

"Fallen" featuring Ty Dolla $ign and Cam Wallace was released as the album's third single on January 27, 2017. The music video was released on January 30, 2017.

=== Original singles ===
"Prolly" featuring rapper Gucci Mane was released on August 12, 2016. The music video was released on August 15, 2016. The song entered the R&B/Hip-Hop Airplay chart at number fifty on October 8, 2016.

"D4L" featuring The-Dream was released on October 14, 2016. The music video was released on October 17, 2016. The remixes were released on January 13, 2017.

Neither of these singles appeared on the album. promotional cd's included them for performances.

== Tour ==
On November 15, 2016, the 18-date Sevyn Streeter Girl Disrupted Tour was announced to promote Girl Disrupted, which began on January 12, 2017, in St. Louis, Missouri and finished on February 12, 2017, at The Roxy in Los Angeles.

Date	City	Country	Venue
North America
January 12, 2017	St. Louis	United States	The Firebird
January 13, 2017	Chicago	United States	The Promontory
January 14, 2017	Detroit	United States	El Club
January 15, 2017	Cleveland	United States	Grog Shop
January 18, 2017	Baltimore	United States	Baltimore Soundstage
January 19, 2017	New York City	United States	B.B. Kings Blue Club & Grill
January 21, 2017	Philadelphia	United States	The Foundry
January 22, 2017	Washington, D.C.	United States	Howard Theatre
January 24, 2017	Atlanta	United States	The Loft
January 26, 2017	Dallas	United States	The Cambridge Room at House of Blues
January 28, 2017	Houston	United States	The Bronze Peacock at House of Blues Houston
January 29, 2017	New Orleans	United States	House of Blues: New Orleans
February 7, 2017	Santa Ana	United States	Constellation Room
February 8, 2017	San Diego	United States	Soda Bar
February 9, 2017	Oakland	United States	The New Parish
February 10, 2017	Santa Cruz	United States	Atrium
February 11, 2017	Sacramento	United States	Ace of Spades
February 12, 2017	Los Angeles	United States	The Roxy Theatre

== Commercial performance ==
The album debuted at number ninety-two on the Billboard 200 albums chart, number thirteen on the R&B Albums chart and number forty-four on the Top R&B/Hip-Hop Albums chart in its first week with 4,351 units sold.

== Track listing ==
Girl Disrupted
No.	Title	Writer(s)	Producer(s)	Length
1.	"Livin"	Amber Streeter; Caston Grigsby	Grigsby	4:17
2.	"Present Situation" (featuring The-Dream)	Christopher "Tricky" Stewart; Terius Nash	Tricky Stewart; The-Dream	4:00
3.	"My Love for You"	Streeter; Marquis Rachad; Chaz Jackson; Orlando Williamson; Damon Thomas; Dashawn "Happie" White	Squat Beats; Mr. Williams	4:43
4.	"Anything You Want" (featuring Ty Dolla $ign, Jeremih and Wiz Khalifa)	Streeter; Tyrone Griffin, Jr.; Jeremy Felton; Cameron Thomaz; Christian Ward; Teddy Peña	Hitmaka; RetroFuture	3:34
5.	"Ol Skool" (featuring DeJ Loaf and Jeremih)	Streeter; Deja Trimble; Felton; Uforo Ebong; Raymond Komba	Bongo; Ray Keys	5:11
6.	"Soon as I Get Home"	Streeter; Goldiie; Ward; Faith Evans; Sean Combs	Hitmaka & Da Internz	3:02
7.	"Before I Do"	Streeter; Felisha King; Micah Powell; Jonathan Yip; Ray Romulus; Jeremy Reeves; Ray Charles McCullough II; Isley Brothers; Chris Jasper	The Stereotypes; Micah Powell; Bernard Harvey	3:57
8.	"Been a Minute" (featuring August Alsina)	Streeter; August Alsina; James "J-Doe" Smith; Brandon Douglas; Shondrae Crawford	Mr. Bangladesh	3:49
9.	"Translation"	Streeter; Brian "Killah B" Bates	Killah B	3:53
10.	"Peace Sign" (featuring Dave East)	Streeter; Dewain Whitmore Jr.; Eric Bellinger; David Brewster; Crawford	Mr. Bangladesh; Carlos Cahee; Bernard Harvey	4:33
11.	"Fallen" (featuring Ty Dolla $ign and Cam Wallace)	Streeter; Griffin, Jr.; Cameron Wallace; James Harris; Terry Lewis; Daryl Simmons; Kenneth Edmonds	Cam Wallace	4:32
12.	"How Many"	Streeter; Chris Jones; Julius Rivera III; Michael Williams; Morris Jones; Garrett	Squat Beats; Mr. Williams; Sean Garrett	3:39
13.	"Everything in Me"	Bianca Atterberry; Jevon Hill; Streeter; Stanley Green Jr.	The Co-Captains	3:44

== Charts ==
Chart (2017)	Peak position
US Billboard 200	92
US Top R&B/Hip-Hop Albums (Billboard)	44

== Release history ==
Country	Date	Format	Label	Ref.
United States	July 7, 2017	Digital download	Atlantic	
United Kingdom	July 7, 2017	Digital download	Atlantic	
