= How Bad Do You Want It (Oh Yeah) =

Single by Sevyn Streeter

from the album Furious 7: Original Motion Picture Soundtrack
- Released: February 23, 2015
- Recorded: 2014
- Genre: EDM
- Length: 3:44
- Label: Atlantic
- Songwriters: J. Hart; DJ Frank E; Chloe Angelides; Andrew Cedar
- Producers: DJ Frank E; Cedar

Sevyn Streeter singles chronology
"Don't Kill the Fun" (2015)	"How Bad Do You Want It" (2015)	"4th Street" (2015)

Music video
- "How Bad Do You Want It" on YouTube

"How Bad Do You Want It (Oh Yeah)" is a song by American singer Sevyn Streeter. It was released on February 23, 2015, as the second single from the soundtrack for Furious 7. The song samples the Aero Chord's Festival Trap Remix of Ultra Music's duo Bang La Decks' 2013 single "Utopia".

== Music video ==
The lyric video for "How Bad Do You Want It (Oh Yeah)" was released on Streeter's official YouTube channel on February 23, 2015. The official music video was released on May 4, 2015 on the channel. The music video was shot in Abu Dhabi, United Arab Emirates.

== Charts ==
Chart (2015)	Peak position
Australia (ARIA)	91
Switzerland (Schweizer Hitparade)	65
