= It Won't Stop =

Single by Sevyn Streeter

from the album Call Me Crazy, But...
- Released: May 22, 2013
- Recorded: 2013
- Genre: R&B
- Length: 4:18 (solo version); 4:41 (featuring Chris Brown)
- Label: Atlantic
- Songwriters: Amber Streeter; Jean Kouame; Chris Brown; M. Henry; M. Picard
- Producers: Diplo; Free School; Picard Brothers

Sevyn Streeter singles chronology
"I Like It" (2012)	"It Won't Stop" (2013)	"Next" (2014)

Remix featuring Chris Brown cover

Chris Brown singles chronology
"Beat It" (2013)	"It Won't Stop" (2013)	"Don't Think They Know" (2013)

"It Won't Stop" is a song recorded by American singer Sevyn Streeter. It was released on May 22, 2013, as the second single from her debut extended play (EP) Call Me Crazy, But..., by Atlantic Records. The song later received a remix featuring Chris Brown, had well-received reviews from critics, and achieved a platinum certification from Recording Industry Association of America.

== Reception ==
According to the Vibe magazine, the single "dominated the Mainstream R&B/Hip-Hop Airplay category for nine weeks straight" upon its release.

NPR has described the song as having "sunk into our collective consciousness through commercial radio play and a music video viewed more than 35 million times [as of 2014] and on the recommendation of a growing group of critics and fans", with lyrics that are "vernacular, warm, and unpretentious".

== Background and composition ==
The song was premiered on May 22, 2013. On June 24, 2013, Streeter released an acoustic performance video for the single. "It Won't Stop" is described as a contemporary R&B song.

Streeter released the remix to the song on August 28, 2013. It features Chris Brown. Streeter released an extended play of a collection of remixes featuring Brown on February 18, 2014.

== Music video ==
On October 10, 2013, Streeter uploaded the music video for the remix on her YouTube account. The video for the remix also premiered on BET's 106 & Park and was directed by Brown who also appears in the video along with NBA player Dorell Wright, playing Sevyn's love interest.

== Track listing ==
Digital download
No.	Title	Length
1.	"It Won't Stop"	4:18

Digital download
No.	Title	Length
1.	"It Won't Stop" (featuring Chris Brown)	4:41

It Won't Stop (Remixes) – EP
No.	Title	Length
1.	"It Won't Stop" (featuring Chris Brown) (Dwyr Radio Edit)	2:59
2.	"It Won't Stop" (featuring Chris Brown) (Freeschool Remix)	5:06
3.	"It Won't Stop" (featuring Chris Brown) (Michael Keenan Radio Edit)	3:28
4.	"It Won't Stop" (featuring Chris Brown) (ClickNPress Remix)	4:54
5.	"It Won't Stop" (featuring Chris Brown) (Mozaix Festival Radio Edit)	3:36
6.	"It Won't Stop" (featuring Chris Brown) (Cahill Radio Edit)	4:05

== Charts ==
=== Weekly charts ===
Chart (2013–2014)	Peak position
US Billboard Hot 100	30
US Adult R&B Songs (Billboard)	23
US Hot R&B/Hip-Hop Songs (Billboard)	9
US R&B/Hip-Hop Airplay (Billboard)	2
US Rhythmic Airplay (Billboard)	14

=== Year-end charts ===
Chart (2013)	Position
US Hot R&B/Hip-Hop Songs (Billboard)	90
Chart (2014)	Position
US Hot R&B/Hip-Hop Songs (Billboard)	41

== Certifications and sales ==
Region	Certification	Certified units/sales
New Zealand (RMNZ)	2× Platinum	60,000^{‡}
United Kingdom (BPI)	Silver	200,000^{‡}
United States (RIAA)	Platinum	1,000,000^{‡}
^{‡} Sales+streaming figures based on certification alone.

== Release history ==
Region	Date	Format	Version	Label	Ref
United States	May 22, 2013	urban adult contemporary radio	Original Version	Atlantic Records	
United States	October 10, 2013	urban adult contemporary radio	With Chris Brown	Atlantic Records	
United Kingdom	October 10, 2013	urban adult contemporary radio	With Chris Brown	Atlantic Records	
France	October 10, 2013	urban adult contemporary radio	With Chris Brown	Atlantic Records	
United States	February 18, 2014	urban adult contemporary radio	The Remixes – EP	Atlantic Records	
