= Next (Sevyn Streeter song) =

Single by Sevyn Streeter featuring Kid Ink or YG

from the album Call Me Crazy, But...
- Released: March 25, 2014
- Genre: R&B
- Length: 4:11 (Album version); 4:24 (with Kid Ink); 4:13 (with YG)
- Label: Atlantic
- Songwriter(s): Amber Streeter; J.J. Doe Smith; Dernst Emile II
- Producer(s): D'Mile

Sevyn Streeter singles chronology
"It Won't Stop" (2013)	"Next" (2014)	"Don't Kill the Fun" (2015)

Kid Ink singles chronology
"Main Chick" (2014)	"Next" (2014)	"Delirious (Boneless)" (2014)

Remix Cover featuring YG

YG singles chronology
"Who Do You Love?" (2014)	"Next" (2014)	"Do It to Ya" (2014)

"Next" (Stylized as nEXt) is a song recorded by American singer Sevyn Streeter taken as the second single from her debut extended play (EP) Call Me Crazy, But..., by Atlantic Records. Two remix versions were released on March 25, 2014, featuring American rapper Kid Ink and May 19, 2014, featuring American rapper YG.

== Background ==
Following the release of It Won't Stop (2013) it was announced that "nEXt" would be released as the third single from the debut EP Call Me Crazy, But... (2013) after a teaser trailer was released on Streeter's YouTube channel on November 6, 2013. The music video for the remix version featuring Kid Ink was announced to premiere on BET's 106 & Park on March 26, 2014. On May 16, 2014, a new remix version of "nEXt" was announced and released onto Streeter's YouTube channel.

== Chart performance ==
On April 12, 2014, the song reached its peak at number thirty-nine on the Hot R&B/Hip-Hop Songs chart. The song debuted at number nineteen on the Hot R&B Songs chart. In its second week the song dropped one place to number twenty. In its third week the song peaked back to number nineteen. On May 3, 2014, the song reached its peak at number eighteen on the Hot R&B Songs chart in its fourth week before falling to number twenty in its fifth week. On May 17, 2014, the song reached its peak at number twenty-three on the R&B/Hip-Hop Airplay chart in its tenth week.

== Music videos ==
On November 6, 2013, a teaser trailer was released on Streeter's YouTube channel but never surfaced and the original video was scrapped. On March 12, 2014, an audio video for the remix version featuring Kid Ink was released on Streeter's YouTube channel following a fifteen-second teaser trailer video on March 24, 2014. The music video premiered on BET's 106 & Park and Streeter's YouTube channel on March 26, 2014, directed by Derek Blanks.

On May 16, 2016, a new remix version of "nEXt" was released to Streeter's YouTube channel, with the music video released on May 20, 2014, also directed by Derek Blanks.

== Track listing ==
Digital download
No.	Title	Length
1.	"nEXt"	4:11

Remix with Kid Ink
No.	Title	Length
1.	"nEXt" (featuring Kid Ink)	4:25

Remix with YG
No.	Title	Length
1.	"nEXt" (featuring YG)	4:13

== Charts ==
Chart (2014)	Peak position
US Bubbling Under Hot 100 (Billboard)	23
US Hot R&B/Hip Hop Songs (Billboard)	39
US Hot R&B Songs (Billboard)	18
US R&B/Hip-Hop Airplay (Billboard)	23
