= Fallen (Sevyn Streeter song) =

Single by Sevyn Streeter featuring Ty Dolla $ign and Cam Wallace

from the album Girl Disrupted
- Released: January 27, 2017
- Recorded: 2016
- Genre: R&B
- Length: 4:32
- Label: Atlantic
- Songwriters: Streeter; Griffin, Jr.; Cameron Wallace; James Harris; Terry Lewis; Daryl Simmons; Kenneth Edmonds

Sevyn Streeter singles chronology
"Before I Do" (2016)	"Fallen" (2017)

Ty Dolla Sign singles chronology
"Blessings" (2017)	"Fallen" (2017)	"So Good" (2017)

Cam Wallace singles chronology
"Ringin'" (2016)	"Fallen" (2017)

"Fallen" is a song recorded by American R&B singer Sevyn Streeter featuring Ty Dolla $ign and Cam Wallace from her debut studio album, Girl Disrupted (2017). The song was released as the third single on January 27, 2017 through Atlantic Records. The song samples "If It Isn't Love" by New Edition.

== Reception ==
Devon Jefferson from Hot New Hip Hop reviewed the song "Sevyn Streeter's fingers have been pressed to the grindstone as of late. Additionally, the artist vowed to share a new song each month in anticipation of the album and today she honors that promise with her new moody single featuring Ty Dolla $ign and Cam Wallace titled "Fallen." The three singers harmonize with each other beautifully as they take us on a sultry journey and detail the gripping reality of falling for that special someone.

Singersroom stated in their review of the song "Like her previous offerings, “Fallen” is relationship-driven, seductive, and raw. “If you keep on putting it down, you gon’ make me love you / If you keep on putting it down, you gon’ make me stay,” she sings.

== Music video ==
The music video was released to YouTube on January 30, 2017.

== Track listings and formats ==
Explicit digital download
No.	Title	Length
1.	"Fallen" (featuring Ty Dolla $ign & Cam Wallace)	4:33

Clean digital download
No.	Title	Length
1.	"Fallen" (featuring Ty Dolla $ign & Cam Wallace)	4:32

== Release history ==
Region	Date	Format	Version	Label	Ref
Worldwide	January 27, 2017	Digital download	Clean; Explicit	Atlantic Records	
