= Prolly =

Single by Sevyn Streeter featuring Gucci Mane

from the album Girl Disrupted
- Released: August 12, 2016
- Recorded: 2016
- Genre: R&B
- Length: 3:51
- Label: Atlantic
- Songwriters: Radric Davis, Lindsay Gilbert, Charlie Heat, Abiodun Oyewole, Micah Powell, James Edward Smith III, Sevyn Streeter
- Producer: Charlie Heat

Sevyn Streeter singles chronology
"Shoulda Been There" (2015)	"Prolly" (2016)	"My Love for You" (2016)

Gucci Mane singles chronology
"Pick Up the Pieces" (2016)	"Prolly" (2016)	"Black Beatles" (2016)

"Prolly" is a song recorded by American R&B singer Sevyn Streeter and American rapper Gucci Mane. The song was released as the lead single for Girl Disrupted on August 12, 2016 through Atlantic Records.

== Music video ==
The audio video for "Prolly" was released to Streeter's YouTube channel on August 12, 2016. The music video was released to YouTube on August 15, 2016.

== Track listings and formats ==
Explicit digital download
No.	Title	Length
1.	"Prolly" (featuring Gucci Mane)	4:23

== Commercial performance ==
The song entered the R&B/Hip-Hop Airplay chart at number fifty on October 8, 2016.

== Charts ==
Chart (2016)	Peak position
US R&B/Hip-Hop Airplay (Billboard)	50

== Release history ==
Region	Date	Format	Label	Ref
Worldwide	August 12, 2016	Digital download	Atlantic Records	
