= Ex (Ty Dolla Sign song) =

2017 single by Ty Dolla Sign

Single by Ty Dolla Sign featuring YG

from the album Beach House 3
- Released: October 6, 2017
- Genre: R&B; hip hop
- Length: 2:43
- Label: Atlantic
- Songwriters: Tyrone Griffin, Jr.; Keenon Jackson; Uforo Ebong; Christian Ward; Christopher Dotson; Floyd Bentley III; Quinnes Parker; Donell Jones; Daron Jones; Michael Keith; Kyle West; Marvin Scandrick; Sean Combs; Steven Jordan; DeWayne Rogers; Christopher Wallace
- Producers: BongoByTheWay; Hitmaka; Ty Dolla Sign

Ty Dolla Sign singles chronology
"Off of It" (2017)	"Ex" (2017)	"Say Less" (2017)

YG singles chronology
"Young Niggaz" (2017)	"Ex" (2017)	"We Ain't Homies" (2017)

Music video
- "Ex" on YouTube

"Ex" is a song by American singer Ty Dolla Sign, released on October 6, 2017. It is the third single from his second studio album Beach House 3 (2017) and features American rapper YG. Produced by BongoByTheWay, Hitmaka and Ty Dolla Sign, the song samples the remix of "Only You" by 112.

== Composition and lyrics ==
The song is about the artists' disloyalty and their exes. It opens with Ty Dolla Sign referencing "Where I Wanna Be" by Donell Jones in the chorus: "I just text my main chick (main) / I told her I ain't coming home (home) / I just text my main chick (main) / I told her I ain't coming home, tonight (home)". He "gets to the heart of his plan" in the first verse, singing, "Mixing Henny with the Bombay (Bomb') / Fuck it, I done had a long day (oh) / I done linked up with my old thing / Right time, but the wrong place". YG then raps about his single life, on jet skis with "naked" women ("Leave your main squeeze for these naked bitches, yeah / That's how, you know, when it's all bad / She call me, I text her I could call back / But she imagine in her head I'm doing all that").

== Critical reception ==
Kevin Goddard of HotNewHipHop wrote that Ty Dolla Sign "delivers a radio-friendly club banger that finds him addressing relationship issues with his 'ex' girl." Vice Media called the song a "breezy piece of libidinous R&B that mostly involves Ty Dolla $ign mixing drinks and thinking about hooking back up with a former lover".

== Music video ==
The music video was released on January 18, 2018. Directed by David Camarena, it finds Ty Dolla Sign cruising through a city in a vintage car with hydraulics, then entering a party surrounded by many women, before he is seen in a room bathed in red lights with a woman wearing lingerie waits for him. Ty later meets up with YG, as they show off old-school cars and go partying.

== Charts ==
Chart (2017)	Peak position
US Bubbling Under R&B/Hip-Hop Singles (Billboard)	8

== Certifications ==
Region	Certification	Certified units/sales
United States (RIAA)	Gold	500,000^{‡}
^{‡} Sales+streaming figures based on certification alone.
