= The Featherstones =

American hip hop group

- Origin: Baltimore, Maryland, U.S.
- Genres: Electro hop; pop; R&B
- Instruments: Cubase; (multi: piano, guitar, bass guitar, drums, etc)
- Years active: 1997–present
- Labels: Artist Publishing Group, Warner Chappell
- Members: Christopher Featherstone; Justin Featherstone; Matthew Featherstone; William Featherstone
- Website: thefeatherstonesinc.com

The Featherstones are a record production and songwriting team from Baltimore, Maryland consisted of Justin, Christopher, William, and Matthew Featherstone.

== History ==
In 1997, the Featherstones created their production company with their father Lurenda Featherstone and began working with local artists Mystory and the singing group Everidae. While performing in a talent show hosted by The Baltimore Times at Security Square Mall, The Featherstones had the opportunity of meeting Sisqo of the singing group Dru Hill. It was there where he first heard them sing an original song written and produced by the Featherstones. He was so impressed that it led to the Featherstones first full production credit in 2002. "I Should Be..." both written and produced by the Featherstones was the lead single performed by American singing group Dru Hill from their third album Dru World Order. The single "I Should Be..." went on to reach number 25 on the Billboard Hot 100.

The Featherstones collaborated with Kevin Gates in 2013 on his album Stranger Than Fiction. They were contacted by their publisher to produce the track "Smiling Faces," which was designed to highlight Gates' versatility. Following the success of this track, the Featherstones and Gates continued their professional relationship on subsequent projects.

== Production discography ==
List of songs as producer or co-producer with year released, performed artists, and album name
Song	Year	Artist(s)	Album
"I Should Be..."	2002	Dru Hill	Dru World Order
"Rock-A-Bye"	2005	Black Buddafly	—N/a
"Bad Girl"	2006	Black Buddafly, Fabolous	Waist Deep Soundtrack
"Sheets-N-Pillows"	2007	Black Buddafly	—N/a
"On My Mind" (The Featherstones remix)	2011	Cody Simpson, New Boyz	100% Hits- The Best Of 2011 Summer Edition
"Make Believe"	2012	Groove Stu	Artofficial Substance
"Where I wanna Be"	2012	Groove Stu	Artofficial Substance
"F**k Em We Ball"	2012	B.o.B, Spodee	F**k Em We Ball
"A1"	2013	Spenzo	In Spenzo We Trust
"Smiling Faces"	2013	Kevin Gates	Stranger Than Fiction
"Never Goin' Back"	2014	Kid Ink	The Draft Picks 2014
"Make It Home"	2014	August Alsina, Jeezy	Testimony
"Right Now"	2014	August Alsina, 2 Chainz	DJ Drama presents: XXL's 2014's Freshmen Class
"Touchin, Lovin"	2014	Trey Songz, Nicki Minaj	Trigga
"Dead Wrong"	2014	Trey Songz, Ty Dolla $ign	Trigga
"Ain't My Fault"	2014	Yesi Ortiz, Yung Berg, Verse Simmonds	N/A
"Honestly"	2014	Diggy Simmons	N/A
"Word Around Town"	2014	Kevin Gates, Rich Homie Quan	Luca Brasi 2
"Hotel"	2015	Kid Ink, Chris Brown	Full Speed
"Psycho"	2015	Rozzi Crane	Space
"Go Hard or Go Home"	2015	Wiz Khalifa, Iggy Azalea	Furious 7
"Yet"	2015	Kehlani	You Should Be Here
"Do U Dirty"	2017	Kehlani	SweetSexySavage
