= D4L (song) =

Single by Sevyn Streeter featuring The-Dream
- Released: October 14, 2016
- Recorded: 2016
- Genre: Pop; R&B
- Length: 4:23
- Label: Atlantic
- Songwriter: The-Dream * Tricky Stewart
- Producer: The-Dream

Sevyn Streeter singles chronology
"My Love for You" (2016)	"D4L" (2016)	"Before I Do" (2016)

The-Dream singles chronology
"F U Pay Me" (2016)	"D4L" (2016)	"Love U Better" (2017)

Remix

"D4L" (an acronym for Down 4 Life) is a song recorded by American singer Sevyn Streeter featuring singer and producer The-Dream. The song was released as the third single on October 14, 2016, through Atlantic Records.

== Critical reception ==
The song was met with mixed reviews received by critics. HotNewHipHop said in a review "Sevyn Streeter continues to roll out new music in support of her forthcoming album Girl Disrupted, which is expected to arrive early next year. After hitting us with “Prolly” with Gucci Mane & “All My Love (My Love For You)” recently, Sevyn decides to keep it moving by dropping off another leak for us today called “D4L” featuring singer/songwriter The Dream." That Grape Juice described the song as a "racy track finds Sevyn in familiar territory – the bedroom. Tuck into the pulsating production after the jump… ‘D4L’ fuses the right dose of breeze and banger to make for a track that can be played in the club and in the car – top down."

== Music video ==
The audio video for "D4L" was released to Streeter's YouTube channel on October 13, 2016. The music video was released to YouTube on October 16, 2016.

== Track listings and formats ==
Explicit digital download
No.	Title	Length
1.	"D4L" (featuring The-Dream)	4:23

The Remixes
No.	Title	Length
1.	"D4L" (featuring The-Dream) (Guy Furious Remix)	2:53
2.	"D4L" (featuring The-Dream) (WtD DancePunk Remix)	3:48
3.	"D4L" (featuring The-Dream) (WatchTheDuck Remix)	3:16

== Release history ==
Region	Date	Format	Version	Label	Ref
Worldwide	October 14, 2016	Digital download	Original	Atlantic Records	
Worldwide	January 13, 2017	Digital download	Remixes EP	Atlantic Records	
