= Sevyn Streeter =

American R&B singer

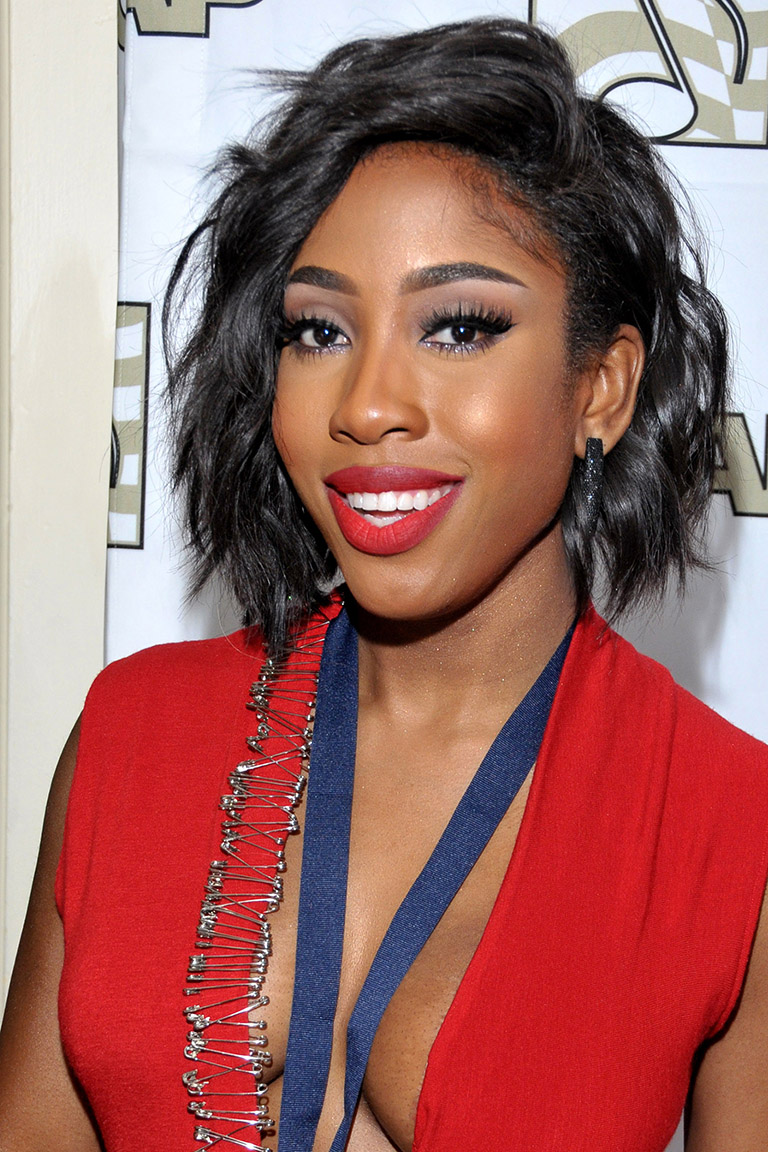
- Streeter in 2015

Background information
- Also known as: Se7en
- Born: Amber Denise Streeter; July 7, 1986 (age 40); Haines City, Florida, U.S.
- Genres: R&B; pop; soul
- Occupations: Singer; songwriter
- Years active: 2001–present
- Labels: CBE; Interscope; Atlantic; Jive; A&M; TUG; GroundWerk; eOne
- Website: sevynstreeter.com

Amber Denise "Sevyn" Streeter (born July 7, 1986) is an American singer and songwriter, best known for being a member of the girl groups TG4 and RichGirl where she was known as Se7en. She signed to Atlantic Records and released her debut single "I Like It" in 2012.

Her debut extended play Call Me Crazy, But... was released on December 3, 2013. It sold over 17,000 copies within its first week and spawning her first top 40 hit single "It Won't Stop", and "Next". The single achieved gold certification from RIAA marking it as her biggest selling single to date. In 2015, her first extended play (EP) Shoulda Been There, Pt. 1 was released. The extended play was preceded by two singles "Don't Kill the Fun" and "Shoulda Been There".

Her debut studio album Girl Disrupted was released on July 7, 2017. The album has been preceded by the release of five singles "Prolly", "My Love for You", "D4L", "Before I Do" and "Fallen". She has written songs for artists such as Chris Brown, K. Michelle, Usher, Kelly Rowland, Ariana Grande, Trey Songz, Alicia Keys, Fantasia, Brandy, and Tamar Braxton.

== Early life ==
Streeter was born on July 7, 1986, in Haines City, Florida, to Tim and Karen Streeter. She grew up singing in church and talent shows; by the time she was 5, Streeter already knew she wanted to sing for a living. At the age of 10, she competed on Showtime at the Apollo and tied for first place by singing "My Funny Valentine".

== Career ==
=== 2001–2012: TG4 and RichGirl ===
Streeter received her first record deal at the age of 14 years, performing in the girl group TG4, which was put together by Chris Stokes and T.U.G. Entertainment, where Stokes served as their manager. He offered Sevyn Streeter the first spot in the T.U.G./A&M group after she opened for B2K and IMx at a concert in Orlando, Florida in early 2001. Davida, Ashley, and Keisha fell in line after a series of successful auditions. The name TG4 is short for Tom Girls 4. "We're like four Tom Girls," said Amber, who tied for first place on Showtime at the Apollo when she was 10. "'When you're a girl and you act like a boy, you're a tomboy. We're girls and we act like guys but love being girls, so we're tom girls." The group opened for B2K, IMx and Bow Wow for their Scream II Tour, presented an award at the 9th Annual Soul Train Lady of Soul Awards at the Pasadena Civic Center in Pasadena, California on August 23, 2003, and performed on Soul Train.

The group's only major single was "Virginity", which peaked at number 88 on the US Billboard R&B chart in 2002. Their second single from the album was "2 Minutes", which a music video was filmed for. It failed to chart on Billboard Hot 100. The group also appeared on the track, "Sexy Boy" on the B2K album Santa Hooked Me Up. The group parted ways with their original label and their album, Time for the New, was shelved indefinitely. After Davida Williams departed from the group to focus on her acting career, they renamed the group "Tomgirls 4 Eva" and they were signed to Soul Chemistry. Shortly thereafter, the group disbanded.

Amber was later discovered by Rich Harrison on MySpace, and signed onto the RichCraft label as Se7en. Amber "Se7en" Streeter signed a deal with Jive Records and the RichCraft label in 2007 as a member of Rich Harrison's girl group, RichGirl. The girls released their mixtape on Valentine's Day 2011 Fall in Love with RichGirl. The group later disbanded after all members of the group pursued solo careers and different endeavors. The group opened for Beyoncé for her concert tour I Am... World Tour and toured with Mario before disbanding. On March 21, 2012, Streeter released a song titled "Red Handed" along with a statement that confirmed her disbandment from the group and revealed that she had signed with Chris Brown's CBE imprint.

=== 2013–2015: Call Me Crazy, But... and Shoulda Been There ===
Following the release of Chris Brown's Fortune (2012), Se7en has been featured on the album as Sevyn (removing the number "7", and adding a "v" and "y" instead). Se7en changed her stage name to Sevyn Streeter. On October 30, 2012, she released her debut single "I Like It", and premiered the music video for the song on BET's 106 & Park on January 4, 2013, in Los Angeles, California, and on May 22, 2013, she released her second single "It Won't Stop". On June 24, 2013, Streeter released an acoustic performance video for her second single "It Won't Stop". Her debut album entitled Call Me Crazy, But..., was released on February 16, 2013. The album debuted on the Billboard Top R&B/Hip-Hop Albums chart at No. 5 with 17,000 copies sold, according to Nielsen SoundScan. The album also preceded the release of the second single "Call Me Crazy" on April 8, 2013, along with a third single "Sex on the Ceiling" on August 5, 2013. On August 28, 2013, Streeter released the remix to her second single "It Won't Stop" featuring Chris Brown. The music video for the remix premiered on BET's 106 & Park on October 10, 2013, and was directed by Chris Brown himself and he also appears in the video along with NBA player Dorell Wright as Sevyn's love interest. On November 19, 2013, Streeter released the fourth single "nEXt". A remix for the single featuring American rapper Kid Ink. The music video premiered a day later on March 26, 2014. Later, on May 19, 2014, she released another remix for "nEXt", featuring rapper YG. The music video premiered on May 20, 2014.

In 2015, Streeter released the first promotional single called "Don't Kill the Fun" featuring Chris Brown from her upcoming second album. Also, Streeter recorded a song for the Furious 7: Original Motion Picture Soundtrack called "How Bad Do You Want It (Oh Yeah)". The soundtrack album was released on March 17, 2015. The song samples the Aero Chord's Festival Trap Remix of Ultra Music's duo Bang La Decks' 2013 single "Utopia". On April 28, 2015, Sevyn Streeter released the original first single from her second album titled "4th Street". The music video was released simultaneously with the single.

In July 2015, Streeter released the first of two planned EPs ahead of On the Verge, titled Shoulda Been There, Pt. 1. The set features "Don't Kill the Fun" as well as the title track, featuring B.o.B.

=== 2016–2018: Girl Disrupted ===
On August 12, 2016, Streeter released the original lead single from her second album Girl Disrupted, "Prolly" featuring Gucci Mane, with the music video premiering on August 14, and her debut album is scheduled to be released in early 2017. On September 16, 2016, Streeter released the official lead (originally second) single from her upcoming second album "Girl Disrupted", "My Love for You, with the music video premiering on September 19, 2016 directed by Mike Ho. On October 14, 2016, Streeter released the original third single from her second album "Girl Disrupted", "D4L" featuring The-Dream, with the music video premiering on October 17.

On October 26, 2016, Streeter was scheduled to perform the National Anthem at the start of the Philadelphia 76ers season opener but the 76ers organization did not approve of her shirt, which read, "We Matter." This came just one day after the NBA unveiled its "Together" campaign, promoting unity in the wake of the recent National Anthem protests sparked by San Francisco 49ers quarterback Colin Kaepernick. On November 15, 2016, an 18-date tour was announced to promote "Girl Disrupted" starting on January 12, 2017, in St. Louis, Missouri and finishing on February 12, 2017, at The Roxy in Los Angeles. On November 29, 2016, Streeter announced the release date for her upcoming album Girl Disrupted. The date of release was scheduled to be January 27, 2017.

On December 2, 2016, Before I Do was released as the album's fourth single, with the music video released on December 5, 2016. On January 19, 2017, in an interview with Hip Hop Weekly when asked about the album's release date Streeter responded with "It comes out in the spring. Everyone is saying Atlantic, no Sevyn is doing what Sevyn is doing. Anyone that follows my music knows how much work I put into my albums and my music. I want to put out more music and create more awareness, so I made the decision to push it [back] myself. Streeter also continues to reveal collaborations "I have a record with August Alsina called "Been A Minute," I have a record with Ty Dolla $ign called "Fallen," I have a record with Dave East, I got a record with Jeremih, and I got a couple of more surprises imma keep in my back pocket."

On January 27, 2017, "Fallen" featuring Ty Dolla $ign and Cam Wallace was released as the album's fifth single, with the music video premiering on January 30, 2017.

On July 7, 2017, Streeter released her first studio album, "Girl Disrupted".

On September 21, 2018, Streeter released her new single, "Yernin".

On November 8, 2019, Streeter released another single, "Whatchusay".

=== 2020–present: Drunken Wordz Sober Thoughtz ===
On September 18, 2020, Streeter released her first official single "HMU" and October 2, 2020, Streeter released her second single "Kissez" featuring Davido, which both singles were scraped from her upcoming sophomore album "Drunken Wordz Sober Thoughts". Streeter then released her official lead single "Guilty" featuring Chris Brown & A$ap Ferg on February 12, 2021.

In 2025, Streeter appeared on the Netflix music docu-reality series Hitmakers.

On July 6, 2026, she performed in an Aaliyah tribute, curated by Missy Elliott, for the finale at that year's Essence Festival of Culture.

== Influences ==
Sevyn Streeter cites Aaliyah as her biggest musical influence. Streeter covered Aaliyah's "Come Over" after visiting her high school, Detroit High School for the Fine and Performing Arts in Detroit, Michigan in May 2013. She also wrote a letter to honor her memory. Other influences include Janet Jackson, Michael Jackson, Kelly Rowland, Yolanda Adams, Whitney Houston, Celine Dion, Mariah Carey, Earth, Wind & Fire, Toni Braxton, Brandy Norwood, and Beyoncé.

== Discography ==
- Girl Disrupted (2017)
- Drunken Wordz Sober Thoughtz (2021)

== Awards and nominations ==
Year	Association	Category	Nominated	Result
2014	Soul Train Awards	Best New Artist	Sevyn Streeter	Nominated
