= My Love for You (Sevyn Streeter song) =

Single by Sevyn Streeter

from the album Girl Disrupted
- Released: September 16, 2016
- Recorded: 2016
- Genre: R&B
- Length: 4:43
- Label: Atlantic
- Songwriters: Amber Streeter, Marquis Rachad
- Producers: Tha Aristocrats , Damon Thomas,

Sevyn Streeter singles chronology
"Prolly" (2016)	"My Love for You" (2016)	"D4L" (2016)

"My Love for You" is a song recorded by American R&B singer Sevyn Streeter from her debut studio album, Girl Disrupted (2017). The song was released as the album's second single on September 16, 2016 through Atlantic Records. The song samples "Saving All My Love for You" by Whitney Houston.

== Critical reception ==
The song was met with positive reviews received by critics. HotNewHipHop said in a review "After scoring a huge Gucci Mane feature last month on "Prolly," Florida songstress Sevyn Streeter give us a more soulful angle of herself with the immediately enjoyable "My Love For You." If you wouldn't mind having your ears gently massaged by some nimble melodies, be sure to give "My Love For You" a listen."

== Music video ==
The audio video was released to Streeter's YouTube channel on September 15, 2016. On September 19, 2016 the music video was released to YouTube directed by Mike Ho.

=== Reception ===
This is RnB stated in a review of the video "Captivating the camera with some sexy dance routines choreographed by Fatima Robinson and rolling around on the hood of a classic Impala, Sevyn lets her prospective suitor know that her love is well-worth the wait, and she’s ready to give it up."

== Track listings and formats ==
Explicit digital download

1. "My Love for You" – 4:44

== Release history ==
Region	Date	Format	Label	Ref
Worldwide	September 16, 2016	Digital download	Atlantic Records	
