= Call Me Crazy, But... =

EP by Sevyn Streeter
- Released: December 3, 2013
- Genres: R&B, soul
- Length: 28:08
- Label: Atlantic
- Producers: Da Internz, Diplo

Sevyn Streeter chronology
| Fall in Love with RichGirl (2011) | Call Me Crazy, But... (2013) | Shoulda Been There, Pt. 1 (2015) |

Singles from Call Me Crazy, But...
- 1. "It Won't Stop" Released: May 22, 2013; 2. "Next" Released: March 25, 2014

Call Me Crazy, But... is the debut extended play (EP) by American recording artist Sevyn Streeter. It was released on December 3, 2013 through Atlantic Records in collaboration with CBE. The writing, recording and producing of the EP began as Streeter began working on her debut album as a solo artist. The whole EP has Streeter as a writer herself and features production from Da Internz and Diplo with Chris Brown being the only feature.

== Background and development ==
Following the release of Chris Brown's Fortune (2012), Se7en has been featured on the album as Sevyn (removing the number "7", and adding a "v" and "y" instead). Se7en changed her stage name to Sevyn Streeter. On October 30, 2012, she released her debut single "I Like It", and premiered the music video for the song on BET's 106 & Park on January 4, 2013 in Los Angeles, California, and on May 22, 2013, she released her second single "It Won't Stop". On June 24, 2013, Streeter released an acoustic performance video for "It Won't Stop". On August 28, 2013, Streeter released the remix to "It Won't Stop" featuring Chris Brown. The music video for the remix premiered on BET's 106 & Park on October 10, 2013 and was directed by Chris Brown himself and he also appears in the video along with NBA player Dorell Wright as Sevyn's love interest. Sevyn's debut EP entitled Call Me Crazy, But..., was released on December 3, 2013. The EP debuted on Billboard's Top R&B/Hip-Hop Albums chart at No. 5 with 17,000 copies sold, according to Nielsen SoundScan.

== Promotion ==
Music video's for "Sex on the Ceiling" and "B.A.N.S." was released on May 20, 2014 and June 25, 2014.

== Singles ==
"It Won't Stop" was released as the first single on May 22, 2013. On September 10, 2013, a remix version featuring Chris Brown was released and the music video released on October 10, 2013. The song charted at number thirty on the Billboard Hot 100 and achieved gold status from Recording Industry Association of America.

A remix version of "nEXt" featuring Kid Ink was released as the second single on March 25, 2014. The music video premiered on BET's 106 & Park and Streeter's YouTube channel on March 26, 2014, directed by Derek Blanks. A second remix version of the single featuring YG was released May 19, 2014, with the music video released on May 20, 2014 also directed by Derek Blanks.

== Track listing ==
| No. | Title | Writer(s) | Producer(s) | Length |
|---|---|---|---|---|
| 1. | "Come on Over" | Dernst "D'mile" Emile II, James "J-Doe" Smith, Amber Streeter | Dernst "D'mile" Emile II | 3:24 |
| 2. | "It Won't Stop" (featuring Chris Brown) | Clément Picard, Jean-Baptiste, Maxime Picard, Micah Powell, Michael McHenry, Ryan Buendia (DJ Replay), Amber Streeter | Picard Brothers, Diplo, Free School | 4:41 |
| 3. | "Sex On the Ceiling" | Eric Bellinger, Kevin Randolph, Kosine [Da Internz], Amber Streeter, Tuo Clark [Da Internz] | Da Internz | 4:22 |
| 4. | "Call Me Crazy" | Amber Streeter, Taylor Parks, Dwayne "Dem Jointz" Abernathy | Dem Jointz, Taylor Parks* | 3:40 |
| 5. | "B.A.N.S." | Eric Bellinger, Kevin Randolph, Kosine [Da Internz], Amber Streeter, Tuo Clark [Da Internz] | Da Internz | 4:16 |
| 6. | "Shattered" | Cameron Wallace, Amber Streeter, Ursula Yancy | Cameron Wallace | 3:35 |
| 7. | "nEXt" | Dernst "D'mile" Emile II, James "J-Doe" Smith, Amber Streeter | Dernst "D'mile" Emile II | 4:11 |
| Total length: | | | | 28:08 |

- ^[a] Indicates a co-producer

== Credits and personnel ==
Credits for Call Me Crazy, But... adapted from Allmusic.

- Sevyn Streeter – Primary Artist
- Amber Streeter (Sevyn Streeter) – Composer, Executive Producer
- Chris Brown – Executive Producer, Featured Artist
- Britney Davis – Executive Producer
- Tina Davis – Executive Producer
- Da Internz – Producer
- Free School – Producer
- Picard Brothers – Producer
- Diplo – Producer
- Dem Jointz – Engineer, Producer
- Dernst "D'mile" Emile II – Composer, Producer
- Taylor Parks – Composer, Producer
- Marcos Palacios – Composer, Engineer
- Cameron Wallace – Composer, Producer
- Jean-Baptiste – Composer
- Michael McHenry – Composer
- Maxime Picard – Composer
- James "J-Doe" Smith – Composer
- Kevin Randolph – Composer
- Yaasiel "Success" Davis – A&R
- Lanre Gaba – A&R
- Darrale Jones – A&R
- Kawan "KP" Prather – A&R
- John "J-Banga" Kercy – Engineer
- Romeo Taylor – Engineer
- Chris Tucker – Engineer
- Beau Vallis – Mixing Engineer
- Chris Gehringer – Mastering
- Jaycen Joshua – Mixing
- Ryan Kaul – Assistant
- Kevin Randolph – Keyboards
- Phillip "Logann" Scott III – Guitar, Soloist
- Steve Erle – Photography
- Courtney Walter – Art Direction, Design

== Charts ==
=== Weekly charts ===
| Chart (2013) | Peak position |
|---|---|
| US Billboard 200 | 30 |
| US Top R&B/Hip-Hop Albums (Billboard) | 5 |

=== Year-end charts ===
| Chart (2014) | Position |
|---|---|
| US Top R&B/Hip-Hop Albums (Billboard) | 48 |

== Certifications ==
Certifications for Call Me Crazy, But...
| Region | Certification | Certified units/sales |
|---|---|---|
| New Zealand (RMNZ) | Gold | 7,500^{‡} |
^{‡} Sales+streaming figures based on certification alone.
