= Kid Ink discography =

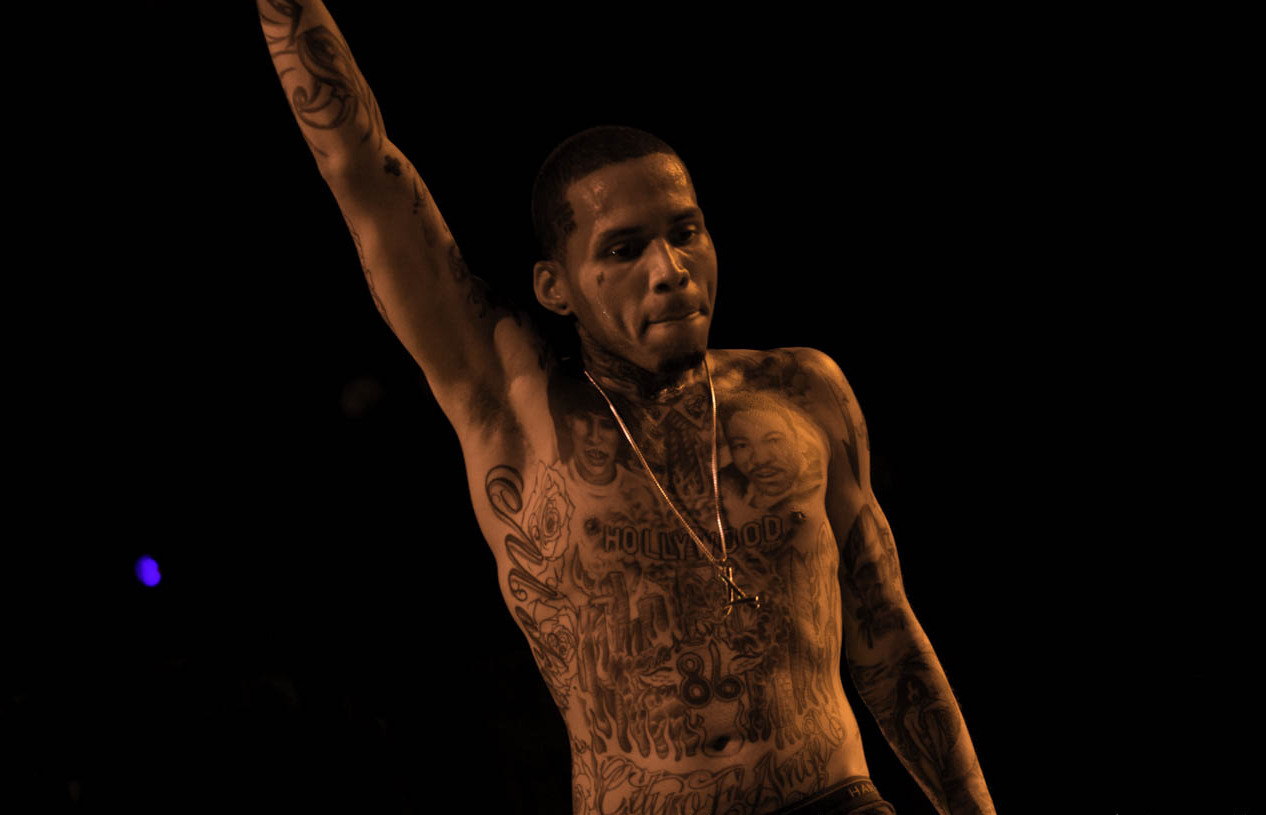
- Kid Ink performing in March 2012
- Studio albums: 7
- EPs: 3
- Singles: 36
- Mixtapes: 10

The discography of Kid Ink, an American rapper, consists of four studio albums, three extended plays, eight mixtapes and thirty-six singles (including sixteen as a featured artist).

After releasing his first mixtape, World Tour, under the name Rockstar, he started to gain popularity. At the beginning of the 2011 summer, he then released his second mixtape, Daydreamer, which was available for download on various sites that featured Cory Gunz, Maejor Ali, Ray J, Sean Kingston, Meek Mill, Bow Wow, along with others.

In September 2011, he released his third mixtape named Wheels Up that featured artists 2 Chainz, Nipsey Hussle, Tyga and more.

In 2012, he was a featured artist in the 2012 XXL Freshman class along with artists such as rappers Future and Macklemore. Kid Ink released his first independent album, Up & Away on June 12, 2012 to moderate success. The album was produced by Ned Cameron and Jahlil Beats among others. It peaked at number 20 on the US Billboard 200 in its first week. The album's first single, "Time of Your Life" preceded the album's release in early 2012 followed by the album's second single, "Lost in the Sauce". On November 21, 2012 Kid Ink released his fifth mixtape, Rocketshipshawty.

On January 4, 2013, he announced that he had signed a deal with RCA Records and premiered his first major label single, titled "Bad Ass" featuring Wale and Meek Mill and produced by Devin Cruise. The song would be released for digital download on January 22, 2013. It has since peaked at number 90 on the Billboard Hot 100 and number 27 on the Hot R&B/Hip-Hop Songs chart. On May 14, he announced his first project released under RCA, would be an EP titled Almost Home on May 28, 2013. It featured artists such as French Montana, Wale, Meek Mill, ASAP Ferg and Rico Love among others. Upon its release, the EP debuted at number 27 on the Billboard 200. It also produced the single "Money and the Power" which has been featured in HBO's Hard Knocks as well as in the sports video game NBA Live 14. On September 17, 2013, he released the first single from his second studio album My Own Lane, entitled "Show Me" featuring Chris Brown and produced by DJ Mustard. On November 4, 2013, he revealed that My Own Lane would be released on January 7, 2014.

== Albums ==
=== Studio albums ===
List of studio albums, with selected chart positions and certifications
Title	Album details	Peak chart positions										Certifications
Title	Album details	US	US R&B	US Rap	AUS	AUT	CAN	GER	NLD	SWI	UK	Certifications
Up & Away	Released: June 12, 2012 (US); Label: Tha Alumni Music Group; Formats: CD, LP, digital download	20	3	2	—	—	78	—	—	—	—	
My Own Lane	Released: January 7, 2014 (US); Labels: Tha Alumni Music Group, 88 Classic, RCA; Formats: CD, digital download	3	2	1	25	16	10	12	61	8	34	RIAA: Platinum; BPI: Silver
Full Speed	Released: January 30, 2015; Labels: Tha Alumni Music Group, 88 Classic, RCA; Formats: CD, digital download	14	1	1	15	12	12	10	72	7	10	RIAA: Gold; BPI: Silver
Alive	Released: April 9, 2021; Labels: Tha Alumni Music Group; Formats: CD, LP, digital download, streaming	—	—	—	—	—	—	—	—	—	—	
"—" denotes a recording that did not chart or was not released in that territory.

=== Commercial mixtapes ===
Title	Mixtape details	Peak chart positions					
Title	Mixtape details	US	US R&B	US Rap	CAN	NLD	SWI
Summer in the Winter	Released: December 25, 2015; Labels: Tha Alumni Music Group, 88 Classic, RCA; Formats: Digital download	50	10	8	50	93	73

=== Mixtapes ===
Title	Mixtape details
World Tour (as Rockstar)	Released: February 1, 2010; Format: Digital download, CD
Crash Landing	Released: November 15, 2010; Label: Tha Alumni Music Group; Format: Digital download, CD
Daydreamer	Released: June 21, 2011; Label: Tha Alumni Music Group; Format: Digital download, CD
Wheels Up	Released: October 10, 2011; Label: Tha Alumni Music Group; Format: Digital download, CD
Rocketshipshawty	Released: November 21, 2012; Label: Tha Alumni Music Group; Format: Digital download, CD
4B's (with Batgang)	Released: August 26, 2014; Label: Tha Alumni Music Group; Format: Digital download
RSS2	Released: September 20, 2016; Label: Tha Alumni Music Group; Format: Digital download

== Extended plays ==
List of extended plays, with selected chart positions
Title	EP details	Peak chart positions		
Title	EP details	US	US R&B	US Rap
Almost Home	Released: May 28, 2013 (US); Labels: Tha Alumni Music Group, 88 Classic, RCA; Format: Digital download	27	5	4
7 Series	Released: May 5, 2017; Labels: Tha Alumni Music Group, 88 Classic, RCA; Formats: Digital download	—	—	—
Missed Calls	Released: December 14, 2018; Labels: Tha Alumni Music Group, 88 Classic, RCA; Format: Digital download	—	—	—

== Singles ==
=== As lead artist ===
List of singles as lead artist, with selected chart positions and certifications, showing year released and album name
Title	Year	Peak chart positions										Certifications	Album
Title	Year	US	US R&B	US Rap	AUS	AUT	CAN	FRA	GER	SWI	UK	Certifications	Album
"Time of Your Life"	2012	106	—	—	—	—	—	—	—	—	—		Up & Away
"Lost in the Sauce"	2012	—	—	—	—	—	—	—	—	—	—		Up & Away
"Bad Ass" (featuring Meek Mill and Wale)	2013	90	27	21	—	—	—	—	—	—	—		Almost Home
"Money and the Power"	2013	—	—	—	—	—	—	—	70	—	81	RIAA: Gold	Almost Home
"Show Me" (featuring Chris Brown)	2013	13	4	2	46	47	67	58	36	32	23	RIAA: 4× Platinum; ARIA: Gold; BPI: Platinum; BVMI: Gold	My Own Lane
"Iz U Down" (featuring Tyga)	2013	—	— (Note: "Iz U Down" did not enter the Hot R&B/Hip-Hop Songs chart, but peaked at number 7 on the Bubbling Under R&B/Hip-Hop Singles chart, which acts as an extension to the Hot R&B/Hip-Hop Songs chart.)	—	—	—	—	—	91	—	—		My Own Lane
"Main Chick" (featuring Chris Brown)	2014	60	16	7	—	—	—	161	99	—	69	RIAA: Platinum; BPI: Silver	My Own Lane
"Body Language" (featuring Usher and Tinashe)	2014	72	21	15	77	—	—	104	54	—	46	RIAA: Platinum; BPI: Silver	Full Speed
"Hotel" (featuring Chris Brown)	2015	96	30	25	60	—	—	145	30	—	43	RIAA: Gold; BPI: Silver	Full Speed
"Be Real" (featuring Dej Loaf)	2015	43	12	7	—	—	—	—	77	—	155	RIAA: 2× Platinum; BPI: Silver; BVMI: Gold	Full Speed
"Ride Out" (with Tyga, Wale, YG and Rich Homie Quan)	2015	70	22	14	44	26	48	51	21	25	70	RIAA: Gold	Furious 7: Original Motion Picture Soundtrack
"Promise" (featuring Fetty Wap)	2015	57	19	17	61	—	86	—	—	—	—	RIAA: 2× Platinum; BPI: Silver	Summer in the Winter
"Nasty" (featuring Jeremih and Spice)	2016	—	—	—	—	—	—	—	—	—	—		Non-album single
"Lamborghini Dreamin'" (featuring Verse Simmonds)	2016	—	—	—	—	—	—	—	—	—	—		RSS2
"F with U" (featuring Ty Dolla $ign)	2017	—	— (Note: "F With U" did not enter the Hot R&B/Hip-Hop Songs chart, but peaked at number nine on the Bubbling Under R&B/Hip-Hop Singles chart.)	—	—	—	—	—	—	—	—	RIAA: Gold	7 Series
"Tell Somebody"	2018	—	—	—	—	—	—	—	—	—	—		Non-album singles
"One Time"	2018	—	—	—	—	—	—	—	—	—	—		Non-album singles
"Woop Woop"	2018	—	—	—	—	—	—	—	—	—	—		Non-album singles
"Big Deal"	2018	—	—	—	—	—	—	—	—	—	—		Missed Calls
"Cana" (featuring 24hrs)	2018	—	—	—	—	—	—	—	—	—	—		Non-album single
"No Budget" (featuring Rich the Kid)	2018	—	—	—	—	—	—	—	—	—	—		Missed Calls
"YUSO" (featuring Lil Wayne and Saweetie)	2018	—	—	—	—	—	—	—	—	—	—		Missed Calls
"Champion"	2019	—	—	—	—	—	—	—	—	—	—		Non-album singles
"No Stones" (featuring Casey Veggies)	2019	—	—	—	—	—	—	—	—	—	—		Non-album singles
"Miami"	2019	—	—	—	—	—	—	—	—	—	—		Non-album singles
"Randy MO$$"	2019	—	—	—	—	—	—	—	—	—	—		Non-album singles
"Bats Fly" (featuring Rory Fresco)	2019	—	—	—	—	—	—	—	—	—	—		Non-album singles
"Rich"	2019	—	—	—	—	—	—	—	—	—	—		Non-album singles
"Slide Up"	2019	—	—	—	—	—	—	—	—	—	—		Non-album singles
"Fcukizyoudoin"	2019	—	—	—	—	—	—	—	—	—	—		Non-album singles
"Ride Like a Pro" (featuring Reo Cragun)	2019	—	—	—	—	—	—	—	—	—	—		Non-album singles
"Holy Grail"	2020	—	—	—	—	—	—	—	—	—	—		Non-album singles
"Look at That"	2020	—	—	—	—	—	—	—	—	—	—		Alive
"Keep It Rollin, Pt.2"	2020	—	—	—	—	—	—	—	—	—	—		Non-album singles
"Fly 2 Mars" (featuring Rory Fresco)	2020	—	—	—	—	—	—	—	—	—	—		Non-album singles
"Just Chill"	2020	—	—	—	—	—	—	—	—	—	—		Non-album singles
"Live Forever"	2020	—	—	—	—	—	—	—	—	—	—		Non-album singles
"45"	2020	—	—	—	—	—	—	—	—	—	—		Alive
"Kiss the Sky" (featuring Hit Wxnder)	2020	—	—	—	—	—	—	—	—	—	—		Non-album singles
"4186 Freestyle"	2020	—	—	—	—	—	—	—	—	—	—		Non-album singles
"Thick Ole"	2020	—	—	—	—	—	—	—	—	—	—		Alive
"Red Light"	2021	—	—	—	—	—	—	—	—	—	—		Alive
"Night & Day"	2021	—	—	—	—	—	—	—	—	—	—		Alive
"Party" (featuring RMR)	2021	—	—	—	—	—	—	—	—	—	—		Non-album single
"Karma" (featuring Goldiie)	2021	—	—	—	—	—	—	—	—	—	—		Alive (Deluxe)
"While We Dancing" (featuring Verse Simmonds)	2022	—	—	—	—	—	—	—	—	—	—		Non-album singles
"Neat"	2022	—	—	—	—	—	—	—	—	—	—		Non-album singles
"Dead Wrong"	2022	—	—	—	—	—	—	—	—	—	—		Non-album singles
"Sega Time" (featuring Rory Fresco)	2022	—	—	—	—	—	—	—	—	—	—		Non-album singles
"Make Some Friends"	2022	—	—	—	—	—	—	—	—	—	—		Non-album singles
"How Would You Like It"	2022	—	—	—	—	—	—	—	—	—	—		Non-album singles
"Truth"	2022	—	—	—	—	—	—	—	—	—	—		Non-album singles
"Big Burna" (featuring Wiz Khalifa)	2022	—	—	—	—	—	—	—	—	—	—		Non-album singles
"Mykonos Flow"	2022	—	—	—	—	—	—	—	—	—	—		Non-album singles
"Drop That Low (When I Dip)" (with Tujamo)	2023	—	—	—	—	—	—	—	—	—	—		Non-album singles
"Put On (Am I Wrong)"	2023	—	—	—	—	—	—	—	—	—	—		Non-album singles
"LTW"	2023	—	—	—	—	—	—	—	—	—	—		Non-album singles
"Ready"	2025	—	—	—	—	—	—	—	—	—	—		Non-album singles
"Bet"	2025	—	—	—	—	—	—	—	—	—	—		Non-album singles
"Now or Later" (featuring Verse Simmonds)	2025	—	—	—	—	—	—	—	—	—	—		Non-album singles
"—" denotes a recording that did not chart or was not released in the region.

=== As featured artist ===
List of singles as featured artist, with selected chart positions and certifications, showing year released and album name
Title	Year	Peak chart positions										Certifications	Album
Title	Year	US	US Pop	US R&B	AUS	AUT	CAN	FRA	GER	SWI	UK	Certifications	Album
"Up Every Night" (Remix) (1982 featuring Cory Gunz and Kid Ink)	2012	—	—	—	—	—	—	—	—	—	—		Non-album single
"STFU" (Pries featuring Kid Ink)	2013	—	—	—	—	—	—	—	—	—	—		Copy, Paste, No Glue
"The Man" (Remix) (Aloe Blacc featuring Kid Ink)	2014	—	—	—	—	—	—	—	—	—	—		Non-album singles
"nEXt" (Remix) (Sevyn Streeter featuring Kid Ink)	2014	123	—	—	—	—	—	—	—	—	—		Non-album singles
"Delirious (Boneless)" (Steve Aoki, Chris Lake and Tujamo featuring Kid Ink)	2014	90	33	—	—	—	81	—	—	—	162	RIAA: Gold; MC: Gold	Neon Future I
"Me and My Team" (Maejor Ali featuring Trey Songz and Kid Ink)	2014	115	—	—	—	—	—	—	—	—	—		Non-album single
"Red Cup" (E-40 featuring T-Pain, Kid Ink and B.o.B)	2014	—	—	—	—	—	—	—	—	—	—		Sharp On All 4 Corners: Corner 1
"Worth It" (Fifth Harmony featuring Kid Ink)	2015	12	4	—	9	23	19	15	16	21	3	RIAA: 3× Platinum; ARIA: 2× Platinum; BPI: Platinum; BVMI: Gold; IFPI AUT: Gold; MC: 2× Platinum	Reflection
"Baby's In Love" (Jamie Foxx featuring Kid Ink)	2015	—	—	—	—	—	—	—	—	—	—		Hollywood: A Story of a Dozen Roses
"I'm Up" (Omarion featuring Kid Ink and French Montana)	2015	109	—	41	—	—	—	—	—	—	—		Non-album single
"That's How You Know" (Nico & Vinz featuring Kid Ink and Bebe Rexha)	2015	120	—	—	2	12	—	—	65	—	—	ARIA: Platinum	Cornerstone
"100" (Travis Barker featuring Kid Ink, Ty Dolla Sign, Iamsu! and Tyga)	2015	—	—	—	—	—	—	—	—	—	—		Non-album single
"Get Home" (JR Castro featuring Kid Ink and Quavo)	2015	—	—	51	—	—	—	—	—	—	—		Sexpectations, Vol.1
"I Love You" (Axwell Λ Ingrosso featuring Kid Ink)	2017	—	—	—	—	—	—	—	—	—	72		More Than You Know
"Mayday" (Shy'm featuring Kid Ink)	2017	—	—	—	—	—	—	42	—	—	—		Héros
"Touch" (Little Mix featuring Kid Ink)	2017	—	—	—	—	—	—	—	—	—	—		Glory Days: The Platinum Edition
"Look What U Made Me Do" (Hardhead featuring Kid Ink and Bricc Baby)	2017	—	—	—	—	—	—	—	—	—	—		Non-album singles
"Rumpshaker 18'" (Verse Simmonds featuring Kid Ink)	2017	—	—	—	—	—	—	—	—	—	—		Non-album singles
"Baby" (Yogi, Maleek Berry and Ray BLK featuring Kid Ink)	2018	—	—	—	—	—	—	—	—	—	—		Non-album singles
"Nonchalant" (Hardhead featuring Kid Ink)	2018	—	—	—	—	—	—	—	—	—	—		Non-album singles
"Miss It" (Remix) (Yung Bleu featuring Kid Ink)	2018	—	—	—	—	—	—	—	—	—	—		Non-album singles
"Feeling Like Love" (Ray J featuring Kid Ink)	2018	—	—	—	—	—	—	—	—	—	—		Non-album singles
"High For Me" (Olivia Noelle featuring Kid Ink)	2018	—	—	—	—	—	—	—	—	—	—		If Boys Could Cry
"King Without a Crown" (Punctual featuring Skinny Living and Kid Ink)	2018	—	—	—	—	—	—	—	—	—	—		Non-album single
"Vibe" (Dizzy Wright featuring Kid Ink)	2018	—	—	—	—	—	—	—	—	—	—		Don't Tell Me It Can't Be Done
"VVS Charm" (Rory Fresco featuring Kid Ink)	2019	—	—	—	—	—	—	—	—	—	—		816icko
"Exhausted" (Remix) (Philthy Rich featuring Yella Beezy, Kid Ink and TK Kravitz)	2019	—	—	—	—	—	—	—	—	—	—		The Remixes #4
"The Life" (Alexcis featuring Kid Ink)	2019	—	—	—	—	—	—	—	—	—	—		I Hate You To The Moon & Back
"Ride with Me" (Tungevaag featuring Kid Ink)	2021	—	—	—	—	—	—	117	—	—	—		Non-album single
"—" denotes a recording that did not chart or was not released in that territory

=== Promotional singles ===
List of promotional singles, with selected chart positions, showing year released and album name
Title	Year	Peak chart positions	Album
Title	Year	US Rap Digital	Album
"Sunset"	2013	—	Almost Home
"Bossin' Up" (featuring ASAP Ferg and French Montana)	2013	—	Almost Home
"No Option" (featuring King Los)	2013	46	My Own Lane
"No Miracles" (featuring Elle Varner and Machine Gun Kelly)	2013	38	My Own Lane
"Cool Back"	2014	—	Full Speed
"Blunted"	2014	—	Full Speed
"Like a Hott Boyy" (featuring Young Thug and Bric Baby Shitro)	2015	—	Full Speed
"Blowin' Swishers Pt.2" (featuring Starrah)	2015	—	Summer in the Winter
"GoldenEye"	2016	—	RSS2
"Die In It"	2016	—	RSS2
"One Day"	2016	—	RSS2
"Swish" (featuring 2 Chainz)	2017	—	7 Series
"Lottery"	2017	—	7 Series
"Supersoaka"	2017	—	7 Series
"Now It's Personal"	2017	—	Tekken 7
"Bad Habit"	2017	—	Non-album single
"Hoe Games"	2021	—	Alive (Deluxe)
"Go Mode" (featuring ISM)	2021	—	Alive (Deluxe)
"Fenty Secrets"	2021	—	Alive (Deluxe)
"—" denotes a recording that did not chart or was not released in that territory.

== Guest appearances ==
List of non-single guest appearances, with other performing artists, showing year released and album name
Title	Year	Other artist(s)	Album
"When I Sleep"	2011	Lil Wayne	None
"Highlights"	2012	Dorrough	Highlights
"Wait a Minute"	2012	Chris Webby, Bun B	Bars on Me
"Last Night"	2012	Mark Battles	Walking Distance
"That's All"	2012	Ty Dolla Sign	Beach House
"1 Girl, 2 Cups"	2012	Sterling Simms	Mary & Molly
"Same Ol' Story"	2012	DJ Drama, Schoolboy Q, Cory Gunz, Childish Gambino	Quality Street Music
"Let It Go"	2012	Glasses Malone, E-40	Glass House
"Pussy on My Mind"	2013	Bow Wow	Greenlight 5
"Victorious"	2013	Funkmaster Flex	Who You Mad At? Me or Yourself?
"Slip n' Slide"	2013	Jonn Hart	None
"On the Low"	2013	Logic, Trinidad James	Young Sinatra: Welcome to Forever
"Blast"	2013	Dorrough, Problem	Shut the City Down
"CNN"	2013	DJ Mustard	Ketchup
"Creez"	2013	Ty Dolla Sign, B.o.B	Beach House 2
"Fashion"	2013	Dizzy Wright, Honey Cocaine	The Golden Age
"Woke Up This Morning"	2014	DJ Whoo Kid, Devin Cruise	SXEW Vol. 1
"Kiss Goodnight"	2014	Eric Bellinger	The Rebirth
"Kama Sutra"	2014	Jason Derulo	Talk Dirty
"Rude" (Remix)	2014	MAGIC!, Ty Dolla Sign, Travis Barker	None
"Me Too"	2014	King Los, Jeremih	Zero Gravity II
"Pull Up"	2014	L.A. Leakers, Sage the Gemini, Iamsu!	None
"Love Me No More"	2014	Chris Brown	None
"Dangerous"	2015	Prince Royce	Double Vision
"Up Every Night"	2015	Termanology, Cory Gunz	Term Brady
"Dum Dada"	2015	Pia Mia	None
"Good Good"	2016	Lil Durk, DeJ Loaf	Lil Durk 2X
"Roll Sum Up"	2016	Fetty Wap	None
"Your Number" (Remix)	2016	Ayo Jay, Chris Brown	None
"2 Seater"	2016	E-40	The D-Boy Diary: Book 2
"With You Tonight (Hasta el Amanecer)" (Remix)	2016	Nicky Jam	Fenix
"Us"	2018	Elley Duhé	Uncle Drew: The Motion Picture Soundtrack

== Production discography ==
=== 2008 ===
Nipsey Hussle – Bullets Ain't Got No Names Vol. 1

- 01. "Bullets Ain't Got No Names" (produced with Bangout)

=== 2011 ===
Diddy – Dirty Money – LoveLove vs. HateLove

- 03. "Sade" (produced with Rob Holladay)
