= Almost Home (Kid Ink EP) =

EP by Kid Ink
- Released: May 28, 2013
- Recorded: 2012–13
- Genre: Hip-hop
- Length: 25:48
- Labels: Tha Alumni Music Group; 88 Classic; RCA
- Producers: Allen Ritter; Devin Cruise; KB; Lifted; Ned Cameron; N4; Rico Love; Vinylz; Jonathan Lauture

Kid Ink chronology
Up & Away (2012)	Almost Home (2013)	My Own Lane (2014)

Singles from Almost Home
- 1. "Bad Ass" Released: January 22, 2013; 2. "Money and the Power" Released: May 28, 2013

Almost Home is the major label debut extended play (EP) by American hip hop recording artist Kid Ink; it was released on May 28, 2013, by Tha Alumni Music Group, 88 Classic, RCA Records in the United States. The album was produced by various producers, such as Lifted, Rico Love and Ned Cameron along with guest appearances by Meek Mill, Wale, French Montana, and ASAP Ferg. Upon its release, the EP debuted at number 27 on the US Billboard 200.

== Background ==
On January 4, 2013, Kid Ink has announced he had signed a deal with RCA Records and premiered the lead single for his debut project titled "Bad Ass" featuring Wale and Meek Mill. "Bad Ass" was meant to be a single to tide fans over for his first full-length. RCA associate director of marketing Shani Fuller said, "We wanted to continue along the theme of being an indie and releasing music all the time," "We just really wanted to feed his fans with new music and a new look as we approached his album later in the year." Six tracks were selected from more than 140 possible cuts for the disc and a few songs were streamed ahead of release, including "Sunset," a track that Kid Ink says "really motivated the EP. The EP features additional guest appearances from ASAP Ferg, and French Montana on a remix of his mixtape track "Bossin' Up". On the following day, after the EPs release he released a freestyle which was set to be the EPs first track.

== Singles ==
The EPs lead single "Bad Ass" was released for digital download on January 22, 2013. The song was released to Rhythm Crossover radio in the United States on February 26, 2013. It has since peaked at number 90 on the Billboard Hot 100 and number 27 on the Hot R&B/Hip-Hop Songs chart.

The EPs second single "Money and the Power" produced by N4, Ned Cameron and Jonathan Lauture, was released on May 28, 2013. It was released to radio on July 19, 2013. The song peaked at number 70 on the German Top 100 songs chart and 52 on the Billboard Hot R&B/Hip-Hop Songs chart. "Money and the Power" was one of the official theme songs of WrestleMania 31.

== Commercial performance ==
Almost Home debuted at number 27 on the US Billboard 200 in its first week of release and sold 20,000 copies in the United States.

== Critical reception ==
Professional ratings
Review scores
Source	Rating
AllMusic	3/5 stars
Artistdirect	4.5/5 stars
DJBooth	3.5/5 stars
PopCrush	4/5 stars
The Source	(positive)
XXL	(L)

Upon its release, Almost Home was met with generally positive reviews from music critics. Rick Florino of Artistdirect said "Ink's got an undeniable ability to infuse that sharp sensibility into even catchier fare like the R&B-tinged goodbye "Was It Worth It" featuring Sterling Simms, while elsewhere "Sunset" coasts from video game-esque keyboards into a cinematic narrative cruising Cali with no cares." DJBooth.net said "Kid Ink knows what he does well and has it down to a fine science; he demonstrate his ability to put together a high-energy song and his hooks are top notch, while not without its flaws, the Almost Home EP is a good jumping off point for the emcee. I see a lot of talent, but there is room for growth."

Trent Fitzgerald of PopCrush praised it saying, "The collection boasts six anthemic tunes that should get you charged for the summer months ahead. Standouts include the bombastic song "Money and the Power", the inspiring track "Sunset" and the laid-back remix of "Bad Ass"." The Source said of the EP "What makes this it appealing though is the balance Kid Ink found in allowing listeners into the carefree, TMZ lifestyle he’s caught up in due to his fame and also capturing themes the average person can relate to-grinding everyday to achieve goals." NMB of XXL said, "Throughout the EP, Ink shows confidence in his rhymes and a strong command of his hooks, slinging catchy boasts alongside ASAP Ferg and French Montana on “Bossin’ Up”. Walking the line between singing and rapping on songs like “Fuck Sleep” and “Sunset” Ink’s sound has a distinctly laid-back California feel on the whole."

== Track listing ==
No.	Title	Writer(s)	Producer(s)	Length
1.	"Bossin' Up" (featuring ASAP Ferg and French Montana)	Brian Collins; Karim Kharbouch; Darold Ferguson; Danny Lifted	Lifted	6:44
2.	"Fuck Sleep" (featuring Rico Love)	Collins; Richard Butler	Rico Love	3:57
3.	"Was it Worth It" (featuring Sterling Simms)	Collins; Anderson Hernandez; Allen Ritter	Vinylz; Ritter	3:39
4.	"Money and the Power"	Collins; Edward Cameron	N4; Ned Cameron; Jonathan Lauture (co.)	3:26
5.	"Sunset"	Collins; Cameron	Ned Cameron	3:47
6.	"Bad Ass" (featuring Meek Mill and Wale)	Collins; Robert Williams; Olubowale Akintimehin; Devin Montgomery	KB; Devin Cruise	4:15
Total length:				25:48

== Charts ==
Chart	Peak position
UK R&B Albums Chart	34
US Billboard 200	27
US Top R&B/Hip-Hop Albums	5
US Top Rap Albums	4
