= Up & Away (Kid Ink album) =

Studio album by Kid Ink
- Released: June 12, 2012
- Recorded: 2011–2012
- Genre: Hip-hop; R&B
- Length: 48:55
- Label: Tha Alumni Music Group; FoundationMedia
- Producer: The Arsenals; Glyn Beats; The Amazinz; Cardiak; DJ Invasion; DJ Spinz; FKi; Jahlil Beats; KB; Capsvl; Mr. Hype; Ned Cameron; Tnyce & Backpack

Kid Ink chronology
Up & Away (2012)	Almost Home (2013)

Singles from Up & Away
- 1. "Time of Your Life" Released: February 7, 2012; 2. "Lost in the Sauce" Released: April 26, 2012

Up & Away is the debut studio album by American rapper Kid Ink. It was released on June 12, 2012, by the independently incorporated record label Tha Alumni Music Group. The album was supported by the singles: "Time of Your Life" and "Lost in the Sauce". Despite not being released as a single, the album's twelfth track, "Hell and Back", received Platinum certification by the Recording Industry Association of America (RIAA).

== Commercial performance ==
The album debuted at number 20 on the Billboard 200, with first-week sales of 20,000 copies in the United States. As of October 18, 2012, the album has sold 45,000 copies in the United States.

== Singles ==
• "Time of Your Life" was released as the album's lead single on February 7, 2012.

• "Lost in the Sauce" was released as the second single from the album on April 26, 2012.

== Track listing ==
No.	Title	Producer(s)	Length
1.	"No One Left"	Tnyce & Backpack	3:58
2.	"Is It You"	The Amazinz	4:58
3.	"Time of Your Life"	Ned Cameron	3:55
4.	"Act Like That (3-Some)"	Capsvl	3:37
5.	"Walk in the Club"	Ned Cameron	3:38
6.	"Drippin'"	KB	2:48
7.	"Lost in the Sauce"	Jahlil Beats	3:29
8.	"Roll Out"	The Arsenals	4:11
9.	"Rumpshaker"	FKi; DJ Spinz	3:12
10.	"Carry On"	Cardiak	4:10
11.	"Neva Gave a Fuck"	Mr. Hype; DJ Invasion	3:17
12.	"Hell & Back"	Glyn Beats	4:10
13.	"Crazy (Loco)" (iTunes bonus track)	The Arsenals	3:12
Total length:			48:55

== Charts ==
=== Weekly charts ===
Chart (2012)	Peak position
Canadian Albums (Nielsen SoundScan)	78
UK Album Downloads (OCC)	93
UK Independent Albums (OCC)	43
UK R&B Albums (OCC)	21
US Billboard 200	20
US Top R&B/Hip-Hop Albums (Billboard)	3

=== Year-end charts ===
Chart (2012)	Position
US Top R&B/Hip-Hop Albums (Billboard)	96
