= Bad Ass (song) =

Single by Kid Ink featuring Meek Mill and Wale

from the album Almost Home
- Released: January 22, 2013
- Recorded: 2013
- Genre: Hip hop
- Length: 4:58
- Label: Tha Alumni Music Group; RCA
- Songwriters: Brian Todd Collins; Robert Williams; Olubowale Akintimehin; Devin Montgomery
- Producer: Devin Cruise

Kid Ink singles chronology
| "Bad Ass" (2013) | "Money and the Power" (2013) |

Meek Mill singles chronology
| "Young & Gettin' It" (2012) | "Bad Ass" (2013) | "Believe It" (2013) |

Wale singles chronology
| "Diced Pineapples" (2012) | "Bad Ass" (2013) | "Bad" (2013) |

"Bad Ass" is a song by American rapper Kid Ink with guest appearances from fellow rappers Meek Mill and Wale. The original version of the song appeared on Ink's 2012 mixtape Rocketshipshawty, where guest performers were omitted. The song was released by RCA Records on January 22, 2013, as the first single from his debut major label extended play Almost Home (2013). Furthermore, it appears as a bonus track on the deluxe edition of his debut studio album My Own Lane (2014).

It was co-written by all three artists, and Devin Cruise, who also produced the song. It peaked at number 90 on the Billboard Hot 100 and number 27 on the Hot R&B/Hip-Hop Songs chart.

== Music video ==
The music video was directed by Alex Nazari and was released on March 4, 2013.

== Remix ==
On May 10, 2013, the official remix was released featuring west coast rappers YG and Problem. The remix also featured a reworked beat by KB and Mike Maven.

== Track listing ==
| No. | Title | Writer(s) | Producer(s) | Length |
|---|---|---|---|---|
| 1. | "Bad Ass" (featuring Meek Mill & Wale) | Brian Todd Collins; Robert Williams; Olubowale Akintimehin; Devin Montgomery | Devin Cruise | 4:58 |

== Chart performance ==
On the week of February 9, 2013, "Bad Ass" debuted at number 90 on the Billboard Hot 100, but left the next week. That same week, it debuted at number 27 on the Hot R&B/Hip-Hop Songs chart, but fell sixteen spots to number 43 for the week of February 16, before leaving the chart completely.

| Chart (2013) | Peak position |
|---|---|
| US Billboard Hot 100 | 90 |
| US Hot R&B/Hip-Hop Songs (Billboard) | 27 |

== Release history ==
| Country | Date | Format | Label |
|---|---|---|---|
| United States | January 22, 2013 | Digital download | Tha Alumni Music Group, RCA Records |
| United States | February 26, 2013 | Rhythmic contemporary radio | Tha Alumni Music Group, RCA Records |
