= Iz U Down =

2013 single by Kid Ink

Single by Kid Ink featuring Tyga

from the album My Own Lane
- Released: December 17, 2013
- Recorded: 2013
- Genre: Hip hop
- Length: 3:55
- Label: Tha Alumni; 88 Classic; RCA
- Songwriters: Brian Collins; Michael Stevenson; Michael Holmes
- Producer: Mike DZL

Kid Ink singles chronology
"Show Me" (2013)	"Iz U Down" (2013)	"Main Chick" (2014)

Tyga singles chronology
"Wait for a Minute" (2013)	"Iz U Down" (2013)	"Loyal" (2014)

"Iz U Down" is a song by American rapper Kid Ink featuring fellow American rapper Tyga, released on December 17, 2013 as the second single from the former's second studio album, My Own Lane. The song, produced by Mike DZL, peaked at number 91 on the German Singles Chart and number 7 on the US Bubbling Under R&B/Hip-Hop Singles chart

== Background and composition ==
On December 17, 2013, Kid Ink released "Iz U Down" featuring rapper Tyga as the second official single from his second studio album My Own Lane. It was then made available with the pre-order for My Own Lane on iTunes, along with the promotional singles "No Option" featuring King Los and "No Miracles" featuring Elle Varner and Machine Gun Kelly.

"Iz U Down" is a club-oriented track that details Ink and Tyga in the club flirting with attractive women that catch their eyes. Their goal for the night is to end up having a threesome with two women. The song was produced by Mike DZL, who constructed the song's instrumental with "smooth melodic elements and tough drums."

== Recording ==
Kid Ink spoke to Complex how the collaboration came together saying, "We already had a cool relationship. We booked the same studio, so he was in the other room." Ink had been listening to the song thinking about who he wanted to have featured on the song. He then said, "Yo, Tyga’s next door. You want to run by and play it for him?" Then that same day, Tyga recorded his verse for the song and it was completed that day."

== Critical reception ==
"Iz U Down" was met with generally positive reviews from music critics. Sheldon Pierce of XXL said, it "is a variant of the rap chart ready jingles supplied in such high quantity on the album with the distinct difference being its lower sonic register. Kid Ink unleashes a rather dexterous flow, and the record has a subdued appeal that you don’t fully appreciate right away." Chris Thomas of HipHopWired said, "In the opening moments, it's clear that the record has that bounce; the one and the same kind that makes the guy wearing a turtleneck in the club feel himself. Kid Ink complements the sonics with verses that deliver a straight forward question to women: "is you down?"." David Jeffries of AllMusic called it the new standard bearer for pop-rap tracks aimed at the strip club. Jesse James of StupidDOPE called it "something infectious, smooth, and incredibly dope for our ears to devour." Brent Faulkner of Starpulse referred to the song as a "surefire hit" and one of the album's best songs. AJ of Uproxx's SmokingSection called it one of the album's standout songs.

== Live performances ==
On January 14, 2014, Kid Ink performed "Iz U Down", along with special guest Tyga, on DJ Skee's SKEE Live.

== Music video ==
On December 23, 2013, Kid Ink and Tyga filmed the music video for "Iz U Down". Subsequently, Kid Ink posted pictures of the shoot on Twitter and Instagram. On January 7, 2014, the behind the scenes video, filmed on the set of the music video was released. Even though they had collaborated multiple times in the past, it was their first time shooting a music video for one of their collaborations. After the video's release was delayed, on January 19, 2014, Kid Ink confirmed that the video would be released in the coming week. The raunchy video was then released on January 23, 2014.

== Chart performance ==
Chart (2013)	Peak position
Germany (GfK)	91
US Bubbling Under R&B/Hip-Hop Singles (Billboard)	7

== Release history ==
Country	Date	Format	Label	Ref.
United States	December 17, 2013	Digital download	Tha Alumni Music Group; 88 Classic; RCA Records	
