= Main Chick =

2014 single by Kid Ink

Single by Kid Ink featuring Chris Brown

from the album X Files and My Own Lane
- Released: March 11, 2014
- Recorded: 2013
- Genre: Hip hop; R&B
- Length: 3:17
- Label: Tha Alumni; 88 Classic; RCA
- Songwriters: Brian Collins; Chris Brown; Jeremih Felton; Dijon McFarlane; Glenda Proby
- Producer: DJ Mustard

Kid Ink singles chronology
"Iz U Down" (2013)	"Main Chick" (2014)	"nEXt" (2014)

Chris Brown singles chronology
"Loyal" (2013)	"Main Chick" (2014)	"New Flame" (2014)

"Main Chick" is a song by American rapper Kid Ink from his second studio album My Own Lane (2014). The song was serviced to rhythmic contemporary radio in the U.S. on March 11, 2014, as the album's third single. The song features a guest appearance by Chris Brown, with production provided by DJ Mustard.

"Main Chick" was originally included on Chris Brown's X Files mixtape, and after the positive response, it was included on My Own Lane. It debuted at number 69 on the UK Singles Chart upon the album's release and peaked at number 60 on the US Billboard Hot 100 chart.

== Background and recording ==
"Main Chick" was produced by DJ Mustard and was recorded by Chris Brown and Kid Ink, during the same session as their hit single "Show Me". The song was originally not going to be featured on the album, so it was included on Chris Brown's mixtape X-Files. It ended up receiving an extremely positive response from fans, making him reconsider the decision to include it on the album. Following the release of the track list for My Own Lane, it was confirmed that the song would be featured on Ink's second studio album after all. However, Kid Ink made slight adjustments to the album version of the song. The Alumni Music Group, 88 Classic and RCA Records serviced "Main Chick" to rhythmic contemporary radio in the United States on March 11, 2014, and to urban contemporary radio in the US on March 25, 2014.

== Critical reception ==
"Main Chick" was met with generally positive reviews from music critics. Edwin Ortiz of HipHopDX said, the song displays "early and often Ink's penchant for tailoring melodies for the masses." Sheldon Pearce of XXL called it a certified hit in any time zone. Grant Jones of RapReviews praised the song's production and called it one of the album's best songs. David Jeffries of AllMusic called it a light, airy and attractive track. Brent Faulkner of Starpulse said, the song was good, but not elite.

== Live performances ==
On May 6, 2014, Kid Ink performed "Main Chick" and "Show Me" on Jimmy Kimmel Live! with Travis Barker and Eric Bellinger substituting for Chris Brown.

== Remixes ==
The official remix of the song features Chris Brown, French Montana, Yo Gotti, Tyga, Lil Bibby and a new verse by Kid Ink. It was released on July 7, 2014.

Rapper Tyga, a frequent collaborator of Kid Ink, released a remix to the song on January 30, 2014. On February 10, 2014, comedian Kevin Hart requested LL Cool J's "I Need Love" on DJ Whoo Kid's radio show. Whoo Kidd then dared LL Cool J to send him a verse ASAP if he could. Thirty to forty minutes later, LL Cool J sent him the verse over Kid Ink's "Main Chick".

== Chart performance ==
=== Weekly charts ===
Chart (2014)	Peak position
Australian Urban Singles Chart (ARIA)	11
Belgium (Ultratip Bubbling Under Flanders)	28
Belgium (Ultratip Bubbling Under Wallonia)	18
Belgium Urban (Ultratop Flanders)	25
France (SNEP)	161
Germany (GfK)	99
UK Singles (Official Charts)	69
UK Hip Hop/R&B (Official Charts)	13
US Billboard Hot 100	60
US Hot R&B/Hip-Hop Songs (Billboard)	16
US R&B/Hip-Hop Airplay (Billboard)	18
US Rhythmic Airplay (Billboard)	3

=== Year-end charts ===
Chart (2014)	position
US Hot R&B/Hip-Hop Songs (Billboard)	43
US Rhythmic (Billboard)	17

== Certifications ==
Region	Certification	Certified units/sales
Australia (ARIA)	Gold	35,000^{‡}
Canada (Music Canada)	Gold	40,000^{‡}
New Zealand (RMNZ)	Platinum	30,000^{‡}
United Kingdom (BPI)	Silver	200,000^{‡}
United States (RIAA)	Platinum	1,000,000^{‡}
^{‡} Sales+streaming figures based on certification alone.

== Release history ==
Country	Date	Format	Label	Ref.
United States	March 11, 2014	Rhythmic contemporary radio	Tha Alumni Music Group; 88 Classic; RCA Records	
United States	March 25, 2014	Mainstream urban radio	Tha Alumni Music Group; 88 Classic; RCA Records	
United States	March 25, 2014	Urban contemporary radio	Tha Alumni Music Group; 88 Classic; RCA Records	
United Kingdom	June 9, 2014	Urban contemporary radio	Tha Alumni Music Group; 88 Classic; RCA Records	
