= Money and the Power =

2013 single by Kid Ink

Single by Kid Ink

from the album Almost Home
- Released: May 28, 2013
- Recorded: 2013
- Genre: Pop rap; hip hop
- Length: 3:26
- Label: Tha Alumni Music Group; RCA
- Songwriters: Brian Collins; Edward Cameron
- Producers: N4; Ned Cameron; Jonathan Lauture (co.)

Kid Ink singles chronology
"Bad Ass" (2013)	"Money and the Power" (2013)	"Show Me" (2013)

"Money and the Power" is a song by American rapper Kid Ink, produced by N4 and Ned Cameron, with co-production by Jonathan Lauture. The song was released as the second single from his major label debut EP, Almost Home on May 28, 2013, and was later included on the deluxe edition of Ink's studio album My Own Lane. The song peaked at number 70 on the German Singles Chart and at 21 on the UK R&B Chart.

== Music video ==
On July 19, 2013, Kid Ink released a lyric video for "Money and the Power" via VEVO. On September 12, 2013, Kid Ink released the Los Angeles-shot music video via VEVO.

== Performances ==
Alongside Travis Barker and Skylar Grey, Kid Ink performed "Money and the Power" during WrestleMania 31 on March 29, 2015 at Levi's Stadium, as part of a medley with David Guetta and Skylar Grey's "Rise"—both songs having served as the theme music for the event.

== Critical reception ==
"Money and the Power" received generally positive reviews from music critics. DJBooth.net praised his sung-rap style, and named the song the most radio ready song from the EP. Rick Florino of Artistdirect called the song a "irresistible cut" from Almost Home. Trent Fitzgerald of PopCrush called the song a "standout and a bombastic anthem that Kid Ink is famous for."

== Chart performance ==
Chart (2013)	Peak position
Germany (GfK)	70
UK Singles (Official Charts)	81
UK Hip Hop/R&B (Official Charts)	15
US Bubbling Under R&B/Hip-Hop Singles (Billboard)	2

== Certifications ==
Region	Certification	Certified units/sales
United States (RIAA)	Gold	500,000^{‡}
^{‡} Sales+streaming figures based on certification alone.

== Release history ==
Country	Date	Format	Label
United States	May 28, 2013	Digital download	Tha Alumni Music Group, RCA Records
United States	July 19, 2013	Urban contemporary radio	Tha Alumni Music Group, RCA Records
