= My Own Lane =

Studio album by Kid Ink
- Released: January 7, 2014
- Recorded: 2012–13
- Genre: Hip-hop
- Length: 47:35
- Labels: Tha Alumni Music Group; 88 Classic; RCA
- Producers: DJ Mustard; Arthur McArthur; Cardiak; Danja; Devin Cruise; KB; Larrance Dopson; Lasanna Harris; Lifted; Mike DZL; Mikhail Cronin; M-Millz; Ned Cameron; N4; Jonathan Lauture; Sham "Sak Pase" Joseph; soFLY and Nius; The Runners; SoundZ; The Futuristics; The Optimist

Kid Ink chronology
Almost Home (2013)	My Own Lane (2014)	Full Speed (2015)

Singles from My Own Lane
- 1. "Show Me" Released: September 17, 2013; 2. "Iz U Down" Released: December 17, 2013; 3. "Main Chick" Released: March 25, 2014

My Own Lane is the second studio album by American rapper Kid Ink. The album was released on January 7, 2014, by Tha Alumni Music Group, 88 Classic, and RCA Records. Recording for the album took place during 2013 and finished in November 2013. The album's production was handled by DJ Mustard, Cardiak, The Runners, The Futuristics, Arthur McArthur, soFLY and Nius and Ned Cameron, among others. Kid Ink collaborated with various artists on the album including Chris Brown, Tyga, French Montana, ASAP Ferg, Pusha T, Elle Varner, Machine Gun Kelly, King Los, Meek Mill, Wale, and August Alsina, among others.

The album was supported by the singles, "Show Me" featuring Chris Brown, "Iz U Down" featuring Tyga, and "Main Chick" also featuring Chris Brown. Following its release, the album was met with generally positive reviews from music critics. It also debuted at number three on the Billboard 200, selling 50,000 copies in the United States during its first week. The song "Hello World" was featured in the videogame WWE 2K16.

== Background ==
On January 4, 2013, Kid Ink announced that he had signed a record deal with RCA Records and premiered his first major label single, titled "Bad Ass" featuring Wale and Meek Mill. In May 2013, Kid Ink confirmed the album was about 45 percent finished. On September 4, 2013, Kid Ink appeared on Los Angeles' Power 106 to announce his major label debut studio album would be titled, My Own Lane. He explained the title saying, "My Own Lane is my struggle, because I came from a producer background and I listen to all kinds of different music and don't really limit myself to what I do. It's hard for people to categorize me in a specific lane, and be like, He's this kind of artist. There's so many different areas I'm pulling from, I have to just create my own lane, in a sense."

Following the release of Almost Home in May 2013, RCA Records senior VP of A&R J. Grand revealed a September 2013 for Ink's second studio album. In October 2013, Ink stated in interviews that the album would be released in December 2013. It was his intent to release the album before the end of 2013. On November 4, 2013, Ink revealed that My Own Lane will be released on January 7, 2014. On December 2, 2013, Kid Ink revealed the black-and-white cover artwork for the album.

== Recording and production ==
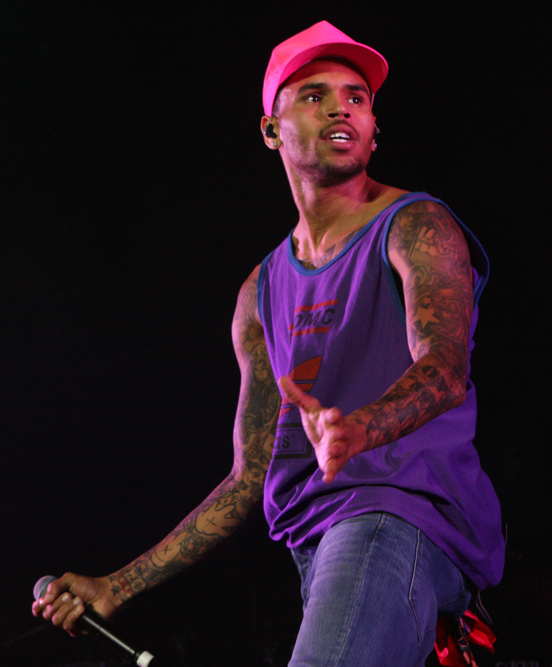
Singer Chris Brown and Kid Ink recorded two songs "Show Me" and "Main Chick" during a single night.

The album's recording process begun in late 2012, following Kid Ink's signing to RCA Records. He promised bigger guest appearances on this album compared to his independently released debut album. At the time of the release of Almost Home he had already had 140 songs recorded. During the recording process he collaborated with other artists including singer Chris Brown, who he recorded at least three songs with, Eric Bellinger, August Alsina, YG and Styles P, among others. The Styles P track would be cut from the album and be released for free during the album's promotional run. Ink also worked with various record producers including frequent collaborator Ned Cameron, Pharrell Williams, DJ Mustard, 808 Mafia, Metro Boomin', and Sham Joseph among others. In an October 2013 interview with The BoomBox, Ink also confirmed working with producers Boi-1da, Cardiak, Jahlil Beats, and T-Minus.

Near the end of the recording process, Ink had around 25 records that he had to trim down from, to decide which would make the album. In late November 2013, executive producer DJ Ill Will confirmed that the two had completed the album. The final track listing revealed that Chris Brown, Tyga, August Alsina, King Los, Pusha T, Elle Varner, Machine Gun Kelly, Bei Maejor, Meek Mill, Wale, ASAP Ferg and French Montana would all be featured on the album. The final version of the album featured production from The Runners, The Futuristics, Arthur McArthur, Cardiak, Danja, Devin Cruise, DJ Mustard, Larrance Dopson of 1500 or Nothin', Lifted, Mike DZL, Ned Cameron, Sham Joseph, and soFLY and Nius among others.

== Music and lyrics ==
On the album's opener "Hello World", "Ink employs a catchy sing-song flow over pop rock drums and a joyous piano" backed instrumental. "The Movement" features Ink rapping about his success over a kinetic drum beat, horns and brooding bass produced by Danja and contains a sample of "Let Your Feelings Show" by Earth, Wind & Fire. Two collaborations, "No Option" featuring King Los and "Murda" featuring Pusha T are lyrical assaults and the "hardened core" of the album. "We Just Came to Party" is a collaboration with Def Jam artist August Alsina. The Maejor Ali featuring "I Don't Care" features Kid Ink rapping in an R&B tinged flow. The standard edition album closer, "More Than a King" features Ink rapping metaphorically "pounding his chest over an ever-changing beat."

== Release and promotion ==
On May 14, 2013, Kid Ink announced his first project released by RCA, a digital-only EP titled Almost Home, which it was released on May 28, 2013. The EP featured artists, such as French Montana, Wale, Meek Mill, ASAP Ferg and Rico Love, among others. Upon its release, the EP debuted at number 27 on the US Billboard 200 and it has sold 15,000 copies in its first week. It was supported by the single's "Bad Ass" and "Money and the Power" both will be included on the deluxe edition of My Own Lane. Ink spoke of the EP's sound compared to the album saying, "The EP was a taste for the summer, the records were directed more toward the summer. I don't want it to feel like the album is gonna sound exactly like that, but I do think certain records on there like "Bossin' Up" and "Money and the Power" and "Fuck Sleep," which are records I feel like have such a strong sound and a brand new sound for me that I did drag them over– not those specific records, but those vibes."

Starting from November 2013 through the end of 2013, Kid Ink toured Europe on the Roll Up tour in promotion of the album. On January 7, 2014, Ink performed "Show Me" on Conan with DJ Mustard and followed that with performances on BET's 106 & Park and DJ Skee's Skee Live on January 9 and 14. On April 1, 2014, Kid Ink will begin the My Own Lane concert tour, which will feature King Los and Bizzy Cook as supporting acts. The tour is sponsored by Skype and will run until May 31, 2014. On April 28, 2014, the music video for "No Option" was released. On June 16, 2014, the music video for "More Than a King" was released. On July 31, 2014, the music video for "I Don't Care" was released.

== Singles ==
On September 17, 2013, Kid Ink released "Show Me" featuring Chris Brown as the album's first single. "Show Me" was produced by DJ Mustard and samples Robin S.'s 1993 hit "Show Me Love". On November 12, 2013, the Chris Brown-directed music video was premiered on MTV. The song has since peaked at 13 and 36 on the US Billboard Hot 100 and the German Top 100 Singles chart respectively.

On December 16, 2013, the King Los-featuring "No Option" was released as the album's first promotional single. Then the following day, "Iz U Down" featuring Tyga was released as the album's second official single and "No Miracles" featuring Elle Varner and Machine Gun Kelly was released as the album's second promotional single. On December 23, 2013, Kid Ink and Tyga filmed the music video for "Iz U Down". On January 7, 2014, Rolling Stone premiered the music video for "No Miracles". The music video for "Iz U Down" was released on January 23, 2014.

The other Chris Brown collaboration "Main Chick" was serviced to rhythmic contemporary radio in the United States on March 11, 2014, as the album's third official single.

== Critical reception ==
Professional ratings
Aggregate scores
Source	Rating
Metacritic	65/100
Review scores
Source	Rating
AllMusic	3.5/5 stars
Boston Globe	(mixed)
DJBooth	3/5 stars
HipHopDX	3/5 stars
Starpulse	3.5/5 stars
RapReviews	6/10
XXL	4/5 (XL)

My Own Lane was met with generally positive reviews from music critics. At Metacritic, which assigns a normalized rating out of 100 to reviews from mainstream critics, the album received an average score of 65, based on 6 reviews, indicating "generally favorable reviews". Sheldon Pearce writing for XXL stated, "Kid Ink is a masterful replicator that reinvents genre's strengths and refashions them into a sound that moves forward while managing to stay true to its LA hip-hop roots. He hits all the high notes, tapping into the club energy that will undoubtedly make him a star, but he also hits all the right notes, crafting the more grounded records that will keep him humble. There aren't many who can effortlessly make the transition from mixtape rapper to hitmaker. For Kid Ink, it is proving to be an incredibly smooth one." David Jeffries of AllMusic said, "Mixing the hazy, lazy feeling of cloud rap with a sound that's slick and entirely prepared to be the 2014 definition of radio-friendly, L.A.-based Kid Ink isn't necessarily in My Own Lane because of his patched-together style, but the talented, Drake-sounding rapper is certainly unique when it comes to cocky career development [...] Approach this release as album number two and it comes off as a celebration based on past success, so use Up & Away as an intro, then join Ink and all the inspired party people he invited to My Own Lane." Edwin Ortiz of HipHopDX stated, "Kid Ink's My Own Lane lacks any creative risks, but it bridges his mainstream appeal of 2013 with a new stylistic presence."

DJBooth commented that, "Purely as a rapper, Kid Ink doesn't do much on My Own Lane to show us who he really is or what he's capable of. Sure, his basic rhyme patterns and simple flows suffice over an outstanding beat or side-by-side with a quality hook, but his tone isn't distinct and his lyrics do no more than fill the space between catchy hooks with words." No Option" is the album's lyrical peak, but King Los' witty guest verses hardly make up for a lackluster musical foundation and a repetitive hook. "More Than a King" is easily the highlight of the album, and really its only true gem. The shifting instrumental, provided by Bay area upstart Ned Cameron, is downright filthy. Gravely vocal clips taken from an unidentified film dialogue precede each verse, punctuating the two-part beat rather nicely." In a mixed review, Ken Capobianco writing for The Boston Globe said, "The major label debut from LA's Kid Ink finds the MC taking his own lane right into the pop mainstream and it's not a smooth ride. Ink mostly relies on a nasal singsong flow that, too often, accidentally detours into monotony over slickly produced club beats borrowed from better sources. Hip-hop is so saturated with songs about women and partying, Ink's additions to the hey-ho hedonism become wearying."

== Commercial performance ==
The album debuted at number three on the US Billboard 200 chart, with first-week sales of 50,000 copies in the United States. In its second week, the album dropped to number 21 on the chart and sold 14,000 more copies bringing its total album sales to 65,000 in the United States. In its third week, the album sold 8,200 more copies in the United States. In its fourth week, the album sold 6,100 copies in the United States. As of February 2015, the album has sold 179,000 copies in the United States.

In 2014, My Own Lane was ranked as the 138th most popular album of the year on the Billboard 200.

== Track listing ==
Standard edition
No.	Title	Writer(s)	Producer(s)	Length
1.	"Hello World"	Brian Todd Collins; Muriel Baroty; Joe Khajadourian; Michael Maller; Alex Schwartz	The Futuristics	3:25
2.	"The Movement"	Collins; Marcella Araica; Nate Hills; David Foster; Maurice White; Allee Willis	Danja	3:30
3.	"Show Me" (featuring Chris Brown)	Collins; Chris Brown; Christian Jones; Dijon McFarlane; Jeremih Felton; Mikely Adam; Allen George; Craig McFarlane	DJ Mustard	3:37
4.	"Iz U Down" (featuring Tyga)	Collins; Michael "Mike DZL" Holmes; Michael Ray Nguyen-Stevenson	Mike DZL	3:55
5.	"We Just Came to Party" (featuring August Alsina)	Collins; Kevin Cossom; Andrew Harr; Jermaine Jackson; Sean McMillion; Ralph Jeanty	The Runners	3:54
6.	"Main Chick" (featuring Chris Brown)	Collins; Brown; Felton; D. McFarlane; Glenda Proby	DJ Mustard	3:17
7.	"No Option" (featuring King Los)	Collins; Holmes; Carlos Coleman	Mike DZL	3:29
8.	"Murda" (featuring Pusha T)	Collins; Lasanna Harris; Sham "Sak Pase" Joseph; Terrence Thornton	Joseph; Harris	3:37
9.	"Rollin'"	Collins; D. McFarlane; Eric Bellinger	DJ Mustard	3:13
10.	"Tattoo of My Name"	Collins; Jeremy McArthur; Mikhail Cronin	Arthur McArthur; Cronin	3:28
11.	"No Miracles" (featuring Elle Varner and Machine Gun Kelly)	Collins; Richard Colson Baker; Yoan Chirescu; Joseph; Raphaël Jurdin; Chantal Kreviazuk; Pierre-Antoine Melki; Demonté Posey	soFLY and Nius; Joseph	4:36
12.	"I Don't Care" (featuring Maejor Ali)	Collins; Larrance Dopson; Brandon Green; Carl McCormick	Dopson (of 1500 or Nothin'); Cardiak	4:02
13.	"More Than a King"	Collins; Ned Cameron; David "The Optimist" Embree	Cameron; The Optimist	3:32

Deluxe edition (bonus tracks)
No.	Title	Writer(s)	Producer(s)	Length
14.	"Star Player"	Collins; Kenneth Coby	SoundZ	3:45
15.	"My System"	Collins; Khalief "KB" Brown; Marcus "M-Millz" Mills	KB; M-Millz	3:48
16.	"Money and the Power"	Collins; Cameron	N4; Cameron; Jonathan Lauture	3:27
17.	"Bad Ass" (featuring Meek Mill and Wale)	Collins; Robert Williams; Olubowale Akintimehin	Devin Cruise	4:58
18.	"Bossin' Up" (featuring A$AP Ferg and French Montana)	Collins; Darold Ferguson; Karim Kharbouch	Lifted	6:50

Sample credits

- "The Movement" contains a sample from "Let Your Feelings Show", as performed by Earth, Wind & Fire.

== Personnel ==
Credits for My Own Lane adapted from AllMusic.

- August Alsina – featured artist
- Matt Anthony – assistant
- Marcella Araica – mixing
- Paul Bowman – assistant
- Chris Brown – featured artist
- Ned Cameron – producer
- Cardiak – producer
- Adam Catania – assistant
- Yoan Chirescu – guitar
- Danja – producer
- DJ Ill Will – executive producer
- Larrance Dopson – producer
- Mike DZL – producer
- The Futuristics – producer
- Erwin Gorostiza – creative director
- Lasanna Harris – producer
- J Grand – arranger, executive producer, mixing
- Jess Jackson – vocal engineer
- Jaycen Joshua – mixing
- Sham "Sak Pase" Joseph – producer
- Ryan Kaul – assistant
- Kid Ink – primary artist
- King Los – featured artist
- Dave Kutch – mastering
- Erik Madrid – mixing
- Maejor Ali – featured artist
- Arthur McArthur – producer
- Dijon McFarlane – producer
- MGK – featured artist
- Mikhail – producer
- Nius – producer
- The Optimist – producer
- Estevan Oriol – photography
- Pusha T – featured artist
- Angel Ramirez Jr. – engineer, mixing
- David Royer – stylist
- James Royo – mixing
- The Runners – producer
- SoFLY – producer
- Brian Springer – vocal engineer
- Rob Suchecki – engineer
- Tyga – featured artist
- Elle Varner – featured artist
- Jeff "Supa Jeff" Villanueva – editing
- Courtney Walter – art direction, design

== Charts ==
=== Weekly charts ===
Chart (2014)	Peak position
Australian Albums (ARIA)	25
Austrian Albums (Ö3 Austria)	16
Belgian Albums (Ultratop Flanders)	142
Belgian Albums (Ultratop Wallonia)	119
Canadian Albums (Billboard)	10
Dutch Albums (Album Top 100)	61
French Albums (SNEP)	48
German Albums (Offizielle Top 100)	12
Scottish Albums (Official Charts)	68
Swiss Albums (Schweizer Hitparade)	8
UK Albums (Official Charts Company)	34
UK R&B Albums (Official Charts Company)	3
US Billboard 200	3
US Top R&B/Hip-Hop Albums (Billboard)	2

=== Year-end charts ===
Chart (2014)	Position
US Billboard 200	138
US Top R&B/Hip-Hop Albums (Billboard)	25

== Certifications ==
Region	Certification	Certified units/sales
Canada (Music Canada)	Gold	40,000^{‡}
New Zealand (RMNZ)	Gold	7,500^{‡}
United Kingdom (BPI)	Silver	60,000^{‡}
United States (RIAA)	Platinum	1,000,000^{‡}
^{‡} Sales+streaming figures based on certification alone.
