= Ned Cameron =

American record producer

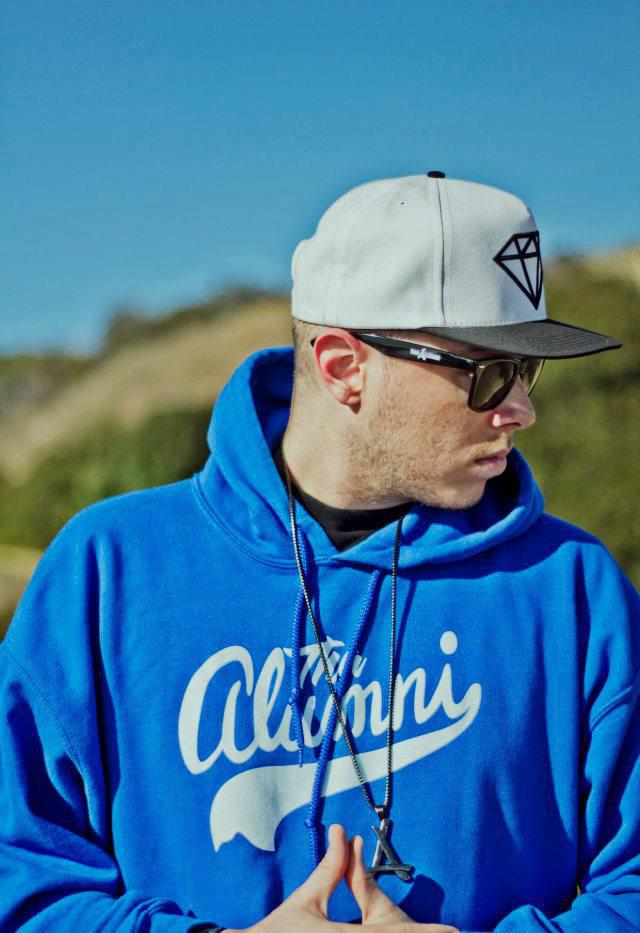
- Cameron in 2012

Background information
- Also known as: Nedro
- Born: Ned Cameron; December 25, 1987 (age 38); San Francisco, California, U.S.
- Genres: Hip hop; country
- Occupations: Record producer, songwriter
- Years active: 2010–present
- Labels: Taperoom; Warner/Chappell Music; Tha Alumni

Ned Cameron is an American record producer from San Francisco, California. He is best known for his work with American rapper Kid Ink, having produced his 2012 songs "Hell & Back" and "Time of Your Life", as well as his 2013 single "Money and the Power".

== Career ==
In the early 2000s, Cameron began his career at DJ Ill Will's record label, Tha Alumni Music Group. Working closely with American rapper and labelmate Kid Ink, Cameron produced his single "I Just Want It All" from Kid Ink's Daydreamer mixtape in late 2011, followed by Kid Ink's single, "Time of Your Life" in 2012." Cameron also produced "Walk In The Club" and "Hell & Back" on Kid Ink's debut studii album Up & Away. He then joined Tha Alumni Music Group in February, 2012.

After co-producing DJ Felli Fel's 2013 single "Reason To Hate" featuring Ne-Yo, Tyga, and Wiz Khalifa, Cameron produced "Money and the Power" and "Sunset" on Kid Ink’s major label debut, Almost Home. He produced "More Than A King" from Kid Ink’s second studio album, My Own Lane. Cameron also produced "Story of the Stairs" for Machine Gun Kelly, as well as Wiz Khalifa's 2014 song "Hope".

Cameron did not resurface until December 2023, when he signed a publishing deal with Ashley Gorley and Warner Chappell. He subsequently wrote Morgan Wallen's “Jack And Jill”, as well as writing songs for other country artists including Cole Swindell, Parmalee, Tucker Wetmore, Brantley Gilbert, Chase Matthew.

== Production discography ==
Title	Year	Artist(s)	Album
"I Just Want It All"	2011	Kid Ink	Daydreamer
"When I Sleep"	2011	Lil Wayne (featuring Kid Ink and Ned Cameron)	—N/a
"Time of Your Life"	2012	Kid Ink	Up & Away
"Walk In the Club"	2012	Kid Ink	Up & Away
"Hell & Back"	2012	Kid Ink	Up & Away
"Time of Your Life" (Remix)	2012	Kid Ink (featuring Chris Brown and Tyga)	—N/a
"Hell & Back" (Remix)	2012	Kid Ink (featuring Machine Gun Kelly)	—N/a
"Reasons to Hate"	2013	DJ Felli Fel (featuring Ne-Yo, Tyga and Wiz Khalifa)	—N/a
"Money and the Power"	2013	Kid Ink	Almost Home
"Sunset"	2013	Kid Ink	Almost Home
"More Than a King"	2014	Kid Ink	My Own Lane
"Hope"	2014	Wiz Khalifa (featuring Ty Dolla Sign)	Blacc Hollywood
"Every City We Go"	2015	Kid Ink (featuring Migos)	Full Speed
"Wait Up"	2015	Sean Kingston	—N/a
"Story Of The Stairs"	2015	Machine Gun Kelly	General Admission
"God Talkin"	2025	Maddox Batson	First Dance
"Dirty Dancing"	2025	Cole Swindell	Spanish Moss
"Feels Like Home"	2025	Parmalee	Feels Like Home
"Jack And Jill"	2025	Morgan Wallen	I'm The Problem
