= WrestleMania 31 =

2015 WWE pay-per-view and livestreaming event

- Promotional poster featuring Brock Lesnar, Roman Reigns, John Cena, Triple H, Sting, Daniel Bryan, and The Undertaker
- Promotion: WWE
- Date: March 29, 2015
- City: Santa Clara, California
- Venue: Levi's Stadium
- Attendance: 67,000
- Buy rate: 259,000 (excluding WWE Network views)

WWE event chronology
← Previous; Fastlane	Next → Extreme Rules

WrestleMania chronology
← Previous; XXX	Next → 32

WrestleMania 31 was a 2015 professional wrestling pay-per-view (PPV) and livestreaming event produced by WWE. It was the 31st annual WrestleMania and took place on March 29, 2015, at Levi's Stadium in the San Francisco Bay Area city of Santa Clara, California. This was the last WrestleMania to be held in March, as all WrestleMania events since have been held in April.

Nine matches were contested at the event, including two matches on the Kickoff pre-show. In the main event, Seth Rollins cashed in his Money in the Bank contract as the scheduled main event match between defending champion Brock Lesnar and Roman Reigns was in progress, and won the resulting impromptu triple threat match to win the WWE World Heavyweight Championship by pinning Reigns. In other prominent matches, The Undertaker (in his first on-screen appearance since the previous year's event) defeated Bray Wyatt while John Cena defeated Rusev to win the WWE United States Championship. The event was also notable for Sting's debut match in WWE, as well as his only WrestleMania match, in which he was defeated by Triple H.

Despite criticism for its build-up, WrestleMania 31 received highly positive reviews from fans and critics; some critics called it one of the greatest WrestleManias of all time. Praise was directed to the quality of matches, the conclusion to the main event and focused match card, although the women's tag team match was subject to criticism for being seen as "filler" and Triple H's win over Sting was criticised as an unnecessary ode to WWE winning the Monday Night War. WWE reported that the show was the highest grossing WWE event ever at the time, drawing a revenue of US$12.6 million. The company also claimed an attendance figure of 76,976. This was also the first WrestleMania to incorporate WWE's current logo that was originally used for the WWE Network that launched in February 2014.

== Production ==
=== Background ===
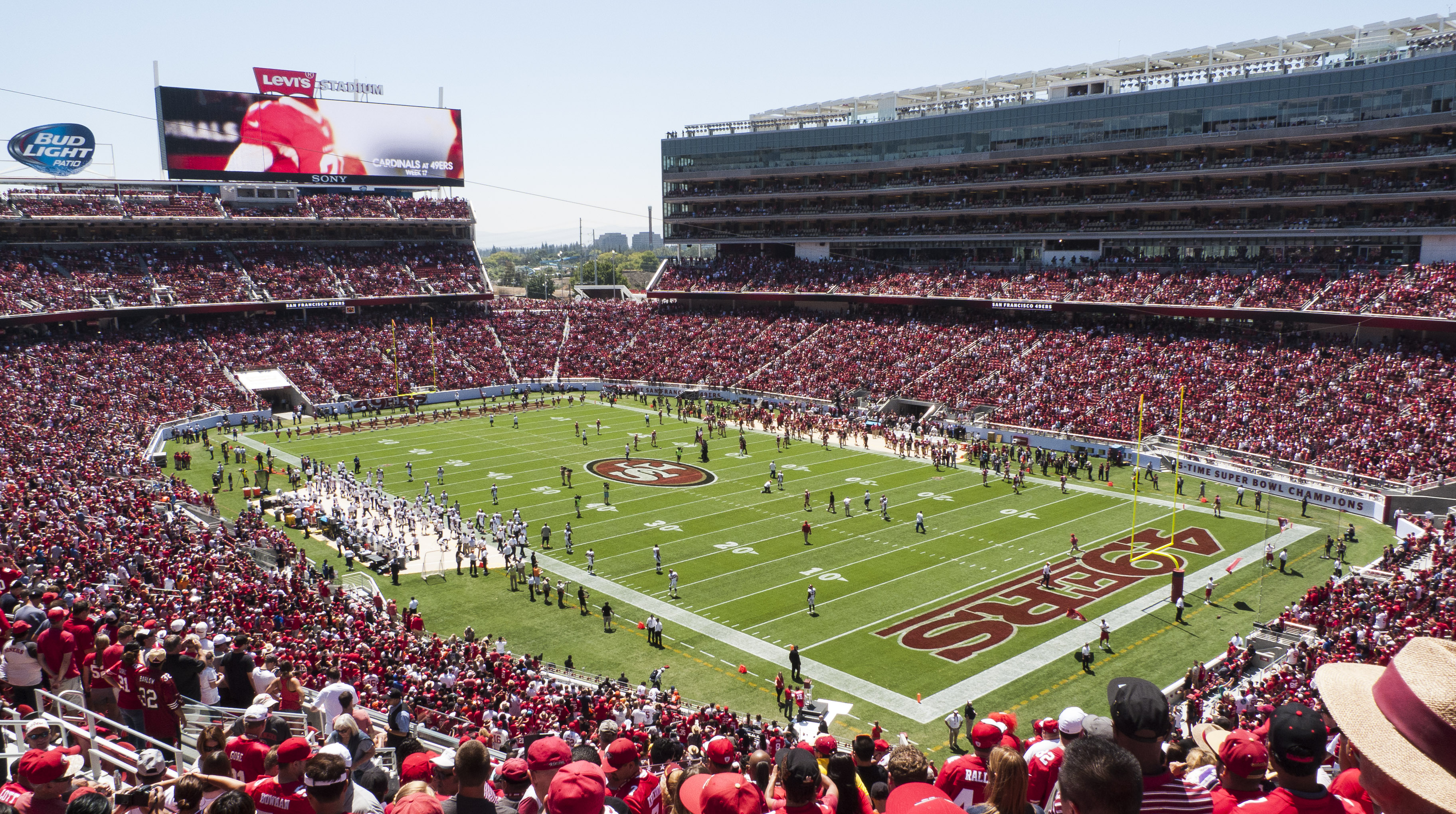
The 31st annual WrestleMania was held at Levi's Stadium in Santa Clara, California.

WrestleMania is WWE's flagship professional wrestling pay-per-view (PPV) and livestreaming event, having first been held in 1985. It was the company's first pay-per-view produced and was also WWE's first major event available via livestreaming when the company launched the WWE Network in February 2014. It is the longest-running professional wrestling event in history and is held annually between mid-March to mid-April. It was the first of WWE's original four pay-per-views, which includes Royal Rumble, SummerSlam, and Survivor Series, referred to as the "Big Four". The event has been described as the Super Bowl of sports entertainment. Much like the Super Bowl, cities bid for the right to host the year's edition of WrestleMania.

Announced on December 9, 2013, WrestleMania 31 was scheduled to be held on March 29, 2015, at Levi's Stadium in the San Francisco Bay Area city of Santa Clara, California. It was the first WrestleMania event to be held in the San Francisco Bay Area, the sixth to be held in the state of California (after 2, VII, XII, 2000, and 21) and the sixth to be held in an open-air venue (after IX, XXIV, XXVI, XXVIII, and 29).

The logo for the event included a red "play" button. According to a San Jose Mercury News article, Vince McMahon explained that the play button highlighted the technical prowess of Silicon Valley. There were two theme songs for the event. The main theme was "Rise" by David Guetta featuring Skylar Grey, while the secondary theme was "Money and the Power" by Kid Ink. The event included live musical performances from Skylar Grey, Kid Ink, Travis Barker, and Aloe Blacc. Grammy Award winner LL Cool J appeared in the opening video package for the event.

Travel packages for the event went on sale on September 29, 2014, with the exclusive California Dreamin' Travel Package ranging from $5,500. The VIP Package, Platinum Premium Package, Gold Package, and Silver Package were available on October 6 with prices starting from $3,250, $1,650, $1,150, and $900, respectively, including tickets to WrestleMania, hotel accommodation, airfare, and other activities through WrestleMania Axxess. Individual tickets went on sale on November 15, ranging from $35 to $1,000.

=== Storylines ===
The event comprised nine matches, including two on the Kickoff pre-show, that resulted from scripted storylines. Results were predetermined by WWE's writers, while storylines were produced on WWE's weekly television shows, Raw and SmackDown.

==== Main event match ====
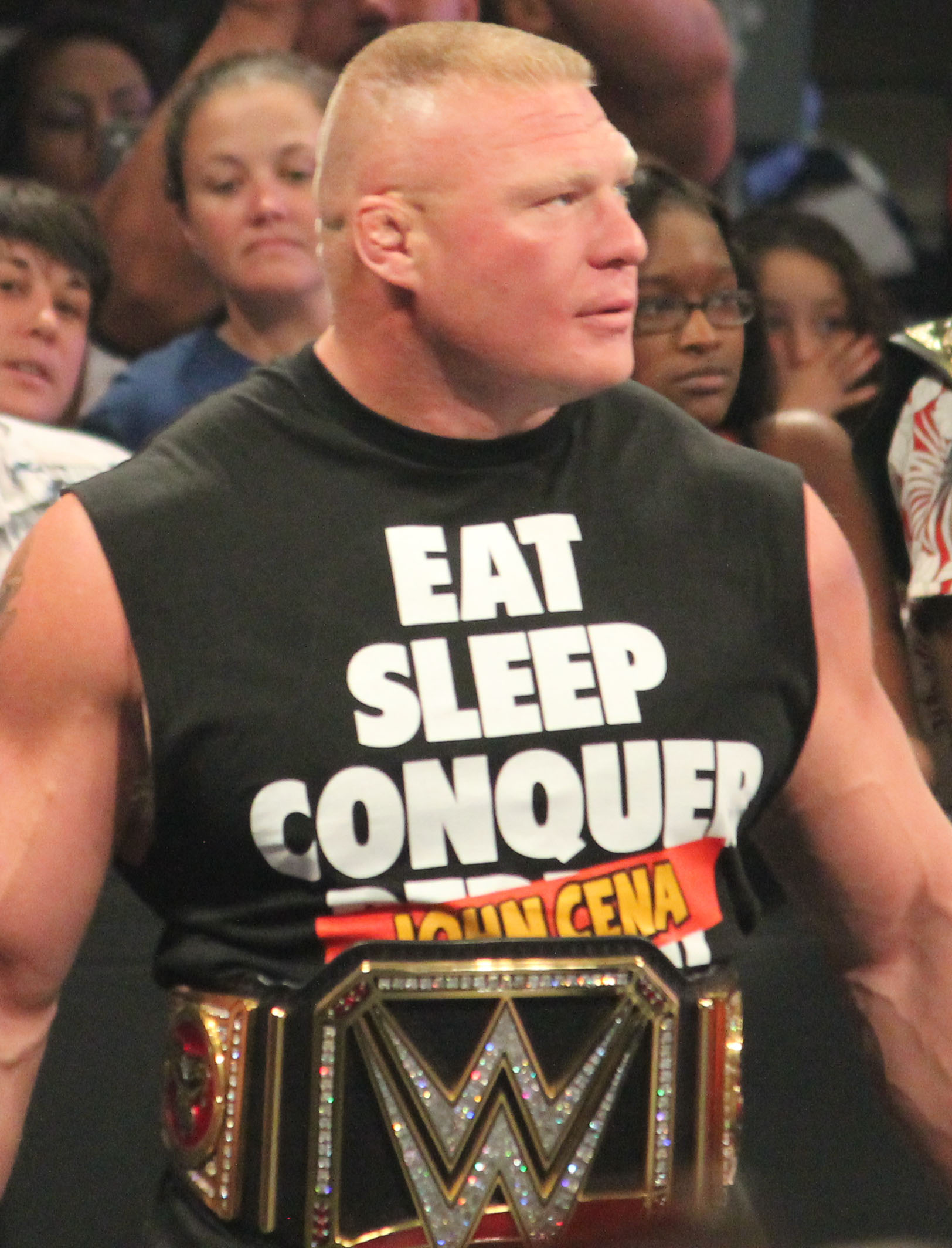
Brock Lesnar was scheduled to defend his WWE World Heavyweight Championship against Roman Reigns in the main event.

At the Royal Rumble, Brock Lesnar successfully defended his WWE World Heavyweight Championship against John Cena and Seth Rollins in a triple threat match. Rollins also held the Money in the Bank briefcase, guaranteeing him a future title match at a time of his choosing. Later that night, the Royal Rumble match was won by Roman Reigns, making him the #1 contender for Lesnar's title at WrestleMania. However, the reaction to his victory was overwhelmingly negative, much of it due to the early elimination of fan-favorite Daniel Bryan. On the February 2 episode of Raw, in response to this, Reigns agreed to put his WrestleMania title shot on the line in a match at Fastlane. Later in the night, Bryan defeated Rollins to face Reigns at the event. At Fastlane, Reigns defeated Bryan to remain the #1 contender for Lesnar’s title, enraging the fans even more. From then until WrestleMania, Reigns had only two face-to-face interactions with Lesnar, with critics describing his title match as "being built on whether or not he is even worthy of being in the match in the first place". Reigns was also described as having "experienced no adversity on his journey", as he "chatted with (Lesnar's manager) Paul Heyman one week, got a shirt and then, played tug o' war" with Lesnar (a reference to the final in-ring confrontation between Lesnar and Reigns on the March 23 episode of Raw in which the two grappled with the WWE World Heavyweight Championship belt). It was acknowledged in the storyline that Lesnar's contract was set to expire not long after WrestleMania, but less than a week before the event, amid speculation that he would be returning to UFC, Lesnar signed a new WWE contract and retired from MMA.

==== Undercard matches ====
On the March 2 episode of Raw, Paige defeated Divas Champion Nikki Bella by disqualification in a title match after Brie Bella attacked Paige; therefore, Nikki retained the title. Brie and Nikki then continued to attack Paige in the ring until AJ Lee returned from injury and saved Paige. On the March 5 episode of SmackDown, AJ defeated Brie after Paige kept Nikki from interfering in the match. On March 9, AJ and Paige were scheduled to face The Bellas at WrestleMania.

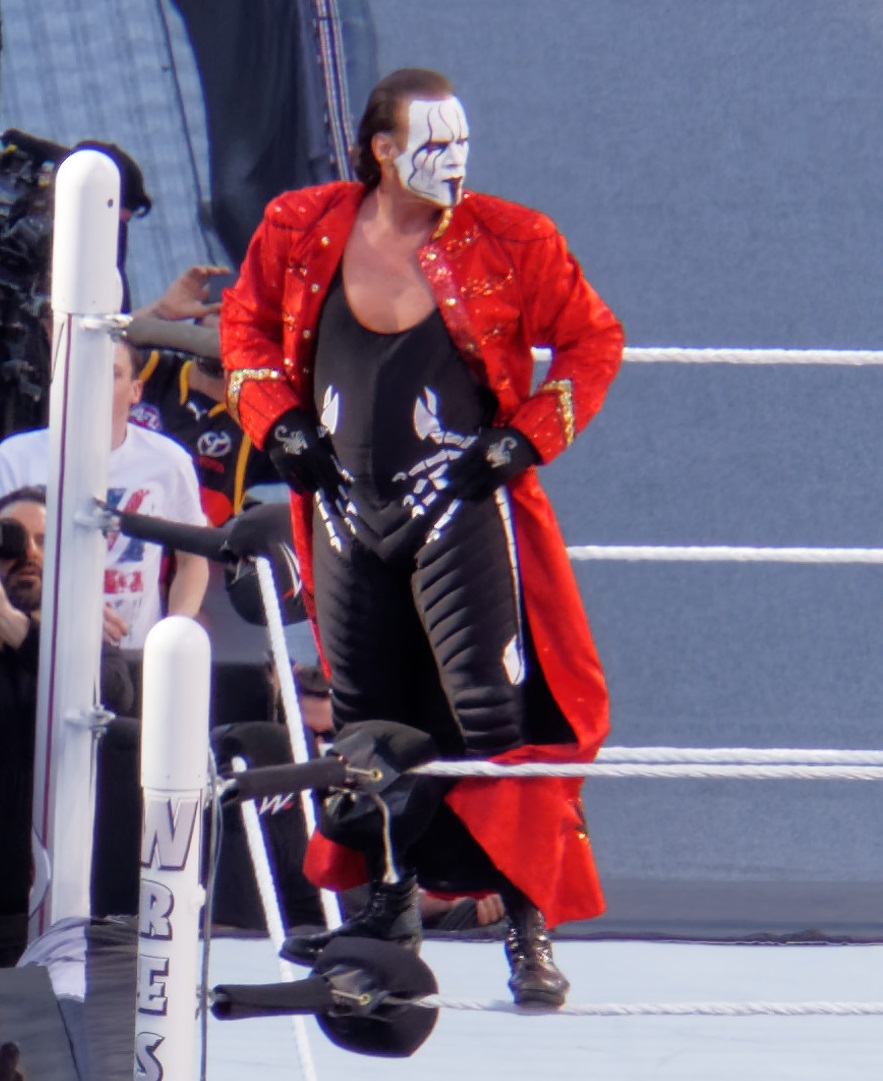
Sting's debut match in WWE resulted in a loss to Triple H.

At Survivor Series, Sting made his first WWE appearance in the main event Survivor Series elimination match, attacking Triple H and aiding Dolph Ziggler in pinning Seth Rollins, giving Team Cena the win and causing The Authority to be out of power, which was a secondary stipulation of the match. On the January 19 episode of Raw, Sting made his Raw debut, appearing backstage during the main event, a 3-on-1 handicap match between Cena and the team of Big Show, Kane, and Rollins. The lights in the arena darkened as Sting entered the stage and gestured to The Authority at ringside. The distraction allowed Cena to pin Rollins for the win, which reinstated the jobs of the recently (kayfabe) fired Ziggler, Ryback, and Erick Rowan. On January 26, Triple H challenged Sting to a "face-to-face" confrontation at Fastlane. On the February 9 episode of Raw, Triple H again called Sting out to accept his challenge. The lights went out, and a group of Sting impersonators appeared around the arena and inside the ring, illuminated by spotlights, while a video message of Sting accepting Triple H's challenge played on the TitanTron. At Fastlane, the two brawled until Sting got control of Triple H. Sting then pointed to the WrestleMania sign in the rafters with his signature baseball bat, issuing a challenge, which Triple H accepted. Later that night, the match was confirmed.

On the February 23 episode of Raw, a second annual André the Giant Memorial Battle Royal was scheduled for WrestleMania. Over the following month, The Miz, Curtis Axel, Ryback, Fandango, Adam Rose, Zack Ryder, Jack Swagger, Titus O'Neil, Darren Young, Big Show, Kane, Erick Rowan, Sin Cara, Damien Mizdow, Goldust, Heath Slater, Mark Henry, and The Ascension were announced as participants. On March 26, the match was set for the Kickoff pre-show. That same day, Hideo Itami won a NXT tournament at WrestleMania Axxess to earn a spot in the match.

On February 26, Intercontinental Champion Bad News Barrett was scheduled to defend his title in a multiple-man ladder match at the event, in which a storyline was made when several contenders stole the title, claiming that they won it. Between the March 2 episode of Raw and the March 12 episode of SmackDown, R-Truth, Dean Ambrose, Luke Harper, Dolph Ziggler, Stardust, and Daniel Bryan were added to the match.

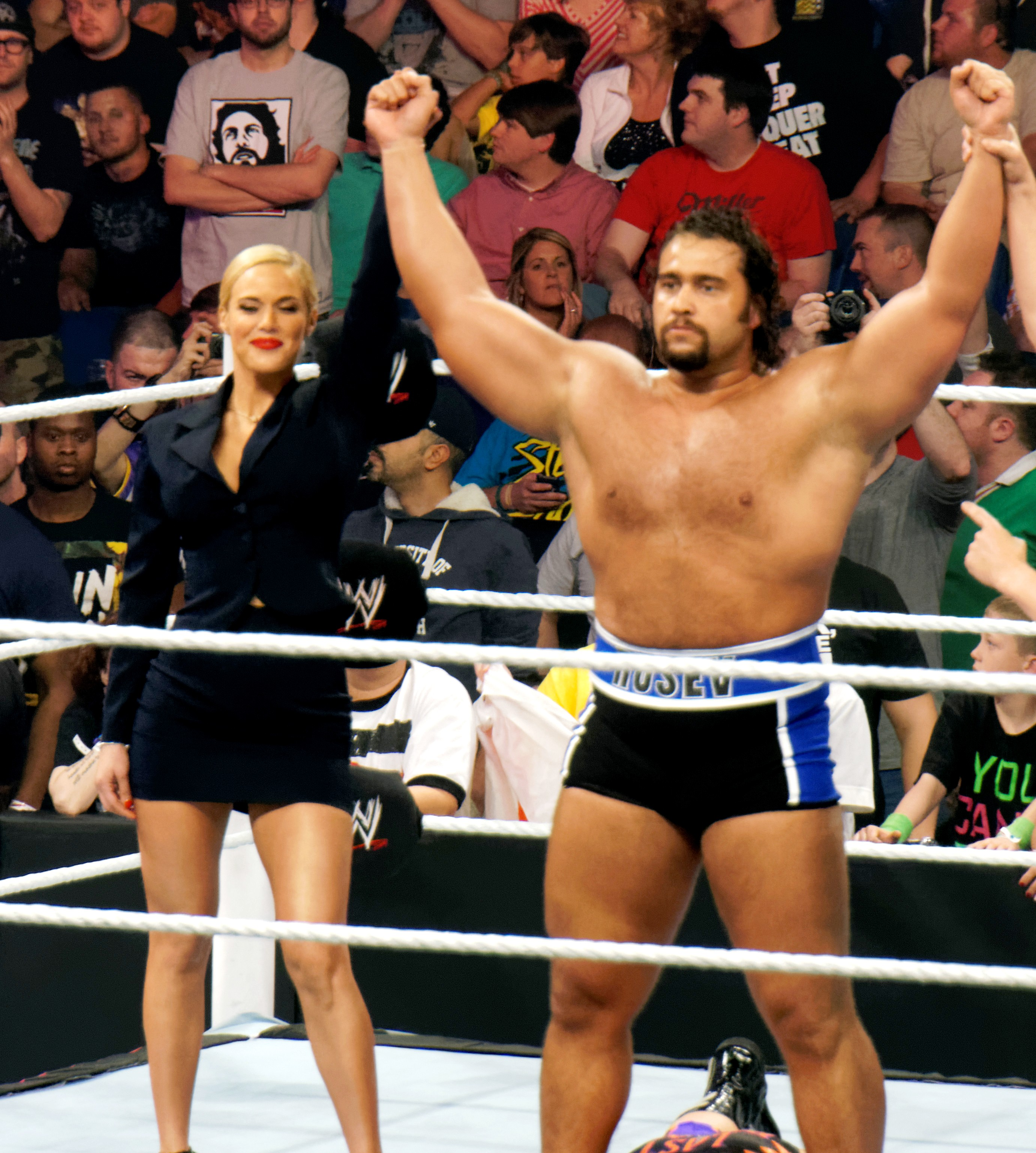
In his WrestleMania debut, Rusev lost the United States Championship to John Cena in his first pinfall loss since he debuted on WWE's main roster the previous year.

At Fastlane, Rusev defeated John Cena to retain the United States Championship after hitting Cena with a low blow (while the referee was distracted with Lana) and making him pass out to the Accolade submission hold. In the following weeks, Cena challenged Rusev to a rematch, which Rusev declined. On the March 2 episode of Raw, Stephanie McMahon decreed that Cena would not compete at WrestleMania unless Rusev agreed to a match. On the March 9 episode of Raw, after Rusev defeated Curtis Axel, Rusev made several insulting remarks towards the US, drawing the ire of Cena. Following the insults, Cena went into the ring and placed Rusev in the STF submission hold until Rusev passed out. Cena then picked up a bottle of water, used it to revive Rusev and then placed him into the STF again. Although Rusev submitted, Cena refused to break the hold until Lana granted Cena a title rematch at WrestleMania on Rusev's behalf.

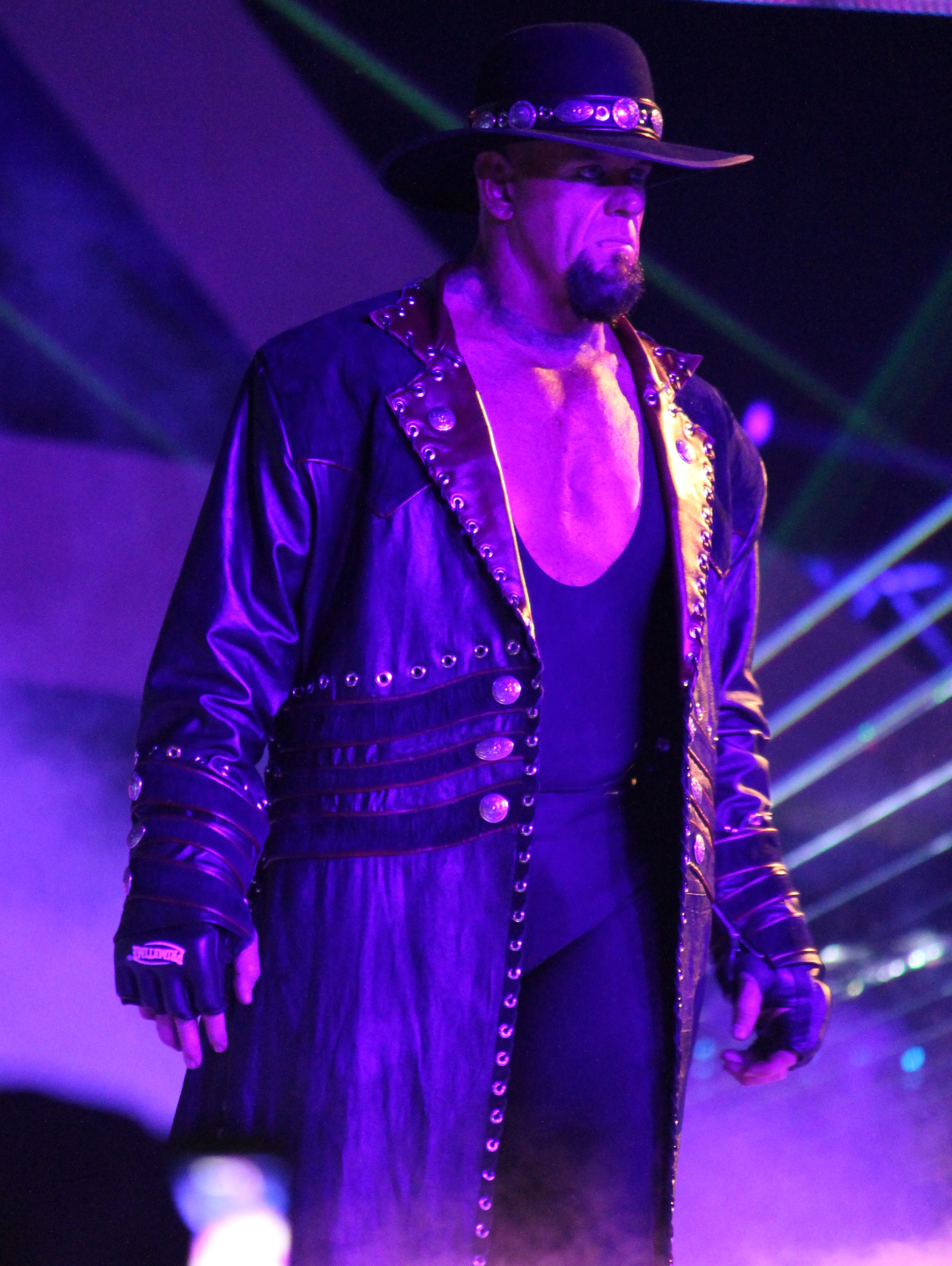
The Undertaker wrestled Bray Wyatt at WrestleMania in his first appearance since losing to Brock Lesnar at the previous year's event.

At Fastlane, Bray Wyatt challenged The Undertaker to a match at WrestleMania after sending messages to the Undertaker weeks prior. On the March 9 episode of Raw, The Undertaker accepted Wyatt's challenge to a match at the event.

On the October 20 episode of Raw, The Authority members Randy Orton, Kane, and Seth Rollins defeated Cena and Ambrose in a 3-on-2 handicap street fight. Immediately after the match, Rollins performed a Curb Stomp on Orton after dissension between the two. On the October 27 episode of Raw, Orton performed an RKO on Rollins, thus directly defying The Authority's orders. On the November 3 episode of Raw, after increasing frustration, Orton attacked Rollins during his Intercontinental Championship match against Ziggler. Orton then demanded a match with Rollins to settle their dispute, which Triple H granted in order to keep Orton on The Authority's side. Rollins won the match, and Orton then attacked the Authority before Rollins Curb Stomped him, causing a (kayfabe) injury which forced Orton to miss several months of competition. At Fastlane, Orton returned to WWE and attacked The Authority. Over the next weeks, Orton teased a renewed alliance with The Authority, before attacking Rollins after a handicap match against Reigns. On the March 12 episode of SmackDown, Orton challenged Rollins to a match at WrestleMania. On the March 16 episode of Raw, Rollins accepted the challenge.

At Fastlane, Tyson Kidd and Cesaro (with Natalya) defeated The Usos (Jey Uso and Jimmy Uso) (with Naomi) to win the WWE Tag Team Championship. On March 23, the new champions were scheduled to defend their titles against Los Matadores (Diego and Fernando) (with El Torito), The New Day (Kofi Kingston and Big E) (with Xavier Woods), and The Usos in a fatal four-way tag team match on the WrestleMania 31 Kickoff pre-show.

== Event ==
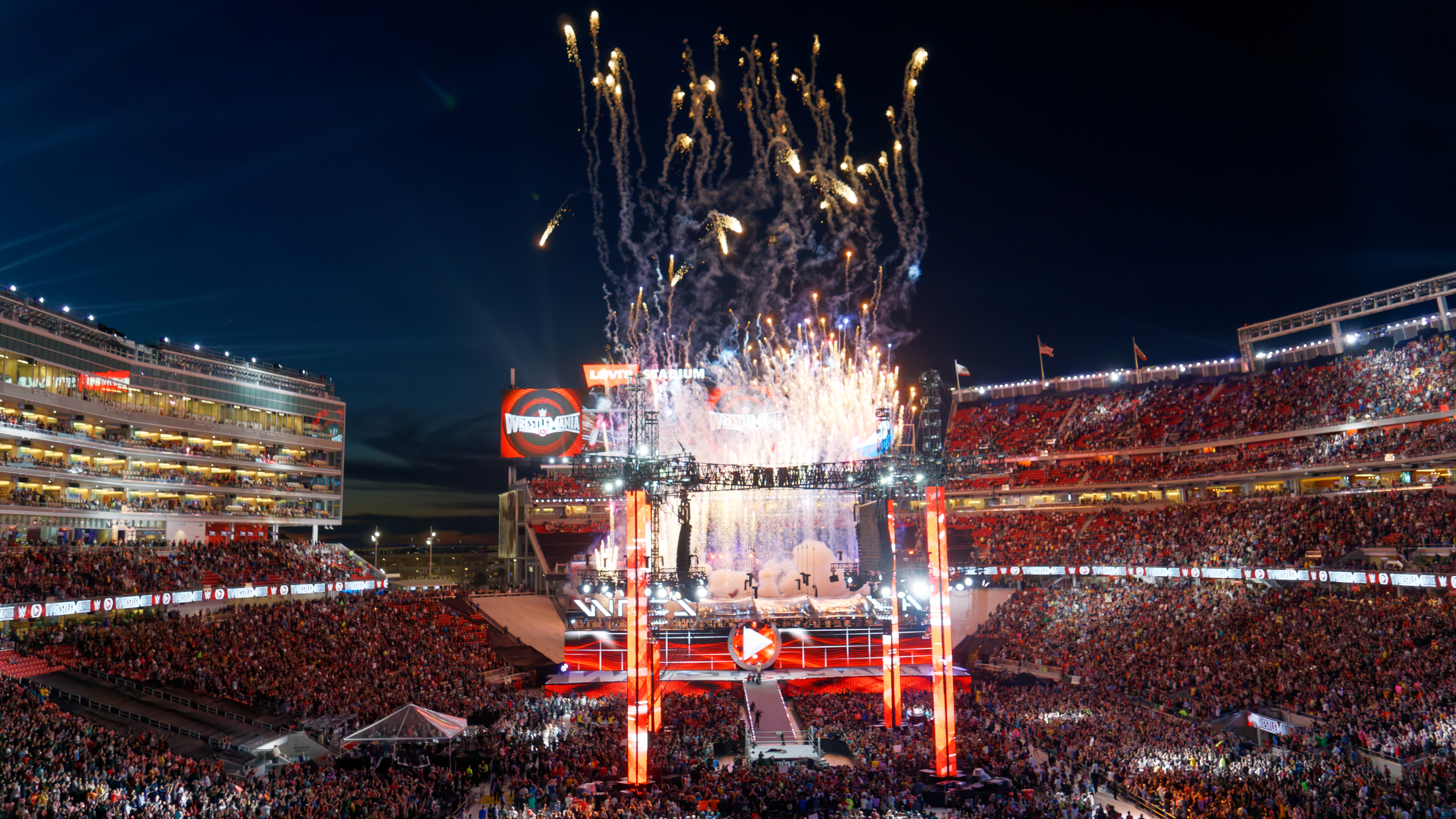
Levi's Stadium during WrestleMania 31

Other on-screen personnel
Role:	Name:
English commentators	Michael Cole
English commentators	Jerry Lawler
English commentators	John "Bradshaw" Layfield
Spanish commentators	Carlos Cabrera
Spanish commentators	Marcelo Rodriguez
French commentators	Philippe Chéreau
French commentators	Christophe Agius
Interviewer	Tom Phillips
Ring announcer	Lillian Garcia
Ring announcer	Eden Stiles
Referees	Mike Chioda
Referees	John Cone
Referees	Charles Robinson
Referees	Dan Engler
Referees	Darrick Moore
Referees	Ryan Tran
Referees	Chad Patton
Pre-show Panel	Renee Young
Pre-show Panel	Booker T
Pre-show Panel	Corey Graves
Pre-show Panel	Byron Saxton

=== Broadcasters ===
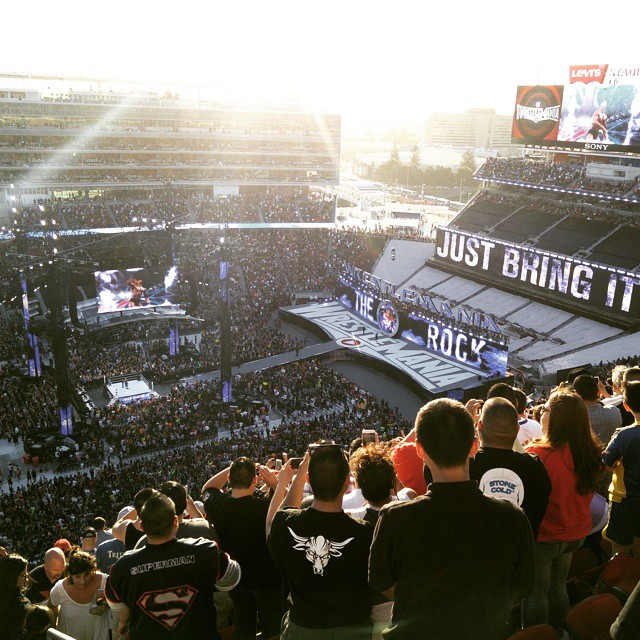
WrestleMania 31 set during The Rock's entrance

The WrestleMania 31 Kickoff Show was hosted by Renee Young, with Booker T, Corey Graves, and Byron Saxton as analysts, while Tom Phillips and Lita served as social media correspondents. English commentators for the event were Michael Cole, Jerry Lawler, and John "Bradshaw" Layfield. Spanish, German, French, and Italian commentators also called the matches at ringside. Lilian Garcia and Eden Stiles served as the ring announcers.

=== Celebrities ===
As is tradition, WrestleMania featured numerous appearances by celebrity guests – such as E! News host Maria Menounos, who served as a backstage interviewer. The pay-per-view broadcast was opened by Aloe Blacc performing "America the Beautiful". The event saw another musical performance as Skylar Grey, Travis Barker, and Kid Ink performed a medley of the two WrestleMania 31 theme songs – "Rise" and "Money and the Power". Arnold Schwarzenegger also was featured at the event, first as part of the Terminator Genisys themed grand entrance of Triple H, and later being recognized as part of the 2015 WWE Hall of Fame class as a celebrity wing inductee.

=== Pre-show ===
Two matches were contested on the WrestleMania Kickoff pre-show. The first was a fatal four-way tag team match for the WWE Tag Team Championship between the champions Tyson Kidd and Cesaro (with Natalya), The New Day (Kofi Kingston and Big E) (with Xavier Woods), Los Matadores (Diego and Fernando) (with El Torito), and The Usos (Jey Uso and Jimmy Uso) (with Naomi). Kidd and Cesaro retained their titles after Big E suffered a Samoan splash from Jimmy Uso, followed by Cesaro throwing Uso out of the ring and scoring the pin. Also of note, Jey Uso would suffer a shoulder injury during the match, putting him out of action for several months.

The second pre-show match was the second annual Andre the Giant Memorial Battle Royal. Big Show won the 30-man contest by last eliminating Damian Mizdow.

=== Preliminary matches ===
The actual pay-per-view opened with the seven-man ladder match for the Intercontinental Championship where champion Bad News Barrett defended the title against Daniel Bryan, R-Truth, Dean Ambrose, Luke Harper, Dolph Ziggler, and Stardust. Bryan won the match after he and Ziggler exchanged headbutts at the top of the ladder, causing Ziggler to fall backward and allowing Bryan to claim his first Intercontinental Championship.

Next, Seth Rollins faced Randy Orton. During the match, both men kicked out of their finishers. In the climax, Rollins attempted a "Phoenix Splash", but Orton moved out of the way and Rollins countered an "RKO" attempt. As Rollins attempted a second "Curb Stomp", Orton countered by propelling Rollins up into the air and performing a second "RKO" to win the match.

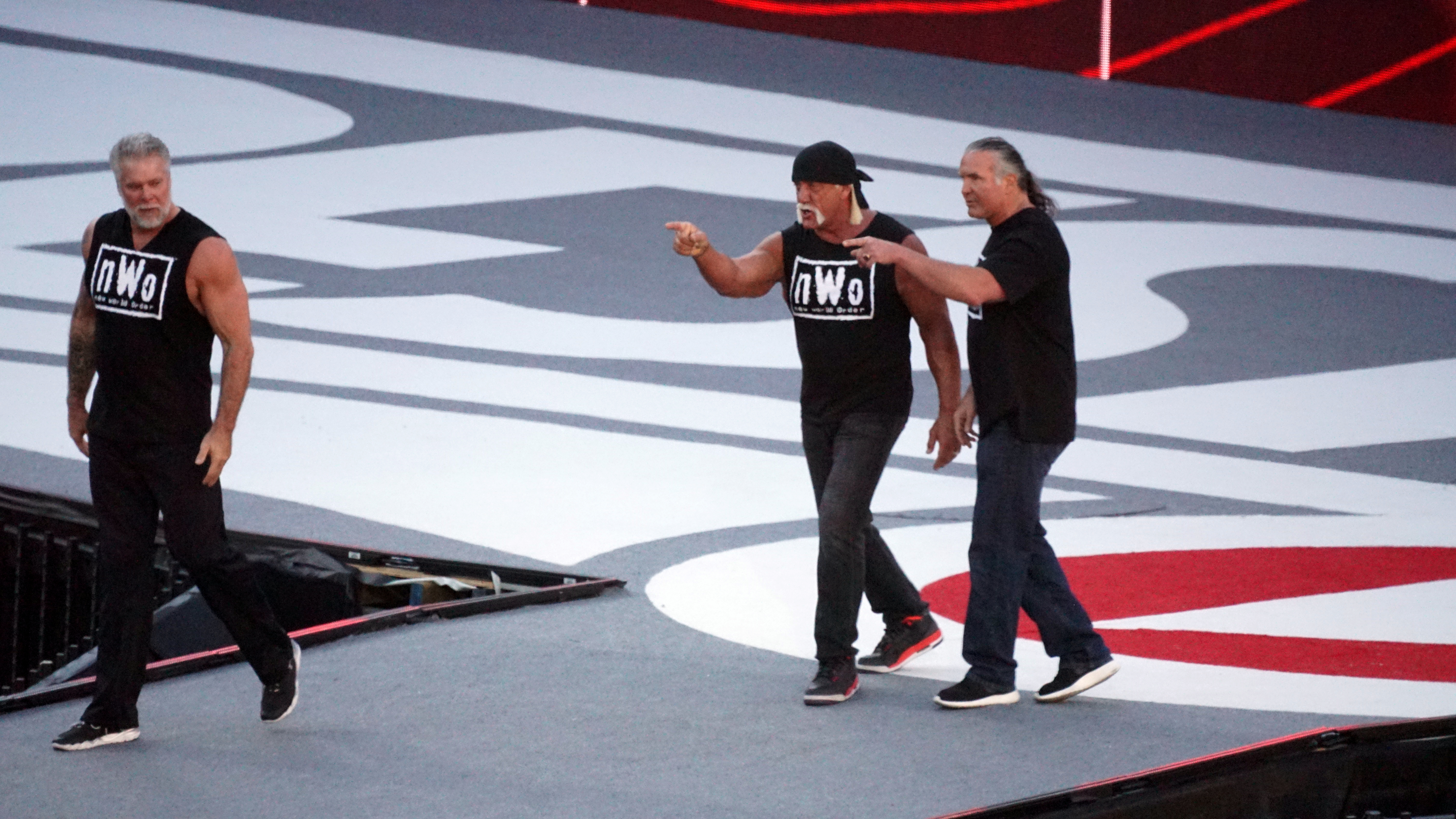
New World Order (nWo) members Kevin Nash (left), Hulk Hogan (center), and Scott Hall (right) making their way to the ring

After that, Sting and Triple H competed in a No Disqualification match. This was Sting's first official match in WWE. Midway through the match, Sting locked Triple H in his Scorpion Death Lock submission hold, which prompted Triple H's D-Generation X (DX) allies to enter the ring and attempt to interfere in the match. Sting knocked down Billy Gunn, Road Dogg, and X-Pac, countered Triple H's Pedigree and threw him to the outside, and then launched himself from the top rope onto all four men. Triple H then performed a Pedigree on Sting for a near-fall and retrieved a sledgehammer from under the ring, which prompted the three original New World Order (nWo) members (Hulk Hogan, Kevin Nash, and Scott Hall) to interfere on Sting's behalf. The nWo members took out DX and Sting dropped Triple H with his Scorpion Death Drop for a near-fall. Sting then locked Triple H in another Scorpion Death Lock. Triple H tried to grab his sledgehammer, but Hogan pulled it out of his reach, causing another brawl between both factions while Triple H was still locked in Sting's submission hold. Shawn Michaels then appeared and executed Sweet Chin Music on Sting. Triple H went to pin Sting only for Sting to kick out. Triple H grabbed his sledgehammer from Gunn, while Hall tossed a Baseball Bat to Sting. A standoff ensued between Triple H and Sting as they both held weapons. Sting struck Triple H in the gut with his bat and struck Triple H's sledgehammer which snapped in half. Sting then trapped Triple H in the corner and landed his Stinger Splash. When Sting went for another Stinger Splash, however, Triple H struck Sting with the sledgehammer to win the match. After the match, Triple H and Sting shook hands in the ring while the commentary team speculated that the rivalry between WWE and WCW had finally been put to rest.

Daniel Bryan was then interviewed backstage by Maria Menounos regarding his Intercontinental Championship victory, and was joined in celebration by former Intercontinental Champions Pat Patterson, "Rowdy" Roddy Piper, Ricky "The Dragon" Steamboat, Ric Flair, and Bret Hart, who all congratulated Bryan and joined in a "Yes!" chant together until Ron Simmons briefly interrupted the celebration with his "Damn!" catchphrase.

In the fourth match, The Bella Twins (Brie Bella and Nikki Bella) faced AJ Lee and Paige. Paige and Nikki began the bout. Most of the match saw The Bellas isolating Paige and preventing her from tagging in Lee – who the Bellas would frequently knock off the ring apron onto the floor – until Paige landed a somersault plancha to both Bellas on the outside. Paige finally tagged in Lee, who applied her "Black Widow" hold to Nikki, but Brie saved her sister from defeat. Paige then ran in with a big boot on Brie but was soon pushed outside the ring. Brie tripped Lee as she ran off the ropes, allowing Nikki to perform a Forearm Smash on her for a near-fall. In the climax, Paige slammed Brie into the ring steps, allowing Lee to apply the "Black Widow" on Nikki, who submitted.

After the match, the 2015 Hall of Fame class was introduced; The Bushwhackers, Larry Zbyszko, Alundra Blayze, Tatsumi Fujinami, Rikishi, Arnold Schwarzenegger, and Kevin Nash were presented to the crowd, while posthumous inductees "Macho Man" Randy Savage and Connor "The Crusher" Michalek were represented by family members.

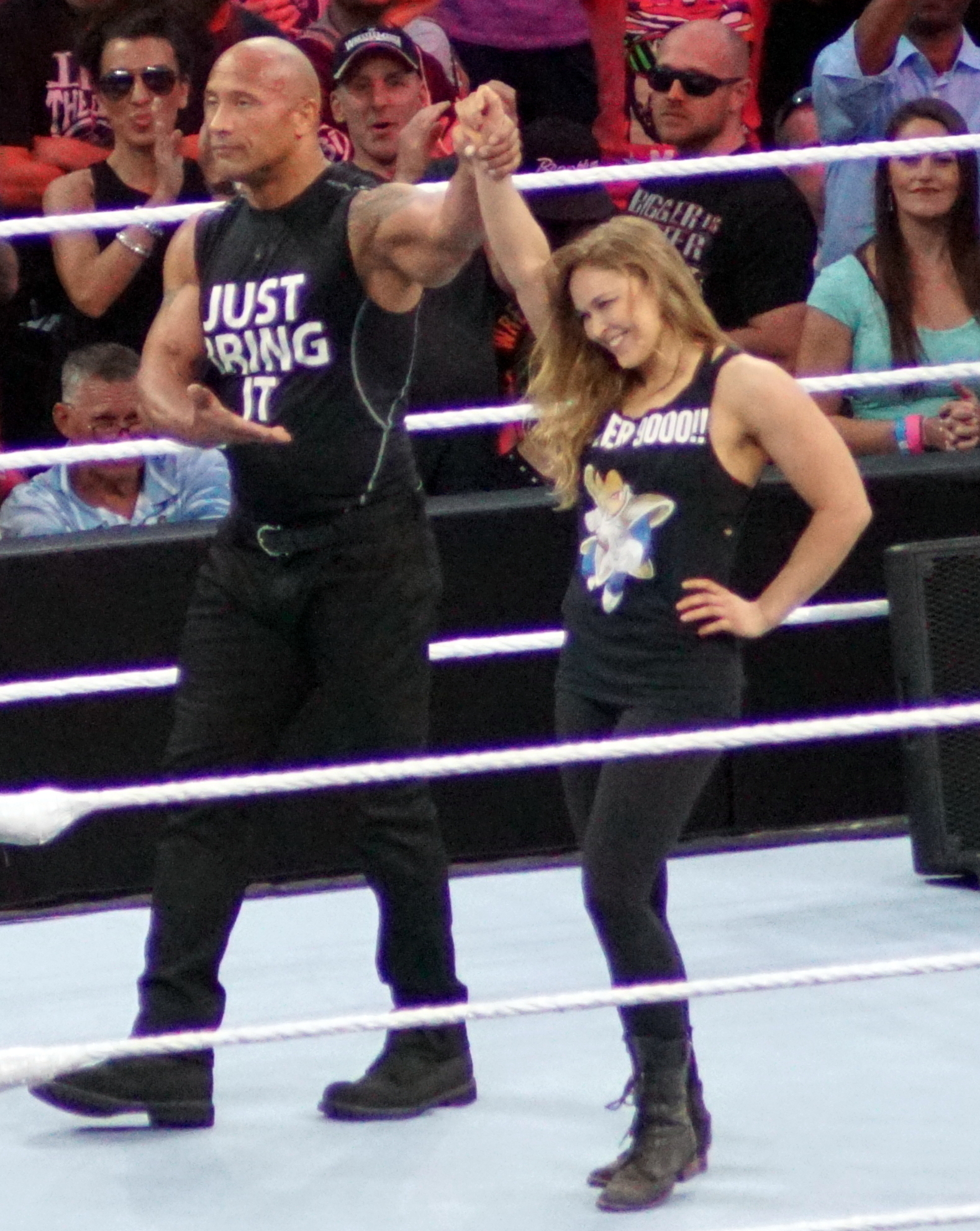
The Rock (left) celebrating with Ronda Rousey (right) after clashing with Stephanie McMahon and Triple H

After that, Rusev (accompanied by Lana) defended the United States Championship against John Cena. Rusev dominated the majority of the match and overpowered Cena throughout, but Cena was able to make a comeback. The end of the match came when Lana climbed onto the ring apron and was accidentally knocked off by Rusev, who then suffered an "Attitude Adjustment" for Cena's pin and the title. This was Rusev's first pinfall loss in WWE since he debuted in the main roster in April 2014.

In the next segment, The Authority (Triple H and Stephanie McMahon) announced that WrestleMania had set a new Levi's Stadium attendance record of 76,976 and began to gloat about their accomplishments and Triple H's victory over Sting earlier in the night, which prompted The Rock to enter the ring. After a verbal exchange, McMahon insulted the Rock and slapped him across the face, taunting that he would not retaliate because he dare not hit a woman. Rock then brought UFC Women's Bantamweight Champion Ronda Rousey (who sat up front) into the ring. After Rousey told McMahon that she "owns every ring she's in" Rock attacked Triple H and Rousey then threw both McMahon and Triple H from the ring, first teasing an armbar on McMahon.

In the penultimate match, The Undertaker faced Bray Wyatt. This was The Undertaker's first appearance since WrestleMania XXX. It was reported that Wyatt legitimately injured his ankle earlier in the day while preparing for the match, resulting in both men working at a slow pace. While Wyatt largely controlled the offense, The Undertaker was able to execute most of his signature moves such as "Old School", the big boot, and "Snake Eyes". Late in the match, Wyatt kicked out of a "Tombstone Piledriver", while The Undertaker kicked out of "Sister Abigail". In the end, The Undertaker executed a second "Tombstone Piledriver" to win the match, extending his record to 22-1.

=== Main event ===
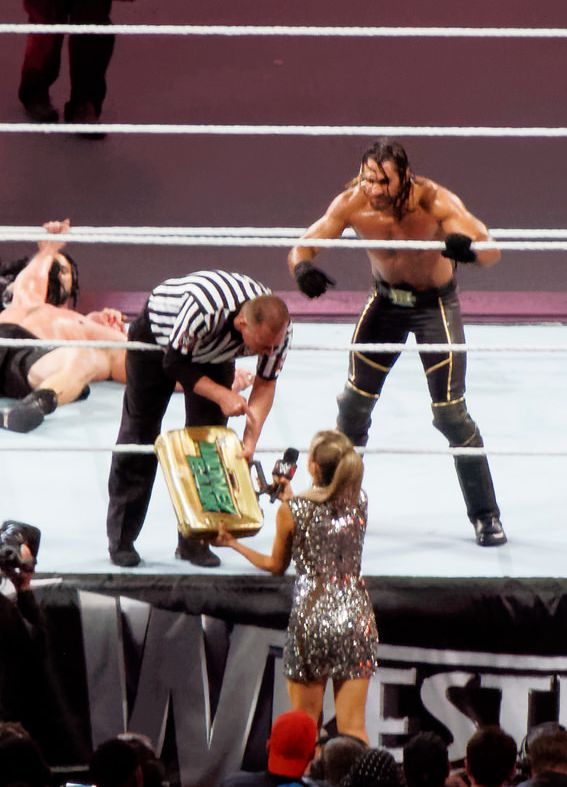
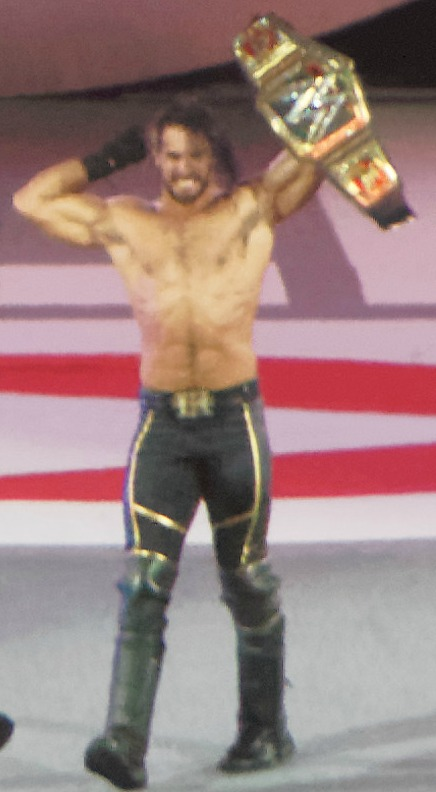
Seth Rollins cashed in his Money in the Bank contract to walk out of WrestleMania 31 as WWE World Heavyweight Champion.

In the main event, Brock Lesnar (with Paul Heyman) defended the WWE World Heavyweight Championship against Roman Reigns. Within the first minute, Lesnar performed a German Suplex and an F-5 on Reigns. Lesnar also suffered two minor cuts (first on one cheek and later on the chin) after his clash with Reigns, but went on to dominate the next ten minutes with knee strikes and various Suplexes (Fisherman, German, Overhead Belly-to-Belly, Vertical and Snap), leading to Lesnar screaming "Suplex City, Bitch!" (giving birth to his nickname "The Mayor of Suplex City" as well as the "Suplex City!" chant). Lesnar performed a second F-5 on Reigns for a nearfall. Lesnar removed his MMA gloves and slapped Reigns four times, causing him to bleed a little from the mouth. Lesnar performed three more German Suplexes and a third F-5 on Reigns for a nearfall. After a long domination from Lesnar, a turning point came around the twelve minute mark, when both men were at ringside: Reigns shoved Lesnar into a ring post, causing him to bleed from the forehead. Back to the ring, after Lesnar barely avoided a pinfall, Reigns performed three Superman Punches and two Spears for a nearfall. After Reigns attempted a fourth Superman Punch, Lesnar reversed it into a fourth F-5, but failed to follow up with a pin.

While both men were still down, Seth Rollins ran down to the ring with his Money in the Bank briefcase and cashed in his contract, making the Singles match a Triple Threat match and the first time in history a Money in the Bank contract was cashed in during a Wrestlemania main event match. Rollins kicked Reigns out of the ring and performed a Curb Stomp on Lesnar. After Rollins attempted a second Curb Stomp, Lesnar reversed it into an F-5 attempt, but Reigns performed a third Spear on Lesnar, saving Rollins. As Lesnar rolled out of the ring, Rollins performed a Curb Stomp on Reigns for a pinfall, winning his first WWE World Heavyweight Championship, the first world championship of his career and becoming the fourth heel to win in a WrestleMania main event. In the aftermath, Rollins ran up to the entrance stage with his WWE World Heavyweight Championship belt and celebrated, while WWE dubbed this victory as "The Heist of the Century".

== Reception ==
WWE claimed that the show was the highest-grossing WWE event ever at the time, drawing revenue of $12.6 million. WWE also claimed an attendance figure of 76,976. However, Dave Meltzer of the Wrestling Observer Newsletter reported an attendance of 67,000, and said during the second main card match that there were "actually a lot of empty seats all over the stadium", mostly in the upper deck.

The event received acclaim from fans and critics alike. John Powell of Canadian Online Explorer gave the event a perfect 10 out of 10-star rating, calling it "the best Mania ever", with the main event between Brock Lesnar, Roman Reigns, and Seth Rollins rated 8.5 stars out of 10. Sting vs. Triple H received the highest rating of 9 stars out of 10, and Undertaker vs. Bray Wyatt was rated 8 stars out of 10.

In his live report from the event, Dave Meltzer of the Wrestling Observer Newsletter described the event as "one of the best shows I've ever seen. Several great matches, a killer angle and very little that wasn't good". He also praised the involvement of Ronda Rousey. Overall, he stated that WrestleMania 31 was "one of the more balanced WrestleManias in history because there was not a bad match. But it also didn't have anything close to a match of the year or a candidate for best Mania match".

Jack De Menezes of The Independent said, "It will go down as one of, if not the greatest WrestleMania of all time. From NWO's reunion, to The Rock teaming up with Ronda Rousey and Randy Orton's incredible 'RKO outta nowhere', nearly every match delivered a spectacle fitting of the Grandest Stage of Them All".

== Aftermath ==
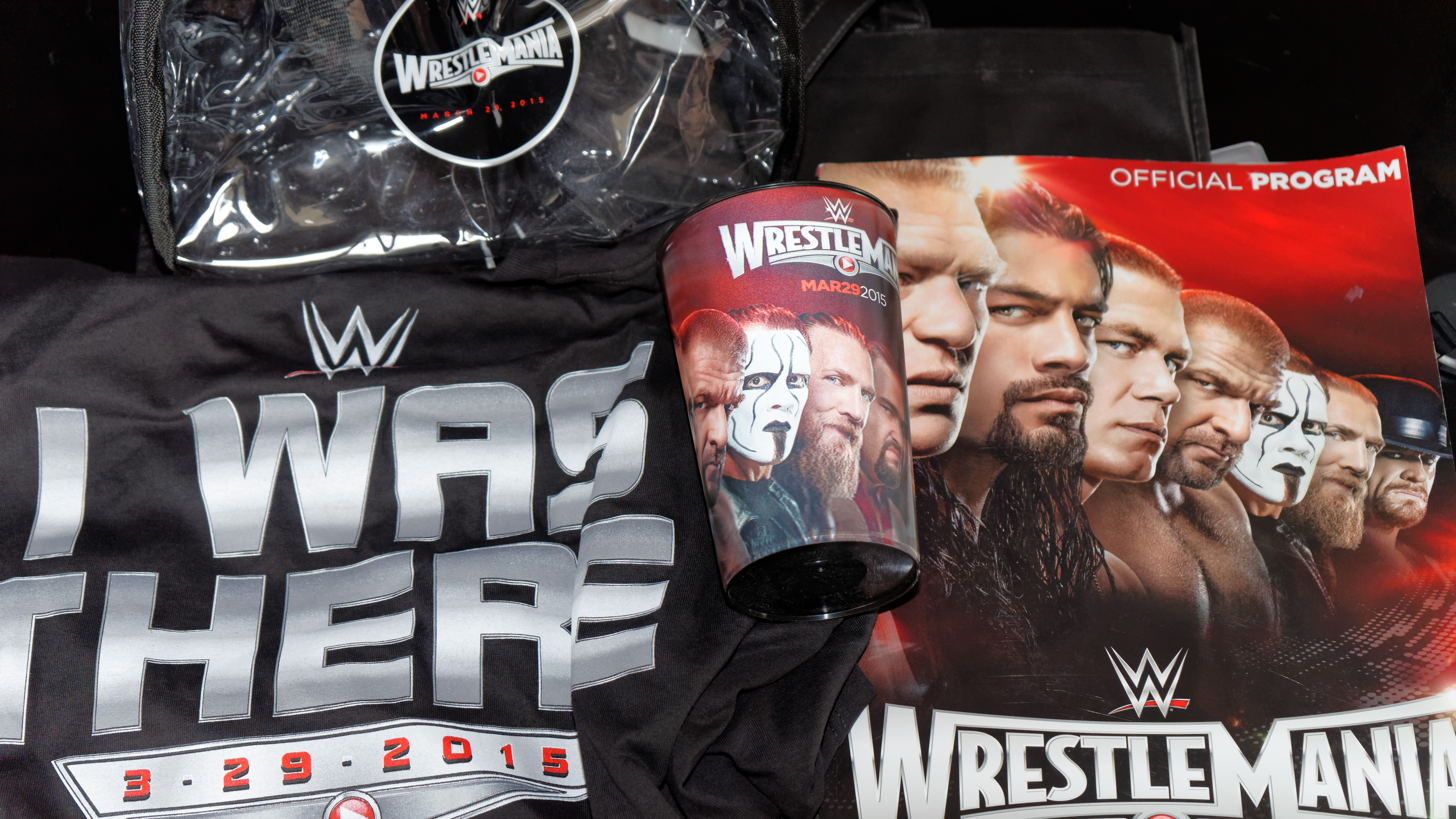
WrestleMania 31 merchandise

Dave Meltzer reported that members of Roman Reigns' family were legitimately upset at the finish of the main event, writing that especially his father Sika was furious to the point that there was "nearly a bad scene".

The following night on Raw, Brock Lesnar wanted to invoke his WWE World Heavyweight Championship rematch clause, but was denied by new champion Seth Rollins. Lesnar responded by attacking Rollins, who escaped. Lesnar then attacked Rollins' cornermen J&J Security (Jamie Noble and Joey Mercury), a cameraman, and the broadcast announcers (Booker T, John "Bradshaw" Layfield, and Michael Cole). As a result, Lesnar was suspended and fined by Stephanie McMahon in storyline. Byron Saxton and Jerry Lawler immediately replaced them in the broken announcer table. Tom Phillips also replaced Michael Cole as lead announcer for two weeks on the following Thursday on 'SmackDown.

Rollins returned later during the show, where Randy Orton requested a title shot due to beating Rollins the night before. Orton and Rollins then had a Steel Cage match for the title at Extreme Rules, where Rollins retained after interference from Kane. Due to Rollins not winning cleanly, a fatal four-way match was scheduled for Payback where Roman Reigns, Dean Ambrose, and Orton went for the title. Ambrose and Reigns were given title shots after beating Rollins on consecutive Raw shows. Rollins then defended the title against Ambrose at Elimination Chamber due to Ambrose stealing the title two weeks before the event. Rollins again retained at Money in the Bank after being demanded by The Authority to win without any form of assistance. The following night on Raw, Brock Lesnar would then return to face Rollins in the main event of Battleground, and their match ended with Lesnar winning by disqualification after interference from The Undertaker. On November 4, during a match against Kane at a WWE live event in Dublin, Ireland, Rollins tore the ACL, MCL, and medial meniscus in his knee while attempting to execute a sunset flip powerbomb. The injury required surgery and it was expected to take Rollins out of action for approximately six to nine months. As a result, Rollins vacated the WWE World Heavyweight Championship the next day, ending his reign at 220 days.

On the Raw after WrestleMania 31, Bryan defeated Dolph Ziggler for his first successful title defense; however, after the match, Bryan and Ziggler were attacked by Barrett only for Sheamus to return and chase off Barrett before attacking Bryan and Ziggler. Bryan faced Sheamus on that week's SmackDown and lost the match by count-out when Barrett interfered. During the match, Bryan hit his head on the announce table and suffered an unplanned cut on his forehead which caused him to bleed and later acquired stitches for the wound. Two weeks later on SmackDown, Daniel Bryan teamed up with United States Champion John Cena and defeated WWE Tag Team Champions Cesaro and Tyson Kidd via submission in what turned out to be Bryan's final televised match. Following the April 14 SmackDown taping, WWE pulled Daniel Bryan from wrestling on the remainder of WWE's touring of Europe as a "precautionary measure". Bryan's scheduled title defense at Extreme Rules on April 26 against Bad News Barrett was later cancelled as Bryan was "medically unable to compete". Less than a week later, WWE stopped advertising Bryan from all future live events or television tapings.

After about a month off television, Bryan returned on the May 11 episode of Raw. However, he announced that after having undergone an MRI, he would be out for an unknown period of time, and could possibly have to retire; the nature of his injuries were not revealed. Therefore, he relinquished the Intercontinental Championship. Ryback won Bryan's vacated WWE Intercontinental Championship at Elimination Chamber on May 31. In July, Bryan revealed that his injury was concussion-related and claimed that he had been cleared to return to the ring by external medical professionals and was waiting for WWE to clear him. After receiving further diagnostic information that convinced him retirement was necessary, Bryan announced his retirement prior to the February 8, 2016, episode of Raw. On March 20, 2018, after more than two years of evaluations, reviews of his medical history and neurological and physical evaluations, Bryan was cleared by three external independent neurosurgeons, neurologists, and concussion experts, in addition to Joseph Maroon, to return to WWE in-ring competition.

Also on Raw, AJ Lee, Naomi, and Paige defeated The Bella Twins (Nikki Bella and Brie Bella) and Natalya in a six-diva tag team match. This would be Lee's final match before retiring from in-ring competition with WWE on April 3. On the April 13 episode of Raw, Paige won a battle royal to become the number one contender to Nikki's Divas Championship at Extreme Rules. After the match, Naomi attacked Paige, turning heel, and injuring Paige in storyline.

In 2017, at WrestleMania 33, Brock Lesnar defeated Goldberg to become the Universal Champion; meanwhile, Roman Reigns became the second person to defeat The Undertaker at WrestleMania. On the post-WrestleMania 33 episode of Raw, Paul Heyman teased a match between Lesnar and Reigns for the Universal Championship, since they were the only two men to have defeated The Undertaker at WrestleMania. Lesnar would continue to hold the Universal Championship over the following year.

At Elimination Chamber in February 2018, Reigns defeated Strowman, Elias, John Cena, The Miz, Finn Bálor, and Rollins in the first-ever seven-man Elimination Chamber match to become the number one contender for the Universal Championship. In April, Lesnar had two successful, albeit controversial, televised title defenses against Reigns, first at WrestleMania 34 and then at the Greatest Royal Rumble inside a steel cage. Reigns eventually defeated Lesnar at SummerSlam in August to win his first Universal Championship, but would relinquish the title on the October 22, 2018, episode of Raw in order to undergo treatment for his leukemia, which he had been battling since 2007.

Reigns and Lesnar would clash for the third time at WrestleMania 38 in the second night's main event to unify Lesnar's WWE and Reigns' Universal Championships, although by this point Lesnar would be a face, and Reigns a heel with Paul Heyman in his corner. Reigns would win to become the first undisputed world champion in WWE since Dean Ambrose (now going by Jon Moxley) in 2016.

In August 2025, Rollins, after having won the Money in the Bank contract for the second time and faking a knee injury at Saturday Night's Main Event the previous month, would cash in on CM Punk at SummerSlam to win the World Heavyweight Championship, a victory that would be referred to as "The Ruse of the Century" in reference to his cash-in at WrestleMania 31.

== Results ==
No.	Results	Stipulations	Times
1^{P}	Tyson Kidd and Cesaro (c) (with Natalya) defeated Los Matadores (Diego and Fernando) (with El Torito), The New Day (Big E and Kofi Kingston) (with Xavier Woods), and The Usos (Jey Uso and Jimmy Uso) (with Naomi) by pinfall	Fatal four-way tag team match for the WWE Tag Team Championship	9:58
2^{P}	Big Show won by last eliminating Damien Mizdow (Note: Order of elimination from first eliminated: Curtis Axel, Adam Rose, Fandango, Alex Riley, Zack Ryder, Bo Dallas, Hideo Itami, Diego, Fernando, Sin Cara, Tyson Kidd, Mark Henry, Konnor, Viktor, Darren Young, Heath Slater, Titus O'Neil, Jack Swagger, Big E, Xavier Woods, Kofi Kingston, Erick Rowan, Goldust, Kane, Jimmy Uso, Cesaro, Ryback, The Miz, and Damien Mizdow.)	30-man André the Giant Memorial Battle Royal for the André the Giant Memorial Trophy	18:07
3	Daniel Bryan defeated Bad News Barrett (c), Dean Ambrose, Dolph Ziggler, Luke Harper, R-Truth, and Stardust	Ladder match for the WWE Intercontinental Championship	13:47
4	Randy Orton defeated Seth Rollins (with Jamie Noble and Joey Mercury) by pinfall	Singles match	13:15
5	Triple H defeated Sting by pinfall	No Disqualification match	18:36
6	AJ Lee and Paige defeated The Bella Twins (Brie Bella and Nikki Bella) by submission	Tag team match	6:42
7	John Cena defeated Rusev (c) (with Lana) by pinfall	Singles match for the WWE United States Championship	14:31
8	The Undertaker defeated Bray Wyatt by pinfall	Singles match	15:12
9	Seth Rollins defeated Brock Lesnar (c) (with Paul Heyman) and Roman Reigns by pinfall (Note: The match was originally a singles match between Lesnar and Reigns, however, Rollins cashed in his Money in the Bank briefcase while the match was in progress, making it a triple threat.)	Triple threat match for the WWE World Heavyweight Championship; This was Rollins's Money in the Bank cash-in match.	16:43
(c) / – the champion(s) heading into the match; P / – the match was broadcast on the pre-show

=== Andre the Giant Memorial Battle Royal qualifying tournament ===
The Andre the Giant Memorial Battle Royal Qualifying Tournament was a tournament at WrestleMania Axxess for a spot in the André the Giant Memorial Battle Royal.

1st Round; WrestleMania Axxess; March 8, 2015
Tyler Breeze	Pinfall
Bull Dempsey	—
Finn Bálor	Pinfall
Baron Corbin	—
Hideo Itami	Pinfall
Jason Jordan	—
Adrian Neville	Pinfall
Kalisto	—

Semifinals; NXT; March 26, 2015 (Aired: April 8)
Tyler Breeze	Pinfall
Finn Bálor	5:21
Hideo Itami	Pinfall
Adrian Neville	11:16

Final; NXT; March 26, 2015 (Aired: April 8)
Finn Bálor	7:58
Hideo Itami	Pinfall
