= Juicy J discography =

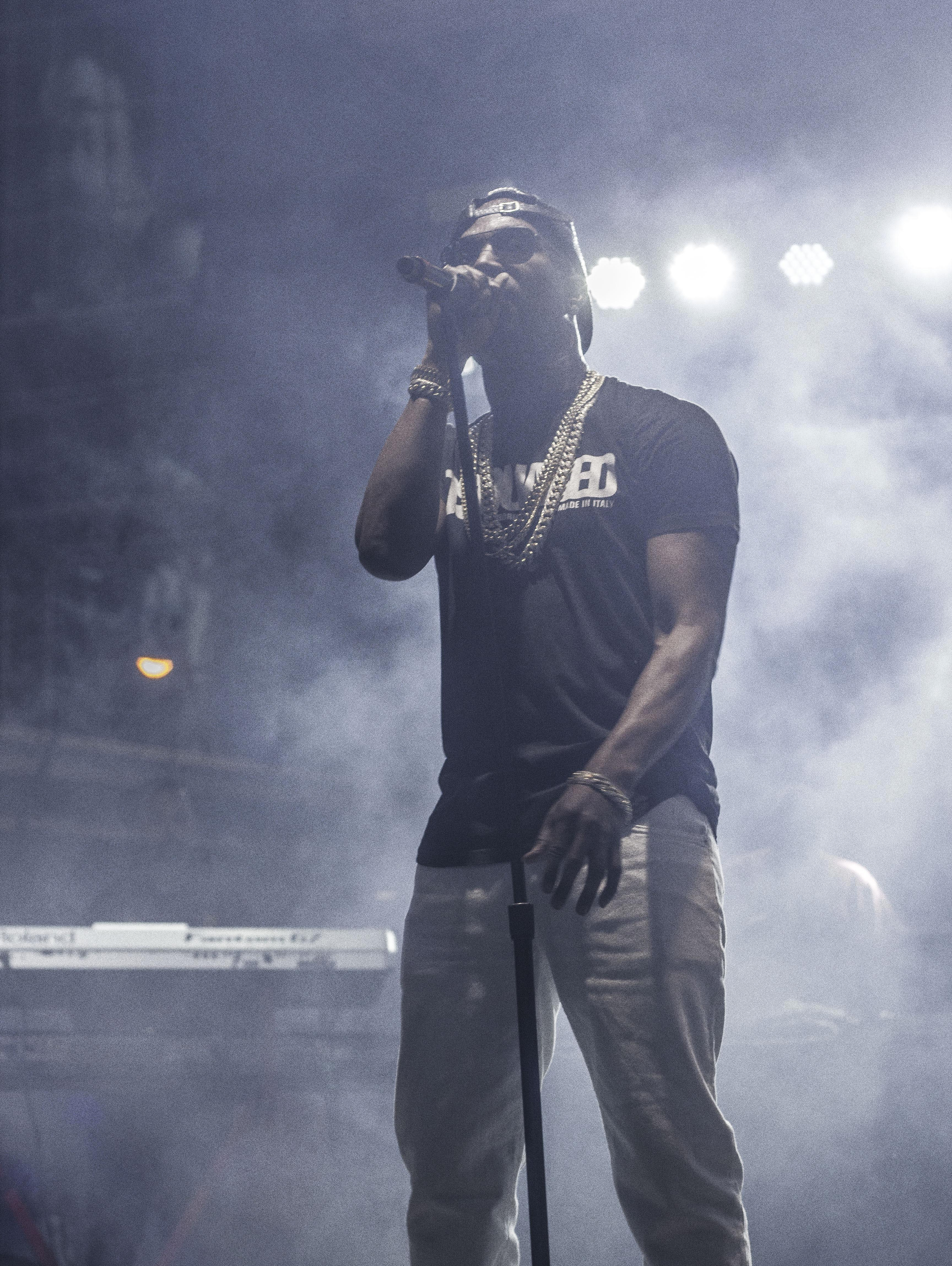
- Juicy J performing in 2014
- Studio albums: 6
- Singles: 49
- Mixtapes: 24
- Promotional singles: 2

The discography of American rapper Juicy J consists of six studio albums, 22 singles (in addition to 34 as a featured artist), two promotional singles and eighty music videos.

== Albums ==
=== Studio albums ===
List of studio albums, with selected chart positions
Title	Album details	Peak chart positions				
Title	Album details	US	US R&B/HH	US Rap	CAN	UK
Chronicles of the Juice Man	Released: July 16, 2002; Label: North North, Street Level; Format: CD, LP, cassette, digital download	93	17	—	—	—
Hustle Till I Die	Released: June 16, 2009; Label: Hypnotize Minds, Select-O-Hits; Format: CD, LP, digital download	106	21	9	—	—
Stay Trippy	Released: August 27, 2013; Label: Kemosabe, Taylor Gang, Columbia; Format: CD, digital download	4	2	1	11	174
Rubba Band Business	Released: December 8, 2017; Label: Kemosabe, Taylor Gang, Columbia; Format: CD, digital download	191	—	—	—	—
The Hustle Continues	Released: November 27, 2020; Label: Trippy Music, E1 Music; Format: LP, digital download, streaming	68	28	23	—	—
Ravenite Social Club	Released: August 27, 2024; Label: Trippy Music, Stem; Format: Digital download, streaming	—	—	—	—	—
"—" denotes a recording that did not chart or was not released in that territory.

=== Collaborative albums ===
List of collaborative albums, with selected chart positions
Title	Album details	Peak chart positions			
Title	Album details	US	US R&B/HH	US Rap	CAN
Rude Awakening (with Wiz Khalifa and TM88 as TGOD Mafia)	Released: June 3, 2016; Label: Atlantic, Columbia, Empire; Format: Digital download	26	3	3	81
Stoner's Night (with Wiz Khalifa)	Released: February 11, 2022; Label: Trippy Music; Format: Digital download	—	—	—	—
Space Age Pimpin (with Pi'erre Bourne)	Released: June 24, 2022; Label: Trippy Music; Format: Digital download	—	—	—	—
Memphis Zoo (with Xavier Wulf)	Released: July 11, 2024; Label: Trippy Music; Format: Digital download	—	—	—	—
Live and in Color (with Logic)	Released: June 13, 2025; Label: Trippy Music; Format: Digital download, streaming	—	—	—	—
DEM GOATS (with Project Pat)	Released: July 10, 2026; Label: Trippy Music, STEM; Format: Digital download, streaming	—	—	—	—

== Mixtapes ==
Title	Mixtape details
Volume 2: Da Exorcist (with DJ Paul)	Released: 1994; Label: Self-released; Format: Cassette
Play Me Some Pimpin (with Project Pat)	Released: April 28, 2009; Label: Self-released; Format: Digital download
The Realest Nigga in the Game	Released: May 11, 2009; Label: Self-released; Format: Digital download
Play Me Some Pimpin 2 (with Project Pat)	Released: October 9, 2009; Label: Self-released; Format: Digital download
Cut Throat (with Project Pat)	Released: November 26, 2009; Label: Self-released; Format: Digital download
Cut Throat 2 (Dinner Thieves) (with Project Pat)	Released: March 16, 2010; Label: Self-released; Format: Digital download
Convicted Felons (with Project Pat and Bank Mr. 912)	Released: May 16, 2010; Label: Self-released; Format: Digital download
Rubba Band Business (with Lex Luger)	Released: December 27, 2010; Label: Self-released; Format: Digital download
Rubba Band Business 2 (with Lex Luger)	Released: May 2, 2011; Label: Self-released; Format: Digital download
Young Nigga Movement (with Lex Luger and V.A.B.P.)	Released: July 16, 2011; Label: Self-released; Format: Digital download
Blue Dream & Lean	Released: November 29, 2011; Label: Self-released; Format: Digital download
Cocaine Mafia (with Project Pat and French Montana)	Released: December 20, 2011; Label: Self-released; Format: Digital download
Blue Dream & Lean: Reloaded	Released: May 20, 2012; Label: Self-released; Format: Digital download
Blue Dream & Lean 2	Released: February 16, 2015; Label: Self-released; Format: Digital download
100% Juice	Released: September 9, 2015; Label: Self-released; Format: Digital download
O's to Oscars	Released: December 14, 2015; Label: Self-released; Format: Digital download
Lit in Ceylon	Released: July 11, 2016; Label: Self-released; Format: Digital download
Must Be Nice	Released: September 19, 2016; Label: Self-released; Format: Digital download
Gas Face	Released: May 15, 2017; Label: Taylor Gang; Format: Digital download
Highly Intoxicated	Released: September 18, 2017; Label: Taylor Gang; Format: Digital download
Shutdafukup	Released: January 15, 2018; Label: Self-released; Format: Digital download
Crypto Business (with Lex Luger & Trap-A-Holics)	Released: November 15, 2022; Label: Trippy Music; Format: Digital download
Mental Trillness	Released: March 31, 2023; Label: Trippy Music; Format: Digital download
Mental Trillness 2	Released: May 21, 2024; Label: Trippy Music; Format: Digital download
Head On Swivel	Released: August 1, 2025; Label: Trippy Music; Format: Digital download

== Singles ==
=== As lead artist ===
List of singles as lead artist, with selected chart positions and certifications, showing year released and album name
Title	Year	Peak chart positions			Certifications	Album
Title	Year	US	US R&B/HH	US Rap	Certifications	Album
"30 Inches" (featuring Gucci Mane and Project Pat)	2009	—	—	—		Hustle Till I Die
"Ugh Ugh Ugh" (featuring Webbie and Project Pat)	2009	—	—	—		Hustle Till I Die
"Twerk" (featuring Project Pat)	2009	—	—	—		Play Me Some Pimpin 2
"North Memphis Like Me" (Remix) (featuring Project Pat and V Slash)	2009	—	—	—		Non-album single
"Bandz a Make Her Dance" (featuring Lil Wayne and 2 Chainz)	2012	29	6	5	RIAA: Platinum	Stay Trippy
"Show Out" (featuring Big Sean and Young Jeezy)	2013	75	23	17		Stay Trippy
"Bounce It" (featuring Wale and Trey Songz)	2013	74	25	19	RIAA: Gold	Stay Trippy
"Talkin' Bout" (featuring Chris Brown and Wiz Khalifa)	2014	—	—	—		Stay Trippy
"Shell Shocked" (with Wiz Khalifa and Ty Dolla Sign featuring Kill the Noise and Madsonik)	2014	84	26	17	RIAA: Platinum	Teenage Mutant Ninja Turtles soundtrack
"Low" (featuring Nicki Minaj, Lil Bibby and Young Thug)	2014	—	44	—		Non-album singles
"For Everybody" (featuring Wiz Khalifa and R. City)	2015	—	50	—		Non-album singles
"All I Need (One Mo Drank)" (featuring K Camp)	2015	—	—	—		Blue Dreams & Lean 2
"All Night" (with Wiz Khalifa)	2016	—	—	—		TGOD Mafia: Rude Awakening
"No English" (featuring Travis Scott)	2016	—	—	—		Rubba Band Business
"Ballin" (featuring Kanye West)	2016	—	—	—		Non-album single
"Ain't Nothing" (featuring Wiz Khalifa and Ty Dolla $ign)	2017	— (Note: "Ain't Nothing" did not enter the Billboard Hot 100, but peaked at number 24 on the Bubbling Under Hot 100 Singles chart.)	— (Note: "Ain't Nothing" did not enter the Billboard Hot R&B/Hip-Hop Songs chart, but peaked at number two on the Bubbling Under R&B/Hip-Hop Singles chart.)	—		Rubba Band Business
"Gimme Gimme" (featuring Slim Jxmmi)	2017	—	—	—		Non-album single
"Flood Watch" (featuring Offset)	2017	—	—	—		Rubba Band Business
"Kama Sutra" (featuring Cardi B)	2017	—	—	—		Highly Intoxicated and Shutdafukup
"You Can Cry" (with Marshmello featuring James Arthur)	2018	—	—	—		Non-album singles
"Neighbor" (featuring Travis Scott)	2018	—	—	—		Non-album singles
"Let Me See" (featuring Kevin Gates and Lil Skies)	2019	—	—	—		Non-album singles
"Three Point Stance" (featuring City Girls and Megan Thee Stallion)	2019	—	—	—		Non-album singles
"Crunk Ain't Dead" (Remix) (with Duke Deuce and Lil Jon featuring Project Pat)	2020	—	—	—		Memphis Massacre 2
"Find One" (with The 1911 Show)	2020	—	—	—		Non-album singles
"Yerba" (with Alek Sandar)	2020	—	—	—		Non-album singles
"Sigo Fresh" (Remix) (with Fuego and De La Ghetto featuring Myke Towers and Duki)	2020	—	—	—		Non-album singles
"Hella Fuckin' Trauma"	2020	—	—	—		Non-album singles
"Gah Damn High" (with Lex Luger featuring Wiz Khalifa)	2020	—	—	—		The Hustle Continues
"STCU" (with THEY.)	2020	—	—	—		The Amanda Tape
"Load It Up" (featuring NLE Choppa)	2020	—	—	—		The Hustle Continues
"Spend It" (featuring Lil Baby and 2 Chainz)	2021	—	—	—		The Hustle Continues
"Hitta" (with Marshmello and Eptic)	2021	—	—	—		Shockwave
"In You" (with Bella Thorne)	2021	—	—	—		Non-album single
"Pop That Trunk" (with Wiz Khalifa)	2021	—	—	—		Stoner's Night
"Backseat" (with Wiz Khalifa and Project Pat)	2022	—	—	—		Stoner's Night
"Step Back" (with Duke Deuce)	2022	—	—	—		Non-album single
"—" denotes a recording that did not chart or was not released in that territory.

=== As featured artist ===
List of singles as featured artist, with selected chart positions and certifications, showing year released and album name
Title	Year	Peak chart positions							Certifications	Album
Title	Year	US	US R&B/HH	US Rap	CAN	GER	NZ Hot	UK	Certifications	Album
"Workin' Chick" (Frenchie featuring Juicy J)	2011	—	—	—	—	—	—	—		Non-album single
"You Need Haters" (French Montana featuring Juicy J and Project Pat)	2011	—	—	—	—	—	—	—		Cocaine Mafia
"Piss Test" (A-Trak featuring Juicy J and Danny Brown)	2012	—	—	—	—	—	—	—		Fool's Gold Presents: Loosies
"Instagram That Hoe" (Fat Joe featuring Rick Ross and Juicy J)	2012	—	—	—	—	—	—	—		Non-album single
"We Still in This Bitch" (B.o.B featuring T.I. and Juicy J)	2013	64	19	14	72	—	—	—	RIAA: Platinum	Underground Luxury
"With Ur Love" (Cher Lloyd featuring Juicy J)	2013	— (Note: "With Ur Love" did not enter the Billboard Hot 100, but peaked at number one on the Bubbling Under Hot 100 Singles chart.)	—	—	—	—	—	—		Non-album single
"Lucky Ass Bitch" (Mac Miller featuring Juicy J)	2013	—	—	—	—	—	—	—		Macadelic
"Crazy Kids" (Ke$ha featuring Juicy J)	2013	40	—	—	47	—	—	—		Non-album single
"Entertainment 2.0" (Sean Paul featuring Juicy J, 2 Chainz and Nicki Minaj)	2013	—	—	—	94	—	—	—		Full Frequency
"4 What" (DJ Drama featuring Young Jeezy, Yo Gotti and Juicy J)	2013	—	—	—	—	—	—	—		Non-album singles
"23" (Mike WiLL Made It featuring Miley Cyrus, Wiz Khalifa and Juicy J)	2013	11	2	2	26	—	—	85	RIAA: 4× Platinum; RMNZ: Gold	Non-album singles
"Dark Horse" (Katy Perry featuring Juicy J)	2013	1	—	—	1	6	—	4	RIAA: 11× Platinum; BPI: Platinum; BVMI: Platinum; MC: 3× Platinum; RMNZ: 4× Platinum	Prism
"Clappers" (Wale featuring Nicki Minaj and Juicy J)	2013	— (Note: "Clappers" did not enter the Billboard Hot 100, but peaked at number eight on the Bubbling Under Hot 100 Singles chart.)	37	—	—	—	—	—		The Gifted
"Lolly" (Maejor Ali featuring Juicy J and Justin Bieber)	2013	19	5	—	27	—	—	56		
"Keep Calm" (DJ Kay Slay featuring Juicy J, Jadakiss, 2 Chainz and Rico Love)	2013	—	—	—	—	—	—	—		
"Business Men" (Rejects featuring Juicy J)	2014	—	—	—	—	—	—	—		
"Never Be a G" (Project Pat featuring Juicy J and Doe B)	2014	—	—	—	—	—	—	—		Mista Don't Play 2
"Business" (Drei Ros featuring Juicy J, Lawrence da Prince and Archie)	2014	—	—	—	—	—	—	—		Non-album singles
"DI$Function" (Young Scooter featuring Future, Juicy J and Young Thug)	2014	—	—	—	—	—	—	—		Non-album singles
"Twerkin 4 Birkin" (Ester Dean featuring Juicy J)	2014	—	—	—	—	—	—	—		Non-album singles
"The Business" (Lamborghini Ace featuring Juicy J)	2014	—	—	—	—	—	—	—		Non-album singles
"KK" (Wiz Khalifa featuring Project Pat and Juicy J)	2014	— (Note: "KK" did not enter the Billboard Hot 100, but peaked at number eight on the Bubbling Under Hot 100 Singles chart.)	35	25	—	—	—	—		Blacc Hollywood
"She Knows" (Ne-Yo featuring Juicy J)	2014	19	6	—	85	—	—	28	RIAA: Platinum; BPI: Gold; RMNZ: Gold	Non Fiction
"Multiply" (ASAP Rocky featuring Juicy J)	2014	—	49	—	—	—	—	184	RIAA: Gold	Non-album singles
"I Don't Mind" (Usher featuring Juicy J)	2014	11	1	—	82	—	—	8	RIAA: 4× Platinum; BPI: Platinum; RMNZ: Platinum	Non-album singles
"On Me" (K Check featuring Kevin Gates, Problem and Juicy J)	2015	—	—	—	—	—	—	—		Non-album singles
"Make That Shit Work" (T-Pain featuring Juicy J)	2015	—	—	—	—	—	—	—		Non-album singles
"Yamborghini High" (A$AP Mob featuring Juicy J)	2016	—	— (Note: "Yamborghini High" did not enter the Billboard Hot R&B/Hip-Hop Songs chart, but peaked at number seven on the Bubbling Under Hot 100 Singles chart.)	—	—	—	—	—	RIAA: Platinum; RMNZ: Gold	Cozy Tapes Vol. 1: Friends
"One Shot" (Robin Thicke featuring Juicy J)	2016	—	—	—	—	—	—	—		Non-album single
"Money" (Project Pat featuring Juicy J)	2017	—	—	—	—	—	—	—		M.O.B.
"Gilligan" (Shelley FKA DRAM featuring A$AP Rocky and Juicy J)	2017	—	—	—	—	—	—	—		Big Baby DRAM
"Powerglide" (Rae Sremmurd featuring Juicy J)	2018	28	17	12	33	—	—	—	RIAA: 3× Platinum; RMNZ: Gold	SR3MM
"Flight to Memphis" (Smooky MarGielaa featuring Chris Brown, Juicy J and A$AP Rocky)	2018	—	—	—	—	—	—	—		Non-album singles
"Hottest in the City" (Ty Dolla $ign featuring Juicy J and Project Pat)	2019	—	—	—	—	—	—	—		Non-album singles
"Twisted" (French Montana featuring Juicy J, Logic and ASAP Rocky)	2019	—	—	—	—	—	24	—		Montana
"I Got the Sauce" (Denny Strickland featuring Juicy J)	2021	—	—	—	—	—	—	—		Non-album singles
"SDAB" (Beatking featuring 2 Chainz and Juicy J)	2021	—	—	—	—	—	—	—		Non-album singles
"Like a Pro" (Kash Doll featuring Juicy J)	2021	—	—	—	—	—	—	—		Non-album singles
"Where It Hurts" (Remix) (POINTS featuring Juicy J)	2021	—	—	—	—	—	—	—		Non-album singles
"Hella Girls" (Fendi P featuring Juicy J)	2021	—	—	—	—	—	—	—		Non-album singles
"Original Classic" (Keys N Krates, Chip and Marbl featuring Juicy J)	2021	—	—	—	—	—	—	—		Original Classic
"Diamonds In the Sky" (Baby E featuring Juicy J)	2021	—	—	—	—	—	—	—		Non-album singles
"All Winners" (Ali Kulture, Big Boi Deep and Byg Byrd featuring Juicy J and DJ Rob Mista Dmv)	2022	—	—	—	—	—	—	—		Non-album singles
"Freak Junk" (Hitkidd featuring Juicy J and Gloss Up)	2022	—	—	—	—	—	—	—		Non-album singles
"Make America High Again" (Henry AZ featuring Juicy J)	2022	—	—	—	—	—	—	—		Non-album singles
"Represent" (Fler featuring Juicy J)	2023	—	—	—	—	—	—	—		Non-album singles
"This Lil' Game We Play" (Jermaine Dupri feat. Nelly, Ashanti & Juicy J)	2024	—	—	—	—	—	—	—		Non-album singles
"Open The Pit" (Crankdat feat. Juicy J)	2024	—	—	—	—	—	—	—		Non-album singles
"Don't Kill the Party" (Ty Dolla Sign featuring Quavo and Juicy J)	2026	87	23	15	39	—	20	—		Tycoon
"—" denotes a recording that did not chart or was not released in that territory.

=== Promotional singles ===
List of promotional singles, with selected chart positions, showing year released and album name
Title	Year	Peak chart positions	Album
Title	Year	US R&B/HH	Album
"Pour It Up" (Remix) (Rihanna featuring Young Jeezy, Rick Ross, Juicy J and T.I.)	2013	—	Non-album single
"One of Those Nights" (featuring The Weeknd)	2013	56	Stay Trippy
"—" denotes a recording that did not chart or was not released in that territory.

== Other charted and certified songs ==
List of songs, with selected chart positions, showing year released and album name
Title	Year	Peak chart positions				Certifications	Album
Title	Year	US	US R&B /HH	US Rap	NZ Hot	Certifications	Album
"Smokin' On" (Snoop Dogg and Wiz Khalifa featuring Juicy J)	2011	— (Note: "Smokin' On" did not enter the Billboard Hot 100, but peaked at number 17 on the Bubbling Under Hot 100 Singles chart.)	—	—	—		Mac & Devin Go to High School
"Medicated" (Wiz Khalifa featuring Juicy J and Chevy Woods)	2012	—	44	—	—	RIAA: Gold	O.N.I.F.C.
"Trippy" (Lil Wayne featuring Juicy J)	2013	— (Note: "Trippy" did not enter the Billboard Hot 100, but peaked at number 14 on the Bubbling Under Hot 100 Singles chart.)	39	—	—		I Am Not a Human Being II
"Thinking with My Dick" (Kevin Gates featuring Juicy J)	2013	37	13	11	—	RIAA: Gold	Stranger Than Fiction
"Scholarship" (featuring ASAP Rocky)	2013	—	52	—	—		Stay Trippy
"Wavybone" (ASAP Rocky featuring Juicy J and UGK)	2015	—	54	—	—		At. Long. Last. A$AP
"Woosah" (Jeremih featuring Juicy J and Twista)	2015	—	—	—	—	RIAA: Gold	Late Nights
"iSay" (Wiz Khalifa featuring Juicy J)	2016	—	52	—	—		Khalifa
"Ink Blot" (Logic featuring Juicy J)	2017	—	60	—	—		Everybody
"Emerald / Burgandy" (Chris Brown featuring Juvenile and Juicy J)	2019	—	—	—	9		Indigo
"Lane Switcha" (Skepta and Pop Smoke featuring ASAP Rocky, Project Pat and Juicy J)	2021	—	—	—	9		F9: The Fast Saga (Original Motion Picture Soundtrack)
"—" denotes a recording that did not chart or was not released in that territory.

== Guest appearances ==
List of non-single guest appearances, with other performing artists, showing year released and album name
Title	Year	Other artist(s)	Album/Mixtape
"One Life 2 Live"	1996	Kingpin Skinny Pimp, DJ Paul	King of Da Playaz Ball
Break da Law 98	1998	Indo G, DJ Paul	Angel Dust
My Nigga Crazy	1998	Indo G, DJ Paul	Angel Dust
Will a NIgga Make It	1998	Indo G, DJ Paul	Angel Dust
"Fuck What Ya Heard"	1998	Indo G, DJ Paul	Angel Dust
"Oh No"	1998	Gangsta Boo, DJ Paul	Enquiring Minds
"Don't Stand So Close"	1998	Gangsta Boo, DJ Paul	Enquiring Minds
"Suck a Little Dick"	1998	Gangsta Boo, DJ Paul	Enquiring Minds
"Where Dem Dollars At"	1998	Gangsta Boo, DJ Paul	Enquiring Minds
"Represent It"	1999	Project Pat, DJ Paul, N.O.R.E.	Ghetty Green
"Gold Shine	1999	Project Pat, DJ Paul	Ghetty Green
"Sucks on Dick"	1999	Project Pat, DJ Paul	Ghetty Green
"Smackin Killa"	2000	Project Pat, DJ Paul	Murderers & Robbers
"If You Ain't from My Hood"	2001	Project Pat, DJ Paul	Mista Don't Play: Everythangs Workin'
"Good and Hi"	2001	Gangsta Boo	Both Worlds *69
"Like a Pimp"	2001	UGK	Ridin' Dirty
"You Ain't Mad Iz Ya?"	2001	La Chat, DJ Paul	Murder She Spoke
"Ghetto Ballin'"	2001	La Chat, DJ Paul	Murder She Spoke
"Wolf Pack"	2001	La Chat, Three Six Mafia	Murder She Spoke
"Players In Da Atmosphere"	2003	Lil Wyte, DJ Paul	Doubt Me Now
"Get High To This"	2003	Lil Wyte, DJ Paul, Crunchy Black, La Chat, Frayser Boy	Doubt Me Now
"Nan Notha'"	2003	Frayser Boy, DJ Paul	Gone On That Bay
"Young Niggaz"	2003	Frayser Boy	Gone On That Bay
"Flickin'"	2003	Frayser Boy, DJ Paul	Gone On That Bay
"H.C.P"	2003	Frayser Boy, DJ Paul, Crunchy Black, Lord Infamous, Lil Wyte	Gone On That Bay
"Bald Head Hoe's"	2004	Lil Wyte, DJ Paul	Phinally Phamous
"Fucked Up"	2007	Lil Wyte	The One and Only
"Oxycotton 2"	2009	Lil Wyte	The Bad Influence
"Black and Yellow" (G-Mix)	2010	Wiz Khalifa, Snoop Dogg, T-Pain	none
"Errday"	2011	Wiz Khalifa	Cabin Fever
"Niggas So Cut Throat"	2011	Project Pat, Brisco	Loud Pack
"Kelly Green"	2011	Project Pat	Loud Pack
"Posse Song"	2011	Lil Wyte, JellyRoll, DJ Paul, BPZ, Project Pat, V-Slash, Lil Reno	Year Round
"Bounce Back"	2011	Yung Joc, Project Pat	Ready to Fly
"Str8 Slammin'"	2011	Freddie Gibbs	Cold Day In Hell
"I Think I'm Sprung"	2011	Young Dolph	High Class Street Music 2 (Hustler's Paradise)
"Body Work"	2011	Pusha T, French Montana, Meek Mill	Fear of God II: Let Us Pray
"Mack Down"	2011	Tyga	#BitchImTheShit
"Slab"	2011	Devin Miles	none
"Smokin' On"	2011	Snoop Dogg, Wiz Khalifa	Mac & Devin Go to High School
"Tryna Fuck"	2012	Stuey Rock, Slim Dunkin	Deez Hooks Ain't Free
"Chain Dumbin'"	2012	Project Pat, Reggie B	Dumbin' E.P.
"LIFT"	2012	Hodgy, Domo Genesis	none
"Top Off" (Remix)	2012	Pac Man, 2 Chainz, Gorilla Zoe	Tha Come Up Pt. 2
"The Life"	2012	Don Trip, Yo Gotti, Young Dolph	Guerrilla
"Bout That Life"	2012	Donnis	none
"Obsession"	2012	Gorilla Zoe, Project Pat	Gorilla Zoe World
"Middle Finger"	2012	Project Pat, Nasty Mane	Belly On Full
"Money & Marijuana"	2012	Project Pat, Nasty Mane	Belly On Full
"My Favorite Song"	2012	Wiz Khalifa	Taylor Allderdice
"T.A.P."	2012	Wiz Khalifa	Taylor Allderdice
"Blindfolds"	2012	Wiz Khalifa	Taylor Allderdice
"The Code"	2012	Wiz Khalifa, LoLa Monroe, Chevy Woods	Taylor Allderdice
"They Point"	2012	E-40, 2 Chainz	The Block Brochure: Welcome to the Soil 1
"My City on Lock"	2012	Drumma Boy, Lil Peanut	Welcome To My City 2
"Self Made"	2012	Akon, French Montana, Project Pat	The Koncrete Mixtape
"Sky High"	2012	Young Dolph	A Time 2 Kill
"I'm Trippin"	2012	Future	Pluto
"Rich Nigga Shit"	2012	DJ Paul, Ya Boy	For I Have Sinned
"Temptation" (Remix)	2012	Big K.R.I.T., Waka Flocka Flame	none
"Starter Kit"	2012	Tolly	Beat Knock
"Vice"	2012	Chevy Woods, Wiz Khalifa	Gang Land
"Hop Out"	2012	Chevy Woods, Soulja Boy	Gang Land
"Cah"	2012	Chevy Woods, Soulja Boy	Gang Land
"Two Hundred"	2012	Chevy Woods, Tuki Carter	Gang Land
"Skittlez"	2012	Mach Five	Ratchet Shit Vol. 3
"Bon Voyage"	2012	Vali	Kiss the Sky
"Cash Erewhere"	2012	Mike WiLL Made It, Ace Hood	Est. In 1989 (Part 2)
"Autopilot" (Remix)	2012	Jose Guapo	none
"100 Racks"	2012	Ya Boy	Trappy Birthday
"Geek'n"	2012	Ace Hood, Choo Choo	Body Bag Vol. 2
"At The Bar"	2012	Diamond, Jackie Chain	The Young Life
"Fighting Words"	2012	Trae tha Truth, T.I.	Tha Blackprint
"Yo Bitch Chose Me"	2012	Twista	Reloaded
"Experimental"	2012	Big Sean, King Chip	Detroit
"Choppa Lay Em Down"	2012	V.A.B.P.	Young Nigga Movement 2
"Wasabi"	2012	MellowHype	MELLOWHYPEWEEK
"1200"	2012	Belly	Trap Hour
"White Bitches"	2012	Boobe	Trap Hour
"Polo"	2012	Project Pat	Belly on Full 2
"Certified Freak"	2012	Berner, Chevy Woods	Urban Farmer
"On Deck"	2012	Sayitainttone, Earlly Mac, Big Sean	Lord n Taylor
"Flexin' & Finessin'"	2012	Iggy Azalea	TrapGold
"My Type of Party" (Remix)	2012	Dom Kennedy, Tyga	none
"MIA"	2012	Wiz Khalifa	Cabin Fever 2
"Ridin Round"	2012	Wiz Khalifa	Cabin Fever 2
"Stu"	2012	Wiz Khalifa	Cabin Fever 2
"Pacc Talk"	2012	Wiz Khalifa, Problem	Cabin Fever 2
"I'm Feelin"	2012	Wiz Khalifa, Problem, J.R. Donato	Cabin Fever 2
"Same Old Song"	2012	The Weeknd	Trilogy
"Still Ridin Clean"	2012	Tuki Carter	Atlantafornication
"She Want"	2012	Don Trip, Jae Fitz	Help Is on the Way
"Splash"	2012	Cannible	The Repast
"Living Life"	2012	Terrace Martin, Problem, A Da Business	none
"Die Young" (Remix)	2012	Kesha, Wiz Khalifa, Becky G	none
"Gone"	2012	Wiz Khalifa	none
"The Plan"	2012	Wiz Khalifa	O.N.I.F.C.
"Blow 2.0"	2012	DJ Scream, Future, Ludacris	none
"My Hoes They Do Drugs"	2012	King Louie, Pusha T	Drilluminati
"Money Bag"	2012	Pill	Over The Counter Drugs
"Piss Test" (Remix)	2012	A-Trak, Jim Jones, Flatbush Zombies, El-P, Flosstradamus	Loosies
"Against the Wall"	2012	Juvenile, Rand, Doe-B	Juvie Tuesdays
"I Hit That"	2012	Mike WiLL Made It, Gucci Mane	Est. In 1989 2.5
"Own Drugs (O.D.)"	2012	Mike WiLL Made It, 2 Chainz, Cap1	Est. In 1989 2.5
"Trippin on Me"	2012	Rich Kidz	2012 (The Mixtape) Hosted by DJ Scream
"Brand New"	2012	Young Buck	Bond Money
"Everything Louie"	2013	Project Pat	Cheez N Dope
"Twerk Off"	2013	Lloyd	none
"I Like"	2013	YG	Just Re'd Up 2
"She Bad Bad" (Remix)	2013	Eve, Pusha T	Lip Lock
"Last Day"	2013	Joe Budden, Lloyd Banks	No Love Lost
"Three 60"	2013	Currensy	New Jet City
"Drugs In Da Club"	2013	Dorrough	Shut the City Down
"T.U."	2013	Hit-Boy, Audio Push, Problem	All I've Ever Dreamed Of
"Constant Conversations" (Remix)	2013	Passion Pit	none
"Gunwalk"	2013	Lil Wayne, Gudda Gudda	I Am Not a Human Being II
"Trippy"	2013	Lil Wayne	I Am Not a Human Being II
"Right There"	2013	Chinx Drugz, French Montana	Cocaine Riot 3
"I Want It All"	2013	B. Martin, Kendrick Lamar	none
"Hello Love" (Remix)	2013	T. Rone, Jim Jones, Fat Joe, Raheem Devaughn	none
"Fly As Us"	2013	Berner, Chevy Woods	Urban Farmer
"Freshy"	2013	will.i.am	#willpower
"Bad Bitches Link Up"	2013	T-Pain, Trey Songz	Stoicville: The Phoenix
"Want Some Have Some"	2013	Funkmaster Flex	Who You Mad At? Me or Yourself?
"Pop A Molly"	2013	Nasty Mane	K.U.S.H.
"Like Me"	2013	Los	Becoming King
"Young Niggas"	2013	Casey Veggies	none
"Females Welcomed" (Remix)	2013	Trinidad James	none
"Let Me Find Out" (Remix)	2013	Doe B, T.I.	G.D.O.D. (Get Dough Or Die)
"RSD"	2013	FKi, DJ Spinz, Strap	Transformers n the Hood 2
"Come Up Off That"	2013	DJ Scream, Project Pat, Migos	The Ratchet Superior
"4 What"	2013	DJ Drama, Young Jeezy, Yo Gotti	Quality Street Music 2
"Young Nigga" (Remix)	2013	Que, Migos, B.o.B	none
"Ratchet In My Benz"	2013	Ty Dolla Sign	Beach House 2
"Total"	2013	Cory Gunz	Datz WTF I'm Talkin Bout
"MILF"	2013	Big Sean, Nicki Minaj	Hall of Fame
"Makaveli"	2013	LoLa Monroe	Lipstick & Pistols
"B.B."	2013	LoLa Monroe, Chevy Woods	Lipstick & Pistols
"Getting Cash"	2013	Project Pat	Cheez N Dope 2
"I Ain't Gotta Say Shit"	2013	Young Chop	Precious
"Super Throwed"	2013	The Game	OKE: Operation Kill Everything
"Cash In A Rubberband"	2013	DJ Bay Bay, Wiz Khalifa, Project Pat	Bay Bay Day 2013
"Do This All the Time"	2013	Chevy Woods	Gang Land 2
"Own the Club"	2013	Chevy Woods	Gang Land 2
"Body Parts"	2013	Da Mafia 6ix, Kingpin Skinny Pimp, Lil Wyte, Project Pat, Locodunit, J Green, Point Blank, La Chat, Kokoe	6ix Commandments
"Show Ya Pussy"	2013	R. Kelly, Migos	Black Panties
"Chitty Bang"	2013	E-40, Ty Dolla Sign	The Block Brochure: Welcome to the Soil 4
"Double Cup"	2013	DJ Infamous, Jeezy, Ludacris, The Game and Hitmaka	none
"Shit" (Megamix)	2013	Mike WiLL Made It, Future, Drake, Jeezy, T.I., ScHoolboy Q, Diddy, Pastor Troy	#MikeWillBeenTrill
"Lap Dance"	2013	OverDoz	Boom
"All That"	2013	Rockie Fresh, Casey Veggies, Ty Dolla Sign	Fresh Veggies
"Greedy"	2013	2 Pistols	Coming Back Hard
"Trippy"	2013	Young A, Tay Don	Young A The Mixtape
"Clip So Long"	2014	Que	none
"Still in the Trap"	2014	Don Trip	Randy Savage
"Show Me" (Remix)	2014	Kid Ink, 2 Chainz, Chris Brown, Trey Songz	none
"Face It" (Weedmix)	2014	Curtis Williams	none
"Without You"	2014	Courtney Noelle	Love On The Run
"Rick James"	2014	Keyshia Cole	Point of No Return
"Legendary"	2014	Mobb Deep, Bun B	The Infamous Mobb Deep
"Have Some Fun"	2014	DJ Felli Fel, Cee Lo, Pitbull	none
"Turn Down For What" (Remix)	2014	DJ Snake, Lil Jon, 2 Chainz, French Montana	none
"Touchdown" (Remix)	2014	O.T. Genasis, Busta Rhymes	Catastrophic 2
"Word on the Town"	2014	Wiz Khalifa, Pimp C	28 Grams and Blacc Hollywood
"Live Forever"	2014	Travis Barker, Liz	22 Jump Street
"Cut Her Off" (Remix)	2014	K Camp, Boosie Badazz, YG	SlumLords
"Late Night"	2014	Trey Songz	Trigga
"She Twerkin" (Remix)	2014	Ca$h Out, Lil Boosie, Ty Dolla $ign, Kid Ink	none
"Can't Go No Mo"	2014	Jeremih	N.O.M.A (Not On My Album)
"For The Low, Pt. 2"	2014	Lil Bibby, Wiz Khalifa	Free Crack 2
"Ballin"	2014	Starlito, Kevin Gates	none
"Alley Oop"	2014	Reid Stefan, Derek Rhodes	none
"Drinkers Club"	2014	Big K.R.I.T., Rittz, A$AP Ferg	See Me On Top Vol. 4
"Cancel Her"	2014	King Ray, Ca$h Out, Project Pat	Kush 2
"Drive You Crazy"	2014	Pitbull, Jason Derulo	Globalization
"Imma Get Me Sum"	2014	Project Pat, Rick Ross	Cheez N Dope 3
"Rubber Bands"	2014	Project Pat	Cheez N Dope 3
"A1's"	2014	Project Pat	Cheez N Dope 3
"Four"	2014	BenZel, Cashmere Cat	Men - EP
"Everywhere We Go" (Remix)	2014	A1 Super Group, IamSu!	none
"Elvis Presley Blvd" (Remix)	2014	Rick Ross, Yo Gotti, Project Pat, MJG, Young Dolph	none
"Where Da Waitress"	2014	Young Money Yawn	Street Gospel 2
"Payback"	2015	Kevin Gates, Future, Sage the Gemini	Furious 7: Original Motion Picture Soundtrack
"Whatever Makes You Happy"	2015	Jennifer Hudson	Empire: Original Soundtrack from Season 1
"Pulled Up"	2015	Young Dolph, 2 Chainz	High Class Street Music 5
"Whole Thing"	2015	DJ RPM, Wiz Khalifa	Dirty Money Part 7
"Champagne"	2015	Chevy Woods	Gangland 3
"Big Blue"	2015	Sweet Valley, Soulja Boy	none
"BlackOut"	2015	The Americanos, Lil Jon, Tyga	none
"Wavybones"	2015	ASAP Rocky, UGK	At. Long. Last. ASAP
"Dats It Fa Ya"	2015	DJ Paul	Master Of Evil
"What The Fuck Is Ya'll On"	2015	Chief Keef	Tha Cozart
"Dat Chick"	2015	Baby E, Project Pat	none
"Broke" (Remix)	2015	GOD	none
"Centuries" (Remix)	2015	Fall Out Boy	Make America Psycho Again
"U Can't"	2015	Zaytoven	none
"PayDay"	2015	Pimp C	Long Live the Pimp
"Friends"	2015	Pimp C, Nas	Long Live the Pimp
"Marching Band"	2015	R. Kelly	The Buffet
"Blase" (Remix)	2015	Ty Dolla Sign, Jeezy, Diddy	none
"Pounds of Purple"	2015	Gucci Mane, Project Pat	Goochsomnia
"Jackie Tan"	2016	Peewee Longway, Wiz Khalifa	Mr. Blue Benjamin
"Energy"	2016	Tinashe	none
"iSay"	2016	Wiz Khalifa	Khalifa
"Pint Of Lean"	2016	Project Pat	Street God 2
"Gucci Said"	2016	Que	none
"Go (Gas)"	2016	Domo Genesis, Wiz Khalifa, Tyler, The Creator	Genesis
"All We Do"	2016	Berner, Wiz Khalifa	Hempire
"Zanzibar"	2016	Belly	Another Day in Paradise
"Lit"	2016	DJ Scream, 21 Savage, Young Dolph	none
"Get Paid" (Remix)	2016	Young Dolph, Project Pat, La Chat, 8 Ball, Gangsta Boo	none
"Shake it Fast"	2016	Rae Sremmurd	SremmLife 2
"Trippy Bounce"	2016	Skippa Da Flippa, Lil Yachty	I'm Tellin Ya
"Stomp Him Out" (Dats It Fa Ya Remix)	2016	DJ Paul	YOTS (Year Of The Six) Pt 1
"Don't Play"	2016	Sonny Digital, Sizzle	G.O.A.T
"Freaky Hoe"	2016	Rick Ross, Big K.I.R.T., Too $hort	Priorities 5
"On My Way"	2016	Mpala, Tory Lanez, Project Pat	Day Party
"Moonrock"	2016	DVBBS	Beautiful Disaster
"Magic Trick"	2016	Borgore	none
"Come Through"	2016	Taylor Gang	TGOD, Vol. 1
"Freaky Before"	2016	Taylor Gang, Wiz Khalifa, Ca$h Out, Project Pat	TGOD, Vol. 1
"Bombay and Lemonade"	2016	Taylor Gang, Wiz Khalifa, Chevy Woods	TGOD, Vol. 1
"Ask Juicy J"	2016	Don Trip	2 Clip Trip
"Love at Night"	2016	Austin Mahone	ForMe+You
"City on Lockdown"	2017	Yellow Claw, Lil Debbie	Los Amsterdam
"Strip Club"	2017	24hrs	none
"Jerry Maguire"	2017	Tuki Carter	Flowers & Planes
"Hollywood"	2017	Tuki Carter, Wiz Khalifa	Flowers & Planes
"Money On My Mind"	2017	Yogi, Alexander Lewis	none
"Ink Blot"	2017	Logic	Everybody
"I Got"	2017	Young Nudy	SlimeBall 2
"Good Drugs"	2017	Berner, Young Dolph	Tracking Numbers
"Ultimate" (Remix)	2017	Denzel Curry	32 Zel
"Streets Love Me"	2017	Smokepurpp	Deadstar
"Punk"	2017	Yelawolf, Travis Barker	Trial by Fire
"Confide"	2017	PnB Rock	Catch These Vibes
"Fuk Da Party Up"	2017	DJ Kay Slay, Ms Hustle, Project Pat, Meet Sims	The Big Brother
"No Limit" (Remix)	2017	G-Easy, A$AP Rocky, French Montana, Belly	none
"No Mo"	2017	Zaytoven	Zaytoven Presents: Trapping Made It Happen
"Gunz n Butter"	2018	ASAP Rocky	Testing
"Where Dat Booty"	2018	Project Pat, Trap Beckham	none
"Get Back"	2018	T-Shyne, Slim Jxmmi	The Immaculate
"Welcome to the Party" (Remix)	2018	Diplo, Lil Pump, French Montana, Famous Dex	none
"Slide"	2018	Doe Boy	88 Birdz
"That Be Me"	2018	Lud Foe	Boochie Gang
"Envious"	2018	Killumantii	Yellow Tape
"F.I.G.H.T."	2018	Mike WiLL Made It, Eearz, Gucci Mane, YG, Quavo	Creed II: The Album
"Overdose" (TSD Remix)	2018	Agnez Mo, Chris Brown	
"Gangsta Music"	2019	Yung Bleu	Bleu Vandross 2
"Don't You Wanna" (Remix)	2019	Denny Strickland	none
"Caddy's"	2019	Baka Not Nice	no long talk.
"Keep Counting"	2019	Don Trip	Don't Feed the Guerrillas
"By Mistake" (Remix)	2019	Young Dolph, Project Pat	none
"Slay"	2019	Chanti McCoy	none
"Wait A Minute"	2019	Party Favor, A$AP Ferg	Layers
"Find One"	2019	DJ Don Perryon, P-Skillz	none
"Simon Says"	2019	Megan Thee Stallion	Fever
"Buttered Up"	2019	Yung Gravy	Sensational
"Six Speed"	2019	Pouya	none
"18K"	2019	lilbootycall	Jesus Said Run It Back
"Emerald / Burgandy"	2019	Chris Brown, Juvenile	Indigo
"Freak Of The Week"	2019	Iggy Azalea	In My Defense
"50's & 100's"	2019	French Montana	MONTANA
"Last Name"	2019	Curren$y	Back at Burnie's
"Kicked Back"	2019	Henry AZ, Wiz Khalifa	Roommates
"Timberlake"	2020	BONES	Offline
"No Permission"	2020	DJ Kay Slay, A$AP Ferg, Dave East	Living Legend
"Issues (432 Hz)"	2020	Maejor	Vol 1: Frequency
"24"	2020	Duki, Kidd Keo	24
"SQUARE UP"	2020	IDK	IDK & FRIENDS 2 (Basketball County Soundtrack)
"Get Off My Dicc"	2020	Z-Ro	Rohammad Ali
"Resent"	2020	August Alsina, Lil Wayne	The Product III: State of Emergency
"Man Down"	2020	DJ Kay Slay, Jim Jones, Bun B, Pesh Mayweather	Homage
"Transparency"	2021	Henry AZ	Asking For a Friend
"Lane Switcha"	2021	Skepta, Pop Smoke, ASAP Rocky, Project Pat	F9: The Fast Saga (Original Motion Picture Soundtrack)
"7-11"	2021	Travis Thompson	BLVD BOY
"Strip Club Jesus"	2021	Fedd the God, Wiz Khalifa	Sense of Urgency
"Rock Session"	2021	Bobby Fishscale, DJ Paul	The Evolution
"RIP Young" (Remix)	2021	Isaiah Rashad, Project Pat	The House Is Burning [homies begged]
"WakenBake"	2023	Sonny Digital	Dolores Son
Binizz Man, Pt 2	2023	Papa Brain Anno Domini Nation	Di3: Hard
"Fancy Ass Bitch"	2023	City Girls	RAW
"Strictly for the Strippers"	2023	Sexyy Red	Hood Hottest Princess
"Don'T Tell"	2023	Bia	Really Her
"Super Bowl"	2023	Conway the Machine	Won't He Do It
"Paper Crown"	2024	The Black Keys, Beck	Ohio Players
"First Night"	2024	Lyrical Lemonade, Teezo Touchdown, Cochise, Denzel Curry, Lil B	All Is Yellow
"Never See"	2024	Cordae	The Crossroads

== See also ==
- Juicy J production discography
- Three 6 Mafia discography
