= Khaza =

Studio album by Kevin Gates
- Released: June 17, 2022
- Genre: Hip hop
- Length: 59:22
- Label: Atlantic; Bread Winners' Alumni
- Producer: 2Much; Al Geno; Arthur McArthur; Aye YB; Boobie; BricksDaMane; Chrishan; Cozy From Earth; DJ Chose; DzoBeats; Ghana 1k; Go Grizzly; HitmanAudio; Mattazik Muzik; Neil Muglurmath; Nick Mira; Nick Seeley; Patrick Carmelo; P-Crisco; RellyMade; SHEFF; Smash David; ThatBossEvan; T-Minus; Westen Weiss

Kevin Gates chronology
Only the Generals, Pt. II (2021)	Khaza (2022)	The Ceremony (2024)

Singles from Khaza
- 1. "Thinking with My Dick" Released: March 18, 2022; 2. "Big Lyfe" Released: April 28, 2022; 3. "Bad For Me" Released: May 16, 2022; 4. "Intro" Released: June 10, 2022

Khaza is the third studio album by American rapper Kevin Gates. It was released on June 17, 2022, via Atlantic Records and Bread Winners' Alumni. The album includes only one feature, Juicy J, however, it includes additional vocals from Gucci Mane. The album debuted and peaked at number eight on the US Billboard 200, moving 40,000 units in its first week.

== Background ==
On January 28, 2022, via Instagram, Gates reported the culmination of Khaza while also previewing and teasing an unreleased R&B album. Weeks later, on February 23, 2022, Gates indicated that he would tease the release date to the best comment on his Instagram post; nevertheless, it was never officially revealed.

On May 16, 2022, Gates announced the Big Lyfe Tour, which will commence on August 18, 2022, in Dallas, Texas, and will conclude on October 14, 2022, in Pensacola, Florida. On the same day, while promoting his single, "Bad for Me", Gates announced the album, its release date, and its cover art while also setting it for pre-sale.

On June 11, 2022, without previewing the tracklist on his social media, the tracklist was unveiled via Apple Music, and Tidal.

== Singles ==
The album's first single, "Thinking with My Dick" featuring Juicy J was released on July 16, 2013, however, the track had gone viral on the video-sharing platform TikTok, therefore, Gates decided to add it to the album's tracklist to increase sales as it had peaked at #37 on the Billboard Hot 100 after nine years.

The lead single "Big Lyfe" was released on April 28, 2022. The music video was released the same day.

The third single, "Bad For Me", was released on May 16, 2022.

A week prior to the release of the album, on June 9, 2022, Gates released a YouTube exclusive promotional single that remixed Kodak Black's "Super Gremlin", titled "Super General (Freestyle)", the song reached #1 trending in just one day. In the song, Gates revealed facts about his seven-year-long relationship with his wife Dreka Gates, and described how they have split apart. Just a day later from the viral single, on June 10, 2022, Gates released the final single from the album, "Intro" alongside its official music video.

Just two days prior to the release of "Intro", and three days prior to the release of "Super General (Freestyle)", on June 12, 2022, Gates released another YouTube exclusive promotional single titled "Metro" which is heavily reminiscent of his November 2009 track, "Grown Man Music".

== Critical reception ==
Professional ratings
Review scores
Source	Rating
Allmusic	3.5/5 stars
HipHopDX	3.0/5

Aron from HotNewHipHop was positive, writing, "The unflinching honesty, aggressive delivery, and bold melodies are a return to form for one of Louisiana's most consistent artists of the past decade." HipHopDX was more mixed, however, writing, "Even though a lot of the choices he makes throughout Khaza don't really work, there are moments when he lands an emotional gut punch. ... If [his latest freestyle] 'Super General' is any indication, Gates has figured out what he was trying to say, is processing his feelings and has proven he can come back more focused." AllMusic stated that "Third studio album Khaza amplifies the emotional intensity that marks Gates' best work as he explores the complex feelings of his long-term relationship ending. Heartbreak, vulnerability, and a conflicted mix of anger and longing run through much of Khaza."

== Commercial performance ==
On July 2, 2022, Khaza debuted at number eight on the US Billboard 200 with 40,000 album-equivalent units (including 3,000 pure album sales) in its first week, which became Kevin Gates' fifth US top-10 album debut. The album also debuted at number four on the US Top R&B/Hip-Hop Albums chart and at number two on the US Top Rap Albums chart, which also became his twelfth and eleventh top-10 albums on both charts overall. The album also accumulated a total of 47.05 million on-demand audio streams for its songs in its debut week.

== Track listing ==
Khaza track listing
No.	Title	Writer(s)	Producer(s)	Length
1.	"Intro"	Kevin Jerome Gilyard; Nick Seeley; Reuben Proctor	Nick Seeley; 2Much	3:30
2.	"Big Lyfe"	Gilyard; Tyler Williams	T-Minus	4:00
3.	"I'm in Love"	Gilyard; Gregory Sanders Jr.; Thomas Horton	HitmanAudio; TnTXD	2:49
4.	"PTOE"	Gilyard; Gerail Harvey	RellyMade	3:25
5.	"Steppin'"	Gilyard; Samuel David Jimenez; Westen Broek Weiss; Aubrey Robinson	Smash David; Westen Weiss; boobie	2:16
6.	"Bad for Me"	Gilyard; Christopher Dotson; Christopher Frank; Norman Payne	Chrishan; P Crisco; DJ Chose	2:24
7.	"Body"	Gilyard; Nicholas Mira	Nick Mira	2:37
8.	"Scars"	Gilyard; Kevin Andre Price; Norman Payne	DJ Chose; Go Grizzly	3:18
9.	"Mine"	Gilyard; Payne	DJ Chose	2:33
10.	"Shoot My Shot"	Gilyard; Djordje Stojanovic	Dzo Beatz	2:54
11.	"One Day"	Gilyard; Neil Kiran Muglurmath	Neil Muglurmath	3:21
12.	"Ups and Downs"	Gilyard; Denontae Xavier Wilson	Ghana 1k	3:06
13.	"Truth Be Told"	Gilyard; Mira	Nick Mira	3:38
14.	"Free at Last"	Gilyard; Gene Hixon; Matthew Edward Robinson; Cozy From Earth	Al Geno; Mattazik Muzik; Cozy From Earth	3:50
15.	"Hard to Sleep"	Gilyard; Malachi Haden; James Leonard Price	Aye YB; Sheffmade	2:24
16.	"You"	Gilyard; Evan Clauseille	ThatBossEvan	2:43
17.	"Black Clouds"	Gilyard; Kevin Andre Price; Charles Eric Driggers; Michael Tyrone Johnson	Go Grizzly; BricksDaMane	4:16
18.	"Plug Cry"	Gilyard; Matthew Paisley-Mallia	Patrick Carmelo	2:35
19.	"Thinking with My Dick" (featuring Juicy J)	Gilyard; Jordan Michael Houston III; Arthur McArthur; Tevin Keari Thompson	Arthur McArthur	2:45
Total length:				59:22

== Personnel ==
- Colin Leonard – mastering (1–18)
- John Will – mixing (1–10, 12–18)

== Charts ==
=== Weekly charts ===
Weekly chart performance for Khaza
Chart (2022)	Peak position
US Billboard 200	8
US Top R&B/Hip-Hop Albums (Billboard)	4

=== Year-end charts ===
Year-end chart performance for Khaza
Chart (2022)	Position
US Top R&B/Hip-Hop Albums (Billboard)	91
