= Thinking with My Dick =

Song by Kevin Gates featuring Juicy J

Single by Kevin Gates featuring Juicy J

from the album Stranger than Fiction and Khaza
- Released: July 16, 2013 (original release); March 18, 2022 (single re-release)
- Recorded: 2013
- Length: 2:45
- Label: Bread Winners' Association; Atlantic
- Songwriters: Kevin Gilyard; Jordan Houston III; Jeremy McArthur; Tevin Thompson
- Producer: Arthur McArthur

Kevin Gates singles chronology
"Dear God" (2021)	"Thinking with My Dick" (2022)	"Bad Man" (2022)

Juicy J singles chronology
"Pop That Trunk" (2021)	"Thinking with My Dick" (2022)	"Make America High Again" (2022)

"Thinking with My Dick" is a song by American rapper Kevin Gates from his tenth mixtape Stranger than Fiction (2013). It features American rapper Juicy J and was produced by Arthur McArthur. In March 2022, the song gained newfound popularity due to widespread use on the video-sharing app TikTok.

== Composition and critical reception ==
David Jeffries of AllMusic wrote, "jump right to the hedonistic 'Thinking with My D**k,' where the worlds of Pimp C and cloud rap collide, creating quite the druggy, strip-club spectacle." Derek Staples of Consequence of Sound regarded the song as misogynist, writing that it provides "a look back at Gates' vice-laden adolescence".

== TikTok use ==
On March 1, 2022, at a Mardi Gras celebration in Lafayette, Louisiana, local man John E. Weatherall III took a video of another man, Steven Barbosa, dancing and rapping to the song while holding an American flag cup, with a woman in the background clapping. The video was posted on TikTok and immediately went viral; the song became significantly used in many videos on TikTok. In March 2022, the song was re-released as a single and peaked at number 37 on the Billboard Hot 100. Gates added the song to his album Khaza (2022), increasing sales.

At a concert at the Cajundome around May 2022, Gates brought Barbosa with him onstage during his performance of the song.

== Charts ==
Chart performance for "Thinking with My Dick"
Chart (2022)	Peak position
Canada Hot 100 (Billboard)	40
Global 200 (Billboard)	49
US Billboard Hot 100	37
US Hot R&B/Hip-Hop Songs (Billboard)	11

== Certifications ==
Region	Certification	Certified units/sales
United States (RIAA)	Platinum	1,000,000^{‡}
^{‡} Sales+streaming figures based on certification alone.
