= Ain't Nothing =

Single by Juicy J featuring Wiz Khalifa and Ty Dolla Sign

from the album Rubba Band Business
- Released: February 3, 2017
- Genre: Hip-hop
- Length: 3:14
- Label: Taylor Gang, Kemosabe, Columbia
- Songwriters: Jordan Houston, Braylin Bowman, Aaquil Brown, Jerami Davis, Tyrone Griffin, Jr. Cameron Thomaz, Michael Williams II
- Producers: Mike Will Made It, Resource

Juicy J singles chronology
| "Ballin" (2016) | "Ain't Nothing" (2017) | "Gimme Gimme" (2017) |

Wiz Khalifa singles chronology
| "Sucker for Pain" (2016) | "Ain't Nothing" (2017) | "Gang Up" (2017) |

Ty Dolla Sign singles chronology
| "So Good" (2017) | "Ain't Nothing" (2017) | "Swalla" (2017) |

"Ain't Nothing" is a hip hop song by American rapper Juicy J, released on February 3, 2017 as the second official single from his fourth solo studio album Rubba Band Business (2017). The song features guest appearances from fellow artists Wiz Khalifa and Ty Dolla Sign.

== Music video ==
The official music video was released February 6, 2017.

== Charts ==
| Chart (2017) | Peak position |
|---|---|
| US Bubbling Under Hot 100 (Billboard) | 24 |
| US Bubbling Under R&B/Hip-Hop Singles (Billboard) | 2 |
