= The Ceremony (album) =

Studio album by Kevin Gates
- Released: January 26, 2024
- Genre: Hip-hop
- Length: 52:23
- Label: Atlantic; Bread Winners' Alumni
- Producer: 12Hunna; 3:02; BatGangBeats; BeatsByJuko; BJ Beatz; CashMoneyAP; Cheeze Beatz; Chuck Taylor; Daves; DJ Chose; Drum Dummie; Drumma Boy; Drumma Drama; Einer Bankz; EJ Grimes; Go Grizzly; Hardbody B-Eazy; Hardbody Heero; James Maddocks; Jamil "Millz" Alleyne; Jester Beats; JoeFromYO; JuanRa; Kuttabeatz; Macshooter; Mad Max; Melbeatz; Moneyxo; P Crisco; prodbyjm; Richie Souf; Starrah; VVS Beats; Wayv; YoungJody; Yung Lan; Zypitano

Kevin Gates chronology
Khaza (2022)	The Ceremony (2024)	I'm Him 2 (2025)

Singles from The Ceremony
- 1. "God Slippers" Released: October 6, 2023; 2. "Yonce Freestyle" Released: November 9, 2023; 3. "Birds Calling" Released: January 12, 2024

The Ceremony is the fourth studio album by American rapper Kevin Gates. It was released on January 26, 2024, via Atlantic Records and Bread Winners' Alumni. The album features guest appearances by B.G. and Sexyy Red and notable productions by CashMoneyAP, Drumma Boy, Go Grizzly and Richie Souf.

== Background ==
On October 25, 2023, Gates announced the release of his next studio album. He also revealed that the album would be called "The Ceremony".

== Singles ==
On August 10, 2023, Gates released a promotional single via YouTube, "Rumors". It was later included on the album. On October 6, 2023, he released the first official single from the album, "God Slippers". On November 9, 2023, he released the second official single from the album, "Yonce Freestyle". On January 12, 2024, he released the third official single from the album, "Birds Calling".

== Critical reception ==
Professional ratings
Review scores
Source	Rating
Pitchfork	6.7/10

Hattie Lindert of Pitchfork wrote that "where a more polished, pop-minded sound was jet fuel for Gates" on Islah (2016), "it's quicksand on The Ceremony. The writing is all about moving forward, but the sonics keep Gates frozen in time, fused to an outdated Hot 100 sound that's incongruous with his matured, quieter stylings".

== Track listing ==
The Ceremony track listing
No.	Title	Writer(s)	Producer(s)	Length
1.	"Ceremony"	Kevin Jerome Gilyard; Jamil Alleyne; Rijhay Derrick Sampson	Millz; Rijhay Derrick Sampson	2:56
2.	"Birds Calling"	Gilyard; Laquan Hazzard; Brittany Talia Hazzard; Aaron Revelle; Byron Ford; Keenan Melvin; Jacob Gago; Daniel Celestin; Servando Moquette; Stephen Norwood; Taylor Ross; Manuel Ligo	3:02; Starrah	3:08
3.	"Lil Yea"	Gilyard; Alleyne; Zachary Mullett; Christopher James Gholson; Jermaine Dupri Mauldin; Manuel L. Seal, Jr.; Brian Casey; Eduardo Gutiérrez del Barrio; Algenord Lanier Washington; Faheem Rashad Najm; Usher Raymond IV; Maurice White; Paul Philips; Verdine Adam White; Ferrell Wayne Miles	Millz; CHEEZE; Kutta	3:24
4.	"Yonce Freestyle" (featuring B.G. and Sexyy Red)	Gilyard; Christopher Noel Dorsey; Janae Nierah Wherry; Eric Grimes; Jesse Morris; Jacob Sclaver; Carlo Savina	EJ Grimes; Prodbyjm; Juko	3:44
5.	"Eater"	Gilyard; Norman Payne; Christopher Franck	P. Crisco; DJ Chose	2:46
6.	"Speed Dial"	Gilyard; Maximillian McFarlin; B. Hazzard; Juan Ramon Luis Melian; Rick Witherspoon	MadMaxx	2:27
7.	"God Slippers"	Gilyard; Raheem Hightowe; Jackie Lane Plant	Hardbody Heero; Hardbody B-Eazy	3:22
8.	"It Won't Happen"	Gilyard; Anthony Petit; Marvyn Houllier; Alex Christian Jean Petit	VVS Beats; Batgang beats; CashMoneyAP	2:57
9.	"Healing"	Gilyard; Shaun Thomas; Joseph Zomboulias; Davide Cobino	Chuck; JoeFromYO; Dave	2:54
10.	"Letter 2 My Fans"	Gilyard; Milan Sunil Modi; James Maddocks; Einer Banks; Spencer Harris	Jester Beats; Yung Lan; James Maddocks; Einer Bankz	2:32
11.	"Protect Children"	Gilyard; Kevin Price	Go Grizzly	2:40
12.	"Heal You"	Gilyard; Payne	DJ Chose	2:27
13.	"Walmart"	Gilyard; Tony Son	Richie Souf	3:20
14.	"Do It Again"	Gilyard; Christopher James Gholson	Drumma Boy	3:51
15.	"Rumors"	Gilyard; Melvin Stubbs; James Anthony Ellison; Jonathan Michael Tempesta; Tevin Revell	Chris Athens; Mel Beats; YoungJody; Dama Drumma; Drum Dummie	2:36
16.	"I Don't Apologize"	Gilyard; Brandon Jamal Russell; Michael O'Brien	12 Hunna; BJ Beatz	3:19
17.	"Broken Men"	Gilyard; Grimes	EJ Grimes; MoneyXO; Wayv	4:00
Total length:				52:23

Notes

- "Rumors" is stylized in all caps.

== Charts ==
Chart performance for The Ceremony
Chart (2024)	Peak position
US Billboard 200	24
US Top Current Album Sales (Billboard)	26
US Top Album Sales (Billboard)	32
US Top R&B/Hip-Hop Albums (Billboard)	8
US Top Rap Albums (Billboard)	7
US Top Streaming Albums (Billboard)	27
