= Show Out (Juicy J song) =

Single by Juicy J featuring Big Sean and Young Jeezy

from the album Stay Trippy
- Released: January 25, 2013
- Recorded: 2012
- Genre: Hip-hop
- Length: 4:33
- Label: Taylor Gang; Kemosabe; Columbia
- Songwriters: Jordan Houston; Jay Jenkins; Sean Anderson; Michael Williams; Justin Garner
- Producers: Mike WiLL Made It; J-Bo

Juicy J singles chronology
"We Still in This Bitch" (2013)	"Show Out" (2013)	"One of Those Nights" (2013)

Big Sean singles chronology
"Guap" (2012)	"Show Out" (2013)	"All That (Lady)" (2013)

Young Jeezy singles chronology
"Hold On (Shut Up)" (2012)	"Show Out" (2013)	"R.I.P." (2013)

Music video
- "Show Out" on YouTube

"Show Out" is a song by American rapper Juicy J. It was released on January 25, 2013, as the second single from his third studio album Stay Trippy (2013). The song, produced by Mike WiLL Made It and co-produced by J-Bo, features guest appearances from Big Sean and Young Jeezy. The song has peaked at number 75 on the US Billboard Hot 100.

== Background ==
The song premiered on November 30, 2012.

== Music video ==
The music video for "Show Out" was filmed on January 25, 2013, and was directed by Juicy J and Frank Paladino. On March 7, 2013, the music video for "Show Out" featuring Young Jeezy and Big Sean premiered on 106 & Park, with cameo appearances from Berner, Chevy Woods, Roscoe Dash, Mike WiLL Made It, and DJ Drama.

== Remix ==
The official remix was released on April 24, 2013, featuring verses from rappers T.I. and the late Pimp C.

== Track listing ==
Digital single

No.	Title	Writer(s)	Producer(s)	Length
1.	"Show Out" (featuring Big Sean and Young Jeezy)	Jordan Houston; Jay Jenkins; Sean Anderson; Michael Williams	Mike WiLL Made It	4:33

== Charts ==
=== Weekly charts ===
Chart (2013)	Peak position
US Billboard Hot 100	75
US Hot R&B/Hip-Hop Songs (Billboard)	23

=== Year-end charts ===
Chart (2013)	Position
US Hot R&B/Hip-Hop Songs (Billboard)	89

== Release history ==
Country	Date	Format	Label
United States	January 25, 2013	Digital download	Taylor Gang, Kemosabe, Columbia
