= Stranger than Fiction (mixtape) =

Stranger Than Fiction

Mixtape by Kevin Gates
- Released: July 16, 2013
- Recorded: 2013
- Genre: Hip hop; southern hip hop
- Length: 43:27
- Label: Bread Winners' Association, Atlantic
- Producer: Dun Deal; DJ Spinz; Arthur McArthur; LXG; Luney Tunez; David D.A. Doman; Sarah J; Mike Maven; Supaman; The Featherstones; REO; KB

Kevin Gates chronology
The Luca Brasi Story (2013)	Stranger Than Fiction (2013)	By Any Means (2014)

Stranger Than Fiction is the tenth mixtape by the American rapper Kevin Gates. It was published on July 16, 2013. The release peaked at number 37 on the US Billboard 200, selling 8,000 copies in the first week. The project was a contractual obligation with Breadwinners Records, after Gates had signed with Atlantic Records earlier in the year.

The track "Thinking with My Dick", featuring Juicy J, was re-released as a single in March 2022, debuting at and reaching number 37 on the Billboard Hot 100 chart on the week ending March 26, 2022. Subsequently, EDM remixes from Lovra and Ten Tonne Skeleton were released.

Professional ratings
Review scores
Source	Rating
AllMusic	4/5 stars

== Track listing ==
No.	Title	Producer(s)	Length
1.	"4 Legs and a Biscuit"	LXG; Sarah J	2:25
2.	"Get Em"	David D.A. Doman	3:31
3.	"MYB" (featuring Starlito)	David D.A. Damon	3:41
4.	"White Tan"	KB; Mike Maven; RBS	2:39
5.	"4:30am"	REO	2:46
6.	"Die Bout It"	Luney Tunez	4:30
7.	"Strokin'"	Dun Deal	3:01
8.	"Thinking with My Dick" (featuring Juicy J)	Arthur McArthur	2:45
9.	"Tiger"	Dun Deal	3:11
10.	"Smiling Faces"	The Featherstones	2:26
11.	"Careful"	Supaman, RBS	2:36
12.	"Money Magnet"	DJ Spinz; Dun Deal	3:06
13.	"Don't Know What to Call It"	DJ Spinz; Dun Deal	3:35
14.	"Satellites (HPG Remix)" (featuring Wiz Khalifa)		3:14
Total length:			43:27

=== Mixtape release ===
No.	Title	Producer(s)	Length
9.	"Change On Me" (featuring Percy Keith & Mista Cain)	Ric & Thadeus	4:47
10.	"Tiger"	Dun Deal	3:11
11.	"Smiling Faces"	The Featherstones	2:26
12.	"Patrick Swazy" (featuring Dreco)	Izze The Producer	3:49
13.	"Snake Nigga" (featuring Migos)	Mercy	3:42
14.	"Careful"	Supaman, RBS	2:36
15.	"Money Magnet"	DJ Spinz, Dun Deal	3:06
16.	"Don't Know What to Call It"	DJ Spinz, Dun Deal	3:35
17.	"Angels"	Go Grizzly	2:41
Total length:			58:26
