= Ballin (Juicy J song) =

2016 song performed by Juicy J

Single by Juicy J featuring Kanye West

from the album Rubba Band Business (intended)
- Released: September 28, 2016
- Genre: Hip-hop
- Length: 3:43
- Label: Kemosabe; Columbia
- Songwriters: Jordan Houston; Kanye West; Bryan Simmons; Gamal Lewis; Eddie Holman; Michael Foster; Kevin Gomringer; Tim Gomringer; Tauren Strickland
- Producers: TM88; Crazy Mike; Cubeatz

Juicy J singles chronology
"No English" (2016)	"Ballin" (2016)	"One Shot" (2016)

Kanye West singles chronology
"Fade" (2016)	"Ballin" (2016)	"Tiimmy Turner (remix)" (2016)

"Ballin" is a song by American rapper Juicy J featuring fellow American rapper Kanye West. It was released as a single on September 28, 2016, intended for his fourth album Rubba Band Business, however it was later cleared as a non-album single. The song was produced by TM88, Cubeatz and Crazy Mike, with writing handled by the trio alongside its performers, as well as co-writing by LunchMoney Lewis and Strick.

== Background ==
On September 23, 2016, five days belong the single was released, Juicy announced via Twitter that a viewing party would be available on TIDAL, which was streamed two days before its release. The track was supposed to be part of Juicy's fourth studio album Rubba Band Business, but didn't end up on the tracklist when the album was released in December 2017.

== Composition ==
For both the intro and outro of "Ballin", a sample of "I'm Not Gonna Give Up" by Eddie Holman is used. West's feature is minimal, since he only sings the chorus and Juicy J raps all of the verses.

== Music video ==
On September 29, 2016, one day after the song's release, the official music video for it was released. The video features both rappers performing the song in a warehouse.

== Release history ==
Region	Date	Format	Label	Ref.
Various	September 28, 2016	Digital download	Kemosabe; Columbia	
