= Hustle Till I Die =

Studio album by Juicy J
- Released: June 16, 2009
- Recorded: 2009
- Genres: Gangsta rap; crunk
- Label: Hypnotize Minds
- Producer: Juicy J

Juicy J chronology
Chronicles of the Juice Man (2002)	Hustle Till I Die (2009)	Stay Trippy (2013)

Singles from Hustle Till I Die
- 1. "30 Inches" Released: May 12, 2009; 2. "Ugh Ugh Ugh" Released: May 19, 2009; 3. "North Memphis Like Me (Remix)" Released: September 29, 2009

Professional ratings
Review scores
Source	Rating
AllMusic	3.5/5 stars
PopMatters	6/10
RapReviews	6.5/10

Hustle Till I Die is the second solo studio album by American rapper and record producer Juicy J. It was released on June 16, 2009 through Hypnotize Minds with distribution via Select-O-Hits. Produced by Juicy J himself, it features guest appearances from Project Pat, V-Slash, Gorilla Zoe, Gucci Mane and Webbie. The album peaked at number 106 on the Billboard 200, number 21 on the Top R&B/Hip-Hop Albums, number 9 on the Top Rap Albums and number 16 on the Independent Albums charts in the United States. The album was supported with three singles: "30 Inches", "Ugh Ugh Ugh" and "North Memphis Like Me (Remix)".

== Track listing ==
No.	Title	Length
1.	"Hustle Till I Die" (featuring V-Slash)	2:41
2.	"30 Inches" (featuring Gucci Mane and Project Pat)	4:07
3.	"Fiyayaya Weed" (featuring Project Pat)	3:03
4.	"North Memphis Like Me" (featuring V-Slash)	3:29
5.	"My Niggaz"	3:17
6.	"Ghost Dope"	3:21
7.	"Violent"	3:25
8.	"Lets Get High"	3:45
9.	"Ugh Ugh Ugh" (featuring Webbie and Project Pat)	3:58
10.	"You Niggaz Pussy" (featuring V-Slash)	2:58
11.	"Skit"	0:47
12.	"Real D Boyz"	2:33
13.	"Purple Kush" (featuring Gorilla Zoe and Project Pat)	3:29
14.	"Skit"	0:26
15.	"That What a Pimp Does"	3:12
16.	"Sell a Lot of Thangs"	2:56
17.	"You Can Get Murked"	3:46
18.	"Get Me Some Money" (featuring Project Pat and V-Slash)	3:38
19.	"Fuck All Ya'll" (featuring Project Pat and V-Slash)	3:49
20.	"Pimp Outro"	3:48

== Charts ==
Chart (2009)	Peak position
US Billboard 200	106
US Top R&B/Hip-Hop Albums (Billboard)	21
US Top Rap Albums (Billboard)	9
US Independent Albums (Billboard)	16
