= Chronicles of the Juice Man =

Studio album by Juicy J
- Released: July 16, 2002
- Genre: Memphis rap; gangsta rap; crunk; horrorcore
- Length: 50:37
- Label: North North; Street Level
- Producer: Juicy J; DJ Paul

Juicy J chronology
Chronicles of the Juice Man (2002)	Hustle Till I Die (2009)

Professional ratings
Review scores
Source	Rating
AllMusic	2.5/5 stars

Chronicles of the Juice Man is the debut studio album by American rapper Juicy J, released on July 16, 2002, via North North with manufacturing and distribution from Street Level. The album features guest appearances from Three 6 Mafia's Crunchy Black and Lord Infamous, as well as Juicy J's brother, Project Pat, whom many of the lyrics on the album and the album's cover art refer to following his then-recent incarceration.

== Track listing ==
- All tracks produced by Juicy J and DJ Paul

No.	Title	Length
1.	"Pimptro"	1:03
2.	"North, North Pt. 2" (featuring Project Pat)	3:41
3.	"Who Da Buckest" (featuring La Chat, Project Pat & Frayser Boy)	4:07
4.	"Gimme Head" (featuring La Chat & Frayser Boy)	3:46
5.	"Pimp Talk"	0:25
6.	"Like A Pimp" (featuring La Chat)	3:15
7.	"Killa Klan" (featuring Crunchy Black & Lord Infamous)	4:43
8.	"Smoke Dat Weed" (featuring Lord Infamous)	4:48
9.	"Buck Gangsta Beat" (Additional Vocals: Frayser Boy)	3:27
10.	"Mafia Niggaz" (featuring La Chat, Crunchy Black, Frayser Boy, DJ Paul & Lord Infamous)	4:17
11.	"Name It After Me / Outro" (featuring Frayser Boy)	6:11
12.	"Gimme Sum" (featuring La Chat & Frayser Boy)	4:16
13.	"Soldiers From The Northside"	2:51
14.	"Dick Suckin' Hoez"	3:50
Total length:		50:37

Sample credits

- "Smoke Dat Weed" samples "In The End" by Linkin Park.
- "Buck Gangsta Beat" samples "Papercut" by Linkin Park

== Chart positions ==
Chart (2002)	Peak position
US Billboard 200	93
US Top R&B/Hip-Hop Albums (Billboard)	17
US Independent Albums (Billboard)	4
