= Stay Trippy =

Studio album by Juicy J
- Released: August 27, 2013
- Recorded: 2011–2013
- Genre: Hip-hop
- Length: 61:37
- Labels: Taylor Gang; Kemosabe; Columbia
- Producers: Wiz Khalifa (exec.); Juicy J (also exec); Baby E; Crazy Mike; Cirkut; Dr. Luke (also exec.); DannyBoyStyles; ID Labs; Juicy J; J-Bo; Lex Luger; Mike Will Made It; Nineteen85; Recollect; Ritz Reynolds; Sap; Supa Dups; Timbaland; Young Chop

Juicy J chronology
Hustle Till I Die (2009)	Stay Trippy (2013)	TGOD Mafia: Rude Awakening (2016)

Singles from Stay Trippy
- 1. "Bandz a Make Her Dance" Released: September 11, 2012; 2. "Show Out" Released: January 25, 2013; 3. "Bounce It" Released: June 25, 2013; 4. "Talkin' Bout" Released: February 4, 2014

Stay Trippy is the third solo studio album by American rapper Juicy J. The album was released on August 27, 2013, by Dr. Luke's Kemosabe Records and Columbia Records. The album was Juicy J's first solo album since distancing himself from Three 6 Mafia and joining Wiz Khalifa's Taylor Gang Records, who makes three appearances on the album.

Stay Trippy's production was handled between 2011 and 2013 by producers such as Juicy J himself, Mike Will Made It, Cirkut, Lex Luger, Sap, Supa Dups, ID Labs, Timbaland and Young Chop, among others. The album also features additional guest appearances from Justin Timberlake, Chris Brown, Lil Wayne, 2 Chainz, The Weeknd, ASAP Rocky, Wale, Trey Songz, Young Jeezy, Big Sean, Pimp C, Trina, Yelawolf and Project Pat.

Stay Trippy was met with generally positive reviews from critics. The album debuted at number four on the US Billboard 200, selling 64,000 copies in the United States during its first week. As of November 6, 2013, the album has sold 138,000 copies according to Nielsen SoundScan. The album was supported by four official singles, the certified platinum "Bandz a Make Her Dance", "Show Out", "Bounce It" and "Talkin' Bout". The first three charted on the US Billboard Hot 100. He also went on the Stay Trippy Tour with ASAP Ferg beginning on April 20, 2013, till September 2013.

== Background and recording ==
After frequently collaborating with rapper Wiz Khalifa, Juicy J joined Taylor Gang Records in December 2011 as a part-owner and A&R representative. Soon after he started recording for his next studio album. On March 7, 2012, Juicy J stated his third studio album would be titled Stay Trippy. He went on to say that he has recorded many songs with rap group Odd Future. In late November 2012, Juicy J announced the album would be released in February 2013 and indicated an interest in working with Nas, Dr. Dre and Jay-Z. He also went on to say the album was almost finished. Juicy J had stated he recorded around 80 songs for the project, which were mostly recorded in hotel rooms while on tour. Complex ranked the album at number 22 on their list of the 50 most anticipated albums of 2013.

== Production ==
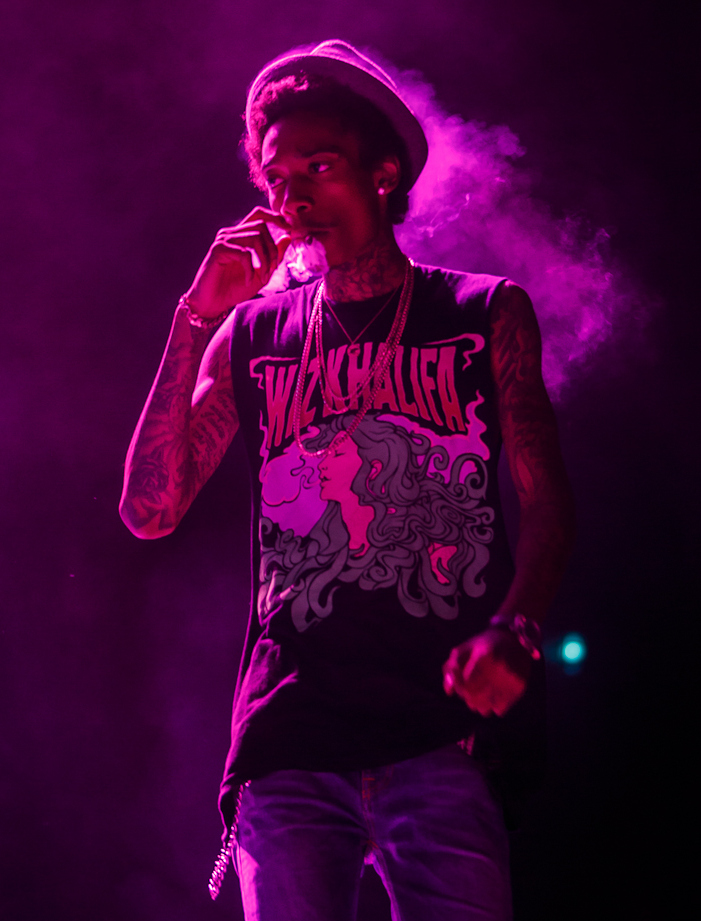
Rapper Wiz Khalifa, the founder of Taylor Gang Records, makes three guest appearances on the album.

Juicy J worked with various recording artists on the album including, Wiz Khalifa, The Weeknd, Lil Wayne, 2 Chainz, Nicki Minaj, Yelawolf, Chris Brown, Project Pat, Trey Songz, Maejor Ali, Young Jeezy and Big Sean. In addition to handling production himself, Juicy J also worked with producers Lex Luger, Sonny Digital, Mike Will Made It, Dr. Luke, Hit-Boy, Illangelo and Crazy Mike. In early April 2013, Juicy J told Billboard that there would be a "secret special feature" on the album he has yet to reveal.

Wiz Khalifa told Power 105 on April 18, 2013, that legendary rapper Pimp C would be featured on the album, and later on April 23 during an interview with DJ Whoo Kid he said that singer Justin Timberlake would make a guest appearance. Then on July 6, 2013, Juicy J confirmed production on the album would come from himself, Mike Will Made It, Dr. Luke, Lex Luger, Young Chop, Crazy Mike, Baby E, Timbaland, I.D. Labs and DannyBoyStyles, among others. In a press release on July 15, 2013, he confirmed the album would feature guest appearances from Wiz Khalifa, Justin Timberlake, Chris Brown, Lil Wayne, 2 Chainz, The Weeknd, ASAP Rocky, Wale, Trey Songz, Young Jeezy, Big Sean, Pimp C, Trina, Yelawolf and Project Pat.

== Release and promotion ==
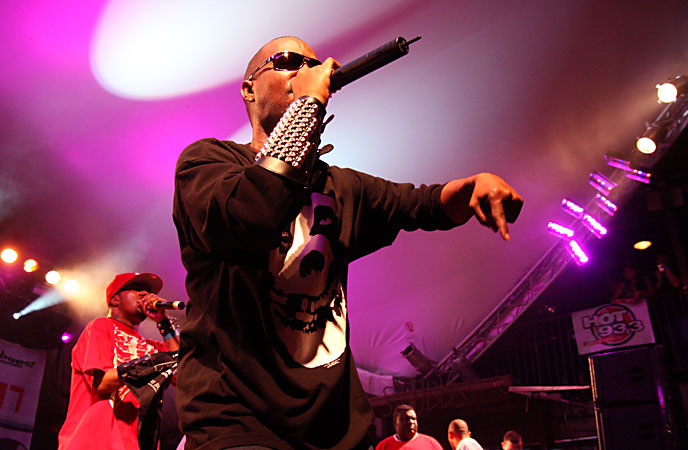
Juicy J released various mixtapes and toured in promotion of his third album Stay Trippy.

Prior to the album's release Juicy J released several mixtapes such as Rubba Band Business 1 & 2 and 2011's Blue Dream & Lean. Juicy J would go out with his street team to cities such as Atlanta, and passed out these mixtapes. On June 10, 2013, Juicy J announced he would be releasing a four track mixtape prior to the album titled, Wax. All the songs on the mixtape were reported to also have music videos, however that mixtape would not come to fruition, and "Wax" would end up being a track on Stay Trippy.

He worked as a supporting act along with the rest of Taylor Gang on Wiz Khalifa's 2050 Tour during late 2012 and early 2013. On March 13, Juicy J released the first of many Trippy Tour vlog episodes. Prior to the album's release Juicy J went on the Stay Trippy Tour from April 21 till June 8, 2013, with his opening act ASAP Ferg. He is also planning a possible college tour to take place after the album release.

In early February 2013 in an interview Juicy J reported the album would release near the end of March 2013. He would however push it back and on March 11, 2013, say the album would be released in June or July 2013. On April 29, he would announce a release date of July 2, 2013. However he would push it back again, till August, and on July 15 in a press release Juicy J announced a final release date for the album of August 27, 2013 in the United States. On July 21, 2013, the track listing and album cover was revealed. Its first release was on August 23, 2013, in other countries such as Australia.

In August 2013, Naima Cochrane (Juicy J's product manager at Columbia Records) told Billboard that "The Woods" featuring Justin Timberlake, could very possibly be a future single. She also said that there would be as many as three more singles after "Bounce It" from the album. On October 3, 2013, the music video was released for "All I Blow Is Loud". On October 31, 2013, the music video was released for "Stop It". On December 11, 2013, the music video was released for "No Heart No Love" featuring Project Pat. On July 18, 2014, the music video was released for "Scholarship" featuring ASAP Rocky. On August 26, 2014, the music video was released for "Smoke a Nigga" featuring Wiz Khalifa.

== Singles ==
The first single from the album is "Bandz a Make Her Dance", which was released on September 11, 2012. The single version features 2 Chainz and Lil Wayne. It was created in a hotel room in Washington, D.C. The song has peaked at number 29 on the US Billboard Hot 100. The music video premiered on MTV Jams on September 23, 2012. Several publications including The Washington Post and Complex magazine included the song among the top ten songs of 2012. The song was certified platinum by the RIAA for sales of over one million copies.

The second official single from the album was "Show Out" which features Big Sean and Young Jeezy. After its premiere on November 30, 2012, the song was released as a digital download on January 25, 2013. As with his previous single the song is produced by Mike Will Made It. The music video for "Show Out" was filmed on January 25, 2013, and was directed by Juicy J himself. On March 7, 2013, the music video for "Show Out" featuring Young Jeezy and Big Sean premiered on 106 & Park. The song has since peaked at number 75 on the US Billboard Hot 100. On April 24, 2013, the remix was released featuring verses from T.I. and the late Pimp C.

On February 16, 2013, it was announced that the third single was set to be "One Of Those Nights" featuring R&B singer The Weeknd. The song was produced by Canadian-producer Illangelo. It was premiered on February 20, 2013, via SoundCloud, and made available to purchase on March 11, 2013, as a promotional single. On June 20, 2013, the music video was released for "One Of Those Nights" featuring The Weeknd. However, the single failed to chart and ended up as an in store deluxe exclusive track.

On June 25, 2013, the third official single "Bounce It" featuring Trey Songz and Wale was released to iTunes. The music video was filmed on July 2, 2013. On July 18, 2013, the music video for "Bounce It" featuring Wale and Trey Songz premiered on 106 & Park. Since release the song has reached number 75 on the US Billboard Hot 100. Juicy J announced that "Talkin' Bout" featuring Chris Brown and Wiz Khalifa would be the album's fourth single on January 26, 2014. Then the following day the song was serviced to mainstream urban radio in the United States. On March 13, 2014, the music video was released for "Talkin' Bout" featuring Chris Brown and Wiz Khalifa.

== Commercial performance ==
The album debuted at number four on the US Billboard 200 chart, with first-week sales of 64,000 copies in the United States. In its second week of sale, the album dropped eleven spots on the US Billboard 200, and sold 22,000 more copies. In its third week the album sold 13,000 more copies. Then the following week it sold 8,000 more copies. As of November 6, 2013, the album has sold 138,000 copies according to Nielsen SoundScan. Outside of the United States, the album also enjoyed some chart success. In Canada it debuted at number 11 on the Billboard Canadian Albums Chart and spent one week on the chart. It also debuted at number 174 on the Official Charts Company's UK Albums Chart, and at number 17 on the UK R&B Chart.

== Critical response ==
Professional ratings
Aggregate scores
Source	Rating
Metacritic	66/100
Review scores
Source	Rating
AllMusic	4/5 stars
Artistdirect	4/5 stars
Exclaim!	6/10
Fact	3/5
HipHopDX	3.0/5
Now	2/5 Ns
RapReviews.com	7.5/10
Rolling Stone	3/5 stars
USA Today	2.5/4 stars
XXL	4/5

Stay Trippy received generally positive reviews from critics. At Metacritic, which assigns a normalized rating out of 100 to reviews from mainstream publications, the album received an average score of 66, based on 10 reviews. Al Shipley of the Baltimore City Paper gave the album a positive review, saying "Stay Trippy winds up as something of a triumph, one of the year's most thoroughly enjoyable major label albums." David Jeffries of AllMusic said, "Fans will need four or five hands to count all the other laugh-out-loud punch lines, and even if this album is redundant and overstuffed with hedonism and recklessness, that's just Juicy being Juicy." Rick Florino of Artistdirect stated, "Stay Trippy is as wild as modern hip-hop gets. It's a slick, seductive, and stone romp through a hazy synth boom, strip club-ready beats, and some of Juicy J's tightest rapping to date." Stacy-Ann Ellis of Vibe gave the album a positive review, saying "Despite the wild assortment of flows and flavors, Juicy J manages to avoid being eclipsed on his own project. Their presence only amplifies the quality of his offering, a hypothesis that is reinforced by three of the album's standout pieces." B.J. Steiner of XXL said, "Stay Trippy is a record that knows to stay within the lane that it's carved for itself. Big-budget stripper rap has rarely sounded so fresh." Nick Henderson of Tiny Mix Tapes gave the album three out of five stars, saying "On Stay Trippy, Juicy J sounds as energized, self-assured, and dangerous as ever." Patrick Taylor of RapReviews.com stated, "Even if Juicy J's brand of explicit hip-hop isn't your cup of syrup, you have to admire the man for staying relevant and good as he nears his third decade in the game."

Chris Kelly of Fact said, "By embracing the codeine-weed-molly trifecta, hashtag-friendly hooks, and — perhaps most significantly — ascendant producers, the 38-year-old rapper has maintained rap relevance, even as that has become more difficult than ever." Peter Marrack of Exclaim! stated, "For all its vulgarity, predictability, repetitiveness and reckless musings on drugs, Juicy J's trippy music succeeds because of its spirit." Julia LeConte of Now said, "The whole thing isn't about disrespecting women, though. Some songs merely weave the misogyny around simple-pleasure narratives: popping molly, making money. On his third solo record, the Three 6 Mafia rapper signed to Wiz Khalifa's Taylor Gang is 'getting high like he's 18.' At 38, though, it's not super-amusing, like J is the hip-hop Peter Pan refusing to grow up among a crew of younger emcees." Elysa Gardner of USA Today stated, "Stay Trippy can be musically compelling. Granted, the words are hard to miss. "Stay motivated, stay high, stay hustling, (forget) everything else," he intones on "So Much Money", a title that sums up the highest virtue in J's world." David "Rek" Lee of HipHopDX said, "Some Rap is tailor made for headphone listening and careful analysis of every word. Then there are songs that are meant to be played loud in public settings, and the lyrics don't matter so much. If you haven't already figured it out, Stay Trippy is the latter. And for as much flack as it receives, there is entertainment value there and it serves its purpose as a soundtrack to the 'trippy' lifestyle."

=== Accolades ===
Stay Trippy was ranked number 20 on Spin's list of the 40 best hip hop albums of 2013. They commented saying, "this is basically what the Juiceman's been doing for 20 years — self-producing albums of bellowing bass, eerie synths, and shouted slogans. It helps that his sound helped spawn wildly popular things like Atlanta trap and Chicago drill; it helps that Wiz Khalifa helped him acquire the budget to get an absolutely monstrous low end; and it helps that we're not sick of "Bandz a Make Her Dance." It was also positioned at number 27 on Complex's list of the 50 best albums of 2013. They said, "armed with an endless barrage of rattling beats, and a host of just-so-over-the-top-ridiculous-you-have-to-laugh punchlines, and enough believable gangsta talk to separate himself from the good kids of today's rap scene, Stay Trippy is the perfect explanation for why Juicy has been rich since the '90s." XXL ranked it at number 13 on their list of the best albums of 2014.

== Track listing ==
- Credits adapted from the liner notes of Stay Trippy.

No.	Title	Writer(s)	Producer(s)	Length
1.	"Stop It"	Jordan Houston	Mike Will Made It; Marz^{[a]}	3:21
2.	"Smokin' Rollin'" (featuring Pimp C)	Houston; Chad Butler; Cameron Thomaz; Abel Tesfaye; Adrien Gough; Henry Walter	Juicy J; Crazy Mike	2:36
3.	"No Heart No Love" (featuring Project Pat)	Houston; Patrick Houston; Kevin Woods	Young Chop	4:03
4.	"So Much Money"	Houston	Lex Luger; Juicy J^{[a]}; Crazy Mike^{[a]}	3:31
5.	"Bounce It" (featuring Wale and Trey Songz)	Houston; Olubowale Akintimehin; Lukasz Gottwald; Jacob Kasher; Ethan Lowery; Walter	Dr. Luke; Cirkut; Baby E	4:20
6.	"Wax"	Houston; Marilyn McLeod; Pamela Sawyer	Juicy J; Crazy Mike	3:33
7.	"Gun Plus a Mask" (featuring Yelawolf)	Houston; Michael Atha	Juicy J; Crazy Mike	3:23
8.	"Smoke a Nigga" (featuring Wiz Khalifa)	Houston; Thomaz	Mike Will Made It	4:17
9.	"Show Out" (featuring Big Sean and Young Jeezy)	Houston; Sean Anderson; Jay Jenkins	Mike Will Made It; J-Bo^{[a]}	4:29
10.	"The Woods" (featuring Justin Timberlake)	Houston; Justin Timberlake; Timothy Mosley	Timbaland	4:20
11.	"Money a Do It"	Houston	Juicy J; Crazy Mike	3:56
12.	"Talkin' Bout" (featuring Chris Brown and Wiz Khalifa)	Houston; Christopher Brown; Thomaz	ID Labs; Sap; Ritz Reynolds	4:21
13.	"All I Blow Is Loud"	Houston	Lex Luger	3:38
14.	"Bandz a Make Her Dance" (featuring Lil Wayne and 2 Chainz)	Houston; Dwayne Carter Jr.; Tauheed Epps; Michael Williams II; Justin Garner	Mike Will Made It; J-Bo^{[a]}	4:38
15.	"Scholarship" (featuring ASAP Rocky)	Houston; Rakim Mayers; Gamal Lewis; Ricky Witherspoon	Mad Max	3:29
16.	"If It Ain't"	Houston	Lex Luger	3:44
Total length:				61:37

Deluxe edition (bonus tracks)
No.	Title	Writer(s)	Producer(s)	Length
17.	"One Thousand" (featuring Wiz Khalifa)	Houston; Thomaz; Frederick Hibbert	Recollect	3:25
18.	"Having Sex" (featuring Trina and 2 Chainz)	Houston; Katrina Taylor; Epps; Dwayne Chin-Quee; Anthony Jefferies; Luther Campbell; Mark Ross; Chris Wong Won; David Hobbs	Supa Dups; Nineteen85^{[a]}	3:44
19.	"One of Those Nights" (featuring The Weeknd)	Houston; Tesfaye; Danny Schofield; Ahmad Balshe	DannyBoyStyles; The Weeknd	4:17
Total length:				73:03

Notes

- ^{^[a]} signifies a co-producer

Sample credits

- "Smokin' Rollin'" samples "High For This" performed by The Weeknd.
- "Wax" samples "I Get High (On Your Memory)" performed by Freda Payne.
- "One Thousand" samples "Just Like That" performed by Toots and the Maytals.
- "Having Sex" samples "If You Believe In Sex" performed by 2 Live Crew.

== Chart positions ==
=== Weekly charts ===
Chart (2013)	Peak position
Canadian Albums (Billboard)	11
UK Albums (OCC)	174
UK R&B Albums (Official Charts)	17
US Billboard 200	4
US Top R&B/Hip-Hop Albums (Billboard)	2

=== Year-end charts ===
Chart (2013)	Position
US Billboard 200	176
US Top R&B/Hip-Hop Albums (Billboard)	45
US Top Rap Albums (Billboard)	24

Chart (2014)	Position
US Top R&B/Hip-Hop Albums (Billboard)	43

== Release history ==
Region	Date	Format	Label
Australia	August 23, 2013	Digital download	Kemosabe, Columbia
Canada	August 23, 2013	Digital download	Kemosabe, Columbia
France	August 23, 2013	Digital download	Kemosabe, Columbia
Germany	August 23, 2013	Digital download	Kemosabe, Columbia
New Zealand	August 23, 2013	Digital download	Kemosabe, Columbia
Spain	August 23, 2013	CD, digital download	Sony
United Kingdom	August 23, 2013	Digital download	Kemosabe, Columbia
United Kingdom	August 27, 2013	CD	Kemosabe, Columbia
United States	August 27, 2013	CD, digital download	Kemosabe, Columbia
