= Bounce It =

Single by Juicy J featuring Wale and Trey Songz

from the album Stay Trippy
- Released: June 25, 2013
- Recorded: 2013
- Genre: Hip-hop
- Length: 4:22
- Label: Taylor Gang; Kemosabe, Columbia
- Songwriters: Jordan Houston; Olubowale Akintimehin; Lukasz Gottwald; Jacob Kasher Hindlin; Ethan Lowery; Henry Walter
- Producers: Dr. Luke; Cirkut; Baby E

Juicy J singles chronology
"Crazy Kids (Remix)" (2013)	"Bounce It" (2013)	"23" (2013)

Wale singles chronology
"Bad (Remix)" (2013)	"Bounce It" (2013)	"Poor Decisions" (2013)

Trey Songz singles chronology
"Simply Amazing" (2012)	"Bounce It" (2013)	"Na Na" (2014)

"Bounce It" is a song by American rapper Juicy J featuring fellow rapper Wale and singer Trey Songz, released on June 25, 2013, as the fourth single from the former's third solo studio album Stay Trippy (2013). It was written by its performers along with its producers—Dr. Luke, Cirkut and Baby E—as well as songwriter Jacob Kasher Hindlin. "Bounce It" peaked at number 74 on the Billboard Hot 100 and received gold certification by the Recording Industry Association of America.

== Music video ==
The music video (directed by Benny Boom) was filmed on July 2, 2013. On July 18, 2013, the music video premiered on BET's 106 & Park. Frequent collaborator Wiz Khalifa makes a cameo appearance in the video.

== Remix ==
The official remix features a verse by Wiz Khalifa and new verses by both Juicy J and Trey Songz & additional instrumentation to the song. It was released on November 20, 2013, on Juicy J's SoundCloud account. This remix has another version replacing the instrumental with a new rhythmic club beat dubbed the "Remix 2.0", which was released on the same day.

The remix originally feature a verse by Big Sean before being replaced by Wiz Khalifa's verse. This version was released on October 29, 2013, on Dr. Luke's SoundCloud account.

== Chart performance ==
Bounce It spent 19 weeks on the Billboard Hot 100, peaking at number 74. It also spent 14 weeks on Rhythmic radio, peaking at number 22.

=== Weekly charts ===
Chart (2013)	Peak position
US Billboard Hot 100	74
US Hot R&B/Hip-Hop Songs (Billboard)	25
US Rhythmic Airplay (Billboard)	22

=== Year-end charts ===
Chart (2013)	Position
US Hot R&B/Hip-Hop Songs (Billboard)	77

== Certifications ==
Region	Certification	Certified units/sales
United States (RIAA)	Gold	500,000^{‡}
^{‡} Sales+streaming figures based on certification alone.

== Radio and release history ==
Country	Date	Format	Label	Ref.
United States	June 25, 2013	Digital download	Taylor Gang, Kemosabe, Columbia	
United States	August 20, 2013	Rhythmic contemporary radio	Taylor Gang, Kemosabe, Columbia	
