= One of Those Nights (Juicy J song) =

Promotional single by Juicy J featuring the Weeknd

from the album Stay Trippy
- Released: March 11, 2013
- Recorded: 2013
- Genre: Hip-hop; R&B
- Length: 4:17
- Label: Taylor Gang; Kemosabe; Columbia
- Songwriters: Jordan Houston; Abel Tesfaye; Danny Schofield; Ahmad Balshe
- Producers: DannyBoyStyles; the Weeknd

Music video
- "One of Those Nights" on YouTube

"One of Those Nights" is a song by American rapper Juicy J featuring Canadian singer the Weeknd. It was released on March 11, 2013, intended as the third official single from his third solo studio album Stay Trippy but it was subsequently removed from the final track list (appearing in the later released deluxe edition). The song was written by Juicy J, Belly, The Weeknd, and DannyBoyStyles, while being produced by the latter two.

== Background ==
On February 16, 2013, it was announced that the third single from his album Stay Trippy was to be "One of Those Nights", featuring Canadian singer the Weeknd.

== Music video ==
On June 20, 2013, the music video was released. The video was directed by Sam Pilling.

=== Synopsis ===
The video begins with the Weeknd sitting in a bar table next to three girls as they are drinking and smoking together. Juicy J appears to be talking to a bartender at the front table on the same bar. A gunman wearing a mask comes running in and robs the bar. He hits one of the customers with the gun in the head while going around collecting everyone's money. When the gunman comes around to the Weeknd, he refuses to give up his money and laughs. This is followed by the gunman shooting the Weeknd, however Juicy J shoots the gunman before he can shoot the Weeknd. The video ends as Juicy J leaves the bar.

=== Critical reception ===
Pitchfork gave a negative review stating: "At this point you'd think Juicy J and the Weeknd would maybe try to switch things up a bit. But no. Their song "One of Those Nights" now has a dark-hued video in which they drink, smoke, and look sad while surrounded by women in a seedy-looking establishment. (There's a crime plot in this one, too). Hey, when you've picked a theme and found like-minded friends, you might as well run with it." Billboard complemented the video stating: "Instead of delivering what feels like today's typical rap video (women twerking in the club as rappers drop bills and sip on the alcohol they've recently co-signed), Juicy J gives fans a quick storyline to delve into in the video for his The Weeknd-assisted "One Of Those Nights."

== Track listing ==
Digital single

No.	Title	Writer(s)	Producer(s)	Length
1.	"One of Those Nights" (featuring the Weeknd)	Jordan Houston; Abel Tesfaye; Ahmad Balshe; Danny Schofield	Illangelo	4:17

== Chart performance ==
Chart (2013)	Peak position
US Bubbling Under R&B/Hip-Hop Singles (Billboard)	6

== Release history ==
Country	Date	Format	Label
United States	March 11, 2013	Digital download	Taylor Gang; Kemosabe; Columbia
