= The Hustle Continues =

Studio album by Juicy J
- Released: November 27, 2020
- Genre: Hip-hop
- Length: 47:25
- Label: Trippy; eOne
- Producer: Juicy J (also exec.)

Juicy J chronology
Rubba Band Business (2017)	The Hustle Continues (2020)	Mental Trillness (2023)

Deluxe cover
- Deluxe album titled The Hustle Still Continues

Singles from The Hustle Continues
- 1. "Gah Damn High" Released: July 31, 2020; 2. "Load It Up" Released: October 9, 2020; 3. "Spend It" Released: April 6, 2021

Professional ratings
Review scores
Source	Rating
NME	3/5 stars
Pitchfork	6.8/10

The Hustle Continues is the fifth solo studio album by American rapper Juicy J. It was released on November 27, 2020 via Trippy Music/eOne. It features guest appearances from Logic, 2 Chainz, ASAP Rocky, Conway the Machine, Jay Rock, Key Glock, Lil Baby, Megan Thee Stallion, NLE Choppa, Project Pat, Ty Dolla Sign, Wiz Khalifa, and Young Dolph.

The album was preceded by two singles: "Gah Damn High" and "Load It Up". Music videos were released for "Gah Damn High", directed by Joe Weil, "Load It Up", directed by Edgar Daniel and Juicy J, and "1995", directed by Mike Holland and Justin Fleischer.

A deluxe track listing for the album released on June 25, 2021, with nine new tracks and an alternative, rearranged track list. The deluxe album was titled The Hustle Still Continues.

== Track listing ==
The Hustle Continues track listing
No.	Title	Writer(s)	Producer(s)	Length
1.	"Best Group"	Jordan Houston III	Juicy J	3:00
2.	"Gah Damn High" (featuring Wiz Khalifa)	Houston III; Cameron Thomaz	Juicy J · Lex Luger	2:50
3.	"Spend It" (featuring Lil Baby and 2 Chainz)	Houston III; Dominique Jones; Tauheed Epps; Theron "Roc City" Thomas	Juicy J	3:18
4.	"Po Up" (featuring ASAP Rocky)	Houston III; Rakim Mayers	Juicy J	3:11
5.	"Killa" (featuring Conway the Machine)	Houston III; Demond Price; Bryan Williams; Byron Thomas; Christopher Dorsey	Juicy J	2:53
6.	"That's The Way It Goes" (featuring Key Glock)	Houston III; Markeyvius Cathey	Juicy J	3:14
7.	"Shopping Spree" (featuring Young Dolph)	Houston III; Adolph Thornton Jr.	Juicy J	3:18
8.	"1995" (featuring Logic)	Houston III; Sir Robert Bryson Hall II; Arjun Ivatory; Daniel Brantley; Derrick Ordogne; Dion Norman; Paul Beauregard; Todd Shaw	Juicy J · 6ix	2:50
9.	"What I Need"	Houston III	Juicy J	2:52
10.	"Shawty Bad" (featuring Logic)	Houston III; Hall II	Juicy J	2:42
11.	"Load It Up" (featuring NLE Choppa)	Houston III; Bryson Potts; Pharaoh; Side Pce	Juicy J · Taz Taylor · Pharaoh · Side Pce	2:57
12.	"She Gone Pop It" (featuring Megan Thee Stallion and Ty Dolla $ign)	Houston III; Megan Pete; Tyrone Griffin Jr.; Benjamin "TrapMoneyBenny" Workman; Derrick Milano	Juicy J · TrapMoneyBenny	2:44
13.	"Memphis to LA" (featuring Jay Rock and Project Pat)	Houston III; Johnny McKinzie; Patrick Houston	Juicy J	3:04
14.	"Datz What It Iz"	Houston III; Gilbere Forte	Juicy J	2:54
15.	"In a Min"	Houston III	Juicy J	3:20
16.	"I Can't Stop"	Houston III	Juicy J	2:18
Total length:				47:25

=== Deluxe track listing ===
The Hustle Still Continues track listing
No.	Title	Writer(s)	Producer(s)	Length
1.	"Gah Damn High" (featuring Wiz Khalifa)	Houston III; Cameron Thomaz	Juicy J · Lex Luger	2:49
2.	"Tell Em No" (featuring Pooh Shiesty)		Juicy J	2:31
3.	"Spend It" (featuring Lil Baby and 2 Chainz)	Houston III; Dominique Jones; Tauheed Epps; Theron "Roc City" Thomas	Juicy J	3:18
4.	"Load It Up" (featuring NLE Choppa)	Houston III; Bryson Potts; Pharaoh; Side Pce	Juicy J · Taz Taylor · Pharaoh · Side Pce	2:57
5.	"Take It" (featuring Lord Infamous and Rico Nasty)		Juicy J · 6ix	4:12
6.	"1995" (featuring Logic)	Houston III; Sir Robert Bryson Hall II; Arjun Ivatory; Daniel Brantley; Derrick Ordogne; Dion Norman; Paul Beauregard; Todd Shaw	Juicy J · 6ix	2:49
7.	"Talking to God" (featuring Henry AZ)		Juicy J	3:06
8.	"Po Up" (featuring ASAP Rocky)	Houston III; Rakim Mayers	Juicy J	3:10
9.	"Hustling & Grinding" (featuring Reylovesu & Duki)		Juicy J · Bone Collector · Danny Wolf	3:06
10.	"She Gon Pop It" (featuring Megan Thee Stallion and Ty Dolla $ign)	Houston III; Megan Pete; Tyrone Griffin Jr.; Benjamin "TrapMoneyBenny" Workman; Derrick Milano	Juicy J · TrapMoneyBenny	2:43
11.	"Kicked In"		Juicy J	2:25
12.	"Best Group"		Juicy J	2:59
13.	"Red Dot" (featuring Project Pat)		Juicy J	3:08
14.	"Shopping Spree" (featuring Young Dolph)	Houston III; Adolph Thornton Jr.	Juicy J	3:17
15.	"Burn Em Up"		Juicy J	3:03
16.	"Killa" (featuring Conway the Machine)	Houston III; Demond Price; Bryan Williams; Byron Thomas; Christopher Dorsey	Juicy J	2:52
17.	"What I Need"	Houston III	Juicy J	2:52
18.	"All the Time High" (featuring Kaash Paige)		Juicy J · Abaz · X-plosive · Habib Defoundoux · Bone Collector	2:00
19.	"Shawty Bad" (featuring Logic)	Houston III; Hall II	Juicy J	2:42
20.	"That's the Way It Goes" (featuring Key Glock)	Houston III; Markeyvius Cathey	Juicy J	3:14
21.	"Stop Cappin"		Juicy J · Grimm	2:35
22.	"Memphis to LA" (featuring Jay Rock and Project Pat)	Houston III; Johnny McKinzie; Patrick Houston	Juicy J	3:03
23.	"In a Min"	Houston III	Juicy J	3:20
24.	"Datz What It Iz"	Houston III; Gilbere Forte	Juicy J	2:54
25.	"I Can't Stop"	Houston III	Juicy J	2:17

== Charts ==
Chart performance for The Hustle Continues
Chart (2020)	Peak position
US Billboard 200	45
US Top R&B/Hip-Hop Albums (Billboard)	28
