= Bandz a Make Her Dance =

Single by Juicy J featuring Lil Wayne and 2 Chainz

from the album Stay Trippy and Blue Dream & Lean
- Released: September 11, 2012
- Recorded: 2012
- Genre: Dirty rap; trap
- Length: 4:40
- Label: Taylor Gang; Kemosabe; Columbia
- Songwriters: Michael Williams; Jordan Houston; Tauheed Epps; Dwayne Carter; Justin Garner
- Producers: Mike WiLL Made It; J-Bo

Juicy J singles chronology
"Piss Test" (2012)	"Bandz a Make Her Dance" (2012)	"Die Young" (2012)

2 Chainz singles chronology
"Do My Dance" (2012)	"Bandz a Make Her Dance" (2012)	"Fuckin' Problems" (2012)

Lil Wayne singles chronology
"No Worries" (2012)	"Bandz a Make Her Dance" (2012)	"Ball" (2012)

Music video
- "Bandz a Make Her Dance" on YouTube

"Bandz a Make Her Dance" is a song by American rapper Juicy J featuring fellow American rappers Lil Wayne and 2 Chainz. Produced by Mike WiLL Made It and co-produced by J-Bo, It was released on September 11, 2012, as the lead single from the former's third studio album Stay Trippy (2013).

== Background ==
Juicy J included an audio sample of himself in the song, from his prior work with Three 6 Mafia on the song "Mafia Niggaz". The song was originally included on the bonus track version of Juicy J's mixtape Blue Dream & Lean. It only features himself on the song. The official remix was released on November 13, 2012, with guest appearances by French Montana, Wiz Khalifa, B.o.B and LoLa Monroe.

== Music video ==
The music video, directed by J.R.Saint, premiered on MTV Jams on September 23, 2012 and features cameo appearances by Mike Will Made It and Project Pat. Alexis Texas appears in the music video wearing a t-shirt for adult film website Brazzers. She told Adam22 it was an enjoyable filming experience on the "Bandz a Make Her Dance" music video. Texas stated Juicy J was nervous to approach her and talk to her on the film set. She said 2 Chainz was present during her film shoot and he was respectful and kind to her during the production process. Her scenes were shot in an actual strip club; she performed a solo couch dance for the music video. Miami Northwestern Senior High School marching band members were featured in the music video; school district administrators voiced concerns over the usage in the video. According to the school district, administrators were informed it would be a music video featuring a drum line. The school district attempted to stop sales of the music video, asking Sony Music Entertainment and Kemosabe Records to halt the distribution. The music video's producer, Mahad Dar, sued Juicy J. in 2014 in United States District Court for the Central District of California; in his lawsuit he stated he was not paid under a "work for hire" agreement for his work on the production.

== Release ==
"Bandz A Make Her Dance" was released in May 2012 by Juicy J. In June 2012, he posted a link to Twitter of the remix version. The song quickly found success at dance clubs. Popularity on hip hop and R&B radio stations followed soon after. By September 29, 2012, the song had reached number 11 on Billboard Rap Songs list and number 14 on their Hip-Hop Songs chart, and sold 39,000 copies as reported by Nielsen SoundScan. The track debuted at number 26 on the list of Streaming Songs by Billboard on January 26, 2013.

== Reception ==
"Bandz a Make Her Dance" received a positive reception from Billboard, which wrote, "Three 6 Mafia member Juicy J has used the single 'Bandz A Make Her Dance' to grace the Billboard Hot 100 in a surprising reinvention that's not unlike the comeback of 2 Chainz, one of his featured guests on this remix." Billboard concluded, "Juicy J is a Southern hip-hop talent who deserves a legitimate shot at establishing a mainstream solo career. And, hey, that beat can sure make you dance." After the song's debut, it helped define Juicy J's newfound success as a solo artist. Juicy J used the attention he received from the song's success to leverage a signing deal with Dr. Luke's Kemosabe Records and Columbia. Luke commented to Billboard, "Juicy was already signed to Columbia, and they were gracious enough to say, 'Hey, let's do this together,'. I don't look at it as just this record. I look at it as a long-term relationship with an artist that I have a ton of respect for and believe in. I'd love to be involved." "Bandz a Make Her Dance" was named the third best song of 2012 by The Washington Post. Complex magazine named the song number six on their list of the best 50 songs of 2012. On December 27, 2012, Rap Genius ranked the song at No. 35 from "Rap Genius Presents: The Top 100 Rap Songs of 2012". Writing for Palimpsest: A Journal on Women, Gender, and the Black International, L.H. Stallings placed the work within the genre "strip club rap", and compared it to songs including "I Wanna Rock, "Look Back at Me", "Salt Shaker", "Make it Rain". Paryss A. Sherman cited the song in her work Primitivism and the Black form, as evidence of how hip hop culture objectifies black women.

== Charts ==
=== Weekly charts ===
Chart (2012–2013)	Peak position
US Billboard Hot 100	29
US Hot R&B/Hip-Hop Songs (Billboard)	6
US Rhythmic Airplay (Billboard)	10

=== Year-end charts ===
Chart (2012)	Position
US Hot R&B/Hip-Hop Songs (Billboard)	48
US Rap Songs (Billboard)	38

Chart (2013)	Position
US Hot R&B/Hip-Hop Songs (Billboard)	38
US Rap Songs (Billboard)	30

== Certifications ==
Region	Certification	Certified units/sales
United States (RIAA)	Platinum	1,000,000

== Release history ==
Country	Date	Format	Label
United States	September 11, 2012	Digital download	Taylor Gang, Kemosabe, Columbia
