= Blue Dream & Lean =

2011 mixtape by Juicy J

Mixtape by Juicy J
- Released: November 29, 2011
- Genre: Hip-hop
- Length: 1:19:51
- Labels: Trippy Music; Stem
- Producers: A-One; Big Jerm; "Crazy" Mike Foster; DJ Scream; Drumma Boy; Harry Fraud; ID Labs; Juicy J; Key!; Lex Luger; Sonny Digital; Young Ced
- Compiler: DJ Scream

Blue Dream & Lean is the eleventh mixtape by American rapper Juicy J. It was released through Trippy Music under exclusive distribution licensing to Stem Distribution on November 29, 2011.

== Critical reception ==
Professional ratings
Review scores
Source	Rating
Fact	4/5
Pitchfork	5.7/10
XXL	L

Tam Gunn of Fact said that Juicy J "raps about drugs, money and sex, and he's very good at it". Jordan Sargent of Pitchfork said it "could be chopped in half and be no worse for the wear, but that's par for the course". Neil Martinez-Belkin of XXL said it "ends up being another Juicy J mixtape that's just truly hard not to enjoy".
