= Arthur McArthur =

- Born: Jeremy Jonathan McArthur; October 29, 1988 (age 37); Toronto, Ontario, Canada
- Origin: Toronto, Ontario, Canada
- Genres: Hip hop
- Occupation: Record producer
- Instrument(s): Keyboard, drum machine, sampler
- Years active: 2008−present
- Labels: Ringleader Music Group

Jeremy McArthur (born October 29, 1988), known professionally as Arthur McArthur, is a Grammy-nominated Canadian record producer from Toronto, Ontario. A classically trained piano and guitar player, he has been involved in music producing since 2008. He has worked with artists such as Drake, Big Boi, Rick Ross, Tyga, Big Sean, Kelly Rowland, Dr. Dre, and Logic, among others.

== Career ==
McArthur grew up in Toronto, Ontario, Canada and received a formal training in piano. After leaving high school, he spent a year studying Western civilizations at university but dropped out and enrolled in the music program at Humber College instead. During his studies he collaborated with the local hip-hop producer Boi-1da, contributing to the song "Uptown" that featured on the So Far Gone EP by Drake. McArthur left education to pursue his interest in music, combining his classical training with an interest in hip-hop and rap. In Toronto he worked with JD Era, Son Real, and Rich Kidd.

In 2012 McArthur co-wrote and produced a number of interludes and the song "Kings & Queens" on Careless World: Rise Of The Last King by Tyga, while in the same year he contributed to the song "Rasberries" on Vicious Lies And Dangerous Rumors by Big Boi. He produced the comedy rap troupe The Lonely Island in 2013 and produced/co-wrote the song "This Is Love" on the Kelly Rowland album Talk a Good Game. The album charted in the top 10 of the Billboard 200. A year earlier, McArthur had also produced the Rick Ross track "Mind Games" that feature Rowland. In 2013 he also produced the track "Wide Open" for the B.o.B. album Underground Luxury, continuing the collaboration on the song "Confucious" featured on Psycadelik Thoughtz released in 2015.

McArthur worked with a number of acts contracted under the rapper and producer DJ Khaled, including Ace Hood. In 2013, he produced the song "Helen Keller" on Khaled's album Suffering from Success.

In 2014, he produced "The Sleaze" on Blacc Hollywood by Wiz Khalifa, which was nominated for a Grammy in 2015.

== Mixtapes ==
During his career McArthur also contributed to a number mixtapes, including Wrath of Caine (2013) by Pusha T, Good Nights & Bad Mornings 2 by Snow That Product, Welcome to Forever by Logic and Stranger Than Fiction by Kevin Gates.

== Discography ==
Year	Song	Album	Artist	Credits
2009	"Uptown"	So Far Gone	Drake	producer
2012	"Echoes Interlude" "Birdman Interlude" "Mystic Aka Mado Kara Mieru Interlude" "Kings & Queens"	Careless World: Rise Of The Last King	Tyga	producer/writer
2012	"Rasberries"	Vicious Lies And Dangerous Rumors	Big Boi	producer
2012	"Mind Games" (featuring Kelly Rowland) "MMG Untouchable"	Rich Forever	Rick Ross	producer
2013	"The Compliments" (featuring Too Short)	The Wack Album	The Lonely Island	producer
2013	"This Is Love"	Talk A Good Game	Kelly Rowland	producer/writer
2013	"Wide Open"	Underground Luxury	B.o.B.	producer
2013	"The Come Up" (featuring Anthony Hamilton)	Trials & Tribulations	Ace Hood	producer
2013	"Helen Keller"	Suffering From Success	DJ Khaled	
2013	''Ballin'' (featuring Castro)		Logic (musician)	producer
2014	" The Sleaze"	Blacc Hollywood	Wiz Khalifa	producer
2015	"Confusious"	Psycadelik Thoughtz	B.oB.	producer
2016	''No Romeo No Juliet'' (featuring Chris Brown)	Kanan: Reloaded	50 Cent	producer
