= Rubba Band Business =

Studio album by Juicy J
- Released: December 8, 2017
- Recorded: The Peabody Hotel and D-Brady Studios (Memphis, Tennessee); House of Blues Studio (Encino, California); Mo Faces Studios (Los Angeles); MSM Productions (Studio City, California)
- Genres: Hip-hop; trap
- Length: 40:54
- Labels: Taylor Gang; Kemosabe; Columbia
- Producers: Juicy J (also exec.); Wiz Khalifa (exec.); Ben Billions; DannyBoyStyles; Deedotwill; G Koop; Lex Luger; Metro Boomin; Murda Beatz; Mike Will Made It; R. City; Resource; Tarentino; TM88; YK808

Juicy J chronology
Highly Intoxicated (2017)	Rubba Band Business (2017)	The Hustle Continues (2020)

Singles from Rubba Band Business
- 1. "No English" Released: June 17, 2016; 2. "Ain't Nothing" Released: February 3, 2017; 3. "Flood Watch" Released: August 4, 2017

Rubba Band Business is the fourth studio album by American rapper Juicy J, released on December 8, 2017, by Kemosabe Records, Columbia Records and Taylor Gang Records. It features guest appearances from Travis Scott, ASAP Rocky, Ty Dolla Sign, and Offset, among others. The album was preceded by three singles: "No English", "Ain't Nothing" and "Flood Watch".

== Background ==
The album was announced in August 2016. The album's tracklist and release date was revealed on November 13, 2017.

== Singles ==
The album's lead single, "No English" featuring Travis Scott was released on June 17, 2016. The second single, "Ain't Nothing" featuring Wiz Khalifa and Ty Dolla Sign was released on February 3, 2017. The third single, "Flood Watch" featuring Offset was released on August 4, 2017.

== Track listing ==
Credits adapted from the album's liner notes.

Rubba Band Business
No.	Title	Writer(s)	Producer(s)	Length
1.	"Back on the Porch"			0:39
2.	"Feed the Streets" (featuring Project Pat and ASAP Rocky)	Jordan Houston; Patrick Houston; Rakim Mayers; Leland Wayne; Robert Mandell; Jerami Davis	Juicy J; Metro Boomin; G Koop	4:21
3.	"A Couple"	J. Houston; Davis; Chance Youngblood	Tarentino	3:03
4.	"Buckets"	J. Houston; Davis; Lexus Lewis	Lex Luger	3:15
5.	"Dodgin' the Snakes"	J. Houston; Davis; Chris O'Neal	YK808	2:00
6.	"Drop a Bag" (featuring G.O.D.)	J. Houston; Davis; Wayne; Mandell	Metro Boomin; G Koop	3:52
7.	"Too Many" (featuring Wiz Khalifa and Denzel Curry)	J. Houston; Cameron Thomaz; Denzel Curry; Shane Lindstrom	Murda Beatz	2:56
8.	"Ain't Nothing" (featuring Wiz Khalifa and Ty Dolla Sign)	J. Houston; Thomaz; Tyrone Griffin, Jr.; Michael Williams II; Aaquil Brown; Davis; Braylin Bowman	Mike Will Made It; Resource	3:15
9.	"Flood Watch" (featuring Offset)	J. Houston; Kiari Cephus; Quavious Marshall; Bryan Simmons; Davis	TM88	3:44
10.	"Only One Up"	J. Houston; Davis; O'Neal	YK808	2:37
11.	"Hot as Hell"	J. Houston; Davis; Keondrea Williams	Deedotwill	3:26
12.	"No English" (featuring Travis Scott)	J. Houston; Jacques Webster; Davis; Lewis; Simmons	Lex Luger; TM88	4:01
13.	"On & On" (featuring Tory Lanez and Belly)	J. Houston; Daystar Peterson; Ahmad Balshe; Davis; Benjamin Diehl; Danny Schofield; Melvin Hough II; Rivelino Wouter	Juicy J; DannyBoyStyles; R. City; Ben Billions	3:45
Total length:				40:24

== Personnel ==
Credits adapted from the album's liner notes.

Performers

- Juicy J – primary artist
- Project Pat – featured artist (track 2)
- ASAP Rocky – featured artist (track 2)
- G.O.D. – featured artist (track 6)
- Wiz Khalifa – featured artist (tracks 7, 8)
- Denzel Curry – featured artist (track 7)
- Ty Dolla Sign – featured artist (track 8)
- Offset – featured artist (track 9)
- Travis Scott – featured artist (track 12)
- Tory Lanez – featured artist (track 13)
- Belly – featured artist (track 13)

Technical

- Crazy Mike – recording engineer (all tracks)
- Kevin Nix – mastering engineer (all tracks)
- Hector Delgado – recording engineer (tracks 2, 11)
- Alex Tumay – mixing engineer (tracks 2, 5–7, 9, 11)
- Gordie Tumay – assistant mixing engineer (tracks 2, 5–7, 9, 11)
- Eric Dan – mixing engineer (tracks 3, 4)
- Resource – recording engineer (track 8)
- Jaycen Joshua – mixing engineer (tracks 8, 10, 12, 13)
- Maddox Chhim – assistant mixing engineer (tracks 8, 12, 13)
- Jordan Lewis – recording engineer (track 12)
- David Nakaji – assistant mixing engineer (tracks 12, 13)

Production

- Metro Boomin – producer (tracks 2, 6)
- G Koop – producer (tracks 2, 6)
- Tarentino – producer (track 3)
- Lex Luger – producer (tracks 4, 12)
- YK808 – producer (tracks 5, 10)
- Murda Beatz – producer (track 7)
- Mike Will Made It – producer (track 8)
- Resource – producer (track 8)
- TM88 – producer (tracks 9, 12)
- Deedotwill – producer (track 11)
- Ben Billions – producer (track 13)
- DannyBoyStyles – producer (track 13)
- R. City – producer (track 13)

Additional personnel

- Juicy J – executive producer
- Wiz Khalifa – executive producer
- April Pope – marketing
- ASAP Rocky – art direction and design
- Robert Gallardo – art direction and design
- Niko Nice – art direction and design
- Awol Erizku – photography
- Sammy K – styling

== Charts ==
Chart (2017)	Peak position
US Billboard 200	191
