= Juicy J =

American rapper (born 1975)

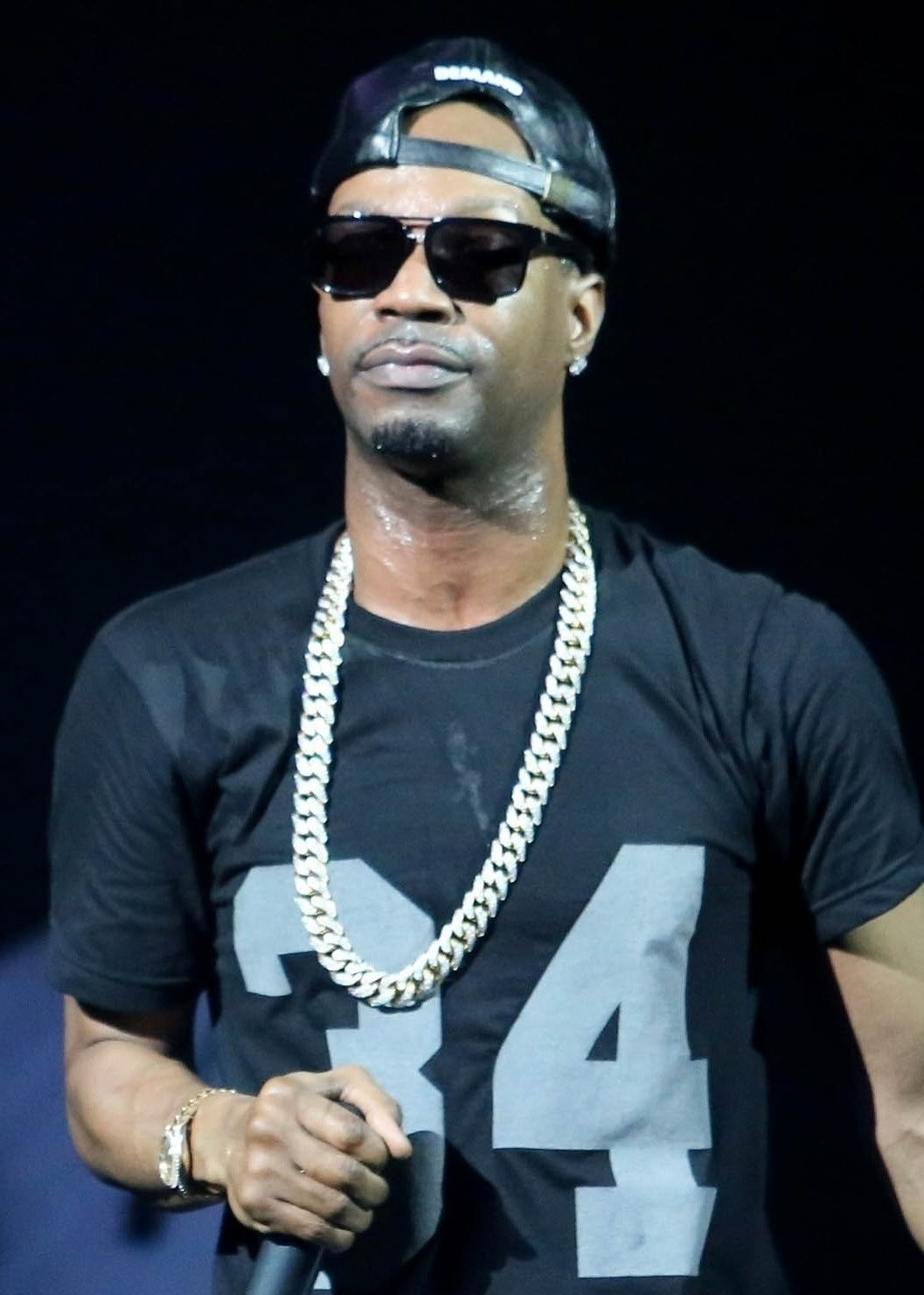
- Juicy J performing in 2014
- Born: Jordan Michael Houston III; April 5, 1975 (age 51); Memphis, Tennessee, U.S.
- Other names: The Checkwriter; Low Down; Juice Manne
- Occupations: Rapper; songwriter; record producer; disc jockey; record executive
- Years active: 1991–present
- Works: Discography; production
- Spouse: Regina Perera (m. 2016)
- Children: 2
- Relatives: Project Pat (brother)
- Awards: Full list
- Musical career
- Genres: Southern hip-hop; Memphis rap; crunk; trap; horrorcore
- Labels: Trippy Music; E1; Kemosabe; Taylor Gang; Columbia; Hypnotize Minds; North North; Select-O-Hits; Street Level
- Member of: TGOD Mafia; Three 6 Mafia

Jordan Michael Houston III (born April 5, 1975), known professionally as Juicy J, is an American rapper and record producer. Originally from Memphis, Tennessee, he is a founding member of the Southern hip-hop group Three 6 Mafia, established in 1991. He released ten studio albums with the group, which began as an underground act until attaining mainstream recognition and signing with Loud Records, an imprint of Columbia Records in 2000. The group's 2005 single, "Stay Fly", yielded their furthest commercial success, peaking at number 13 on the Billboard Hot 100. That same year, they recorded the song "It's Hard out Here for a Pimp" for the film Hustle & Flow, which won an Academy Award for Best Original Song.

His first two studio albums, Chronicles of the Juice Man (2002) and Hustle Till I Die (2009), were self-released in between Three 6 Mafia projects. He further pursued his solo career during the group's hiatus in 2011, signing with Dr. Luke's Kemosabe Records, an imprint of Columbia Records, and Wiz Khalifa's Taylor Gang Entertainment (as both a recording artist and A&R) the following year. His 2012 single, "Bandz a Make Her Dance" (featuring Lil Wayne and 2 Chainz), peaked within the top 40 of the Billboard Hot 100 and led his third album and major label debut, Stay Trippy (2013), which peaked at number four on the Billboard 200. In the following two years, he guest appeared on the hit singles "23" by Mike Will Made It, "I Don't Mind" by Usher, "She Knows" by Ne-Yo, and the Grammy Award-nominated "Dark Horse" by Katy Perry, the latter of which peaked atop the Billboard Hot 100. His fourth album, Rubba Band Business (2017), was met with commercial failure, and he returned to an independent career with his fifth album, The Hustle Continues (2020).

Alongside recording, Juicy J has been prolific in production work for other artists—having largely handled the production on Three 6 Mafia projects with DJ Paul—with credits on singles or albums for Lil Wayne, Nicki Minaj, Megan Thee Stallion, T.I., Ludacris, Sexyy Red, GloRilla, and Chief Keef, among others. He is the younger brother of frequent collaborator and fellow Memphis rapper Project Pat.

== Early life ==
Jordan Michael Houston III was born on April 5, 1975, in Memphis, Tennessee. As a teenager, he read a multitude of books and essays on the music industry, learning about marketing, publishing, and royalties. He looked up to fellow Tennessee artist, Al Bell, who was the brief co-owner of Stax Records.

Houston attended Northside High School in the Klondike neighborhood of Memphis, where he wrote the lyrics for Three 6 Mafia's song "Slob on My Knob" in the eleventh grade.

== Career ==
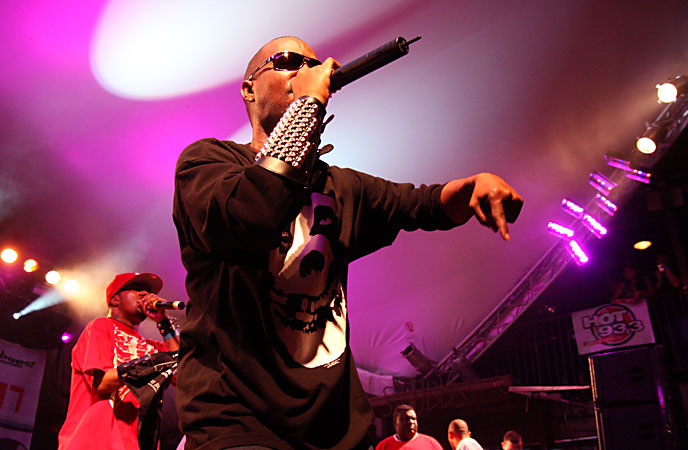
Juicy J performing in 2007

=== 1991–2009: Career beginnings with Three 6 Mafia ===
In 1991, Juicy J was a co-founder of the Southern hip-hop group now known as Three 6 Mafia. Along with DJ Paul and Lord Infamous, rappers Crunchy Black, Gangsta Boo and Koopsta Knicca. Alongside DJ Paul, Juicy J has launched Prophet Entertainment. In 1994, they left the label to their business partner Nick "Scarfo" Jackson and subsequently launched Hypnotize Minds. In 1995, the group released their first official album called Mystic Stylez. Since then the group has released 8 albums. On July 2, 2002, he released his solo debut studio album Chronicles of the Juice Man, under North North Records. In 2006, Juicy J, along with DJ Paul, Crunchy Black, and Frayser Boy, won an Academy Award for Best Original Song for "It's Hard out Here for a Pimp" at the 78th Academy Awards. On June 16, 2009, his second studio album Hustle Till I Die, was released under Hypnotize Minds and Select-O-Hits.

=== 2010–2017: Taylor Gang, Stay Trippy and Rubba Band Business album ===
From 2009 through 2011, Juicy J moved away from Three 6 Mafia, focusing on his solo career. During this time, he frequently collaborated with Wiz Khalifa, appearing on his mixtapes and releasing some of his own, including Blue Dream & Lean. In December 2011, Juicy J confirmed rumors about him as the newest member of Wiz Khalifa's Taylor Gang imprint, a part-owner and A&R representative. In 2012, he was featured alongside his Taylor Gang label-mates, on the cover of Source Magazine's May 2012 issue. In 2012, he released the lead single to his third album Stay Trippy, the chart topping "Bandz a Make Her Dance", which features guest appearances from 2 Chainz and Lil Wayne. The song was created in a two-bedroom apartment in Washington, D.C., and was produced by Mike Will Made It. The song peaked at number 29 on the US Billboard Hot 100.

In September 2012, Juicy J secured a recording contract with Columbia Records and Dr. Luke's Kemosabe Records. In November 2012, Juicy J announced his third studio album Stay Trippy would be released in 2013. He had shown some interest in working with Nas, Dr. Dre and Jay-Z on the album. He later announced that guest appearances on the album would include Wiz Khalifa, The Weeknd, Lil Wayne, 2 Chainz, Nicki Minaj, Chris Brown, Project Pat, Young Jeezy, Yelawolf and Big Sean. Juicy J revealed the album would feature production from frequent collaborators Lex Luger, Sonny Digital, Mike Will Made It, Dr. Luke, and Crazy Mike.

On January 20, 2013, it was announced Juicy J would perform at the 2013 Paid Dues festival on March 30, 2013. On January 25, 2013, he released "Show Out" featuring Big Sean and Young Jeezy, as the second single from Stay Trippy. In June 2013, the album's third single "Bounce It", was released. The album was released on August 23, 2013, when it debuted at number 4 on the Billboard 200, with first-week sales of 64,000 copies in the United States. On September 10, 2013, Juicy J was featured on the song "23" by Mike Will Made It, alongside Miley Cyrus and Wiz Khalifa.

Juicy J was featured on Katy Perry's single "Dark Horse" from her fourth album Prism (2013). The song was released on September 17, 2013. "Dark Horse" was serviced to U.S. radio on December 17 as the album's third single. On January 7, 2014, Juicy J announced his fourth studio album would be released in 2014. Initially, he announced the title of this album would be The Hustle Continues. On January 30, 2013, Juicy J announced his "Never Sober" concert tour, which began on February 20, 2014. He was supported by Travis Scott and Project Pat on select dates.

On August 7, 2014, he released the song, titled "Low" featuring Nicki Minaj, Lil Bibby and Young Thug. On April 14, 2015, he released the song, titled "For Everybody" featuring Wiz Khalifa and R. City.

On August 5, 2016, Juicy J announced a new album Rubba Band Business (named after his acclaimed mixtape series) which was set to debut in the fall of 2016. He released a new single "No English" featuring Travis Scott. On September 28, 2016, Juicy J released a new song "Ballin" with Kanye West on the hook. On November 21, 2016, Juicy J premiered a new song, "Gimme Gimme" featuring Slim Jxmmi of Rae Sremmurd, prod. by Mike Will Made It and Resource of Ear Drummers.

On September 18, 2017, Juicy J released a mixtape called Highly Intoxicated featuring production largely by rap duo Suicideboys, to whom he has acted as an idol and mentor. On December 8, 2017, Juicy J released the album Rubba Band Business.

=== 2018–present: New label and The Hustle Continues ===
Throughout late 2018 and 2019, he released the standalone singles "Neighbor" featuring Travis Scott, "Let Me See" featuring Lil Skies and Kevin Gates, and "Three Point Stance" featuring City Girls and Megan Thee Stallion. The songs failed to gain traction commercially and Juicy J was granted release from his recording contract from Columbia Records. On July 31, 2020, Juicy J announced his fifth studio album would be called The Hustle Continues (previously used for a prior scrapped 2014 album title) and released "Gah Damn High" featuring Wiz Khalifa as the lead single through his new label Entertainment One.

On February 9, 2024, Juicy J was featured on Jermaine Dupri's single "This Lil' Game We Play"; the single also featured Nelly and Ashanti.

On July 10, 2026, Juicy J released a collaboration album with Project Pat titled DEM GOATS.

== Personal life ==
In July 2016, Houston married longtime girlfriend Regina Perera. They have a daughter born in 2018 and a son born in 2020.

On January 10, 2025, the son of Project Pat and Houston's nephew, Patrick Houston Jr., was fatally shot in the Imogene Heights neighborhood of Memphis.

== Discography ==
Studio albums

- Chronicles of the Juice Man (2002)
- Hustle Till I Die (2009)
- Stay Trippy (2013)
- Rubba Band Business (2017)
- The Hustle Continues (2020)
- Ravenite Social Club (2024)

Collaborative albums

- Rude Awakening (with Wiz Khalifa and TM88 as TGOD Mafia) (2016)
- Stoner's Night (with Wiz Khalifa) (2022)
- Space Age Pimpin (with Pi'erre Bourne) (2022)
- Memphis Zoo (with Xavier Wulf) (2024)
- Live and in Color (with Logic) (2025)
- DEM GOATS (with Project Pat) (2026)

== Awards and nominations ==
| Year | Awards | Category | Recipient | Result |
|---|---|---|---|---|
| 2006 | Academy Awards | Best Original Song | "It's Hard out Here for a Pimp" (with Frayser Boy, Crunchy Black, and DJ Paul as a member of Three 6 Mafia) | Won |
| 2012 | HipHopDX Year-end Awards | Comeback of the Year | Juicy J | Won |
| 2013 | BET Hip Hop Awards | Best Hip-Hop Video | "We Still in This Bitch" (with B.o.B and T.I.) | Nominated |
| 2014 | World Music Awards | World's Best Song | "23" (with Mike Will Made It, Miley Cyrus and Wiz Khalifa) | Nominated |
| 2014 | World Music Awards | World's Best Video | "23" (with Mike Will Made It, Miley Cyrus and Wiz Khalifa) | Nominated |
| 2014 | World Music Awards | World's Best Song | "Dark Horse" (with Katy Perry) | Nominated |
| 2014 | World Music Awards | World's Best Video | "Dark Horse" (with Katy Perry) | Nominated |
| 2014 | MTV Europe Music Awards | Best Song | "Dark Horse" (with Katy Perry) | Nominated |
| 2014 | MTV Europe Music Awards | Best Video | "Dark Horse" (with Katy Perry) | Won |
| 2014 | American Music Awards | Single of the Year | "Dark Horse" (with Katy Perry) | Won |
| 2015 | Grammy Awards | Best Pop Duo/Group Performance | "Dark Horse" (with Katy Perry) | Nominated |
| 2015 | Nickelodeon Kids' Choice Awards | Favorite Song of the Year | "Dark Horse" (with Katy Perry) | Nominated |
