= Stick Talk =

Single by Future

from the album DS2
- Released: February 1, 2016
- Genre: Trap
- Length: 2:51
- Label: A1; Freebandz; Epic
- Songwriters: Nayvadius Wilburn; Joshua Luellen; Sasja Vanderveken
- Producer: Southside

Future singles chronology
"New Level" (2015)	"Stick Talk" (2016)	"Low Life" (2016)

"Stick Talk" is a song by the American rapper Future from his third studio album, DS2 (2015). It was sent to urban contemporary radio as the album's third single on February 1, 2016, through Epic Records. Written by Future alongside Sasja Vanderveken and producer Southside, it is a melancholic trap song with a rushed, melodic vocal delivery, where Future raps about his surroundings in what he described as the "lingo of the hood".

"Stick Talk" received positive reviews from music critics, who often praised the pairing of Southside's production with Future's vocals. A music video, directed by Eif Rivera, was released on October 29, 2015, featuring Future dancing as he explores the Little Haiti neighborhood of Miami, Florida, mainly in abandoned locations. American model Blac Chyna was present for the video's filming, leading to speculation that she was dating Future before he denied it. The song was subject to more media attention when American swimmer Michael Phelps revealed that he was listening to "Stick Talk" when making a viral face at the 2016 Summer Olympics.

== Background and recording ==
Prior to the release of "Stick Talk", American rapper Future and producer Southside had collaborated several times. He first began working with the rapper after producing the beat for Future and Rocko's 2013 song "Chosen One", which led to him contributing to Future's 2014 mixtape Monster alongside fellow producer Metro Boomin. Southside worked extensively on the mixtape 56 Nights (2015), with almost every beat being produced by him, although he was unaware of its existence until it was about to release.

Future recorded for "Stick Talk" while Southside was at a separate recording studio creating beats. He later called the producer to praise the beat as "timeless", promising that the song would "be a hit for the next 10 years." Southside, who later recalled that he was "really high off all kinds of shit," simply told him "[a]ll right," unsure of how Future could know it would be "timeless".

== Composition and lyrics ==
Musically, "Stick Talk" is a melancholic trap song with arpeggiated guitar, segmented into a four-count pattern with sporadically timed sirens. In the track-by-track commentary for DS2, Future explained that he wanted the song to be "feel good music for the streets" written in the "lingo of the hood", summarizing its themes as "rejoicing about ... being able to splurge ... and just have fun". Throughout the song, Future melodically raps with a "hoarse" voice in a rushed pace, noting immediately observations alongside his own beliefs, but asserts that the listener is "too soft" to understand his lyrics. Elsewhere, he "basks" in the infamy and luxury that earned him his wealth.

== Release and reception ==
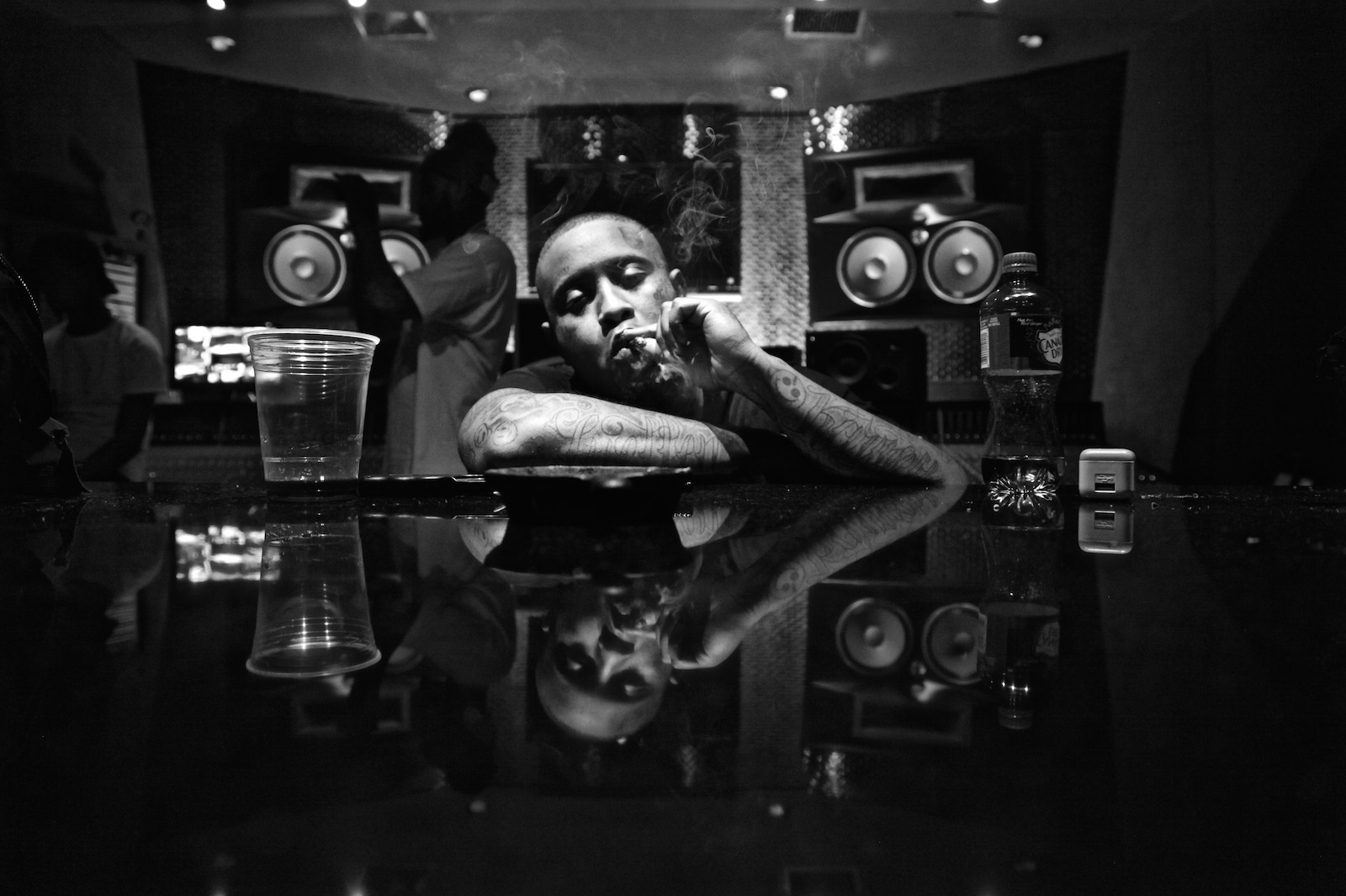
Critics often praised Southside's production on "Stick Talk".

"Stick Talk" was released as the sixth track from DS2 on July 17, 2015, following its track listing being revealed two days earlier. The song went on to chart on the Billboard Hot 100 and peaked at number 91, remaining on the chart for two weeks from January 9 to 16, 2016. It had previously charted on the Hot R&B/Hip-Hop Songs chart, peaking at number 38 and lasting for 20 weeks. After falling out of both charts, the track was sent to urban contemporary radio on February 1 through Epic Records as the album's third single, following "Fuck Up Some Commas" in March 2015 and "Where Ya At" in July. On July 16, 2026, the song was certified sextuple platinum by the Recording Industry Association of America (RIAA) for sales of over six million digital copies in the United States.

"Stick Talk" received positive reviews from music critics. Praising Southside's production, (Note: Southside's production is erroneously attributed to Metro Boomin in the article.) Complex's Jordan Rose said that it "helps give Future’s lyrics even more of a bounce than usual. Even if you can’t understand those bars because 'you’re too soft,' the song rings off all the same." In a retrospective review to celebrate Southside's 32nd birthday, Mitch Findlay of HotNewHipHop similarly noted how Future's vocals matched the beat, feeling that even the "more outrageous lyrics" resonated on it.

== Music video ==
The music video for "Stick Talk" began filming on October 1, 2015, with behind-the-scenes footage recorded that day being subject to media speculation after American model Blac Chyna was spotted on the video's set, sparking rumors that her and Future were dating. Many Internet users agreed with the sentiment, especially as TMZ and The Shade Room claimed that the two were seen at afterparties and clubs, and after Chyna got a tattoo with the word "Future" written in cursive, captioning it with the lyrics to Future's song "Thought It Was a Drought". Future later denied that he was dating her, stating that he was single. Two days after his statement, the video was uploaded to Future's YouTube channel on October 29.

Directed by Eif Rivera, the music video takes place in the Little Haiti neighborhood of Miami, Florida, referenced in Future wearing the Haitian flag like a cape while on a busy street. Elsewhere, he performs in spots devoid of people, including the porch of a dilapidated house and an abandoned parking garage. Future dances throughout, which was subject to memes by Internet users and compared to Drake's dancing in the music video for his single "Hotline Bling".

== In popular culture ==
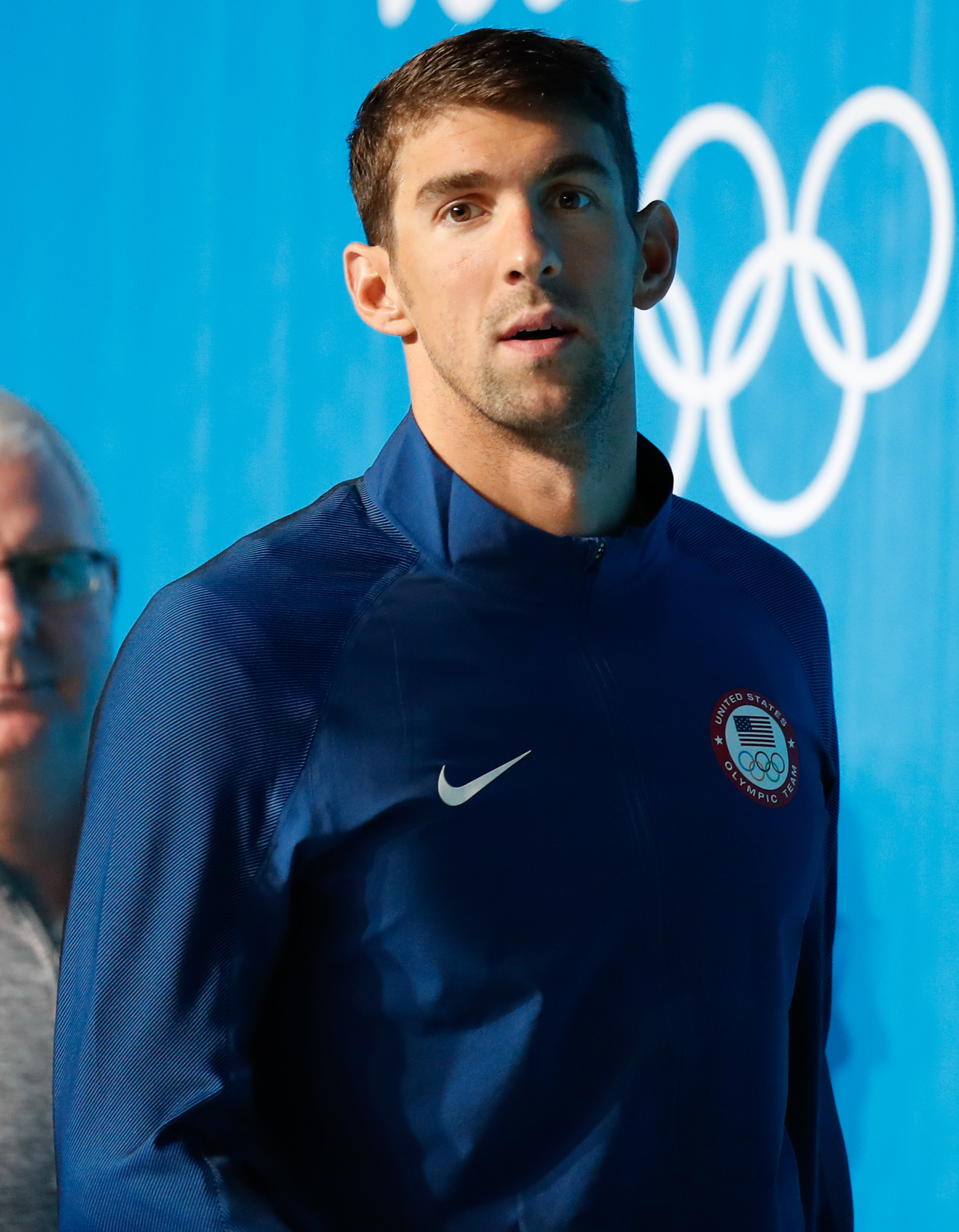
Swimmer Michael Phelps was listening to "Stick Talk" when he made the viral "#PhelpsFace" look.

During the 2016 Summer Olympics held in Rio de Janeiro, Brazil, American swimmer Michael Phelps unintentionally made an "intense" face at rival swimmer Chad le Clos while preparing for the semifinal. The face quickly went viral online, being subject to memes and the nickname "#PhelpsFace", with the swimmer later elaborating that, "I just had music going on in my head. I had thoughts going on in my head, spitting water a little bit all over the place, so I was in my own zone ... I was not intentionally mean mugging him or giving him a dirty look." That same month at the VMA Awards, he revealed that the "music" he was listening to was "Stick Talk", and praised Future for being optimistic and "inspiring" as he introduced him at the ceremony.

== Credits and personnel ==
Credits are adapted from Tidal and the BMI Repertoire. (Note: Find additional credits for the song on the BMI Repertoire by searching the work number #19993027.)

- Nayvadius WIlburn (Future) – songwriting, vocals
- Joshua Luellen (Southside) – songwriting, production
- Sasja Vanderveken – songwriting
- Jeremy D. Brown – additional studio producer, assistant engineer
- Niles Roberts – assistant engineer
- Tyler Kumpee – assistant engineer
- Seth Firkins – recording engineer, mixing engineer
- Eric Manco – mixing engineer
- Glenn Schick – mastering engineer
