= Future albums discography =

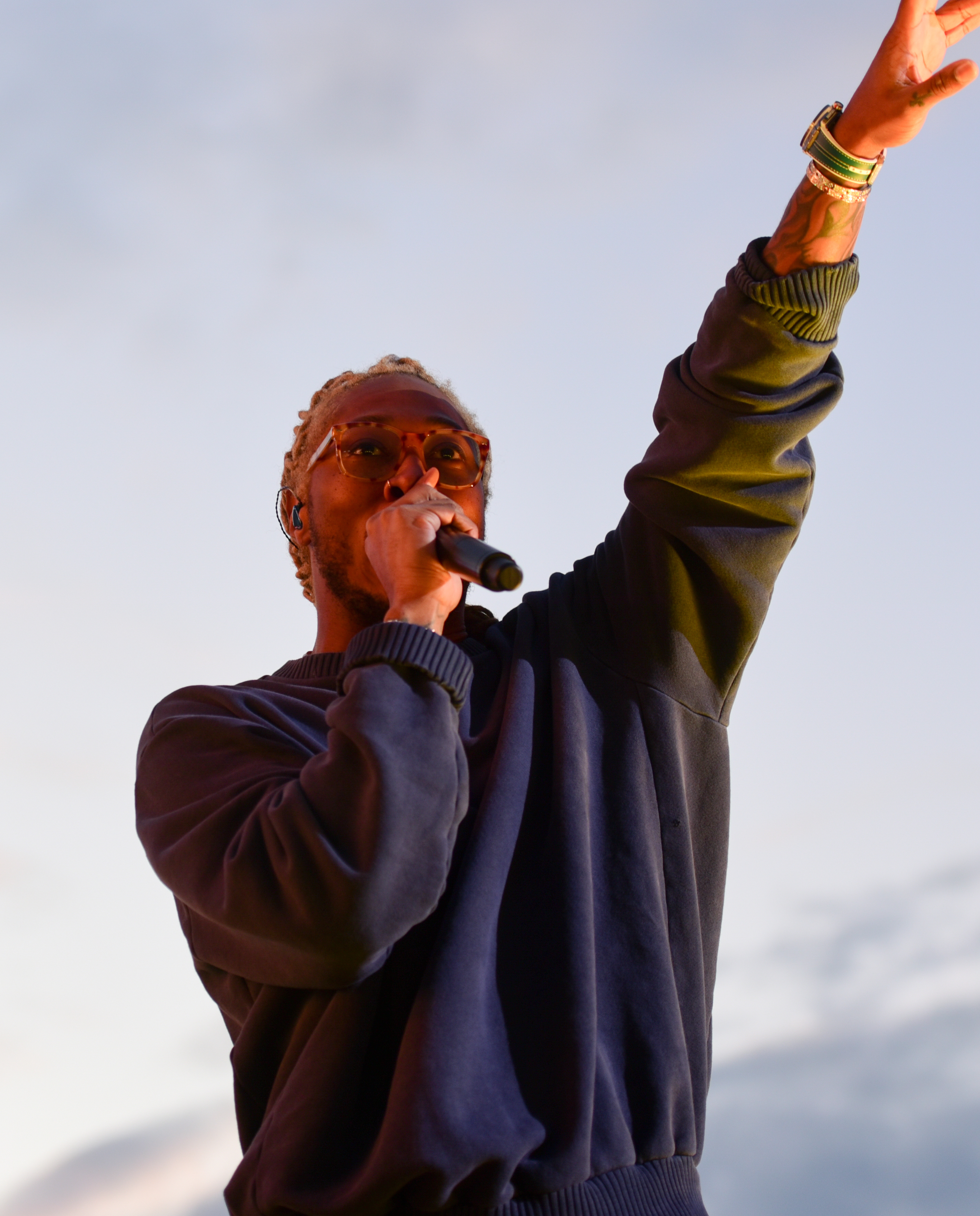
- Future in 2019
- Studio albums: 10
- EPs: 1
- Soundtrack albums: 1
- Collaborative albums: 3
- Reissued albums: 1
- Solo mixtapes: 9
- Collaborative mixtapes: 13

American rapper Future has released ten studio albums, three collaborative albums, one reissued album, one soundtrack album, nine solo mixtapes, 13 collaborative mixtapes, and one extended play (EP). His albums have sold more than 14.4 million album-equivalent units worldwide, with approximately 14 million of which are certified in the United States. Throughout his career, Future has achieved 11 number-one albums on the US Billboard 200, putting him at a tie with Eminem, Kanye West, Bruce Springsteen, and Barbra Streisand for the fourth most number-one albums in the charts history. He also achieved the record for the most chart-topping albums on the US Top Rap Albums chart (16).

Future began his recording career as a part of the Georgia-based hip-hop collective Dungeon Family, although he didn't release any major projects with the group. Future would later meet fellow Georgia-based rapper Rocko, and he would later sign to Rocko's label A1 Recordings. After signing to the label Future would go on to release a streak of independent mixtapes spanning from 2010 to 2012.

Future released his debut studio album, Pluto (2012), to success—the album peaked at number eight on the US Billboard 200. Future then released Pluto’s follow-up in 2014, titled Honest. The album peaked at number two on the US Billboard 200 and further pushed him out into the mainstream. Every following studio album released by Future: DS2 (2015), Evol (2016), Future and Hndrxx (both 2017), The Wizrd (2019), High Off Life (2020), and I Never Liked You (2022)—each debuted atop the US Billboard 200. With Future and Hndrxx in 2017, Future made history as Hndrxx replaced Future at number one on the US Billboard 200, marking it the first (and currently only) time that an artist had back-to-back number one albums. Pluto (2012), was re-released as a reissue later in 2012 as Pluto 3D, the reissue features three new songs and two official remixes.

Aside from his studio albums, Future has released three collaborative albums: Pluto x Baby Pluto (with Lil Uzi Vert in 2020), We Don't Trust You and We Still Don't Trust You (both with Metro Boomin in 2024)—with all three of the collaborative albums reaching the top-two of the US Billboard 200. Future has also released the soundtrack album Superfly (2018) for the accompanying film, various solo mixtapes—most notably Mixtape Pluto (2024), various collaborative mixtapes—most notably What a Time to Be Alive (with Drake in 2015) which reached number one on the US Billboard 200 (as well as Mixtape Pluto), and the extended plays: Free Bricks 2: Zone 6 Edition (with Gucci Mane in 2016), and Save Me (2019).

== Studio albums ==
List of studio albums, with selected chart positions, sales figures and certifications
Title	Album details	Peak chart positions										Certifications
Title	Album details	US	US R&B /HH	US Rap	AUS	CAN	FRA	IRE	NZ	SWE	UK	Certifications
Pluto	Released: April 17, 2012; Label: Epic, A1, Freebandz; Format: CD, LP, digital download	8	2	2	—	—	—	—	—	—	—	RIAA: Platinum
Honest	Released: April 22, 2014; Label: Epic, A1, Freebandz; Format: CD, LP, digital download	2	1	1	—	81	—	—	—	—	78	RIAA: Gold
DS2	Released: July 17, 2015; Label: Epic, A1, Freebandz; Format: CD, LP, digital download	1	1	1	—	5	161	—	—	—	56	RIAA: 3× Platinum; BPI: Silver
Evol	Released: February 6, 2016; Label: Epic, A1, Freebandz; Format: LP, digital download, cassette	1	1	1	31	5	95	—	—	—	34	RIAA: 2x Platinum; RMNZ: Gold
Future	Released: February 17, 2017; Label: Epic, A1, Freebandz; Formats: LP, digital download	1	1	1	42	1	43	—	33	29	15	RIAA: 2× Platinum; BPI: Silver; MC: Gold; RMNZ: Platinum
Hndrxx	Released: February 24, 2017; Label: Epic, A1, Freebandz; Formats: LP, digital download	1	1	1	53	1	45	—	39	24	21	RIAA: Platinum; BPI: Silver; MC: Gold; RMNZ: Platinum
The Wizrd	Released: January 18, 2019; Label: Epic, Freebandz; Formats: CD, LP, digital download, cassette	1	1	1	33	1	26	39	26	39	16	RIAA: Platinum
High Off Life	Released: May 15, 2020; Label: Epic, Freebandz; Formats: CD, LP, digital download	1	1	1	15	1	15	15	21	57	5	RIAA: 2× Platinum; MC: Gold; RMNZ: Gold
I Never Liked You	Released: April 29, 2022; Label: Epic, Freebandz; Format: CD, LP, digital download	1	1	1	1	1	19	6	1	23	2	RIAA: 2× Platinum; BPI: Silver; MC: Gold; RMNZ: Platinum
The Real Me	Released: July 10, 2026; Label: Epic, Freebandz; Format: CD,LP, Digital download, streaming	1	1	1	23	6	—	58	10	—	27	
Infinity	Released: TBA; Label: TBA; Format: TBA	TBA										
"—" denotes a recording that did not chart or was not released in that territory.

== Collaborative albums ==
List of studio albums, with selected chart positions, sales figures and certifications
Title	Album details	Peak chart positions										Sales	Certifications
Title	Album details	US	US R&B /HH	US Rap	AUS	CAN	FRA	IRE	NZ	SWE	UK	Sales	Certifications
Pluto x Baby Pluto (with Lil Uzi Vert)	Released: November 13, 2020; Label: Epic, Freebandz, Atlantic, Generation Now; Format: Streaming, digital download	2	1	1	—	5	57	28	29	49	39	US: 5,500	MC: 2× Platinum
We Don't Trust You (with Metro Boomin)	Released: March 22, 2024; Label: Wilburn Holding, Boominati, Epic, Republic; Format: Streaming, digital download, CD,LP	1	1	1	2	1	4	4	1	3	2	US: 22,209	BPI: Gold; MC: Platinum; RMNZ: Platinum
We Still Don't Trust You (with Metro Boomin)	Released: April 12, 2024; Label: Wilburn Holding, Boominati, Epic, Republic; Format: Streaming, digital download, CD,LP	1	1	1	15	2	12	15	6	33	11	US: 2,500	BPI: Silver

== Reissued albums ==
Title	Album details
Pluto 3D	Released: November 27, 2012; Label: Epic, A1, Freebandz; Format: CD, digital download

== Soundtrack albums ==
Title	Album details
Superfly	Released: June 8, 2018; Label: CTMG, Epic, Freebandz, A1; Format: CD, LP, digital download, Cassette

== Mixtapes ==
=== Self-released mixtapes ===
List of self-released mixtapes with selected details
Title	Album details
1000	Released: May 24, 2010; Hosted by DJ Scream; Label: Freebandz, A1 Recordings; Format: Digital download
Kno Mercy	Released: November 8, 2010; Hosted by DJ Bobby Black; Labels: Freebandz, A1 Recordings; Format: Digital download
Dirty Sprite	Released: January 11, 2011; Hosted By DJ Scream, DJ X-Rated & DJ Esco; Label: Freebandz, A1 Recordings; Format: Digital download
True Story	Released: June 9, 2011; Hosted by The Empire; Label: Freebandz, A1 Recordings; Format: Digital download
FDU & Freebandz (with Stuey Rock)	Released: June 17, 2011; Hosted by DJ Scream, DJ Spinz & DJ Pretty Boy Tank; Label: Freebandz, FDU Entertainment; Format: Digital download
Free Bricks (with Gucci Mane)	Released: July 29, 2011; Hosted by DJ Scream; Label: Freebandz, A1 Recordings, 1017 Records; Format: Digital download
Streetz Calling	Released: September 9, 2011; Label: Freebandz, A1 Recordings; Format: Digital download
FDU & Freebandz: Reloaded (with Stuey Rock)	Released: October 31, 2011; Label: Freebandz, A1 Recordings, FDU Entertainment; Format: Digital download
Astronaut Status	Released: January 12, 2012; Hosted by: DJ Scream, DJ X-Rated & DJ Esco; Label: Freebandz, A1 Recordings; Format: Digital download
F.B.G: The Movie (with Freeband Gang)	Released: January 15, 2013; Hosted by: DJ Drama; Label: Freebandz; Format: Digital download
Black Woodstock: The Soundtrack (with DJ Esco)	Released: April 20, 2013; Hosted by: DJ Esco & Future; Label: Freebandz; Format: Digital download
No Sleep (with DJ Esco)	Released: December 17, 2013; Hosted by: DJ Esco and Future; Labels: Freebandz; Format: Digital download
Monster	Released: October 28, 2014; Hosted by DJ Esco; Executive Produced by Metro Boomin; Label: Freebandz; Format: CD, digital download
Beast Mode (with Zaytoven)	Released: January 15, 2015; Label: Freebandz; Format: CD, digital download
56 Nights (with DJ Esco)	Released: March 21, 2015; Hosted by: Future and DJ Esco; Label: Freebandz; Format: CD, digital download
Purple Reign	Released: January 17, 2016; Hosted by: DJ Esco; Executive produced by: Metro Boomin; Label: Freebandz; Format: Digital download
Project E.T. (with DJ Esco)	Released: June 24, 2016; Hosted by: Future and DJ Esco; Executive produced by: DJ Esco; Label: Freebandz; Format: Digital download
Free Bricks 2: Zone 6 Edition (with Gucci Mane)	Released: November 14, 2016; Labels: Freebandz, 1017 Records; Format: Digital download

=== Commercial mixtapes ===
List of commercial mixtapes, with selected chart positions
Title	Album details	Peak chart positions										Sales
Title	Album details	US	US R&B /HH	US Rap	AUS	CAN	FRA	IRE	NZ	SWE	UK	Sales
Mixtape Pluto	Released: September 20, 2024; Label: Epic, Freebandz; Format: CD, LP, digital download	1	1	1	27	4	26	25	8	34	11	US: 129,000
"—" denotes a recording that did not chart or was not released in that territory.

== Collaborative mixtapes ==
List of collaborative mixtapes, with selected chart positions, sales figures and certifications
Title	Mixtape details	Peak chart positions										Sales	Certifications
Title	Mixtape details	US	US R&B /HH	US Rap	AUS	CAN	FRA	IRE	NZ	SWE	UK	Sales	Certifications
What a Time to Be Alive (with Drake)	Released: September 20, 2015; Labels: Epic, A1, Freebandz, Young Money, Cash Money, Republic, OVO; Formats: LP, streaming, digital download	1	1	1	4	1	34	30	8	36	6	US: 334,000	RIAA: Platinum; BPI: Gold; MC: 2× Platinum
Super Slimey (with Young Thug)	Released: October 20, 2017; Label: Epic, Freebandz, YSL, 300, Atlantic; Format: LP,Streaming, digital download	2	1	1	35	5	41	—	32	28	23	US: 75,000	
Beast Mode 2 (with Zaytoven)	Released: July 6, 2018; Label: Epic, Freebandz; Format: CD, streaming, digital download	3	3	3	—	13	—	—	—	—	55		
Wrld on Drugs (with Juice Wrld)	Released: October 19, 2018; Label: Epic, Freebandz, Interscope, Grade A; Format: Streaming, digital download	2	1	1	28	5	85	24	28	17	23	US: 8,000	RIAA: Platinum; BPI: Silver; MC: Gold
"—" denotes a recording that did not chart or was not released in that territory.

== Extended plays ==
Title	EP details	Peak chart positions							
Title	EP details	US	US R&B /HH	US Rap	BEL (FL)	CAN	FRA	LIT	UK
Save Me	Released: June 7, 2019; Labels: Epic, Freebandz; Formats: LP, Digital download, streaming	5	1	1	127	27	154	83	59
"—" denotes a recording that did not chart or was not released in that territory.
