= March Madness (song) =

2015 single by Future

Single by Future

from the album 56 Nights
- Released: August 31, 2015
- Recorded: 2013
- Genre: Trap
- Length: 4:04
- Label: A1; Freebandz; Epic
- Songwriters: Nayvadius Wilburn; Chance Youngblood
- Producer: Tarentino

Future singles chronology
"Where Ya At" (2015)	"March Madness" (2015)	"Jumpman" (2015)

"March Madness" is a song by the American rapper Future. It was released on August 31, 2015, as the lead single from his and DJ Esco's collaborative mixtape, (Note: Except for "Da Fam on da Gram", DJ Esco only contributed to the mixtape by creating its track listing, and is not credited alongside Future on streaming services or the "March Madness" single.) 56 Nights (2015), though it was made available online earlier. Written alongside producer Tarentino of 808 Mafia, the track started out as a beat that Tarentino made after dropping out of high school and being previously rejected by the rapper. Named after the basketball tournament of the same name, "March Madness" features raps about drug use and unfulfilling sexual encounters through Future's nihilistic outlook. A music video, released the same month, addresses police brutality through historical footage of protests.

"March Madness" received positive reviews from music critics, and both fan response and support from American basketball player LeBron James helped the track go viral online. A remix by American rapper Nas was debuted in late January 2016. It has since become one of Future's best known songs and is retrospectively acclaimed, with Billboard naming it one of the defining songs of the 2010s decade.

== Background and recording ==
Tarentino of 808 Mafia, the producer for "March Madness", began sending Future beats for songs at 16 years old after dropping out of high school. At first, Future disliked them, telling Tarentino that he did not want "trap beats" and that he should produce as if he was making them for a different artist, which inspired Tarentino to immediately start working on "March Madness" after getting off the phone with Future. The first thing he added was sounds from the Purity Virtual Studio Technology (VST) audio plug-in, which he liked for its "ambient" tones. For the 808 bass, he applied distortion to give it more "punch" if played in a club setting, and added hi-hats to complement them.

According to DJ Esco, Future recorded "March Madness" two years before its inclusion on their mixtape, 56 Nights (2015). It was the last song that Esco listened to before he was charged with marijuana possession and made to spend 56 days and nights at a local jail in Dubai, which he named the mixtape after. He had the melody to "March Madness" stuck in his head during his sentence, but was unable to remember the lyrics, as the distance between Dubai and the US made it hard for him to think of most things. Esco was released early after one of the guards took a liking to him and began advocating for his release, and he soon started compiling tracks to use on the mixtape.

== Composition and lyrics ==
"March Madness"
In "March Madness", Future raps without a central narrative and references parts of his life.

A trap song with changing keys, "March Madness" features prominent synthesizers that The Fader's Matthew Trammell compared to a horror film score. The track does not have a central theme, though each line forms an image of Future's personality and psyche when combined, similar to if they were parts of a pastiche. Future opens with the line "Dress it up and make it real for me", followed by him laughing and questioning his own statement with "[w]hatever the fuck that means". In the verses, he references being intoxicated on MDMA, the song's namesake basketball tournament, and driving fast in a foreign car, all through a nihilistic outlook. Future reflects that taking MDMA has caused him to have sex with women he would otherwise find "average", and dedicates a line to mourn the Black Americans killed by police brutality in 2015.

== Release ==
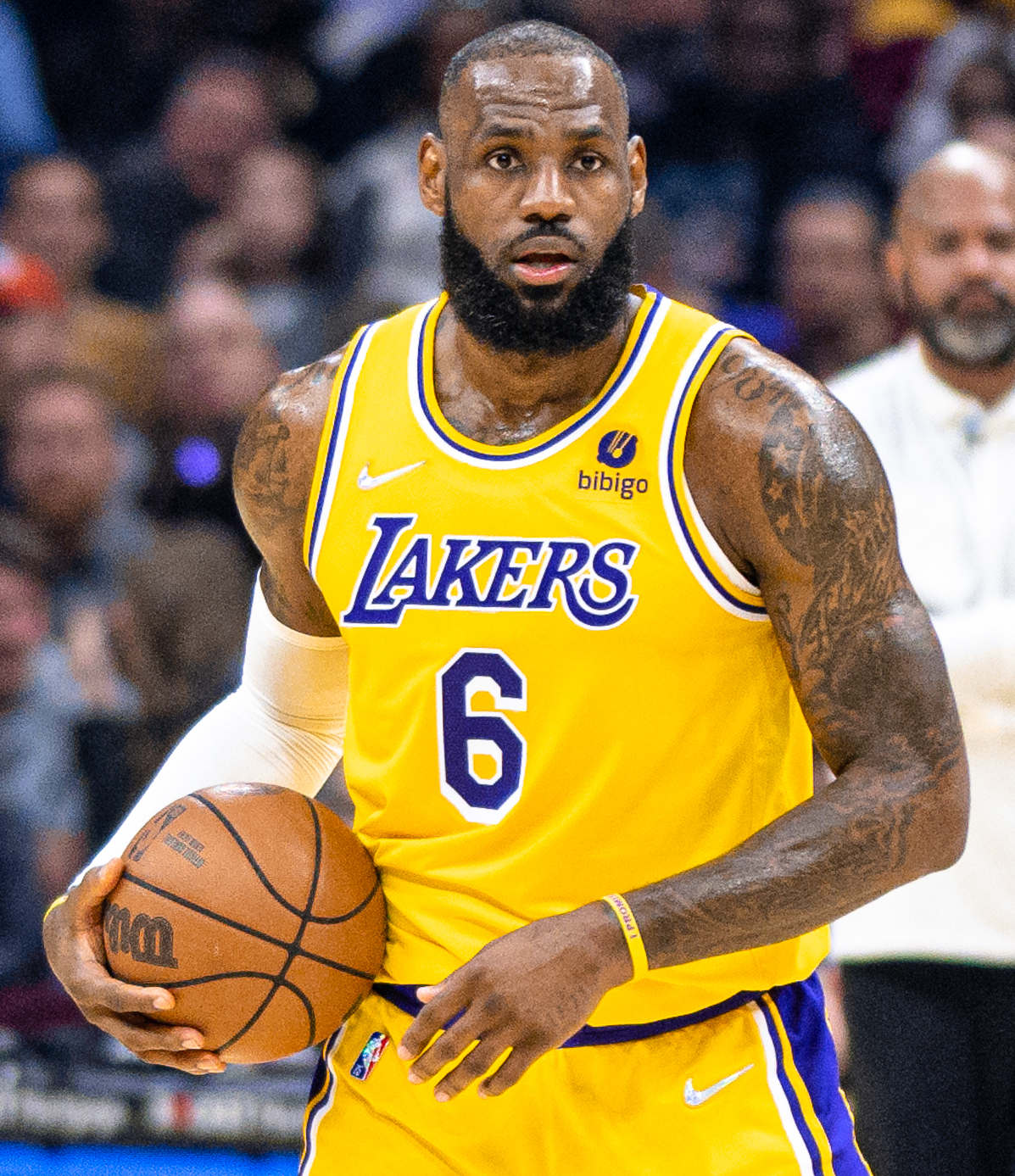
The success of "March Madness" was partly due to LeBron James, who was a public fan of the song.

"March Madness" was released online as a free download to SoundCloud on March 16, 2015, without any promotion beforehand. The release was part of Future's #MonsterMonday series of song releases, which previously included the tracks "Just Like Bruddas" and "Gangland". The song was not originally intended for 56 Nights, but according to Tarentino, its popularity convinced Future and Esco to include it on the majority Southside-produced mixtape. The project was released five days later on March 21, with "March Madness" as its final track. It was officially released as a single by A1, Freebandz, and Epic Records via digital download on iTunes on August 31, 2015. The single went on to make the Bubbling Under Hot 100 and Hot R&B/Hip-Hop Songs charts at numbers eight and 35, respectively.

The song's internet virality was in part due to American basketball player LeBron James, who played "March Madness" during pre-game warmups and named it his favorite song at the time. Future later reflected on James's support in a 2023 interview, stating that it and other people's words inspire him to create new music.

== Reception ==
=== Contemporary response ===
Music critics gave "March Madness" positive reviews. For HotNewHipHop, Patrick Lyons remarked that Future's music "stays great" amidst his then-increasing focus on nihilism and "empty relationships", though felt that it was "hard to hear him suffer" throughout the song. A list by the same publication named the beat one of the "15 hottest" of 2015, lauding how well Tarentino's production matched the lyrics, which writer Danny Schwartz considered exceptional. Meaghan Garvey of Pitchfork called "March Madness" the best track from 56 Nights, describing it as "the kind of bleary, disjointed monologue that happens when you finally catch up with yourself after avoiding yourself for days."

=== Retrospective response ===
"March Madness" has since become one of Future's best known songs, with Mosi Reeves of Rolling Stone Australia calling it a "touchstone" from the mixtape trio of Monster (2014), Beast Mode (2015), and 56 Nights. It was certified platinum by the Recording Industry Association of America (RIAA) on May 26, 2017, following a gold certification the previous May. By 2026, it was certified six times platinum. Lyons, writing for Billboard, argued that it was one of the 100 songs that defined the 2010s decade, while Reeves included it on Rolling Stone Australia's list of the greatest songs of the 21st century.

In an analysis of Future's music, Dallas Donnell of Southern Cultures viewed the track as part of the "aesthetic nihilism" seen in Future's "Codeine Crazy" and "Mask Off", framing it as a progression beyond the lingering grief seen in the former, but not as numb as the latter. He saw Future's references to the namesake basketball tournament as stripping away the athleticism and wealth associated with the word "Ballin'", instead "exposing the brutal juxtaposition of wealth and death" in Black Southern life and "establish[ing] a paradoxical no-man's-land between Black achievement and Black death, where [Future] is balling out of control, both haunted by and mired in enduring anti-Blackness."

== Nas remix ==
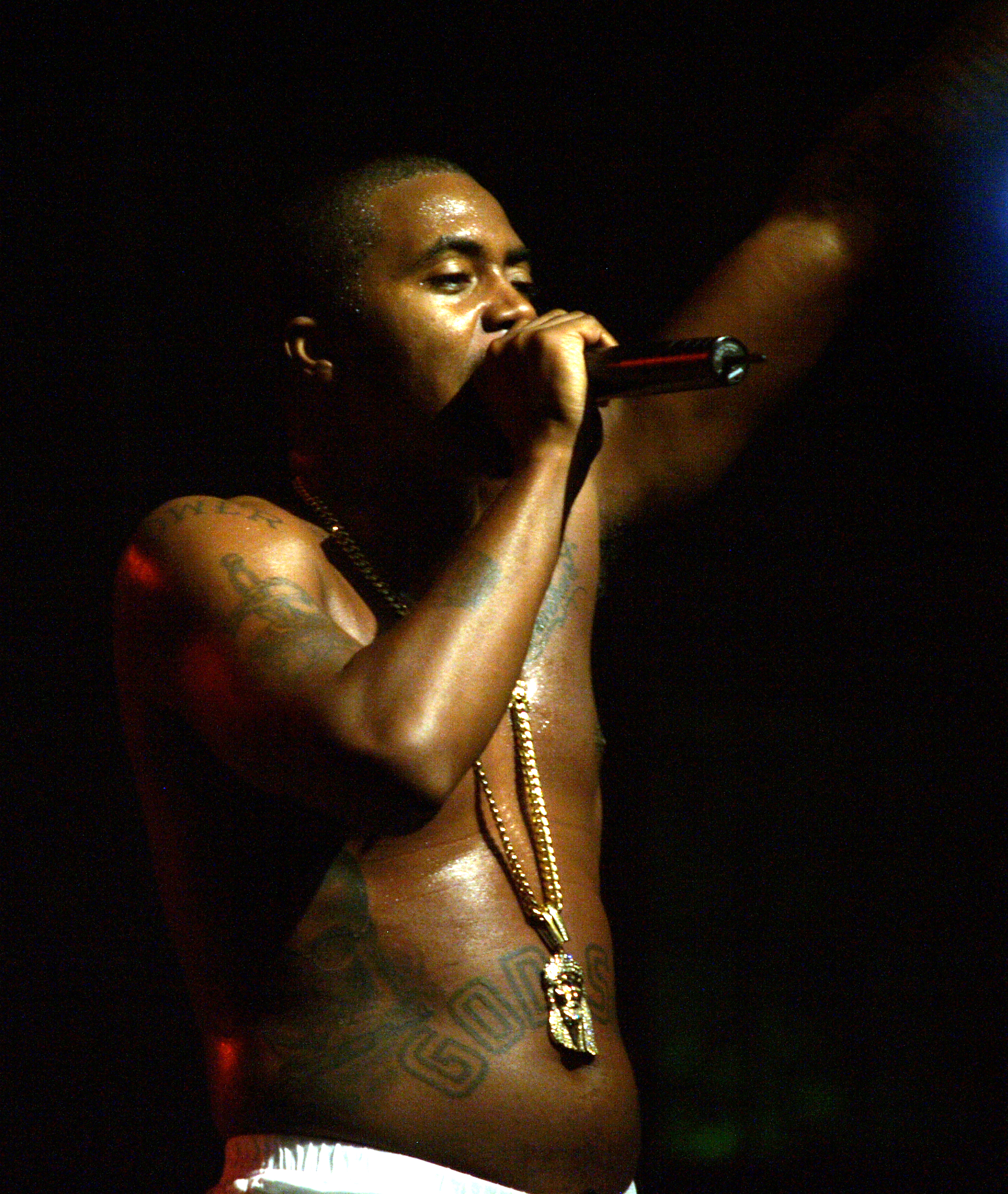
Nas premiered a remix of "March Madness" on OVO Sound Radio in January 2016.

On January 30, 2016, a remix of "March Madness" by American rapper Nas was premiered by Drake during his OVO Sound Radio show on Apple Music 1. A version with better audio quality was later found and shared by the publication 2DopeBoyz in early February. In his verse, Nas refers to himself as the father of hip-hop, pays homage to Future, and calls out television personality Maury Povich for perceived racism. Nas's verse was lauded by critics; HotNewHipHop's Angus Walker praised how it "unites two generations of hip-hop that are often seen in opposition to one another," while Jordan Darville of The Fader noted the "duality" between Nas's performance and the original song.

== Music video ==
The music video for "March Madness", directed by Vincent Lou Film, was released on March 31, 2015. The video was themed around recent discussions of police brutality against Black men in the United States, and features historical footage of it alongside protests and Nation of Islam prayers. Regarding the subject matter, Future later stated that he "sometimes [likes] to shed matters on certain things that are going on. I feel like my music can reach my people, and it can give them a new thought about what’s going on, a better outlook, a better understanding." When the footage is not present, Future is shown to be by himself, wearing a cowboy hat and dancing as the song plays. Critics generally praised the video for addressing police brutality, though Josiah Hughes of Exclaim! was more neutral, feeling that its themes and Future's outfits fit the song "well enough".

== Credits and personnel ==
Credits are adapted from Tidal.

- Nayvadius Wilburn (Future) – vocals, songwriter
- Chance Youngblood (Tarentino) – songwriter, production, drums
- Seth Firkins – mixing engineer
- Glenn Schick – mastering engineer

== Charts ==
Chart performance for "March Madness"
Chart (2015–2016)	Peak position
US Bubbling Under Hot 100 (Billboard)	8
US Hot R&B/Hip-Hop Songs (Billboard)	35

== Certifications ==
Certifications for "March Madness"
Region	Certification	Certified units/sales
Canada (Music Canada)	Platinum	80,000^{‡}
United States (RIAA)	6× Platinum	6,000,000^{‡}
^{‡} Sales+streaming figures based on certification alone.
