= What a Time to Be Alive =

2015 collaborative commercial mixtape by Drake and Future

Mixtape by Drake and Future
- Released: September 20, 2015
- Recorded: 2015
- Studio: Chalice, Los Angeles, California; Tree Sound, Atlanta, Georgia
- Genre: Hip hop; trap
- Length: 40:30
- Label: Young Money; Cash Money; Freebandz; A1; Republic; Epic
- Producer: Metro Boomin; 40; Allen Ritter; Boi-1da; Frank Dukes; Neenyo; Noel Cadastre; Southside

Drake chronology
If You're Reading This It's Too Late (2015)	What a Time to Be Alive (2015)	Views (2016)

Future chronology
DS2 (2015)	What a Time to Be Alive (2015)	Purple Reign (2016)

Singles from What a Time to Be Alive
- 1. "Jumpman" Released: November 10, 2015

What a Time to Be Alive is a collaborative commercial mixtape by Canadian rapper Drake and American rapper Future. It was released on September 20, 2015, by Young Money Entertainment, Cash Money Records, Republic Records, Epic Records, A1 Records and Freebandz. The mixtape was co-executive produced by Metro Boomin, who also produced or co-produced eight of its 11 songs, and 40, who co-produced the mixtape's final track. Additional producers include Southside, Allen Ritter, Boi-1da, Frank Dukes, and others. It was released on the iTunes Store and Apple Music, and debuted at number one on the US Billboard 200.

== Background ==
Shortly prior to What a Time to Be Alive, Drake and Future collaborated on the latter's single "Where Ya At". The duo talked about recording a mixtape together earlier that year, and following the recording sessions for "Where Ya At", they began working on the project in July.

According to a 2016 interview with Zane Lowe, Drake spent six days in Atlanta working on the project with Future. "Digital Dash" was the first song they made for the project, originally being a Future record that ended up being finished with Drake later. "Jumpman" was the last song the duo created for the project.

== Release, packaging and promotion ==
The mixtape was first teased by a range of sources including DJ Skee, Angela Yee and Ernest Baker, and this project was officially announced on Drake's Instagram on September 19, 2015, when he revealed the mixtape's release date and cover art.

The artwork is a stock image that was purchased from Shutterstock.

Drake and Future premiered the album on Beats 1 on OVO Sound's "OVO Sound Radio" show on September 20, 2015, and weeks after it was released on the iTunes Store and Apple Music.

The Summer Sixteen Tour by Drake was made to support this mixtape.

== Critical reception ==
Professional ratings
Aggregate scores
Source	Rating
AnyDecentMusic?	6.9/10
Metacritic	70/100
Review scores
Source	Rating
AllMusic	3.5/5 stars
Billboard	3/5 stars
Entertainment Weekly	C−
NME	4/5
The Observer	4/5 stars
Pitchfork	7.0/10
Q	3/5 stars
Rolling Stone	3.5/5 stars
Spin	7/10
XXL	4/5

What a Time to Be Alive received generally positive reviews from music critics. At Metacritic, which assigns a normalized rating out of 100 to reviews from mainstream publications, the album received an average score of 70, based on 24 reviews. Billboard described Drake and Future's chemistry as expected and said "Future deals with personal demons that he tries, and fails, to drown in drugs; Drake is mostly about insecurities and lesser gravity". Rolling Stone gave the album 3.5 out of 5 stars, attributing the "fresh and spontaneous" feel to the quick production of the album, where "both artists [are] playing off their louder-than-life personalities without overthinking the details". However, Sheldon Pearce in a Pitchfork review suggests that this limited time frame for making the album is the sonic downfall of the mixtape, arguing that the album "wasn't created with the care or the dutiful curation we've come to expect from both artists when solo."

Pearce's mixed review criticizes the "decided lack of chemistry between these two", because "they have difficulty sharing the same space" when on the same song. Pearce goes on to highlight how Future's presence, both in content and persona, is much more prevalent than Drake's, where the latter appears to be a "bystander" and "out of his element". Yet, he highlights moments where the collaboration works most effectively. On "Scholarships", Drake "throws Future the perfect alley-oop", "Jumpman" is a banger, and "Diamonds Dancing" is the first track between the two artists that "clicks on all cylinders". Additionally, Pearce lauds the production by Metro Boomin as "glimmering" and hails both rappers when they are able to work on their own and make music in their respective comfort zones in songs like Future's "Jersey" and Drake's "30 for 30 Freestyle".

Complex said about Drake verses: "despite a corny bar here or there, Drake sounds way more energized with much better flows." Entertainment Weekly was disappointed with Drake on the album, writing "despite a beat by Drake whisperer Noah '40' Shebib, the album-closing '30 For 30 Freestyle' doesn't come near clearing the admittedly high bar Drake has set for himself in 2015."

=== Rankings ===
Select rankings of What a Time to Be Alive
Publication	List	Rank	Ref.
Complex	The Best Albums of 2015	50	
Time Out Group	The 50 best albums of 2015	26	

== Commercial performance ==
What a Time to Be Alive debuted at number one on the US Billboard 200, with 375,000 album-equivalent units; it sold 334,000 copies in its first week, with the remainder of its unit count representing the album's streaming activity and track sales during the tracking week. It became both Drake and Future's second albums to chart at number one on the Billboard 200 in 2015 (If You're Reading This It's Too Late and DS2, respectively). In its second week it sold 65,000 copies. As of January 27, 2016, What a Time to Be Alive has sold 519,000 copies in the United States. On December 8, 2022, the album was certified 2x Multi-Platinum by the Recording Industry Association of America (RIAA), for combined sales and album-equivalent units of over two million units.

== Track listing ==
What a Time to Be Alive track listing
No.	Title	Writer(s)	Producer(s)	Length
1.	"Digital Dash"	Aubrey Graham; Nayvadius Wilburn; Leland Wayne; Joshua Luellen	Metro Boomin; Southside	3:51
2.	"Big Rings"	Graham; Wilburn; Wayne	Metro Boomin	3:37
3.	"Live from the Gutter"	Graham; Wilburn; Luellen; Wayne; Matthew Samuels	Metro Boomin; Southside; Boi-1da	3:31
4.	"Diamonds Dancing"	Graham; Wilburn; Wayne; Allen Ritter; Adam Feeney	Metro Boomin; Ritter; Frank Dukes	5:14
5.	"Scholarships"	Graham; Wilburn; Wayne	Metro Boomin	3:29
6.	"Plastic Bag"	Graham; Wilburn; Sean Seaton	Neenyo	3:22
7.	"I'm the Plug"	Graham; Wilburn; Wayne; Luellen	Metro Boomin; Southside	3:00
8.	"Change Locations"	Graham; Wilburn; Noel Cadastre	Cadastre	3:40
9.	"Jumpman"	Wilburn; Wayne; Graham	Metro Boomin	3:25
10.	"Jersey" (performed by Future)	Wilburn; Wayne; Luellen	Metro Boomin; Southside	3:08
11.	"30 for 30 Freestyle" (performed by Drake)	Graham; Noah Shebib	40	4:13
Total length:				40:30

Notes

- "30 for 30 Freestyle" features background vocals by Kyle Machado

== Personnel ==
Musicians

- Maneesh – piano, keyboards (tracks 3, 6)

Technical

- Eric Manco – recording (tracks 1–5, 7–9)
- Seth Firkins – recording (track 6)
- James Kang – recording (track 10)
- Miguel Scott – recording assistance (tracks 1–9, 11)
- Noel "Gadget" Campbell – mixing (tracks 1–9, 11)
- Noah "40" Shebib – mixing (tracks 1–9, 11)
- Metro Boomin – mixing (track 10)
- Les Bateman – mixing assistance (tracks 1–9, 11)
- Greg Moffett – mixing assistance (tracks 1–9, 11)
- Harley Arsenault – mixing assistance (tracks 1–9, 11)
- Noel Cadastre – engineering (tracks 1–9, 11)
- Chris Athens – mastering (all tracks)
- Dave Huffman – mastering assistance (all tracks)

== Charts ==
=== Weekly charts ===
Weekly chart performance for What a Time to Be Alive
Chart (2015–2016)	Peak position
Australian Albums (ARIA)	4
Belgian Albums (Ultratop Flanders)	23
Belgian Albums (Ultratop Wallonia)	46
Canadian Albums (Billboard)	1
Danish Albums (Hitlisten)	21
Dutch Albums (Album Top 100)	9
French Albums (SNEP)	34
Irish Albums (IRMA)	30
New Zealand Albums (RMNZ)	8
Norwegian Albums (VG-lista)	26
Scottish Albums (OCC)	16
Spanish Albums (Promusicae)	99
Swedish Albums (Sverigetopplistan)	36
UK Albums (OCC)	6
UK R&B Albums (OCC)	1
US Billboard 200	1
US Top R&B/Hip-Hop Albums (Billboard)	1

=== Year-end charts ===
Year-end chart performance for What a Time to Be Alive
Chart (2015)	Position
Canadian Albums (Billboard)	38
US Billboard 200	26
US Digital Albums (Billboard)	6
US Top R&B/Hip-Hop Albums (Billboard)	7
US Top Rap Albums (Billboard)	6

2016 year-end chart performance for What A Time To Be Alive
Chart (2016)	Position
US Billboard 200	25
US Top R&B/Hip-Hop Albums (Billboard)	33

2017 year-end chart performance for What A Time To Be Alive
Chart (2017)	Position
US Billboard 200	174

=== Decade-end charts ===
Decade-end chart performance for What a Time to Be Alive
Chart (2010–2019)	Position
US Billboard 200	155

== Certifications ==
Certifications for What a Time to Be Alive
Region	Certification	Certified units/sales
Canada (Music Canada)	2× Platinum	160,000^{‡}
Denmark (IFPI Danmark)	Gold	10,000^{‡}
New Zealand (RMNZ)	Gold	7,500^{‡}
United Kingdom (BPI)	Gold	100,000^{‡}
United States (RIAA)	2× Platinum	2,000,000^{‡}
^{‡} Sales+streaming figures based on certification alone.

== See also ==
- List of number-one albums of 2015 (Canada)
- List of UK R&B Chart number-one albums of 2015
- List of Billboard 200 number-one albums of 2015
- List of Billboard number-one R&B/Hip-Hop albums of 2015
