= 3Bubble and J. Gray =

American Hip Hop music group

3Bubble & J. Gray
- Also known as: 3 & J
- Origin: Houston, Texas, United States
- Genres: Hip hop, Southern hip hop, luxury rap
- Years active: 2014–present
- Label: LFTP Entertainment
- Members: Cleon "3Bubble" Solomon; Justin "J. Gray" Gray
- Website: 3bubbleandjgray.com

3Bubble & J. Gray is a US hip hop duo from Houston, Texas.

== History ==
3Bubble is a rapper from Houston, Texas, where he graduated from Worthing High School in 2000. He came up with the stage name 3Bubble from a moniker for the 3rd Degree in which he wrote out the number three and with a numerical degree sign. He turned this unique marker into the word "bubble" to ensure it was hard to forget.

J. Gray is a rapper who attended the High School for the Performing and Visual Arts for two years to study music but ultimately graduated from Westside High School. Gray realized that he was not only a talented singer but also a good freestyle rapper during battles against his peers.

As 3Bubble & J. Gray, the two have released a total of three studio albums and have collaborated on other artist tracks such as Patrick Adams's track Invisible and the Major Deal Original Soundtrack.

In 2016, 3Bubble & J. Gray released their album, Live From the Pentagon.

== Career ==
In May 2016, the duo released their debut album Live From The Pentagon, which was chosen as one of the best albums of 2016 by Paste.

Their sophomore album, Pentagon Memoirs, was released in September 2016 out of frustration from not receiving support from their hometown fans and is a blend of Hip hop and soul.

LFTP Season Vol.1 is their latest creation and is meant to be a collection of studio tracks and collaborative freestyle sessions that mesh a combination of styles from trap to soul and hip hop. The album consists of nine tracks with features by R.A.G.S and label mates J. Sariah, Robert Hodge and King Kelechi.

== Musical style and influences ==
3Bubble & J. Gray are influenced by soul and passion from different genres, including Scarface, Lil Keke, Jay-Z, Bilal, Jamie Foxx, Slick Rick, 8Ball & MJG and OutKast. The Huffington Post described the duo as "The New Outkast" and described their sound as "more as a reboot than a replay of 90’s rap." The duo's debut album Live From The Pentagon incorporates Funk, Pop, Soul and EDM into a classic Hip Hop sound. The duo cites some of the most influential albums or songs that made an impact on them as John Mayer's album Room for Squares, Outkast's single Liberation, Scarface's single Someday, Bilal's single Sometimes, and Future's single March Madness.

== Discography ==
=== Albums ===
- 2016 - Live From The Pentagon
- 2016 - Pentagon Memoirs
- 2018 - LFTP Season Vol.1
