= Riot (2 Chainz song) =

Song by 2 Chainz

from the album T.R.U. REALigion
- Released: February 2012
- Genre: Hip-hop
- Length: 2:43 (mixtape version); 2:47 (album version)
- Label: Def Jam
- Songwriters: Tauheed Epps; Gary Hill
- Producer: DJ Spinz

"Riot" is a song by American hip-hop recording artist 2 Chainz. It first appeared on November 1, 2011, included in his mixtape T.R.U. REALigion, then it began charting in February 2012 on the Hot R&B/Hip-Hop Songs listing, peaking at number 54 in May. A music video released in April helped to sustain the chart run.

The song was included on the deluxe edition of 2 Chainz's first full-length album Based on a T.R.U. Story in August 2012.

== Music video ==
On April 10, 2012, the music video was officially released. It was shot at night in Atlanta and directed by Decatur Dan. The video portrays Chainz as the leader of a group of unruly rebels destroying cars and starting fires.

== Charts ==
Chart (2012)	Peak position
US Bubbling Under Hot 100 (Billboard)	18
US Hot R&B/Hip-Hop Songs (Billboard)	54

== Certifications ==
Region	Certification	Certified units/sales
United States (RIAA)	Gold	500,000^{‡}
^{‡} Sales+streaming figures based on certification alone.
