= Monster (mixtape) =

Mixtape by Future
- Released: October 28, 2014
- Recorded: 2014
- Genres: Hip-hop; trap
- Length: 52:29
- Label: Freebandz
- Producers: Metro Boomin (also exec.); 30 Roc; Bobby Kritical; DJ Spinz; DJ Plugg; Nard & B; Southside; TM88; Will-A-Fool
- Compiler: DJ Esco

Future chronology
Honest (2014)	Monster (2014)	Beast Mode (2015)

Singles from Monster
- 1. "Monster" Released: August 18, 2014; 2. "Fuck Up Some Commas" Released: March 2, 2015

Monster is the thirteenth mixtape by American rapper Future. It was released on October 28, 2014, by Freebandz Entertainment. Along with Beast Mode and 56 Nights, it is considered one of "a trilogy of album-quality mixtapes" that Future released following Honest. The mixtape was executive produced by Metro Boomin.

On October 28, 2019, Monster was released onto streaming platforms in celebration of five years since release, excluding the tracks "Intro", "Abu's Boomin" and "Fuck Up Some Commas"; the latter of which is available on streaming services through Future's 2015 album DS2.

== Critical reception ==
Professional ratings
Review scores
Source	Rating
AllMusic	4/5 stars
PopMatters	6/10
Slant Magazine	3.5/5 stars
Vice (Expert Witness)	B+
Pitchfork	9.5/10

Monster was acclaimed by critics and fans alike. It is widely considered to be one of Future's best works. In Vice, Robert Christgau gave Monster a "B+" and described it as "strong like pop so seldom is. Vulnerable like pop so seldom is too." Sam C. Mac from Slant Magazine gave Monster three-and-a-half out of five stars, while PopMatters critic Colin McGuire gave it six out of ten stars. Future explores a darker sound on this mixtape due to the help of producer Metro Boomin. According to XXL, Future shines on this mixtape even without the help of other rappers since the record only includes one guest verse from Lil Wayne.

== Track listing ==
Credits adapted from Tidal.

No.	Title	Writer(s)	Producer(s)	Length
1.	"The Intro (Monster)"			1:00
2.	"Radical"	Nayvadius Wilburn; Leland Wayne	Metro Boomin	3:29
3.	"Monster"	Wilburn; Wayne; Joshua Luellen	Metro Boomin; Southside	3:39
4.	"Abu's Boomin" (skit)			1:33
5.	"Fuck Up Some Commas"	Wilburn; Luellen; Gary Hill	Southside; DJ Spinz	3:36
6.	"Throw Away"	Wilburn; James Rosser, Jr.; Brandon Rackley	Nard & B	5:18
7.	"After That" (featuring Lil Wayne)	Wilburn; Dwayne Carter, Jr.; Luellen; Bryan Simmons	Southside; TM88	2:53
8.	"My Savages"	Wilburn; Willie Byrd	Will-A-Fool	3:24
9.	"2Pac"	Wilburn; Rosser, Jr.; Rackley	Nard & B	3:21
10.	"Gangland"	Wilburn; Kenneth Smith; Bobby Turner; Samuel Gloade	DJ Plugg; Bobby Kritical; 30 Roc	3:01
11.	"Fetti"	Wilburn; Wayne; Luellen; Simmons	Metro Boomin; Southside; TM88	3:43
12.	"Hardly"	Wilburn; Luellen	Southside	2:37
13.	"Wesley Presley"	Wilburn; Wayne	Metro Boomin	2:26
14.	"Showed Up"	Wilburn; Hill; Simmons	DJ Spinz; TM88	3:22
15.	"Mad Luv"	Wilburn; Wayne; Smith	Metro Boomin; DJ Plugg	3:15
16.	"Codeine Crazy"	Wilburn; Simmons	TM88	5:52
Total length:				52:29

Streaming / LP Reissue
No.	Title	Length
1.	"Radical"	3:29
2.	"Monster"	3:39
3.	"Throw Away"	5:18
4.	"After That" (featuring Lil Wayne)	2:53
5.	"My Savages"	3:24
6.	"2Pac"	3:21
7.	"Gangland"	3:01
8.	"Fetti"	3:43
9.	"Hardly"	2:37
10.	"Wesley Presley"	2:26
11.	"Showed Up"	3:22
12.	"Mad Luv"	3:15
13.	"Codeine Crazy"	5:52
Total length:		46:20

=== Notes ===
- ''Fuck Up Some Commas'' was included as the closer on the deluxe edition of DS2, Future's next studio album. To avoid having the song on multiple projects, it was removed from the tracklist of the reissue.

== Personnel ==
Credits adapted from Tidal.

- Seth Firkins – mixing (all tracks)
- Glenn Schick – mastering (all tracks)

== Charts ==
Chart (2019)	Peak position
US Billboard 200	120
