= T.R.U. REALigion =

Mixtape by 2 Chainz
- Released: November 1, 2011
- Genres: Hip hop; southern hip hop
- Length: 63:15
- Labels: The Real University, Two Gun Gang, Street Executives, Aphilliates Music Group
- Producers: 2 Chainz; Cash Hits; ChopHouze; DJ Spinz; Drumma Boy; FATBOI; G Fresh; Honorable C.N.O.T.E.; Josh Holiday; KB; Lex Luger; M16; Marz; Mayowa; Mike WiLL Made It; Southside

2 Chainz chronology
Trap-A-Velli 2: (The Residue) (2010)	T.R.U. REALigion (2011)	Based on a T.R.U. Story (2012)

T.R.U. REALigion is the seventh mixtape by American rapper 2 Chainz. It was released on November 1, 2011. The song "Riot" peaked at number 15 on the Bubbling Under Hot 100 and number 54 on the Hot R&B/Hip-Hop Songs charts and was later included on his debut album Based on a T.R.U. Story (2012).

The project has amassed over 1 million downloads on mixtape sharing site DatPiff, making it certified Diamond as per the website's standards. This tape features guest appearances from Cap.1, Meek Mill, T.I., Kreayshawn, Young Jeezy, Yo Gotti, Birdman, J-Hard, Big Sean, Jadakiss, Dolla Boy, Raekwon, and Trey Songz.

On November 8, 2021, was released the 10th Anniversary Edition of T.R.U Realigion on the streaming services, with two new songs including "Wreck" featuring Big Sean and "Sofa" featuring Wiz Khalifa. He has also announced a one-week tour with DJ Drama.

== Reception ==
=== Critical response ===
Professional ratings
Review scores
Source	Rating
XXL	(XL)

T.R.U. REALigion was met with generally favorable reviews from music critics. Martin Spasov of XXL gave the album an XL, proclaiming "Even though T.R.U. Realigion, isn’t a groundbreaking or particularly wholly creative mixtape (some of the long-haired rapper’s rhymes are actually simple but quite funny), when the subject is stuntin’ or ballin’ (or griming), 2 Chainz excels, and creates satisfying trunk-rattling music. That is when both the tape and the rapper are at their best: when the only goal is to get you to zone out and nod your head to the almost primal drums. That’s when the music, like 2 Chainz’ rise to fame, is volcanic."

== Track listing ==
No.	Title	Writer(s)	Producer(s)	Length
1.	"Intro"	Tauheed Epps	2 Chainz	0:40
2.	"Got One"	Marquell Middlebrooks; Epps; Michael Williams II	Mike WiLL Made It; Marz	3:08
3.	"Undastatement"	Epps	Lex Luger; Southside	3:33
4.	"Turn Up" (featuring Cap.1)	King Richie; Epps	Drumma Boy	3:59
5.	"Riot"	Epps; Gary Hill	DJ Spinz	2:43
6.	"Stunt" (featuring Meek Mill)	Robert Williams; Epps	G Fresh	3:26
7.	"Vi-Agra"	Epps	FATBOI	3:58
8.	"Spend It (Remix)" (featuring T.I.)	Epps; Clifford Harris Jr.	Drumma Boy	3:44
9.	"I'm Tity Boi"	Epps	2 Chainz	0:29
10.	"Murder" (featuring Kreayshawn)	Natassia Zolot; Epps	Honorable C.N.O.T.E.	3:13
11.	"Slangin Birds" (featuring Young Jeezy, Yo Gotti & Birdman)	Epps; Bryan Williams; Mario Mims; Jay Jenkins	Drumma Boy	4:41
12.	"Addicted to Rubberbands" (featuring J-Hard)	Epps; J Hard	Drumma Boy	3:36
13.	"Money Makin Mission"	Epps	Lex Luger	3:05
14.	"K.O." (featuring Big Sean)	Epps; Sean Anderson	KB; Josh Holiday	3:47
15.	"One Day at a Time" (featuring Jadakiss)	Epps; Jason Phillips	Cash Hits	4:28
16.	"The Real University"	Epps	2 Chainz	0:55
17.	"Letter to da Rap Game" (featuring Dolla Boy & Raekwon)	Earl Conyers; Corey Woods; Epps	M16	4:59
18.	"I Got It" (featuring Trey Songz)	Tremaine Neverson; Epps	Mayowa	3:47
19.	"Kesha"	Epps	ChopHouze	3:31
Total length:				57:02

T.R.U. REALigion (Anniversary Edition)
No.	Title	Writer(s)	Producer(s)	Length
1.	"Got One"		Mike WiLL Made It; Marz	2:53
2.	"Undastatement"		Lex Luger; Southside	3:26
3.	"Turn Up" (featuring Cap1)		Drumma Boy	4:07
4.	"Wreck" (featuring Big Sean)	Epps; Anderson	Hitmaka; Aye YB	2:03
5.	"Sofa" (featuring Wiz Khalifa)	Tyron Douglas Sr; Epps; Cameron Thomaz	Buddah Bless	2:59
6.	"Stunt" (featuring Meek Mill)		G Fresh	3:09
7.	"Vi-Agra"		FATBOI	4:03
8.	"Spend It" (featuring T.I.)		Drumma Boy	3:45
9.	"Murder" (featuring Kreayshawn)		Honorable C.N.O.T.E.	3:14
10.	"Slangin Birds" (featuring Young Jeezy, Yo Gotti & Birdman)		Drumma Boy	4:52
11.	"Addicted to Rubberbands" (featuring J Hard)		Drumma Boy	3:43
12.	"Money Makin Mission"		Lex Luger	3:14
13.	"K.O." (featuring Big Sean)		KB; Josh Holiday	4:18
14.	"One Day at a Time" (featuring Jadakiss)		Cash Hits	4:26
15.	"Letter to da Rap Game" (featuring Dolla Boy & Raekwon)		M16	5:06
16.	"I Got It" (featuring Trey Songz)		Mayowa	3:49
17.	"Kesha"		ChopHouze	3:31
Total length:				60:03
