= Seth Firkins =

- Birth name: Seth Chaim Firkins
- Born: August 5, 1981; Louisville, Kentucky, U.S.
- Died: September 23, 2017 (aged 36); Atlanta, Georgia, U.S.
- Genres: Hip hop; trap; R&B; pop; rock and roll
- Occupations: Audio engineer; recording engineer; mixing engineer; record producer; songwriter
- Years active: 2000–2017
- Labels: Five by Five Media Group (5X5)
- Website: fivebyfivemediagroup.com

Seth Chaim Firkins (August 5, 1981 – September 23, 2017) was an American audio engineer. Firkins engineered songs for artists such as Rihanna, Future, Young Thug, Jay-Z, Trina, Ciara, and Gucci Mane.

== Career ==
Firkins was exposed at an early age to a diverse range of music, from 1970s rock like America and Steely Dan, to classical composers such as Chopin and Beethoven. He started his career in the Rock and roll genre with the Louisville-based band Heaven Hill, originally known as Element H and later Breckinridge. Firkins created the band's street team which grew into a group of nearly 400 workers and volunteers. In 2002, Firkins worked on his first rap album with artist Hurra Season, a Louisville-based artist.

In 2006, he relocated to Atlanta, which became his permanent place of residence, and headquarters for 5X5 Media Group, a consulting music firm. 5X5 Media Group consults with artists to offer post-production services.

Firkins is credited with over 2.5 million records sold worldwide and was part of the Grammy nominated team which produced the Jay-Z album American Gangster which is certified platinum in the United States by the RIAA. Firkins was credited with engineering and mixing the Rihanna track "Loveeeeeee Song", featuring Atlanta rap artist Future, on the album Unapologetic. The album was released on November 19, 2012.

Firkins continued his work with Future, and is credited with engineering and mixing for Future's second studio album, Pluto 3D, released on November 27, 2012. He is also credited with the 2 albums Future released back to back in 2017: Future and HNDRXX.

== Death ==
Firkins died in his sleep on September 23, 2017, in Atlanta, Georgia, at the age of 36.

== Engineering discography ==
- American Gangster – Jay-Z
- Appeal: Georgia's Most Wanted – Gucci Mane
- Still da Baddest – Trina
- Problem – Bukshot
- All Honesty – SL Jones
- Unapologetic – Rihanna
- Pluto 3D – Future
- Ciara – Ciara
- Future – Future
- Hndrxx – Future
- Beast Mode 2 – Future
- DS2 - Future
- Purple Reign - Future
- Beast Mode - Future
- 56 Nights - Future
- Monster - Future
- Evol - Future
- E.T. - Future
