= Where Ya At =

Single by Future featuring Drake

from the album DS2
- Released: July 16, 2015
- Genre: Trap
- Length: 3:27
- Label: A1; Freebandz; Epic
- Songwriters: Nayvadius Wilburn; Aubrey Graham; Leland Wayne
- Producer: Metro Boomin

Future singles chronology
"Blasé" (2015)	"Where Ya At" (2015)	"March Madness" (2015)

Drake singles chronology
"My Way" (2015)	"Where Ya At" (2015)	"Charged Up" (2015)

Music video
- "Where Ya At" on YouTube

"Where Ya At" is a song by American rapper Future featuring Canadian rapper Drake. Written by the artists alongside producer Metro Boomin, it was released on July 16, 2015, as the second single from Future's third studio album, DS2 (2015). Musically, it is a trap song where both rappers question the loyalty of their friends and recount their career beginnings.

Music critics generally praised "Where Ya At" for the chemistry between both rappers, extending to their performances. A music video, directed by Rick Nyce, was released in August, featuring Future rapping on a rooftop while Drake looks out of a skyscraper and walks through a warehouse; the two later meet at a roundtable dinner to have a toast. Commercially, the song peaked at number 28 on the US Billboard Hot 100, becoming Future's first top 30 single as a lead artist, and also charted in Canada and France. It has since been certified sextuple platinum by the Recording Industry Association of America (RIAA).

== Background ==
Before the release of "Where Ya At", American rapper Future and Canadian rapper Drake had previously collaborated several times, including the single "Love Me" by Lil Wayne and the track "Never Satisfied" from Future's second studio album, Honest (2014) The latter received fan backlash regarding its short length, causing producer Mike Will Made It to upload a longer version to his SoundCloud account. The two maintained a positive working relationship, with an interaction between them going on to inspire Drake's 2013 single "Started from the Bottom", though Future being misquoted in a Billboard interview regarding his thoughts on Drake's album Nothing Was the Same (2013) nearly caused him to be dropped from its supporting tour, with Future seeking damages of US$1.5 million in lost revenue before they reconciled.

== Composition and lyrics ==
A trap song featuring keyboards and minor chords, "Where Ya At" sees both rappers questioning the loyalty of their friends, asking them where they were before their fame. Each line begins with the phrase "where ya ass was at", similar to a chant. Drake's verse alludes to his career beginnings, such as mentioning that he used to record in a bathroom, and that he is now taking "attendance" to check if his associates were with him at the time.

== Release and reception ==
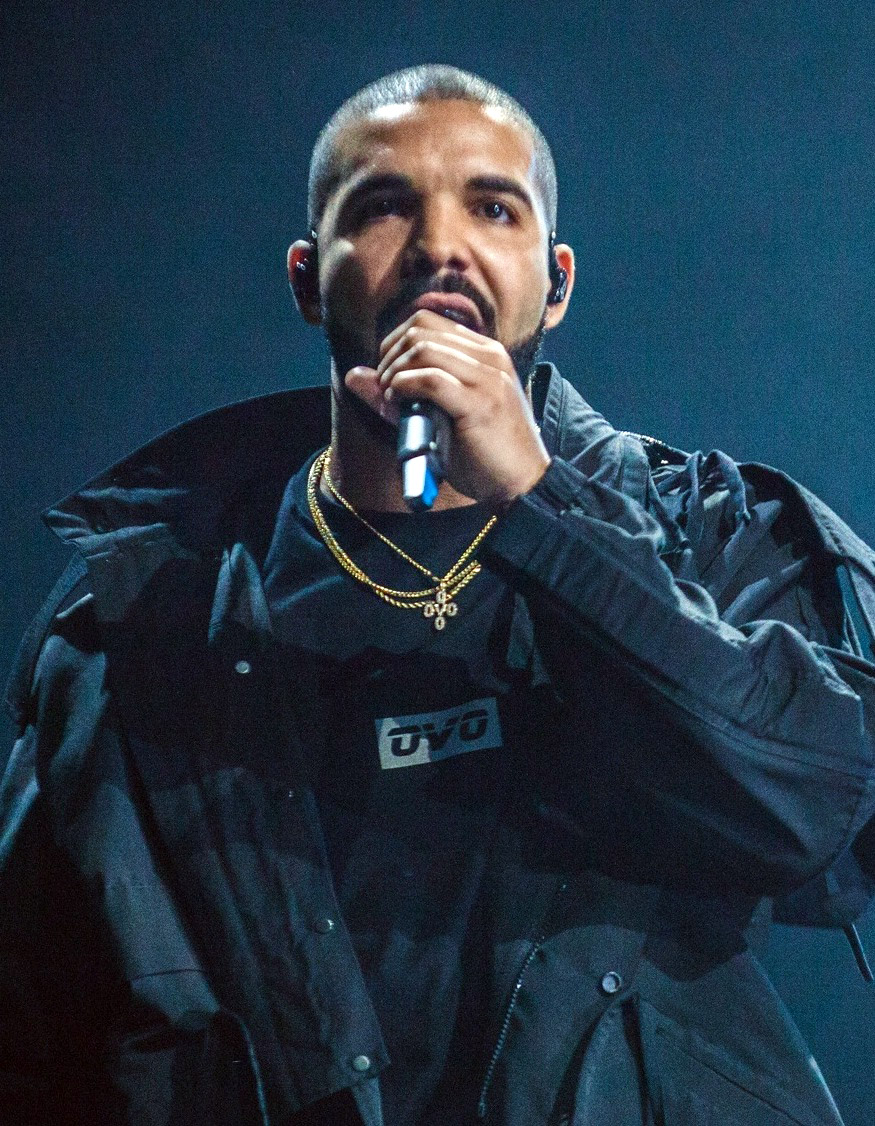
Critics often praised the chemistry between Future and Drake (pictured) on "Where Ya At".

"Where Ya At" was premiered on Zane Lowe's Apple Music 1 show on July 16, 2015, and was released as a single on iTunes in select countries the same day. It was the second single released for DS2, following "Fuck Up Some Commas" in March. The album was released a day later on July 17, with "Where Ya At" as its third track. Future performed the song alongside "Blow a Bag" on JImmy Kimmel Live! in November 2013, where he wore clothing from Kanye West's Yeezy Season 1 fashion line while backed by a five-piece band, which included a guitarist, keyboardist, and two drummers.

"Where Ya At" received positive reviews from music critics, with writers for Now and Vice considering it a highlight of DS2. Stereogum's Tom Breihan praised the track as "a drunk, dizzy banger, one that makes great use of these two dudes’ awesomely oblique sense of melody." In a list for Rolling Stone Australia, Mosi Reeves called it one of Drake's best songs, noting Drake's "golden touch" as contributing to its success, and felt that both rappers have an "uncanny vocal chemistry" together. Jack O'Keeffe of Bustle retrospectively opined in 2016 that "Where Ya At" introduced a wider audience to trap music, believing it helped the genre become mainstream alongside artists like Migos and Young Thug.

== Commercial performance ==
"Where Ya At" debuted at number 68 on the US Billboard Hot 100 on August 8, 2015, and was supported by its first-week digital download sales of 37,000 units. It peaked at number 28 on the chart, becoming Future's first top 30 single as a lead artist.

"Where Ya At" was certified double platinum by the Recording Industry Association of America (RIAA) on January 17, 2016, for sales of over four million digital copies in the United States. By June 2020, the song was certified quadruple platinum for double that amount. An update to Future's RIAA certifications on July 16, 2026 changed its status to six times platinum.

== Music video ==
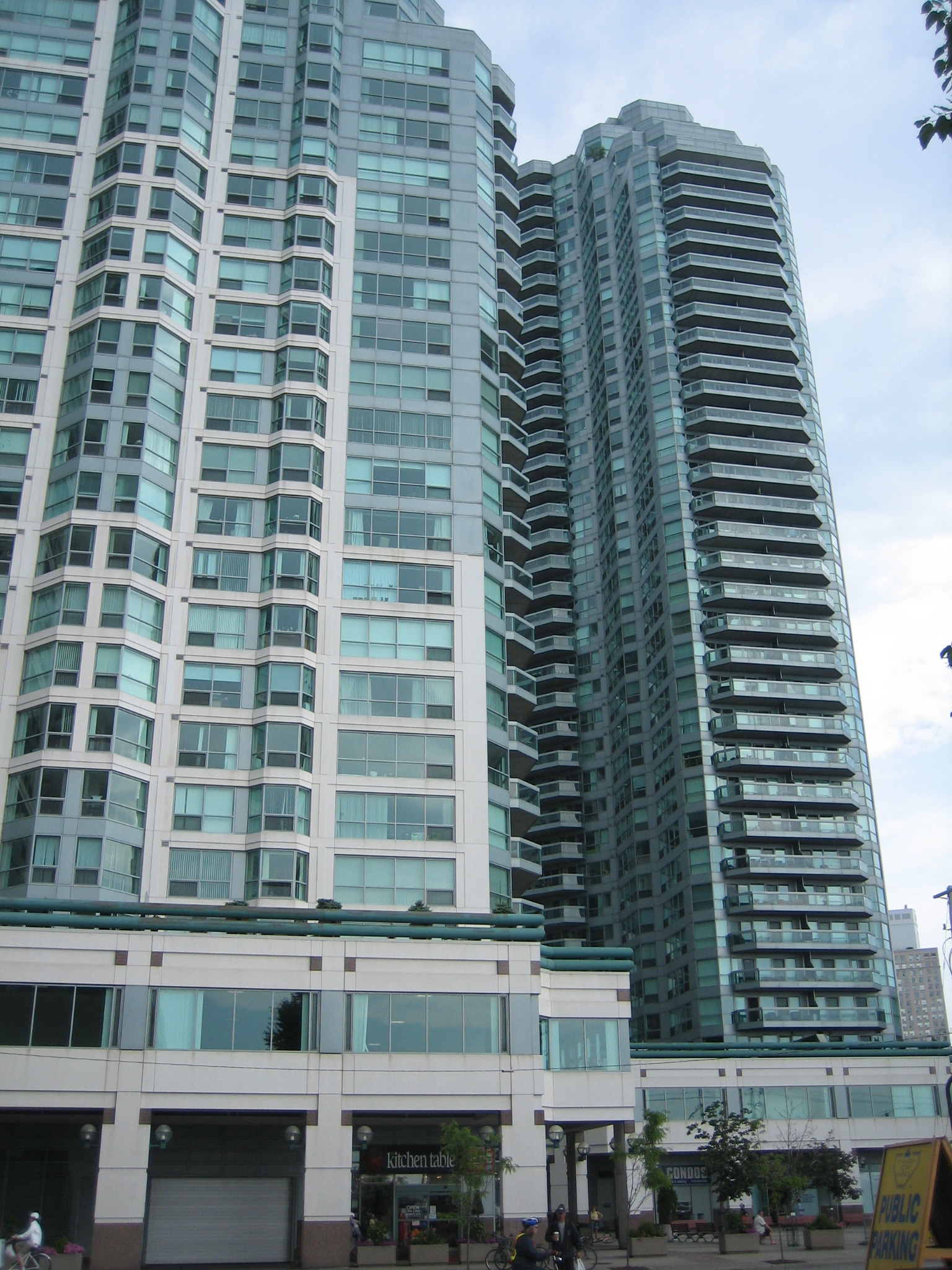
The music video for "Where Ya At" features Drake looking outside of a skyscraper.

The music video for "Where Ya At", directed by Rick Nyce, was filmed by Future and Drake in Toronto while at the latter's OVO Fest on August 4, 2015, with an official preview being posted two days later. Another teaser, showcasing behind-the-scenes footage, was shared on August 13, and confirmed that DJ Esco would make an appearance. The full video was premiered on Sony’s First View Live billboard in New York City on August 20 at 8 p.m., later being uploaded to Future's Vevo channel the same day. Alongside Esco, it features additional appearances from Metro Boomin and members of the Weeknd's XO record label.

The video opens with Future, who delivers his verse on a rooftop while Metro and Esco dance. During Drake's part, he looks out from a skyscraper before walking through a warehouse, where the visuals reference his lyrics. The video concludes with both rappers seated at an expensive roundtable dinner, toasting to their success while accompanied by Metro, Esco, and the XO members, with Future using a candle to light his cigar.

== Charts ==
Chart (2015)	Peak position
Canada Hot 100 (Billboard)	62
France (SNEP)	188
US Billboard Hot 100	28
US Hot R&B/Hip-Hop Songs (Billboard)	11
US Rhythmic Airplay (Billboard)	10

=== Year-end charts ===
Chart (2016)	Position
US Hot R&B/Hip-Hop Songs (Billboard)	76

== Certifications ==
Region	Certification	Certified units/sales
Australia (ARIA)	Gold	35,000^{‡}
Canada (Music Canada)	2× Platinum	160,000^{‡}
United Kingdom (BPI)	Silver	200,000^{‡}
United States (RIAA)	6× Platinum	6,000,000^{‡}
^{‡} Sales+streaming figures based on certification alone.
