= DJ Spinz =

American record producer, songwriter and DJ

- DJ Spinz in February 2026

Background information
- Born: Gary Rafael Hill; Augusta, Georgia, United States
- Origin: Atlanta, Georgia, United States
- Genres: Hip hop; trap; R&B
- Occupations: Record producer; songwriter; disc jockey
- Instruments: Turntables; bass; FL Studio; Logic Pro; MPC
- Years active: 2009–present

Gary Rafael Hill, known professionally as DJ Spinz, is an American record producer, songwriter and disc jockey. Spinz became a DJ in the late 2000s before shifting into music production. He has since produced the Billboard Hot 100-top 40 singles "Cashin' Out" by Cash Out and "Flex (Ooh, Ooh, Ooh)" by Rich Homie Quan, as well as the multi-platinum-certified singles "Fuck Up Some Commas" by Future, "Blasé" by Ty Dolla Sign, and "Bring It Back" by Travis Porter. He has also been credited on albums by Waka Flocka Flame, Gucci Mane, French Montana, Jacquees, Rick Ross, 2 Chainz, and Lil B, among others.

== Early life ==
Hill grew up in Augusta, Georgia. Spinz's grandmother and uncle ran a supper club and he knew the DJ there since he was three or four years old. Spinz used to watch him DJ, so it really inspired him. When Spinz was fourteen, his mother bought him his first turntables. The local radio station in Augusta would broadcast high school football games and Spinz made a good impression on the station's program director. Spinz started deejaying during the commercials breaks of the games. When Spinz was sixteen, he met DJ Scream when he went to Atlanta to a Guitar Center to buy some cables for his equipment. When he was sixteen, the program director gave Spinz his own radio spot. At the time everyone around him wanted to be a basketball player or a rapper, but deejaying stuck out to him and he wanted to be able to control the crowd. At eighteen, Hill moved away from Augusta.

== Career ==
Right after Spinz met DJ Scream, they worked together at Sirius XM Holdings. Scream put Spinz in position throughout the Atlanta scene at the time, landing him a spot in a local Marietta, GA club, which turned into Spinz meeting and breaking several artists in the Atlanta area. In 2009, Spinz shared an evening spot on Atlanta's Hot 107.9's Hoodrich Radio. Around the time he started 107.9, Spinz started going into production. He picked up a keyboard wanted to learn producing. He got to work looking to perfect his skills and expand his craft. In 2010, Spinz produced the breakout single for Travis Porter, called "Go Shorty, Go". The fame of the song encouraged Spinz to want to keep going further into production. In 2011, Spinz produced 2 Chainz', "Riot". Later in the year, Spinz also produced Ca$h Out's debut single, "Cashin' Out" and Ca$h Out wasn't signed to a label at the time.[4] From 2013 to cca. 2015 he was producing instrumentals as collaborations with the producer C4 and also a producer group 808 Mafia. Spinz is also a mixtape DJ. Spinz and his partner DJ Pretty Boy Tank, have been working on the Space Invaders mixtape series since 2006.[3] His productions have the tag "Cut it up!" voiced by his little brother.

== DJ Spinz 808 ==
The DJ Spinz 808 also known as the "Spinz 808" or "TCE Spinz 808" is a variation of a Roland TR-808 bass drum, which is credited to and named after Hill. The sound is used in hip-hop, pop, and R&B and is one of the most popular and iconic sounds in trap music. Originally created in 2011, the sample became popular with trap producers due to its low end presence, as well as good punch. It has spawned a large number of variations of its own, with varying levels of distortion, equalization, and other changes. The sample is used when pitched to a low octave to act as a bass in trap beats. The "Spinz 808" has been used by popular producers such as Metro Boomin, Pi'erre Bourne, TM88, and Wheezy. It has been featured as the bass in many songs, a notable example being the 2019 hit "Old Town Road" by Lil Nas X which reached #1 on the Billboard Hot 100 and remained at #1 for 19 weeks.

== Discography ==
=== Extended plays ===
- Trips (2015)

=== Mixtapes ===
- Heart of the City 6 (2009)
- Trench Atlanta (2009)
- Everything Based (2010) (with Lil B)
- HPG (2012)
- HPG 2 (2013)
- HPG 3 (2013)

== Production discography ==
=== Singles produced ===
List of singles as a producer or co-producer, with selected chart positions and certifications, showing year released and album name
Title	Year	Peak chart positions			Certifications	Album
Title	Year	US	US R&B	US Rap	Certifications	Album
"Bring It Back" (Travis Porter)	2011	69	18	14		From Day 1
"Cashin' Out (Cash Out)	2012	36	2	1	RIAA: Platinum	It's My Time
"Rooster in My Rari" (Waka Flocka Flame)	2012	—	—	—		Triple F Life: Friends, Fans & Family
"Honest" (Future)	2013	55	18	—	RIAA: Platinum	Honest
"She Twerkin" (Cash Out)	2014	98	28	17	RIAA: Gold	Let's Get It
"Ordinary" (Trey Songz featuring Jeezy)	2014	—	—	—		—N/a
"Break The Rules" (Future)	2014	—	—	—		—N/a
"Flex (Ooh, Ooh, Ooh)" (Rich Homie Quan)	2015	26	8	—	RIAA : 2× Platinum	If You Ever Think I Will Stop Goin' In Ask Double R
"Fuck Up Some Commas" (Future)	2015	55	14	—	RIAA: 3× Platinum	DS2
"Blasé" (Ty Dolla Sign featuring Future & Rae Sremmurd)	2015	63	20	—	RIAA: 2× Platinum	Free TC
"Bottom of the Bottle" (Currensy featuring August Alsina & Lil Wayne)	2015	97	29	—		Canal Street Confidential
"Order More" (G-Eazy featuring Starrah)	2015	— (Note: "Order More" did not enter the Billboard Hot 100, but peaked at number five on the Bubbling Under Hot 100 Singles chart, which acts as an extension to the Hot 100.)	40	—	RIAA: Platinum	When It's Dark Out
"Bake Sale" (Wiz Khalifa & Travis Scott)	2016	56	18	9	RIAA: Gold	Khalifa
"Draco" (Future)	2016	46	17	11	RIAA: Platinum	FUTURE

=== Other songs ===
List of non-singles produced, with performing artists and other credited producers, showing year released and album name
Title	Year	Artist(s)	Co-Producer(s)	Album
"Alot of Hoes"	2009	2 Chainz	none	All Ice on Me
"We in Dis Bitch"	2010	Rich Kid Shawty	none	Word in da South
"Meant to Be"	2010	Big Sean	none	Finally Famous Vol. 3: Big
"Pop Them Bands"	2011	Future	none	Dirty Sprite
"Homicide"	2011	Wiz Khalifa; Chevy Woods	RMB Juztice	Cabin Fever
"Freeband Gang"	2011	Future	none	True Story
"Atlanta Girl"	2011	Waka Flocka Flame; Slim Dunkin; Quez	none	Twin Towers 2: No Fly Zone
"Riot"	2011	2 Chainz	none	T.R.U. REALigion
"Ring Ring"	2012	Rick Ross; Future	none	Rich Forever
"Blow"	2012	Future; Ludacris; Rocko	none	Astronaut Status
"Non Else to Do"	2012	Rich Kidz	none	Everybody Eat Bread
"Motivation"	2012	Plies	none	On Trial
"You Deserve It"	2012	Future	Nard & B	Pluto
"She Got It"	2012	K Camp	none	Fan 4 Life
"Don't Make No Sense"	2012	Gucci Mane; 8Ball; Fabolous	none	I'm Up
"Lurking With Roosters"	2012	Starlito	none	Post Traumatic Stress
"April Fools"	2012	DJ 864; Mr. Sipp; Ca$h Out	none	Realezt on the Rize 3
"Disqualified"	2012	Yo Gotti; Wale	none	CM7: The World Is Yours
"Gas and Mud"	2012	Gucci Mane	C4	Trap God
"Nacho$"	2012	Rocko	none	Wordplay
"We On"	2013	BankRoll	Nard & B	Hustler's Dream Every Hater's Nightmare
"Counting Money	2013	Project Pat; Nasty Mane	none	Cheez n Dope
"Nothin' On Ya"	2013	Gucci Mane; Wiz Khalifa	C4	Trap God 2
"Pistol In The Party"	2013	Gucci Mane	C4	Trap God 2
"I'm a Dawg"	2013	Chaz Gotti; Guwop	none	Voice of Dunk
"Can't Handle Me"	2013	Gucci Mane; Young Dolph; Young Scooter	Southside	EastAtlantaMemphis
"Thirsty"	2013	Gucci Mane	C4	Trap Back 2
"Dumb Fine"	2013	Gucci Mane	C4	Trap Back 2
"Full Of It"	2013	Gucci Mane	none	Trap Back 2
"Problem"	2013	Sonny Digital; Que; Ali	Metro Boomin	Forbes Atlanta
"On Me"	2013	Strap da Fool; Shawty Lo	none	All In
"Das Right"	2013	Strap da Fool	none	All In
"Fuck Friends"	2013	Strap da Fool	none	All In
"Lunchin' Azz Niggas"	2013	V Stash	none	Growth and Development
"Hands on U"	2013	Future	Killah Kalam	Black Woodstock: The Soundtrack
"Work"	2013	August Alsina; Roscoe Dash	John "$K" McGee	The Product 2
"Get Ya Money"	2013	August Alsina; Fabolous	Dun Deal	The Product 2; Testimony
"Inhale"	2013	August Alsina	Dun Deal	The Product 2
"Poppin' Sum"	2013	Young Dro; B.o.B; Yung Booke	none	G.D.O.D. (Get Dough or Die)
"2018"	2026	Future	none	The Real Me
