= Fuck Up Some Commas =

Single by Future

from the album DS2 and the mixtape Monster
- Released: March 2, 2015
- Recorded: October 2014
- Genre: Trap
- Length: 3:57
- Label: A1; Freebandz; Epic
- Songwriters: Nayvadius Wilburn; Gary Hill; Joshua Luellen
- Producers: DJ Spinz; Southside

Future singles chronology
"Let Me Know" (2014)	"Fuck Up Some Commas" (2015)	"3500" (2015)

"Fuck Up Some Commas" (shortened to "Commas" for the clean version) is a song by the American rapper Future. It first appeared as a track on his 2014 mixtape Monster before being released as the lead single from his third studio album, DS2 (2015), on March 2, 2015. The track's beat started out as a piano melody made by DJ Spinz that producer Southside chopped and added drums to, which was subsequently sent to Future and immediately recorded on. A trap song, its lyrics regard Future's spending of money, with the phrase "fuck up some commas" being in reference to the comma punctuation mark in large numbers.

"Fuck Up Some Commas" received acclaim from music critics, and helped revive Future's career after his highly publicized divorce from American singer Ciara, as it became a sleeper hit months after the release of Monster and was the rapper's first charting single. Since its release, it has been cited as one of Future's best songs and the track that mainstreamed sampling sirens from the Ironside theme song in Atlanta trap music. Motion Family directed a music video that released on March 27, 2015, featuring cameo appearances from several rappers and the song's producers. It went on to receive two remixes: an official one featuring Big Sean and Rick Ross, and an unofficial one by Lil Wayne.

== Background and recording ==
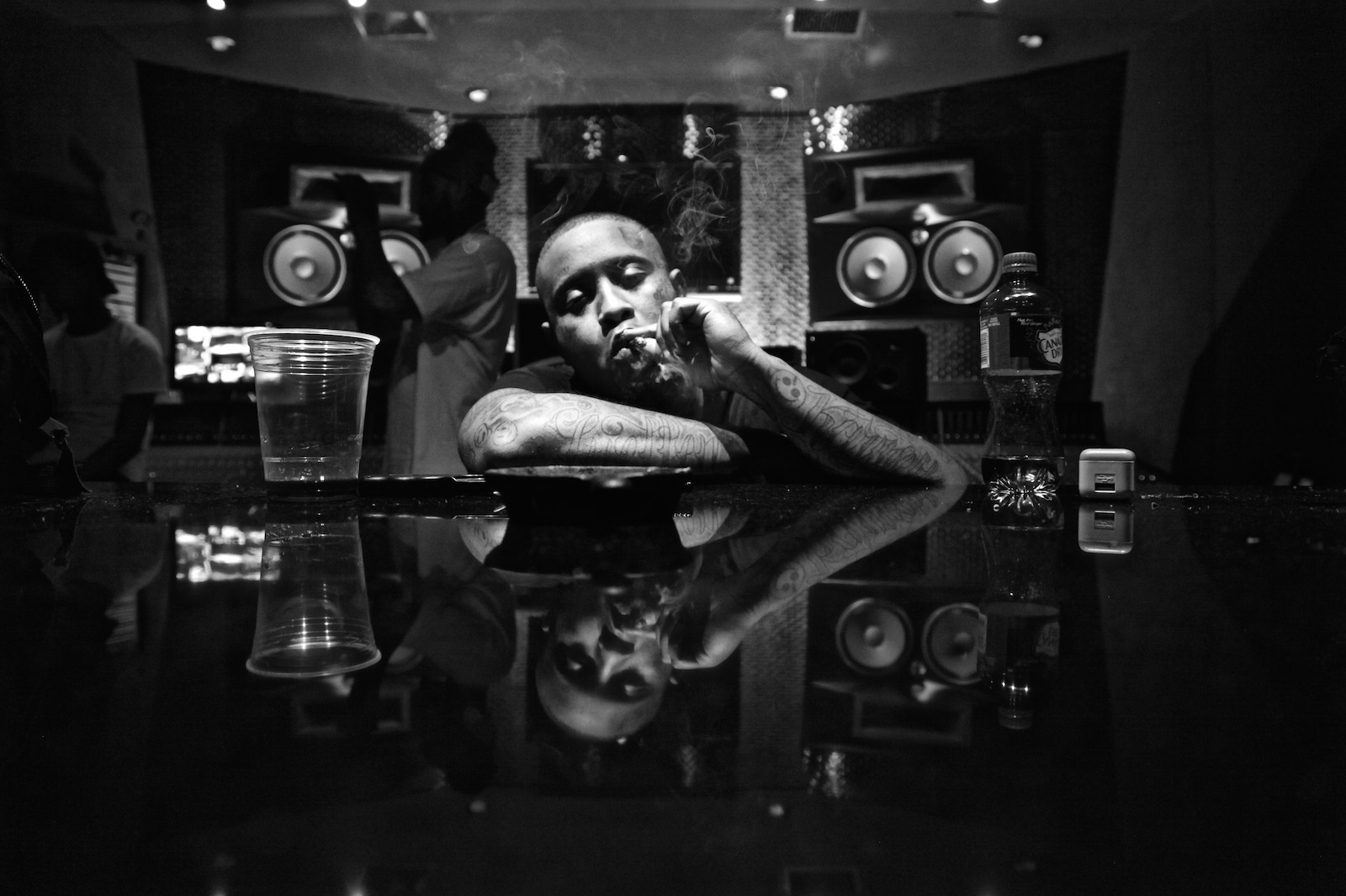
Producer Southside (pictured) created the beat for "Fuck Up Some Commas" using a piano melody made by DJ Spinz.

According to producer Southside, "Fuck Up Some Commas" started out as a fast-paced piano melody made by DJ Spinz in October 2014. The latter called Southside the same day, asking him to drive to his condominium, where the producer chopped up the melody and added drums over it. DJ Spinz subsequently drove off with a hard drive containing the beat to show it to Future, who almost immediately recorded for it; Southside later recalled that Future must have known "that shit [would be] a hit". Future's thirteenth mixtape, Monster, released on October 28, with "Fuck Up Some Commas" as the fifth track.

According to engineer Seth Firkins, who recorded Future's vocals on "Fuck Up Some Commas", he and the rapper always used a setup featuring a Neumann U 87 Ai microphone, which ran through a Neve 1073 mixing console and a Tube-Tech CL1B compressor. If the two were unable to get those exact models at a recording studio, they would leave for one that did. Future's vocals were recorded as a mono track in Pro Tools, where he then applied AutoTune and other stock audio plug-ins.

== Composition and lyrics ==
Musically, "Fuck Up Some Commas" is a dark trap song featuring "disturbing" piano keys. Its sirens are sampled from the Ironside theme song by Quincy Jones, which Southside's production group, 808 Mafia, first began sampling for Young Thug's 2014 track "Danny Glover". (Note: The Ironside sample is not present on the released version of "Danny Glover".) According to member TM88, sampling the Ironside theme's sirens was inspired by its usage in the film Kill Bill: Volume 1 (2003), which the group found to sound "crazy": "It just psyches your mind out or some shit—it gets you real amped, and ready for the fight, like some real ill shit finna happen!"

The phrase "fuck up some commas" is in reference to how large numbers have more commas when written, translating into the amount of money Future has when he raps about spending it. He explained in his Like I Never Left documentary series that he saw the song as "motivational", stating that he "wanted the average person to feel like they wanna fuck up some commas" when listening to it.

== Release and commercial performance ==
"Fuck Up Some Commas" was released as a single through the iTunes Store on March 2, 2015, alongside the edited clean version, serving as the lead single for Future's third studio album, DS2 (2015). His first single to chart on US Billboard Hot 100, it entered the chart on April 18 and peaked at number 55, spending a total of 20 weeks on the chart, also making number 14 on the Hot R&B/Hip-Hop Songs chart. Rolling Stone's Christopher Weingarten retrospectively referred to it as a "surprise hit", with the song only gaining traction months after the release of Monster. Its success helped Future regain his popularity, as his career was nearly ended by the "chilled" reception to Honest (2014) and his highly publicized divorce from American singer Ciara.

== Critical reception and legacy ==
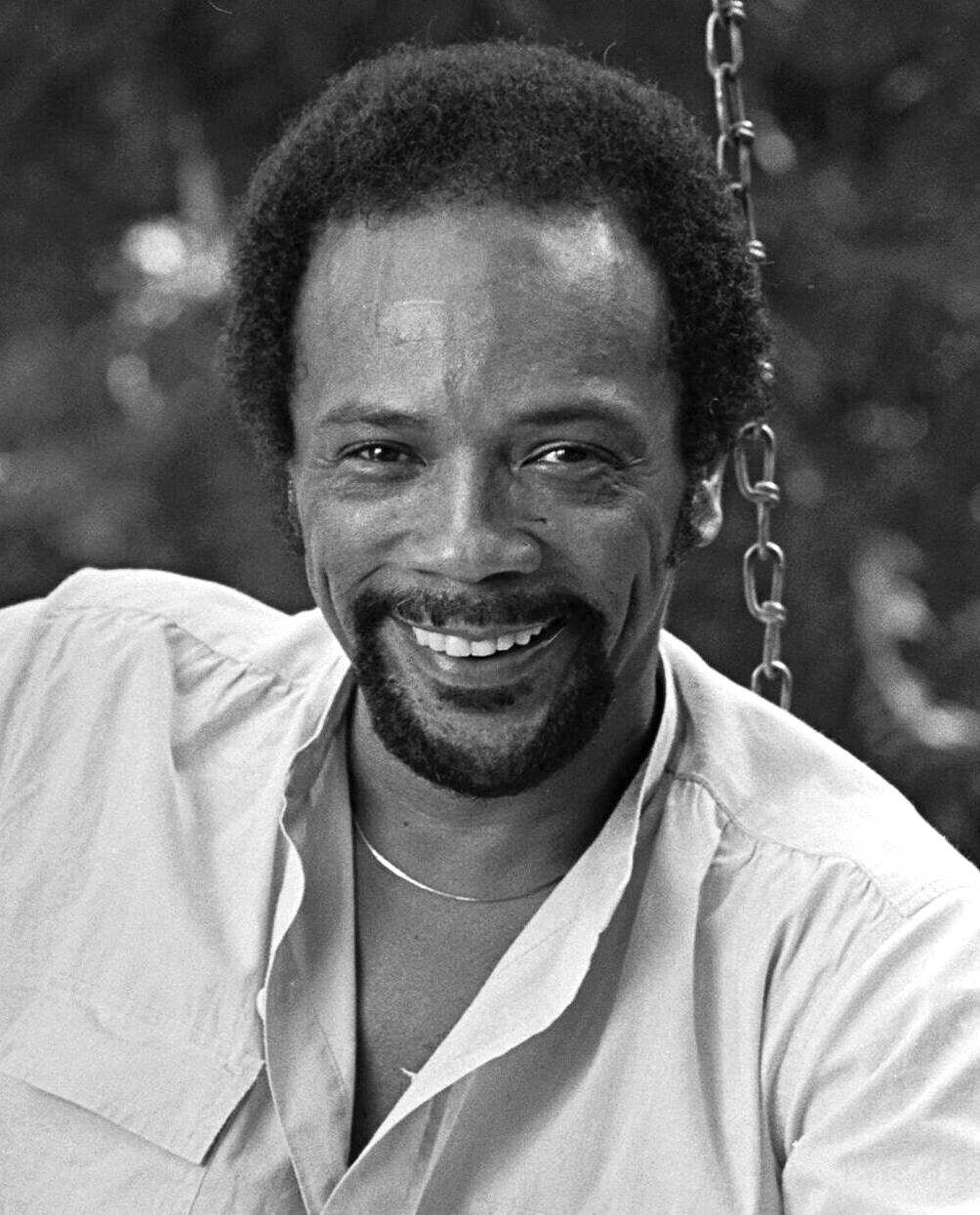
"Fuck Up Some Commas" helped mainstream the sampling of the Ironside theme song in trap music, originally composed by Quincy Jones.

"Fuck Up Some Commas" received acclaim from music critics. In a review of Monster, Sam C. Mac of Slant Magazine wrote that the track was "ruthlessly catchy" and an "anthem for rap as aural expression rather than lyrical, shaping and reshaping his flow like the contents of a lava lamp." The Verge's Micah Singleton praised it as the best track on DS2, stating that the rest of that album's tracks felt like "leftovers" in comparison when considering its age. Pitchfork similarly called the song the best from Monster, with writer Kathy Iandoli arguing: "[it proves] that Future’s [F]reebandz offered him the opportunity to hand out album-quality singles pro bono." In a list of the 50 best songs of 2015, Rolling Stone ranked it at number 8, dubbing its beat a "banger".

"Fuck Up Some Commas" has since been named one of Future's best songs by several music publications, including HotNewHipHop, XXL, and Complex; the latter's Paul Thompson described it as "sitting in a strip club and realizing the walls are closing in around you. It’s performative partying, fatalistic consumption." The song helped popularize the use of the Ironside siren in Atlanta trap music, with Filip Kalinowski of Newonce arguing that its beat was one of the most important in the history of hip-hop as a result. TM88 agreed with the former statement, citing the track as when the siren took off "[o]n the mainstream level".

On June 10, 2020, "Fuck Up Some Commas" was certified triple platinum by the Recording Industry Association of America (RIAA) for sales of over three million units in the United States, following the original double platinum certification in April 2017. An update to Future's RIAA certifications on July 16, 2026 changed its status to five times platinum.

== Music video ==
A music video for the song, directed by Motion Family, was released on March 27, 2015. The video features cameo appearances by Boosie Badazz, Young Scooter, Metro Boomin, and Curtis Williams, alongside DJ Spinz and Southside. Rap-Up called the video "showy", while Zach Frydenlud of Complex called it "extravagant".

== Remixes ==
The official remix for "Fuck Up Some Commas", featuring additional verses from American rappers Big Sean and Rick Ross, was premiered on Power 106 by disc jockey Eric D-Lux on May 25, 2026, before being uploaded to SoundCloud later in the night. Future's original verses are largely cut, with him mainly appearing on the refrain. Ross's verse features braggadocious raps about Maybachs, cocaine, and white women, while Sean uses a "rapid fire flow" and mentions that he used to drive a Honda car. Prior to its release, American rapper Lil Wayne shared his own remix in April, where he celebrates his freedom from former label Cash Money Records and targets co-founder Birdman.

== Track listing ==
- Digital download (Explicit version)
1. "F*ck Up Some Commas" – 3:57
- Digital download (Clean version)
1. "Commas" – 3:56

== Credits and personnel ==
Credits are adapted from Tidal.

- Nayvadius WIlburn (Future) – songwriting, vocals
- Gary Hill (DJ Spinz) – songwriting, production
- Joshua Luellen (Southside) – songwriting, production
- Jeremy D. Brown – additional studio producer, assistant engineer
- Niles Roberts – assistant engineer
- Tyler Kumpee – assistant engineer
- Seth Firkins – recording engineer, mixing engineer
- Eric Manco – mixing engineer
- Glenn Schick – mastering engineer

== Charts ==
Chart (2015)	Peak position
US Billboard Hot 100	55
US Hot R&B/Hip-Hop Songs (Billboard)	14

== Certifications ==
Region	Certification	Certified units/sales
Canada (Music Canada)	2× Platinum	160,000^{‡}
United Kingdom (BPI)	Silver	200,000^{‡}
United States (RIAA)	5× Platinum	5,000,000^{‡}
^{‡} Sales+streaming figures based on certification alone.
