= Codeine Crazy =

Song by Future

from the album Monster
- Released: October 28, 2014
- Genre: Trap
- Length: 5:46
- Label: Freebandz
- Songwriters: Nayvadius Wilburn; Bryan Simmons
- Producer: TM88

Music video
- "Codeine Crazy" on YouTube

"Codeine Crazy" is a song by American rapper Future. It is the final track from his thirteenth mixtape, Monster (2014). A trap song produced by TM88, it features Future rapping about his addiction to the recreational drug lean (or "purple drank"), a cocktail of codeine, promethazine, and soda. "Codeine Crazy" is among Future's most critically acclaimed songs, and both it and its music video, released in 2015, are considered cult classics. In 2022, the song was certified Gold by the Recording Industry Association of America (RIAA).

== Background and release ==
Future rose to mainstream prominence in hip-hop with the release of Pluto in 2012. However, despite his second album, Honest (2014), being largely well received by critics, it proved unpopular with the hip-hop community and was criticized for lacking substance and having a pop-influenced sound. During that same period, Future went through a breakup with his fiancée, the singer Ciara. Although his reputation was damaged, he made a major recovery during 2014–2015 with the release of three mixtapes, the first of which was Monster, a project that catered to his original fans by returning to drug-influenced themes.

Monster was originally released on October 28, 2014, through Future's record label, Freebandz. Originally, it was only available on YouTube and mixtape-hosting websites like DatPiff and Spinrilla, before it was released to streaming services in 2019 for its five-year anniversary. "Codeine Crazy" is the final track on the mixtape.

== Composition and lyrics ==
A trap song in the key of F-sharp minor, "Codeine Crazy" was produced by TM88, who is also credited as a songwriter alongside Future. TM88 originally produced the instrumental for Nicki Minaj before giving it to Future. Dallas Donnell of Southern Cultures describes it as a "somber, methodical beat—where the sound of surging air pulses beneath gentle synths that stab in and out of the mix like needles". It samples Cedric Gervais's 2013 remix of "Summertime Sadness" by Lana Del Rey, as well as the widely sampled Ironside theme song by Quincy Jones.

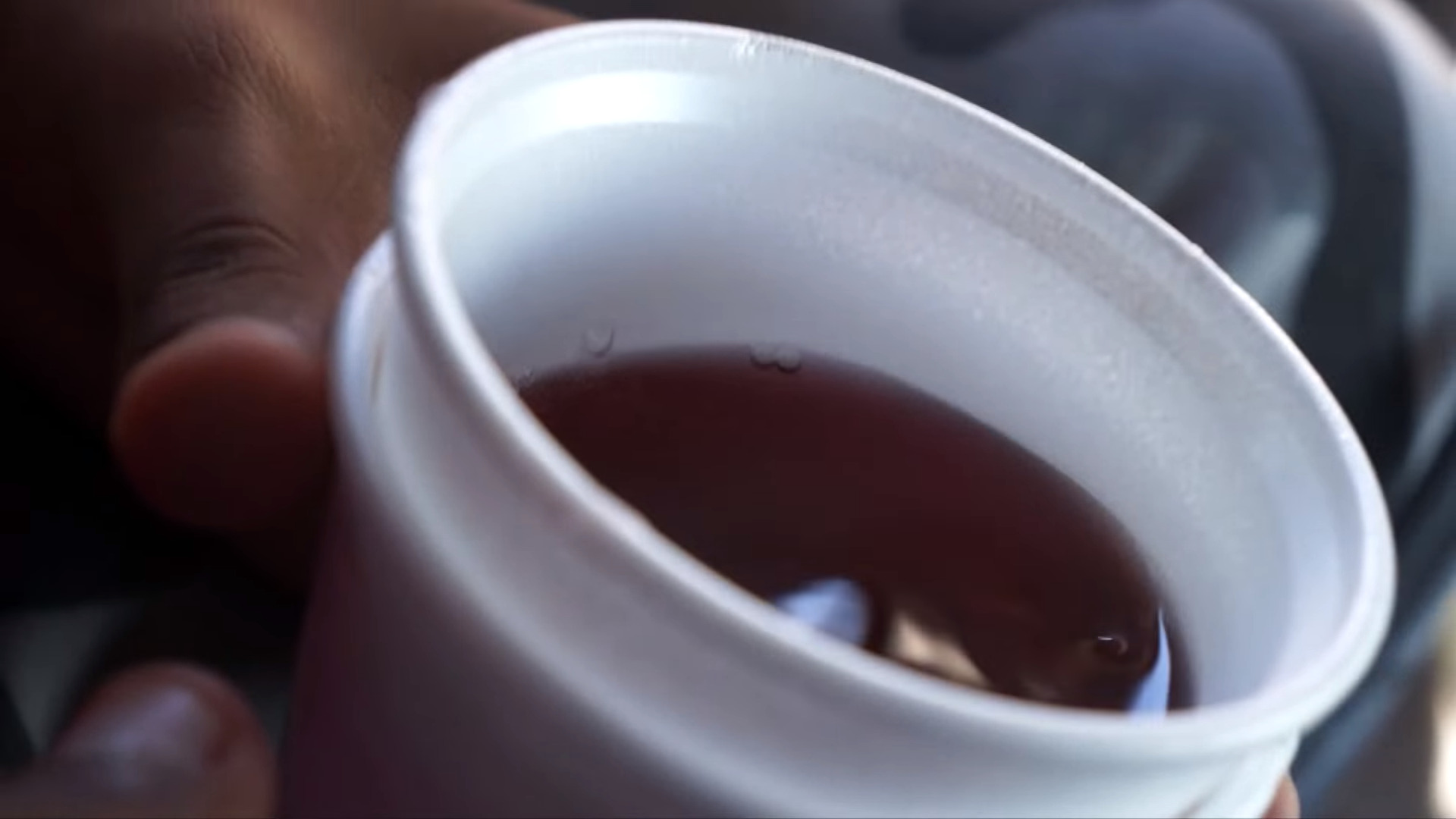
"Codeine Crazy" revolves around addiction to lean.

Performed with his characteristic use of AutoTune, multiple different flows, and a slurred, mournful voice, Future's lyrics deal with addiction to lean, a drink consisting of codeine, promethazine, and soda. The song contains themes of heartbreak and guilt, with Future using sex, alcohol, and money, in addition to lean, as ways to cope. He acknowledges that he is an addict and that this could lead to his death, but he finds himself unwilling to quit. According to Luke Hinz of HotNewHipHop, there is a disconnect between Future's lyrics and what he truly means, and his boastful lyrics mask an underlying emotional pain. Hinz describes "Codeine Crazy" as "a track that so badly wants to be a redemption story, a scathing dismissal of his past love" that is instead "a purple-tinged purgatory".

== Reception and legacy ==
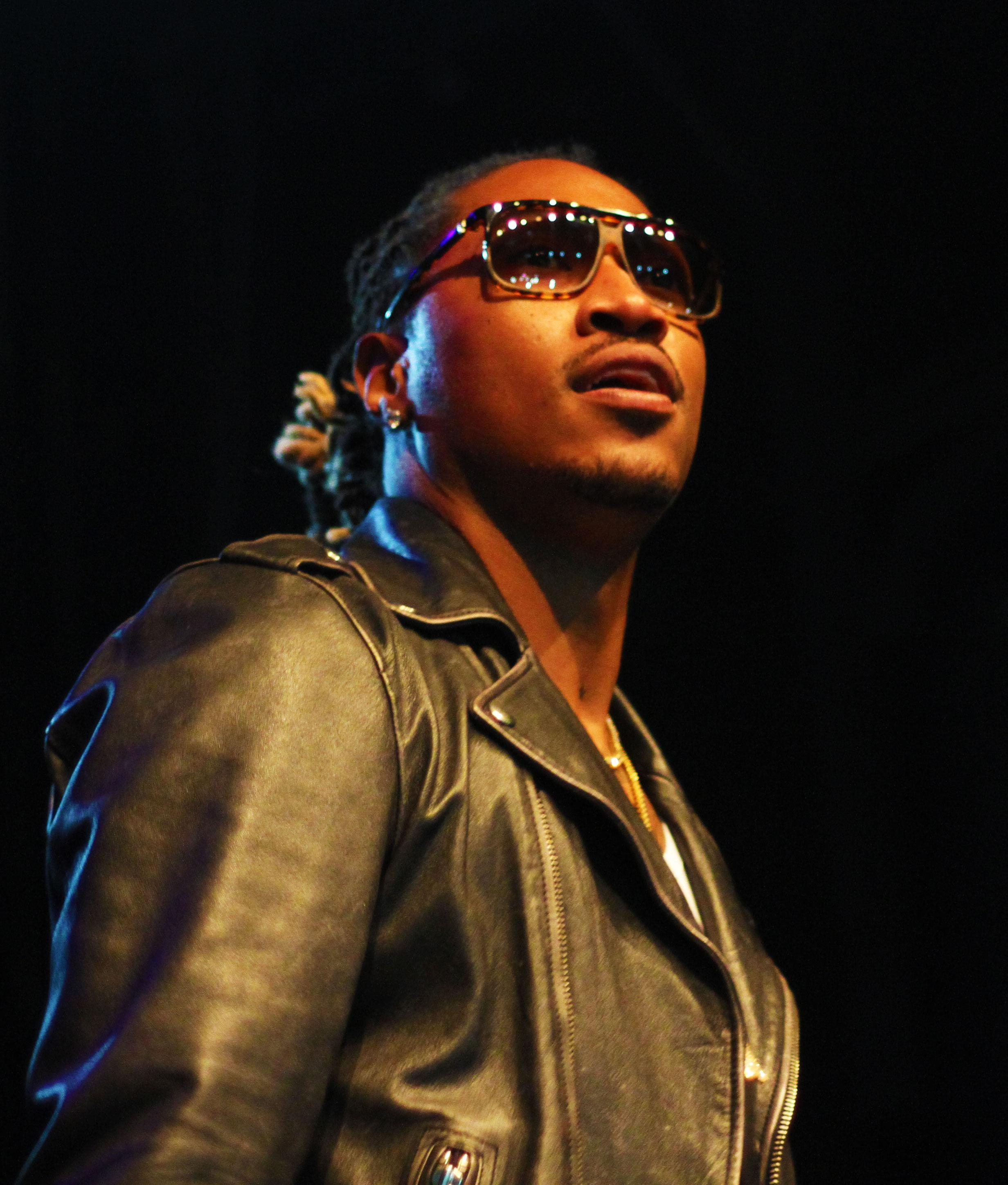
"Codeine Crazy" marked the beginning of a highly successful period for Future.

"Codeine Crazy" is one of Future's most critically acclaimed songs. It marked the beginning of a significantly successful period in his career, thus attaining the status of a cult classic among a large share of both his fanbase and broader hip-hop audiences. Its music video, released in 2015, has also been described as a cult classic. In 2017, "Codeine Crazy" was added to the video game Grand Theft Auto V and its online version as part of Frank Ocean's radio station. This, along with the streaming re-release of Monster in 2019, contributed towards renewed interest in the song. In 2022, it was certified Gold by the Recording Industry Association of America (RIAA).

Reviewing Monster upon its original release in 2014, BET's Jake Rohn criticized "Codeine Crazy" as an unoriginal take on drug use, itself a common lyrical theme in hip-hop. By early 2015, Complex referred to the song as one of many fan favorites from the mixtape, and, by mid-2015, Vice called it "one of the best songs of the past year". In an article for the one-year anniversary of Monster, Pitchfork's Meaghan Garvey praised "Codeine Crazy" as "the rawest, most beautiful rap song of 2014". She considered it the peak of Future's emotional transparency and wondered why its "petty lines about taking a girl to Chipotle" were what initially drew the most attention when the song explored topics like addiction and suicide, noting that she, too, only realized its brilliance months after its release. Garvey added that "Yams knew", referencing the final tweet of the late ASAP Yams, which read "Bodeine Brazy".

In 2018, Complex ranked "Codeine Crazy" as Future's best song. According to the magazine's Paul Thompson, the song allowed Future's contemporary work that dealt with partying and excess to be viewed in a different light, making it apparent that these themes were in no way "meaningful or helpful or a metaphor for healing". Thompson wrote that "Codeine Crazy" aimed to change the public perception of Future, who had been variously seen "as a romantic, a villain, a pop star, a monster", and he further remarked that it felt voyeuristic, as it prompted "the uncomfortable discussion about what it means to peer in and draw pleasure from someone else's pain".

Writing for HotNewHipHop in 2018, Luke Hinz called the song "masterful". Describing it as "peak trap" and one of the subgenre's "lasting contributions", he commended its "surprising focus" compared to Future's other songs that were named after lean. He called Future "astonishingly coherent" and, similar to other critics, praised his emotional transparency and found the song to be voyeuristic. Hinz was also highly complimentary of the production. Multiple other HotNewHipHop writers have opined on "Codeine Crazy", including Mitch Findlay, who has called it "arguably" Future's best-written song, and Aron A., who has praised it as "one of the greatest songs of all time".

In a 2019 article about the sounds that defined 2010s music, Rolling Stone's Emily Blake included what she called "sounds as lyrics in rap": the unclear, drunken-like enunciation that was criticized by many as "mumble rap" but nonetheless remained popular. Blake named "Codeine Crazy" as where this style was done best.

Writing in 2019 for the five-year anniversary of Monster, Micah Peters of The Ringer praised "Codeine Crazy" as the "crowning achievement" of the mixtape, a "fucked up" song that serves as "a long, uninterrupted moment of lucidity after 40 or so minutes of shitfaced rage and denial". Two years later, in 2021, the publication ranked "Codeine Crazy" as the ninth-best rap song of the 2010s.

== Music video ==
The music video for "Codeine Crazy", directed by Uncle Leff (Vincent Lou), was released on February 23, 2015, as part of #MonsterMonday, Future's weekly series of music video and song releases. It makes use of pink and purple colors and blurry effects meant to simulate the effects of lean, with Exclaim! calling it "a little warped", noting that it matches the song's "twisted-up, melted-synth" production.

The video begins with Future alone and highly inebriated in a club at a New Year's Eve party, where he passes out, dressed in a tuxedo. He then appears in a field, lying down and dressed in white, where he is woken up by a woman, also dressed in white. He is holding a cup of lean, the sky is violet-colored, and there are horses in the background. The woman walks Future to the gravesite of OG Double, a member of Freebandz who was shot and killed in 2013; Future raps over his grave and pours out liquor. Following more rapping scenes, the video ends with Future inside a high-rise apartment alongside another woman.

=== Reception ===
Writing for Pitchfork in 2015, Meaghan Garvey gave high praise to the "Codeine Crazy" video, calling it "[Future's] best video of all time, and probably the best music video ever made". In an article for MTV News the next year, she was more measured in her praise, describing it as "undoubtedly" the best rap video that had yet been released in the 2010s and as a cult classic. Garvey wrote that she could not stop thinking about it and pointed to its YouTube comments as an indication that neither could other Future fans. She noted that the comments were "atypically sincere" and that they contained a five-month-long thread where people were encouraging a commenter to quit lean and find a job.

According to Garvey, the song was "a lot on its own", and it took the video for everything to "click"; similarly, she credited the video for causing people to start paying attention to Monster.

=== Director interview ===
Garvey interviewed Uncle Leff for MTV. According to Leff, the club scenes were filmed at Club Mansion in Atlanta, Georgia, while the field scenes were filmed in a plot of land around South Fulton. Speaking about what inspired the video, Leff cited his first acid trip, which he said took place around the same time as the filming and felt like a rebirth. He further cited the animated series Rugrats, specifically the episode "Chuckie's Wonderful Life", in which Chuckie wonders what life would look like without him before getting to witness that alongside an angel version of himself. Leff described the video as the old Future passing out and then being reborn in the field, likening the woman accompanying him to a "Chuckie Finster, walking him through the life".

Speaking about how he came to direct the video, Leff said that he and his team were repeatedly listening to "Codeine Crazy" during a road trip the month it was released, and when he ran into the brand manager of Freebandz soon thereafter, he asked her who was going to direct the video; according to Leff, the manager immediately contacted Future, who agreed to work with Leff. This collaboration led to Leff and his team also working on the music videos for Future's "Kno the Meaning" and "The Percocet & Stripper Joint" and as creative directors for his Purple Reign tour.

== Covers and other songs ==
=== Vic Mensa ===
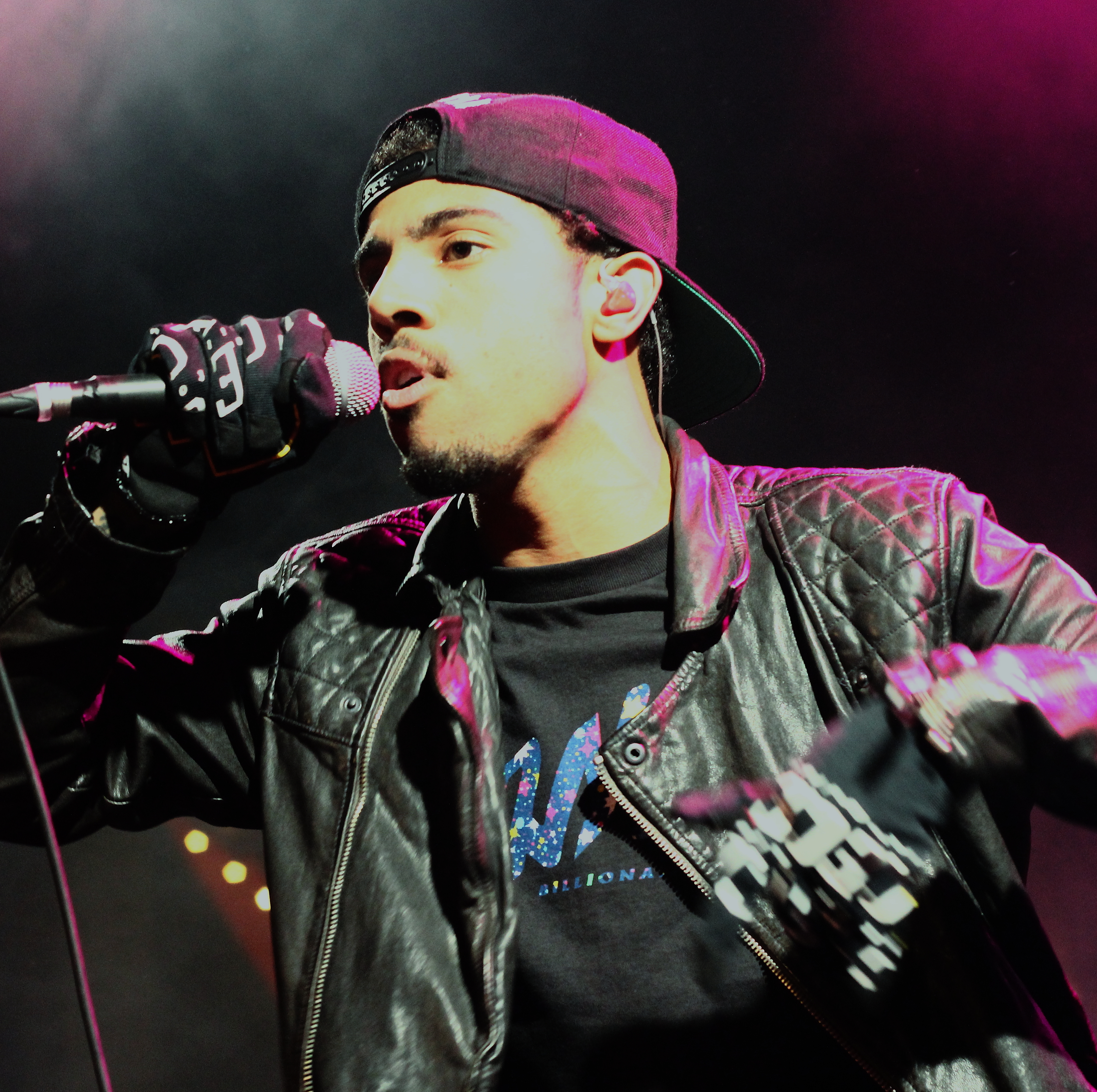
Vic Mensa released a cover of "Codeine Crazy" in 2015.

On July 22, 2015, the rapper Vic Mensa released a cover of "Codeine Crazy", titled "Codeine Crazy (Icarus Story)", on his SoundCloud. He had previously debuted it at Pitchfork Music Festival a few days prior. Mensa's cover is significantly altered from the original, although, according to Stereogum, it retains "the general feeling of floating into oblivion". It features electric guitars, intense drums, and original verses with personal lyrical content, including themes of drugs, love, and dreams. It was covered positively by Vice, who cited it as supporting their longstanding claim that Mensa was "a goddamn superstar".

=== Rich Amiri ===
In 2023, the rapper Rich Amiri released a song titled "Codeine Crazy". When asked by a Complex interviewer—who considered it a clear reference to Future—why he wanted to use the title of "one of [Future's] most legendary songs", Rich Amiri replied:

I didn't even realize it until after the song was made. I have that little part where I said, "New drink coming in, codeine crazy." Maybe I was subconsciously—but I wasn't really thinking about the Future song. I just felt like it was a recognizable title, so I put it, it wasn't really much to it.

== Certifications ==
Certifications for "Codeine Crazy"
Region	Certification	Certified units/sales
New Zealand (RMNZ)	Gold	15,000^{‡}
United States (RIAA)	Platinum	1,000,000^{‡}
^{‡} Sales+streaming figures based on certification alone.
