= 56 Nights =

Mixtape by DJ Esco and Future
- Released: March 21, 2015
- Genres: Hip hop; trap
- Length: 30:46
- Label: Freebandz
- Producers: DJ Esco; DJ Spinz; DY; Southside; Tarentino

DJ Esco chronology
No Sleep (2013)	56 Nights (2015)	Project E.T. (2016)

Future chronology
Beast Mode (2015)	56 Nights (2015)	DS2 (2015)

Singles from 56 Nights
- 1. "March Madness" Released: August 31, 2015

56 Nights is a mixtape by American rapper and singer Future in collaboration with DJ and record producer DJ Esco. It was released on March 21, 2015, through Future's Freebandz label. Although he raps on all tracks, it was not principally credited to him, but rather Esco, and is credited as being hosted by Future. It was exclusively produced by 808 Mafia, whose founding member, Southside, handled the majority of the production and was credited as an executive producer. "March Madness" was released on August 31, 2015, as its only single. It is Future's fifteenth mixtape and Esco's fifth.

== Background ==
The mixtape's name, cover artwork, and release are all inspired by DJ Esco's 2014 arrest and eventual prison sentence for possession of marijuana in the Dubai airport. After being stopped and searched while leaving the airport, police officers found 15 grams of marijuana in one of his pieces of luggage. Though he at first assumed the ordeal would be over quickly, Esco ended up spending 56 days in an Abu Dhabi prison before being released and returning to the United States on January 13, 2015. The sentence was both grueling and inspiring. In an interview with FADER magazine after his release, Esco describes how in the prison he met former Taliban members, overcame a severe language barrier by learning Arabic, and even became so well liked by his fellow inmates that on the day of his release, the two largest gangs within the prison walked him out together with raucous cheers.

The timing of Esco's arrest was significant to the career of rapper Future because of a hard drive that was in Esco's possession at the time. The hard drive contained over 400 songs that he and Future had worked on and when he was arrested and the drive was confiscated, all possible releases for the artists had to be delayed. Future references this on his song "Kno the Meaning" from his third studio album, DS2, when he says in the intro, "People didn't even understand that my hard drives that I recorded all my music on, for two years straight, was on this one hard drive that DJ Esco had". Esco describes how while in prison, one of the songs on the hard drive (which would later become the hit song "March Madness") became the only piece of music he could remember. Upon his release, he purchased a pair of headphones and played the song over and over on his flight back to America. After reconnecting with Future, the pair immediately decided to release 56 Nights together, pulling only songs from the now recovered hard drive, naming the mixtape after the length of Esco's time in prison and using Arabic text to create the cover artwork in reference to his new understanding of the language. "March Madness" was released as its sole single.

== Critical reception and impact ==
56 Nights was completed right before Future performed at SXSW in 2015 in Austin, Texas. It was well received by critics and was given a score of 7.3 by Pitchfork. It is seen as the final piece of a trilogy of album-quality mixtapes from Future that includes Monster and Beast Mode. On April 9, 2020, Future released 56 Nights on all music streaming services, making the mixtape widely available for the first time ever.

== Track listing ==
All tracks written by Nayvadius Wilburn (Future) and Joshua Luellen (Southside) and produced by Southside, except where noted.

No.	Title	Writer(s)	Producer(s)	Length
1.	"Free at Last"			1:21
2.	"Never Gon Lose"	Wilburn; Luellen; Dwan Avery	Southside; DY^{[a]}	3:07
3.	"Purple Coming In"			4:23
4.	"Diamonds from Africa"			2:46
5.	"Now"			2:42
6.	"No Compadre"			3:33
7.	"March Madness"	Wilburn; Chance Youngblood	Tarentino	4:42
8.	"Trap Niggas"			2:55
9.	"Da Fam on da Gram"	Wilburn; William Moore	DJ Esco	1:22
10.	"56 Nights"		Southside; DJ Spinz	3:55
Total length:				30:46

Streaming version
No.	Title	Length
1.	"Never Gon Lose"	3:07
2.	"Purple Come In"	3:15
3.	"Diamonds from Africa"	2:46
4.	"Now"	2:41
5.	"No Compadre"	3:37
6.	"56 Nights"	3:55
7.	"March Madness"	4:04
Total length:		23:21

=== Notes ===
- ^{^[a]} signifies a co-producer.
