= Beast Mode 2 =

Mixtape by Future and Zaytoven
- Released: July 6, 2018
- Recorded: 2016–2018
- Genre: Hip-hop; trap
- Length: 31:44
- Label: Freebandz; Epic
- Producer: Zaytoven

Future chronology
Superfly (Original Motion Picture Soundtrack) (2018)	Beast Mode 2 (2018)	Wrld on Drugs (2018)

Beast Mode 2 (stylized as BEASTMODE 2) is a commercial mixtape by American rapper Future and American record producer Zaytoven. It was released on July 6, 2018, by Freebandz and Epic Records for streaming and digital download, produced in its entirety by Zaytoven. It is the sequel to Future and Zaytoven's 2015 mixtape Beast Mode, and succeeds the release of the 2017 studio albums Future and Hndrxx, as well as collaborative mixtape Super Slimey with Young Thug and the soundtrack to 2018 film Superfly. The mixtape consists of nine tracks and includes a guest appearance by Young Scooter.

Beast Mode 2 received generally positive reviews from critics and debuted at number three on the US Billboard 200 with 57,000 album-equivalent units.

== Background ==
In January 2015, Future released the mixtape Beast Mode in collaboration with producer Zaytoven, which was released to critical acclaim.

The mixtape was originally announced in 2016, titled Beast Mode 16, with the song "Used to This" featuring Drake serving as the lead single. The mixtape continued to be delayed until Zaytoven announced in May 2018 that it was set for release later in the year.

Future announced the release of the mixtape on July 5, 2018, a day before release, via social media.

== Recording ==
In an interview with The Fader, Zaytoven stated that approximately 100 songs were recorded for Beast Mode 2 between 2016 and 2018.

== Critical reception ==
Professional ratings
Aggregate scores
Source	Rating
Metacritic	77/100
Review scores
Source	Rating
HipHopDX	3.9/5
Pitchfork	8.0/10
Rolling Stone	3/5 stars

Beast Mode 2 received generally positive reviews from music critics. At Metacritic, which assigns a normalized rating out of 100 to reviews from mainstream publications, the mixtape received an average score of 77 based on four reviews, indicating "generally favorable reviews".

Meaghan Garvey of Pitchfork wrote "...In its best moments, the unknowable rapper lays his cards on the table, vulnerable in a way he's never been before." Mosi Reeves of Rolling Stone wrote, "The Atlanta rapper's latest reminds us why he's a master of sing-rap blues even as that style begins to move beyond his massive influence." Kenan Draughorne of HipHopDX called the mixtape a "conscionable affair from start to finish" and "a reminder of Future's effortless ability to release solid tracks within his wheelhouse."

== Commercial performance ==
The mixtape debuted at number three on the Billboard 200 based on 73.5 million streams of its songs, which Billboard equated to 57,000 album-equivalent units, granting the rapper his ninth top ten and the highest-charting streaming-exclusive album in the chart.

In Canada, Beast Mode 2 debuted at number 13 on the Canadian Albums Chart, marking his first release to not debut in the top ten in the country.

== Track listing ==
All tracks are written by Nayvadius Wilburn (Future) and Xavier Dotson (Zaytoven) and produced by the latter, with "Doh Doh", containing additional writing from featured artist Kenneth Bailey (Young Scooter).

No.	Title	Length
1.	"Wifi Lit"	2:56
2.	"Cuddle My Wrist"	3:01
3.	"Racks Blue"	3:24
4.	"31 Days"	4:00
5.	"Red Light"	4:06
6.	"Doh Doh" (featuring Young Scooter)	3:40
7.	"When I Think About It"	3:04
8.	"Some More"	3:33
9.	"Hate the Real Me"	4:00
Total length:		31:44

Notes

- All track titles are stylized in all caps.

== Charts ==
=== Weekly charts ===
Chart (2018)	Peak position
Canadian Albums (Billboard)	13
Dutch Albums (Album Top 100)	49
UK Albums (Official Charts)	55
US Billboard 200	3
US Top R&B/Hip-Hop Albums (Billboard)	3

=== Year-end charts ===
Chart (2018)	Position
US Top R&B/Hip-Hop Albums (Billboard)	77
