= Beast Mode (mixtape) =

Mixtape by Future and Zaytoven
- Released: January 15, 2015
- Genres: Hip hop; trap
- Length: 27:55
- Label: Freebandz
- Producer: Zaytoven

Future chronology
Monster (2014)	Beast Mode (2015)	56 Nights (2015)

Zaytoven chronology
Drip Gang (2014)	Beast Mode (2015)	OG Zay (2015)

Singles from Beast Mode
- 1. "Real Sisters" Released: July 8, 2015

Beast Mode is the fourteenth mixtape by American rapper Future and American producer Zaytoven. It came out on January 15, 2015. Along with Monster and 56 Nights, it is considered part of "a trilogy of album-quality mixtapes" that Future released following Honest. On July 6, 2018, a sequel mixtape titled Beast Mode 2 was released.

== Background ==
Beast Mode came out two and a half months after Monster, six months after his second album Honest, and two days after Ciara released her track, called "I Bet" (which is her first song since the breakup between her and Future). According to Zaytoven, “Really, the work was done in two to three days. The rest was just picking which record we wanted to use. For somebody else to come in and see us doing the work, it would blow your mind....We might’ve gotten 40 songs done as we were putting this tape together. That’s us doing songs back-to-back. I make a beat, he raps to it… And we’d do it all over again. We might do 10 songs a day.”

"Kno The Meaning" (which was taken from DS2) is the song where Future had to elaborate on the impetus behind the project and its origin in DJ Esco's 56-day incarceration in Dubai: "People didn't even understand that my hard drives that I recorded all my music on for two years straight was on this... was on this one hard drive that Esco had and he was locked up with it, so I had to record new music. That's when I did Beast Mode." DJ Esco returned to the USA two days before the release of Beast Mode.

== Critical reception ==
Professional ratings
Aggregate scores
Source	Rating
Metacritic	81/100
Review scores
Source	Rating
Fact	(favorable)
Pitchfork	7.7/10
PopMatters	8/10

Upon release, Beast Mode was met with critical acclaim. At Metacritic, which assigns a normalized rating out of 100 to reviews from mainstream publications, the mixtape received an average score of 81 based on four reviews, indicating "universal acclaim".

David Amidon of PopMatters wrote, "Not only does the tape constantly satisfy, at nine tracks and less than a half hour it does what nearly every truly fantastic hip-hop album does: it makes its motives known and gets the hell out." Craig Jenkins of Pitchfork praised the mixtape's production and lyrics, writing, "Though he'll only tacitly admit as much, [Future] is hurt, and Beast Mode's heavy-hearted sounds assist him in sorting through it just as Monster's menace helped him turn spite to fuel. Claire Lobenfeld of Fact wrote, "[Zaytoven's] ability to bring out some of the fiercest vocals from Atlanta's finest is brought to light here," and that Future "has found [his focus] in Beast Mode – and not just because of its brevity," adding that the project "is a reminder that [Zaytoven] has a deft control over the ivories and southern-fried twinklers."

== Track listing ==
All tracks are written by Future and Zaytoven alongside the featured artist (if applicable).

No.	Title	Length
1.	"Oooooh" (featuring Young Scooter)	3:09
2.	"Lay Up"	2:47
3.	"Aintchu" (featuring Juvenile)	2:48
4.	"No Basic"	3:06
5.	"Peacoat"	3:01
6.	"Just Like Bruddas"	3:51
7.	"Where I Came From"	2:40
8.	"Real Sisters"	2:54
9.	"Forever Eva"	3:39
Total length:		27:55

Streaming / LP edition
No.	Title	Length
1.	"Oooooh" (featuring Young Scooter)	3:09
2.	"Lay Up"	2:47
3.	"Aintchu" (featuring Juvenile)	2:48
4.	"No Basic"	3:06
5.	"Peacoat"	3:01
6.	"Just Like Bruddas"	3:51
7.	"Where I Came From"	2:40
8.	"Forever Eva"	3:39
Total length:		24:58

=== Notes ===
- ''Real Sisters'' was included in the deluxe edition of DS2, Future's next studio album. To avoid having the song on multiple projects, it was removed from the tracklist of the reissue.
