= DS2 (album) =

2015 album by Future

Studio album by Future
- Released: July 17, 2015
- Studios: Chalice (Hollywood); Triangle Sounds (Atlanta)
- Genres: Hip-hop; trap
- Length: 44:22
- Labels: Freebandz; A1; Epic
- Producers: Allen Ritter; Cassius Jay; DJ Spinz; Frank Dukes; G Koop; Jake One; Metro Boomin; Sonny Digital; Southside; Zaytoven

Future chronology
56 Nights (2015)	DS2 (2015)	What a Time to Be Alive (2015)

Singles from DS2
- 1. "Fuck Up Some Commas" Released: March 2, 2015; 2. "Where Ya At" Released: July 16, 2015; 3. "Stick Talk" Released: February 1, 2016

DS2 (abbreviation of Dirty Sprite 2) is the third studio album by American rapper Future. It was released on July 17, 2015, through A1 Recordings and Freebandz, and distributed by Epic Records. The album serves as the sequel to his breakout mixtape, Dirty Sprite (2011). It features production from Metro Boomin, Southside, and Zaytoven, among others. The album was supported by three singles: "Fuck Up Some Commas", "Where Ya At", and "Stick Talk".

DS2 received generally positive reviews from critics, and was ranked as one of the best albums of 2015 and the decade by several publications. The album debuted at number one on the US Billboard 200, Future's first chart-topper, earning 151,000 units in its first week. By January 2016, the album sold 344,000 in the United States. In July 2022, the album was certified triple platinum by the Recording Industry Association of America (RIAA).

== Background ==
On July 10, 2015, Future posted the cover artwork, while announcing that his new album would be called DS2, and would be released on July 17, 2015. The track list of the album was released on July 15, 2015.

== Album artwork ==
The basis for the album's cover art is a stock photo sold through Shutterstock with the title "Color drop in water, photographed in motion. Ink swirling in water. Cloud of silky ink in water isolated on white background. Colorful ink in water, ink drop". The image was created by Sanja Tošić, an artist based in Slovenia. Although she did not know who Future was until The Fader contacted her to ask about the album art, Tošić said that she would buy a copy of his album.

== Promotion ==
The album's lead single, "Fuck Up Some Commas", was released on March 2, 2015, the music video for the song was released on March 27. It peaked at number 55 on the US Billboard Hot 100.

The album's second single, "Where Ya At" featuring Drake, was released on July 16, 2015, the song peaked at number 28 on the Billboard Hot 100.

"Stick Talk" was later sent to urban contemporary radio as the album's third single on February 1, 2016, the song peaked at number 91 on the Billboard Hot 100.

== Critical reception ==
Professional ratings
Aggregate scores
Source	Rating
AnyDecentMusic?	7.3/10
Metacritic	80/100
Review scores
Source	Rating
AllMusic	5/5 stars
Billboard	3.5/5 stars
Complex	4/5 stars
Consequence	B+
Exclaim!	8/10
Pitchfork	8.4/10
PopMatters	8/10
Rolling Stone	3.5/5 stars
Spin	8/10
Vice (Expert Witness)	A−

DS2 was met with generally positive reviews. At Metacritic, which assigns a normalized rating out of 100 to reviews from professional publications, the album received an average score of 80, based on 22 reviews. Aggregator AnyDecentMusic? gave it 7.3 out of 10, based on their assessment of the critical consensus.

AllMusic wrote that with DS2 Future solidified himself as, "a strange and yet in command figure standing at the center of a slick, inventive swirl of music". Kris Ex of Billboard stated, "Produced by a handful of trusted Atlanta trap producers, DS2 is gothic, narcotic and full of overcast skies". Complex wrote of the album, "If you've followed Future's recent moves, DS2 is not unprecedented, but it greatly enhances the brooding ambiance of his recent work, a dive further into the abyss". Brian Josephs of Consequence stated, "DS2 is his strongest campaign yet, and it's the first time a new Future album has met all expectations". Calum Slingerland of Exclaim! wrote that "the majority of these beats hit to hurt, and though the emotional Future that listeners have come to know through past cuts 'Throw Away' and 'My Savages' has been dialed back, the honesty and vulnerability come through when it counts". Sheldon Pearce of HipHopDX stated, "Dirty Sprite 2 doesn't survey any new territory for the croaking crooner, but it magnifies the depth of his distress and channels it into an even richer multilayered sonic experience".

Chris Kelly of Fact said, "DS2 is a relentless, dud-free hour that adds in most of his recent highlights to complete the story of his last year". Reviewing the album's deluxe edition for Vice, Robert Christgau deemed DS2 a "miserable minor masterpiece" that is "all the proof we needed that money can't buy happiness". Brian Duricy of PopMatters said, "Self-mythologizing aside, the music on DS2 is worthy of the praise lauded on Future". Meaghan Garvey of Pitchfork stated, "Future was always straightforward, never ashamed to confess his depression or infatuation, but the narratives never felt so focused, nuanced, or vulnerable than here". Christopher R. Weingarten of Rolling Stone stated, "It has little of the far-reaching ambition of Honest, but what it lacks in bold stroke, it more than makes up for in consistency". Drew Millard of Spin stated, "Dirty Sprite 2 is a tremendous compendium of everything you want from a Future album in 2015". Vish Khanna of Now said, "In lieu of artistry or any semblance of lyrical spark, DS2 offers monotonous production and relentless chanting".

=== Rankings ===
Select rankings of DS2
Publication	List	Rank	Ref.
The A.V. Club	50 Favorite Albums of the 2010s	18	
Billboard	100 Best Albums of the 2010s	40	
Complex	Best Albums of 2015	2	
Fact	The 50 Best Albums of 2015	6	
NME	Albums of the Year 2015	37	
Noisey	The 50 Best Albums of 2015	2	
Noisey	The 100 Best Albums of the 2010s	9	
Pitchfork	The 50 Best Albums of 2015	19	
Pitchfork	The 200 Best Albums of the 2010s	65	
Rolling Stone	50 Best Albums of 2015	26	
Rolling Stone	The 200 Greatest Hip-Hop Albums of All Time	20	
Rolling Stone	The 250 Greatest Albums of the 21st Century So Far	89	
Stereogum	The 50 Best Albums of 2015	18	
The Wire	Releases of the Year 1–50	19	

== Commercial performance ==
DS2 debuted at number one on the US Billboard 200 with 151,000 album-equivalent units; it sold 126,000 copies in its first week. By January 2016, the album sold 344,000 copies domestically. On July 27, 2022, the album was certified triple platinum by the Recording Industry Association of America (RIAA) for combined sales, streaming and track-sale equivalents of three million units.

== Track listing ==
DS2 track listing
No.	Title	Writer(s)	Producer(s)	Length
1.	"Thought It Was a Drought"	Nayvadius Wilburn; Leland Wayne; Allen Ritter	Metro Boomin; Ritter	4:24
2.	"I Serve the Base"	Wilburn; Wayne	Metro Boomin	3:09
3.	"Where Ya At" (featuring Drake)	Wilburn; Aubrey Graham; Wayne	Metro Boomin	3:27
4.	"Groupies"	Wilburn; Wayne; Sonny Uwaezuoke; Joshua Luellen	Metro Boomin; Sonny Digital; Southside	3:06
5.	"Lil One"	Wilburn; Wayne; Luellen	Metro Boomin; Southside	3:27
6.	"Stick Talk"	Wilburn; Luellen; Sasja Vanderveken	Southside	2:51
7.	"Freak Hoe"	Wilburn; Wayne	Metro Boomin	2:54
8.	"Rotation"	Wilburn; Wayne; Luellen	Metro Boomin; Southside	2:47
9.	"Slave Master"	Wilburn; Wayne; Luellen	Metro Boomin; Southside	3:18
10.	"Blow a Bag"	Wilburn; Wayne; Uwaezuoke; Luellen	Metro Boomin; Sonny Digital; Southside	3:14
11.	"Colossal"	Wilburn; Xavier Dotson	Zaytoven	3:03
12.	"Rich Sex"	Wilburn; Wayne; Luellen; Adam Feeney	Metro Boomin; Southside; Frank Dukes	4:00
13.	"Blood on the Money"	Wilburn; Wayne; Dotson; Joshua Cross	Metro Boomin; Zaytoven; Cassius Jay	4:42
Total length:				44:22

Deluxe edition (bonus tracks)
No.	Title	Writer(s)	Producer(s)	Length
14.	"Trap Niggas"	Wilburn; Luellen	Southside	3:04
15.	"The Percocet & Stripper Joint"	Wilburn; Luellen; Jacob Dutton; Robert Mandell	Southside; Jake One; G Koop	2:28
16.	"Real Sisters"	Wilburn; Dotson	Zaytoven	2:54
17.	"Kno the Meaning"	Wilburn; Luellen	Southside	3:45
18.	"Fuck Up Some Commas"	Wilburn; Luellen; Gary Hill	Southside; DJ Spinz	3:57
Total length:				60:30

Spotify deluxe edition (bonus track)
No.	Title	Length
19.	"Like I Never Left" (documentary audio; featuring Diddy, Ludacris, Pharrell Williams, Pusha T and Casino)	25:49
Total length:		86:19

Note

- "Rich Sex" is stylized as "Rich $ex".

== Personnel ==
Credits adapted from the album's liner notes and Tidal.

- Glenn Schick – mastering engineer
- Eric Manco – mixing engineer (all tracks), recording engineer (3–5, 7, 9, 13, 15), engineer (17)
- Seth Firkins – mixing engineer (all tracks), recording engineer (1, 2, 6, 8, 10–12, 14, 16–18), engineer (7)
- Ryan Coplan – assistant mixing engineer (all tracks)
- Jeremy D. Brown – mixing engineer (15), assistant engineer (all tracks), miscellaneous producer (all tracks)
- Niles Roberts – assistant engineer
- Tyler Kumpee – assistant engineer

== Charts ==
=== Weekly charts ===
Chart performance for DS2
Chart (2015)	Peak position
Belgian Albums (Ultratop Flanders)	98
Canadian Albums (Billboard)	5
Dutch Albums (Album Top 100)	95
French Albums (SNEP)	161
Swiss Albums (Schweizer Hitparade)	85
UK Albums (Official Charts)	56
US Billboard 200	1
US Top R&B/Hip-Hop Albums (Billboard)	1

=== Year-end charts ===
2015 year-end chart performance for DS2
Chart (2015)	Position
US Billboard 200	42
US Top R&B/Hip-Hop Albums (Billboard)	11

2016 year-end chart performance for DS2
Chart (2016)	Position
US Billboard 200	28
US Top R&B/Hip-Hop Albums (Billboard)	20

2017 year-end chart performance for DS2
Chart (2017)	Position
US Billboard 200	97
US Top R&B/Hip-Hop Albums (Billboard)	66

2021 year-end chart performance for DS2
Chart (2021)	Position
US Billboard 200	182

2022 year-end chart performance for DS2
Chart (2022)	Position
US Billboard 200	159

2024 year-end chart performance for DS2
Chart (2024)	Position
US Billboard 200	118
US Top R&B/Hip-Hop Albums (Billboard)	67

=== Decade-end charts ===
Decade-end chart performance for DS2
Chart (2010–2019)	Position
US Billboard 200	139

== Certifications ==
Certifications and sales for DS2
Region	Certification	Certified units/sales
Canada (Music Canada)	Platinum	80,000^{‡}
Denmark (IFPI Danmark)	Gold	10,000^{‡}
United Kingdom (BPI)	Silver	60,000^{‡}
United States (RIAA)	3× Platinum	3,000,000^{‡}
^{‡} Sales+streaming figures based on certification alone.
