= Billboard Year-End Hot R&B/Hip-Hop Songs of 2022 =

American music chart

This is a list of Billboard magazine's Top Hot R&B/Hip-Hop Songs of 2022.

No.	Title	Artist(s)
1	"First Class"	Jack Harlow
2	"Wait for U"	Future featuring Drake and Tems
3	"Big Energy"	Latto
4	"About Damn Time"	Lizzo
5	"Super Gremlin"	Kodak Black
6	"Industry Baby"	Lil Nas X featuring Jack Harlow
7	"Bad Habit"	Steve Lacy
8	"Jimmy Cooks"	Drake featuring 21 Savage
9	"Woman"	Doja Cat
10	"Break My Soul"	Beyoncé
11	"Smokin out the Window"	Silk Sonic
12	"I Hate U"	SZA
13	"pushin P"	Gunna and Future featuring Young Thug
14	"In a Minute"	Lil Baby
15	"Super Freaky Girl"	Nicki Minaj
16	"Hrs and Hrs"	Muni Long
17	"Knife Talk"	Drake featuring 21 Savage and Project Pat
18	"Broadway Girls"	Lil Durk featuring Morgan Wallen
19	"Puffin on Zootiez"	Future
20	"To the Moon!"	Jnr Choi and Sam Tompkins
21	"Way 2 Sexy"	Drake featuring Future and Young Thug
22	"What Happened to Virgil"	Lil Durk featuring Gunna
23	"Sleazy Flow"	SleazyWorld Go featuring Lil Baby
24	"Girls Want Girls"	Drake featuring Lil Baby
25	"Cooped Up"	Post Malone featuring Roddy Ricch
26	"Sticky"	Drake
27	"Free Mind"	Tems
28	"Who Want Smoke?"	Nardo Wick featuring G Herbo, Lil Durk and 21 Savage
29	"F.N.F. (Let's Go)"	Hitkidd and GloRilla
30	"Do We Have a Problem?"	Nicki Minaj and Lil Baby
31	"No Love"	Summer Walker and SZA
32	"Right On"	Lil Baby
33	"Staying Alive"	DJ Khaled featuring Drake and Lil Baby
34	"Peru"	Fireboy DML and Ed Sheeran
35	"Essence"	Wizkid featuring Tems and Justin Bieber
36	"You Right"	Doja Cat and The Weeknd
37	"Freaky Deaky"	Tyga and Doja Cat
38	"By Your Side"	Rod Wave
39	"Ahhh Ha"	Lil Durk
40	"Cuff It"	Beyoncé
41	"Me or Sum"	Nardo Wick featuring Lil Baby and Future
42	"Hotel Lobby (Unc & Phew)"	Unc & Phew (Quavo and Takeoff)
43	"Get Into It (Yuh)"	Doja Cat
44	"Pressure"	Ari Lennox
45	"Nail Tech"	Jack Harlow
46	"Under the Influence"	Chris Brown
47	"Hot Shit"	Cardi B featuring Kanye West and Lil Durk
48	"Die Hard"	Kendrick Lamar, Blxst, and Amanda Reifer
49	"Die for You"	The Weeknd
50	"Sacrifice"	The Weeknd
51	"Silent Hill"	Kendrick Lamar and Kodak Black
52	"Banking on Me"	Gunna
53	"P Power"	Gunna featuring Drake
54	"Have Mercy"	Chlöe
55	"N95"	Kendrick Lamar
56	"Handsomer"	Russ
57	"For Tonight"	Giveon
58	"Scorpio"	Moneybagg Yo
59	"Plan B"	Megan Thee Stallion
60	"All Mine"	Brent Faiyaz
61	"Hate Our Love"	Queen Naija and Big Sean
62	"Too Easy"	Gunna and Future
63	"City of Gods"	Fivio Foreign, Kanye West, and Alicia Keys
64	"Love You Better"	Future
65	"Out of Time"	The Weeknd
66	"Tomorrow 2"	GloRilla and Cardi B
67	"Rumors"	Gucci Mane featuring Lil Durk
68	"Dah Dah DahDah"	Nardo Wick
69	"Beautiful Lies"	Yung Bleu and Kehlani
70	"DFMU"	Ella Mai
71	"Wild Side"	Normani featuring Cardi B
72	"Chosen"	Blxst and Tyga featuring Ty Dolla Sign
73	"Good Love"	City Girls featuring Usher
74	"Cash In Cash Out"	Pharrell Williams featuring 21 Savage and Tyler, the Creator
75	"Bad Man (Smooth Criminal)"	Polo G
76	"Bubbly"	Young Thug, Drake and Travis Scott
77	"See Wat I'm Sayin"	Moneybagg Yo
78	"Billie Eilish"	Armani White
79	"Family Ties"	Baby Keem and Kendrick Lamar
80	"I'm on One"	Future featuring Drake
81	"Already Dead"	Juice Wrld
82	"Alone"	Rod Wave
83	"Alien Superstar"	Beyoncé
84	"Fair Trade"	Drake featuring Travis Scott
85	"Gotta Move On"	Diddy featuring Bryson Tiller
86	"Megan's Piano"	Megan Thee Stallion
87	"Money So Big"	Yeat
88	"Poke It Out"	Wale featuring J. Cole
89	"Static"	Steve Lacy
90	"Don't Play That"	King Von and 21 Savage
91	"True Love"	Kanye West and XXXTentacion
92	"Worst Day"	Future
93	"712PM"	Future
94	"Iffy"	Chris Brown
95	"Sharing Locations"	Meek Mill featuring Lil Baby and Lil Durk
96	"Scared Money"	YG featuring J. Cole and Moneybagg Yo
97	"Freestyle"	Lil Baby
98	"Ex for a Reason"	Summer Walker and JT
99	"Over"	Lucky Daye
100	"Vette Motors"	YoungBoy Never Broke Again

== See also ==
- 2022 in music
- Billboard Year-End Hot 100 singles of 2022
- Billboard Year-End Hot Rap Songs of 2022
- List of number-one R&B/hip-hop songs of 2022 (U.S.)
