= Future videography =

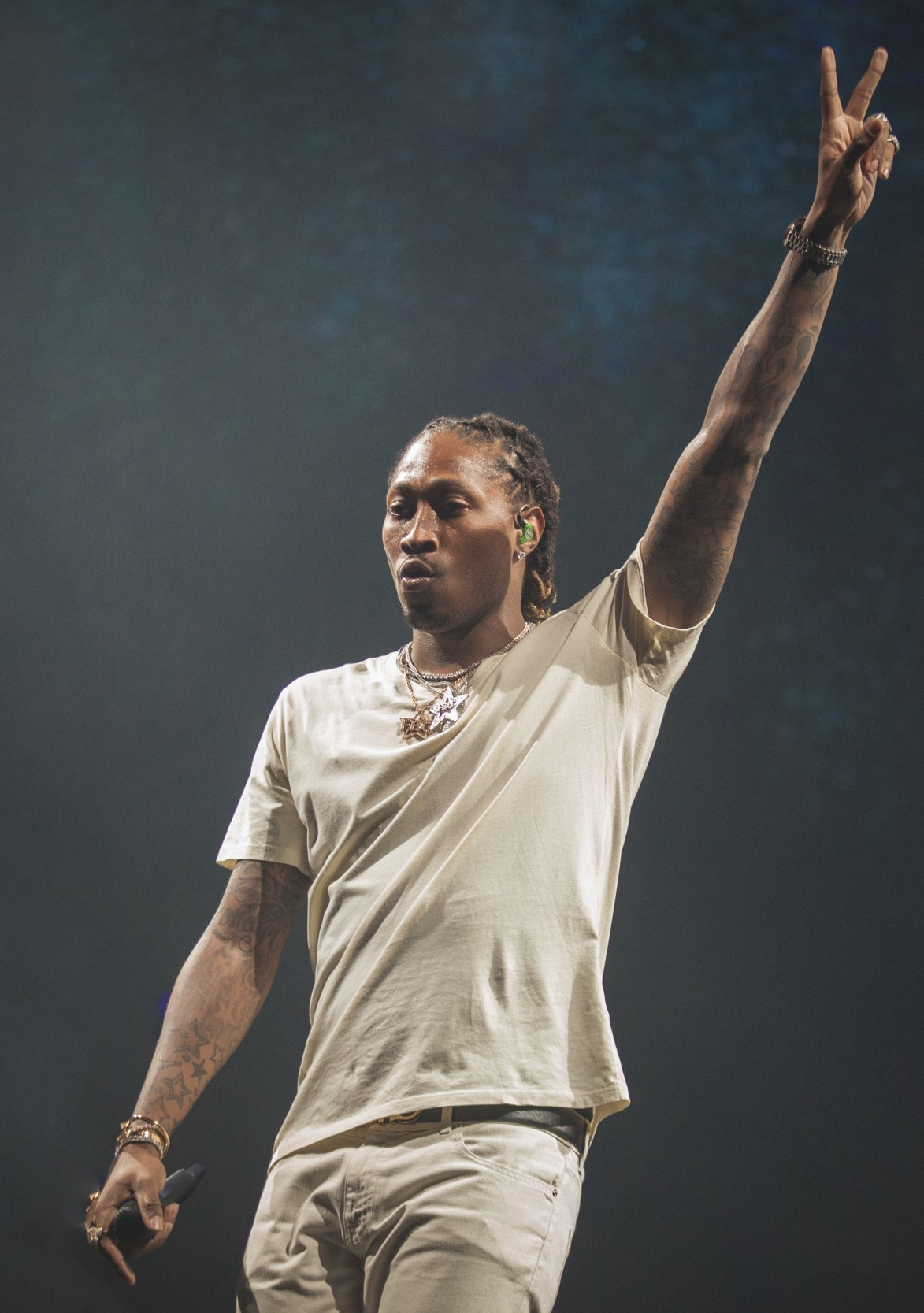
- Future performing during the Summer Sixteen Tour in 2016
- Music videos: 102 (as a lead artist); 25 (as a featured artist)

American rapper Future has appeared in numerous music videos—as a lead artist, a featured artist, and cameo appearances. His first song to have an official music video was his first single "Tony Montana". Future subsequently starred in the music videos for songs such as "Honest", "Shit", "Move That Dope", "I Won", "Fuck Up Some Commas", "Where Ya At", "Low Life", "Used to This", "Mask Off", "You Da Baddest", "Jumpin on a Jet", "Life Is Good" and "Type Shit".

== Music videos ==
=== As lead artist ===
Year	Title	Director	Other performer(s) credited	Album	Ref.
2011	"Tony Montana"	Jessy Terrero	Future	Pluto	
2011	"No Matter What"	Decatur Dan	Future	Astronaut Status	
2011	"Much More"	Propane	Future	Dirty Sprite	
2011	"Long Time Coming"	Nokey	Future	Pluto	
2012	"Magic"	Decatur Dan	Future featuring T.I.	Pluto	
2012	"Space Cadet"	NoKey Films	Future	Astronaut Status	
2012	"Same Damn Time"	Dr. Teeth	Future	Pluto	
2012	"Same Damn Time" (Remix)	Alex Nazari	Future featuring Diddy and Ludacris	Pluto	
2012	"Turn on the Lights"	Bryan Barber	Future	Pluto	
2012	"Straight Up"	Decatur Dan	Future	Pluto	
2012	"Neva End" (Remix)	Eric White	Future featuring Kelly Rowland	Pluto 3D	
2013	"Long Live the Pimp"	Trae tha Truth	Future featuring Trae tha Truth	Pluto 3D	
2013	"Homicide" (Live)	N/A	Future featuring Snoop Lion	Pluto 3D	
2013	"My"	Cricket	Future	Honest	
2013	"Honest"	Colin Tilley	Future	Honest	
2013	"Shit"	Alex Nazari	Future	Honest (Deluxe Edition)	
2013	"Real and True"	Rankin	Future and Miley Cyrus featuring Mr. Hudson	—N/a	
2014	"Move That Dope"	Benny Boom	Future featuring Pharrell, Pusha T, and Casino	Honest	
2014	"Covered N Money"	N/A	Future	Honest	
2014	"I Won"	Hype Williams	Future featuring Kanye West	Honest	
2014	"Blood, Sweat, Tears"	Samantha Lecca	Future	Honest	
2014	"T-Shirt"	Cricket	Future	Honest	
2014	"Monster"	Samantha Lecca	Future	Monster	
2014	"Hardly"	Self-directed	Future	Monster	
2015	"Radical"	Self-directed	Future	Monster	
2015	"My Savages"	Cricket	Future	Monster	
2015	"Fuck Up Some Commas"	Motion Family	Future	DS2 and Monster	
2015	"Real Sisters"	Spike Jordan	Future	DS2	
2015	"Trap Niggas"	Propane	Future	DS2	
2015	"Where I Came From"	Shootrr	Future	Beast Mode	
2015	"Blow a Bag"	Rick Nyce	Future	DS2	
2015	"Kno the Meaning"	Vincent Lou° Film	Future	DS2	
2015	"Where Ya At"	Samantha Lecca	Future featuring Drake	DS2	
2015	"Blood on the Money"	Rite Brothers	Future	DS2	
2015	"The Percocet & Stripper Joint"	Vincent Lou° Film	Future	DS2	
2015	"Stick Talk"	Eif Riveira	Future	DS2	
2015	"Colossal"	Rick Nyce	Future	DS2	
2015	"Rich $ex"	Eif Riveira	Future	DS2	
2016	"Low Life"	Zac Facts	Future featuring The Weeknd	Evol	
2016	"Wicked"	Grant Singer	Future featuring DJ Esco	Evol	
2016	"Used to This"	Eif Rivera	Future featuring Drake		
2016	"Buy Love"	Aaron Klisman	Future		
2016	"That's a Check"	Eif Rivera	Future featuring Rick Ross		
2017	"Purple Reign"	The Shooter	Future	Purple Reign	
2017	"Poppin' Tags"	Vincent Lou° Film	Future	Future	
2017	"Super Trapper"	Sam Lecca	Future	Future	
2017	"Draco"	Rite Brothers	Future	Future	
2017	"Use Me"	Nick Walker and Daniel Pappas	Future	Hndrxx	
2017	"Mask Off"	Colin Tilley	Future	Future	
2017	"Pie"	Nick Walker	Future featuring Chris Brown	Hndrxx	
2017	"Extra Luv"	Benny Boom	Future featuring YG	Future	
2017	"Right Now"	The Shooter	Future		
2017	"My Collection"	Nick Walker	Future		
2017	"You Da Baddest"	Benny Boom	Future featuring Nicki Minaj	Hndrxx	
2018	"Feds Did a Sweep"	Self-directed	Future	Future	
2018	"Absolutely Going Brazy"	Self-directed	Future		
2018	"No Shame"	Director X	Future featuring PartyNextDoor	Superfly	
2018	"WiFi Lit" (Stylized in ALL CAPS)	Spike Jordan	Future	Beast Mode 2	
2018	"31 Days"	Spike Jordan	Future	Beast Mode 2	
2019	"Crushed Up"	Spike Jordan and Sebastian Sdaigui	Future	The Wizrd	
2019	"Jumpin on a Jet"	Colin Tilley	Future	The Wizrd	
2019	"Rocket Ship"	Uncle Leff	Future	The Wizrd	
2019	"Never Stop"	Uncle Leff	Future	The Wizrd	
2019	"Goin Dummi"	Spike Jordan	Future	The Wizrd	
2019	"F&N"	Colin Tilley	Future	The Wizrd	
2019	"XanaX Damage"	Henri Alexander Levy	Future	Save Me	
2019	"Love Thy Enemies"	Henri Alexander Levy	Future	Save Me	
2019	"Government Official"	Henri Alexander Levy	Future	Save Me	
2019	"St. Lucia"	Henri Alexander Levy	Future	Save Me	
2019	"Please Tell Me"	Henri Alexander Levy	Future	Save Me	
2019	"100 Shooters"	Gigi Ben Artzi & Roy Ben Artzi	Future featuring Meek Mill and Doe Boy	High Off Life	
2019	"Last Name"	Marko Steez	Future featuring Lil Durk	High Off Life	
2020	"Life Is Good"	Director X	Future featuring Drake	High Off Life	
2020	"Tycoon"	Eif Rivera	Future	High Off Life	
2020	"Hard To Choose One"	Rambino	Future	High Off Life	
2020	"Ridin Strikers"	Eif Rivera	Future	High Off Life	
2020	"Posted with Demons"	DAPS	Future	High Off Life	
2021	"Hard for the Next"	Daniel Russell	Moneybagg Yo and Future	A Gangsta's Pain	
2021	"Nobody Special"	DrewFilmedit and Jon J. Visuals	Hotboii and Future	N/A	
2022	"Too Easy" (Remix)	N/A	Gunna and Future featuring Roddy Ricch	DS4Ever	
2022	"Worst Day"	DAPS	Future	I Never Liked You	
2022	"Keep It Burnin"	Rick Nyce	Future featuring Kanye West	I Never Liked You	
2022	"Wait For U"	Director X	Future featuring Drake and Tems	I Never Liked You	
2022	"Puffin On Zootiez"	Nick Walker	Future	I Never Liked You	
2022	"Holy Ghost"	Jeff Videoz	Future	I Never Liked You	
2022	"Love You Better"	N/A	Future	I Never Liked You	
2022	"I'm Dat Nigga" (Stylized as "I'm Dat N****")	Leff	Future	I Never Liked You	
2022	"Massaging Me"	Cacy Goat	Future	I Never Liked You	
2022	"712PM"	Travis Scott	Future	I Never Liked You	
2022	"Superhero (Heroes & Villains)"	N/A	Metro Boomin, Future, and Chris Brown (Note: Chris Brown does not appear in the songs music video, although his verse is still present.)	Heroes & Villains	
2023	"Back to the Basics"	Skeeboe	Future	I Never Liked You	
2024	"Type Shit"		Future, Metro Boomin, Travis Scott, and Playboi Carti	We Don't Trust You	
2024	"Young Metro"		Future, Metro Boomin, and The Weeknd	We Don't Trust You	
2024	"We Still Don't Trust You"		Future, Metro Boomin, and The Weeknd	We Still Don't Trust You	
2024	"Drink N Dance"		Future and Metro Boomin	We Still Don't Trust You	
2024	"Streets Made Me a King"		Future and Metro Boomin	We Still Don't Trust You	
2024	"Too Fast"		Future	Mixtape Pluto	
2024	"Teflon Don"		Future	Mixtape Pluto	
2024	"Told My"		Future	Mixtape Pluto	
2024	"Ski"		Future	Mixtape Pluto	
2024	"Brazzier"		Future	Mixtape Pluto	

=== As featured artist ===
Year	Title	Director	Artist(s)	Album
2011	"Racks"	R. Malcolm Jones	YC featuring Future	
2012	"How Bout That"	Gabriel Hart	B.o.B featuring Future and Trae	
2012	"Ain't No Way Around It" (Remix)	G. Visuals	DJ Drama featuring Future, Big Boi and Young Jeezy	
2012	"Ring Ring"	Dre Films	Rick Ross featuring Future	
2012	"We in This Bitch"	Benny Boom	DJ Drama featuring Future, Young Jeezy, T.I. and Ludacris	
2012	"Way Too Gone"	Taj	Young Jeezy featuring Future	
2012	"I Remember"	Motion Family	Game featuring Future and Young Jeezy	
2012	"I Got That Paper"	Rob Dade	Rob Zoe featuring Future	
2012	"Fuck the World"	Gabriel Hart	Gucci Mane featuring Future	
2012	"Bitches & Bottles (Let's Get It Started)"	Gil Green	DJ Khaled featuring Future, Lil Wayne, T.I. and Ace Hood	
2013	"Nobody Knows"	Prime Cut	Juelz Santana featuring Future	
2013	"Bugatti"	Gil Green	Ace Hood featuring Future and Rick Ross	
2013	"Love Me"	Hannah Lux	Lil Wayne featuring Future and Drake	
2013	"Show You"	Colin Tilley	Tyga featuring Future	
2013	"I Wanna Be with You"	Colin Tilley	DJ Khaled featuring Future, Rick Ross and Nicki Minaj	
2015	"Crystal"	Nicolas Noel	Kaaris featuring Future	
2017	"My Brothers"	N/A	Ralo featuring Future	
2017	"Everyday"	Chris Marrs Piliero	Ariana Grande featuring Future	
2017	"Cold"	Rich Lee	Maroon 5 featuring Future	
2017	"Frozen Water"	Rollo Jackson	Belly featuring Future	
2018	"End Game"	Joseph Kahn	Taylor Swift featuring Ed Sheeran and Future	
2018	"King's Dead"	Dave Free and Jack Begert	Jay Rock featuring Kendrick Lamar, Future and James Blake	
2018	"Top Off"	Jay-Z	DJ Khaled featuring Jay-Z, Future, and Beyoncé	
2019	"No Cryin"	N/A	Dvsn featuring Future	
2021	"Number 2"	Troy Roscoe and Nayip Ramos	KSI featuring Future and 21 Savage	
2025	"99"	Carters Vision	Lil Baby featuring Future	

== Filmography ==
Film
Year	Film	Role	Ref.
2016	The Art of Organized Noise	Himself	
2021	The KSI Show	Himself	

Television
Title	Role	Notes	Ref.
The Late Show with Stephen Colbert	Live performer (as self)	Episode from The Late Show with Stephen Colbert from 2019	
2023 MTV Video Music Awards	Live performer (as self)	Television Special, part of series	
The 65th Annual Grammy Awards	Live performer (as self)	Television Special	

Documentaries
Year	Title	Ref.
2019	The Wizrd (Future Documentary)	

Concert films
Year	Film	Role	Notes
