= ATL Jacob production discography =

The following list is a discography of production by ATL Jacob, an American hip hop record producer from Atlanta, Georgia. It includes a list of songs produced, co-produced and remixed by year, artist, album and title. He has produced multiple singles certified gold or higher by the Recording Industry Association of America (RIAA), including a US Billboard number one hit single.

== Singles produced ==
List of singles produced, with selected chart positions and certifications, showing year released and album name
Title	Year	Peak chart positions								Certifications	Album
Title	Year	US	US R&B/HH	US Rhy.	AUS	CAN	ZA	NZ Hot.	UK	Certifications	Album
"First Off" (Future featuring Travis Scott)	2019	47	24	33	—	39	—	14	78	MC: Platinum; RIAA: Platinum	The Wizrd
"Keep It Burnin" (Future featuring Kanye West)	2022	15	10	—	—	33	13	—	—		I Never Liked You
"Love You Better" (Future)	2022	12	8	22	—	46	10	—	100	RIAA: Platinum	I Never Liked You
"Wait for U" (Future featuring Drake and Tems)	2022	1	1	1	12	3	1		8	AFP: Gold; ARIA: 2× Platinum; BPI: 2× Platinum; FIMI: Gold; IFPI AUS: Gold; IFPI DEN: Platinum; MC: 2× Platinum; Promusicae: Gold; RIAA: 3× Platinum; RMNZ: 3× Platinum; SNEP: Gold; ZPAV: Gold	I Never Liked You
"Right On" (Lil Baby)	2022	13	5	—	—	28	73	10	78	RIAA: Platinum	Non-album singles
"Super Gremlin" (Kodak Black)	2022	3	1	2	—	24	—	—	—	BPI: Silver; MC: Platinum; RIAA: Platinum; RMNZ: Gold	Non-album singles
"FTCU" (Nicki Minaj)	2023	15	6	1	58	23	—	23	40	RIAA: Platinum; RMNZ: Gold	Pink Friday 2
"Last Time I Saw You" (Nicki Minaj)	2023	23	6	16	— (Note: "Last Time I Saw You" did not enter the Australian Singles Chart, but peaked at 33 on the Hip Hop/R&B singles chart.)	35	—	3	46		Pink Friday 2
"Fxck Up the World" (Lisa featuring Future)	2025	—	36	—	—	85	—	4	96		Alter Ego
"Bruce Wayne" (Be First & Flo Milli)	2026	—	—	—	—	—	—	—	—		Watch Me

== Other production ==
Artist(s)	Year	Album	Songs
Juice Wrld, Future	2018	Wrld on Drugs	15. "Transformer" (performed by Future featuring Nicki Minaj)
Future	2019	The Wizrd	01. "Never Stop"; 03. "Rocket Ship"; 06. "F&N"; 08. "Talk Shit Like a Preacher"; 10. "Stick to the Models"; 15. "Unicorn Purp" (featuring Young Thug and Gunna); 17. "First Off" (featuring Travis Scott)
Nav	2019	Bad Habits	08. "Tussin" (featuring Young Thug)
Roddy Ricch	2019	Please Excuse Me for Being Antisocial	01. "Intro"
Young Thug	2019	So Much Fun	02. "Sup Mate" (featuring Future)
Juice Wrld	2020	Non–album singles	00. "Fire In My Lungs"
Lil Yachty	2020	Lil Boat 3	Deluxe edition (bonus tracks): Lil Boat 3.5: 21. "Flex Up" (with Future and Playboi Carti)
Guap Tarantino	2022	Euphoria	02. "100 Round Choppers" (featuring Lil Uzi Vert)
Future	2022	I Never Liked You	03. "Keep It Burnin" (featuring Kanye West); 04. "For a Nut" (featuring Gunna and Young Thug); 07. "Wait for U" (featuring Drake and Tems); 08. "Love You Better"; 09. "Massaging Me"; 11. "We Jus Wanna Get High"; 13. "Holy Ghost"; Deluxe edition (bonus tracks): 17. "No Security" (featuring Babyface Ray); 20. "Stayed Down" (featuring Young Scooter)
Kanye West	2022	Donda 2	07. "Pablo"; 17. "Louie Bags"
Kevin Gates	2022	Non–album singles	00. "Super General Freestyle"
Nicki Minaj	2023	Pink Friday 2	03. "FTCU"; 05. "Fallin 4 U"; 06. "Let Me Calm Down" (featuring J. Cole); 21. "Last Time I Saw You"; Pink Friday 2 Gag City digital Pluto edition bonus track: 25. "Press Play" (featuring Future)
¥$	2024	Vultures 2	08. "Dead"
Alabama Barker	2025	Non–album singles	00. "Cry Bhabie"
Future	2026	The Real Me	01. "Fukk a Interview"; 07. "Konnichiwa"; 08. "Trench Coat"; 13. "Money over Everything"; 20. "Feeling I Give"
