= Billboard Year-End Hot Rap Songs of 2022 =

American music chart

This is a list of Billboard magazine's Top Hot Rap Songs of 2022.

No.	Title	Artist(s)
1	"First Class"	Jack Harlow
2	"Wait for U"	Future featuring Drake and Tems
3	"Big Energy"	Latto
4	"Super Gremlin"	Kodak Black
5	"Industry Baby"	Lil Nas X featuring Jack Harlow
6	"Jimmy Cooks"	Drake featuring 21 Savage
7	"Vegas"	Doja Cat
8	"In a Minute"	Lil Baby
9	"Pushin P"	Gunna and Future featuring Young Thug
10	"Sweetest Pie"	Megan Thee Stallion and Dua Lipa
11	"Super Freaky Girl"	Nicki Minaj
12	"Knife Talk"	Drake featuring 21 Savage and Project Pat
13	"Way 2 Sexy"	Drake featuring Future and Young Thug
14	"Broadway Girls"	Lil Durk featuring Morgan Wallen
15	"What Happened to Virgil"	Lil Durk featuring Gunna
16	"Puffin on Zootiez"	Future
17	"Girls Want Girls"	Drake featuring Lil Baby
18	"To the Moon"	Jnr Choi and Sam Tompkins
19	"Sticky"	Drake
20	"Who Want Smoke?"	Nardo Wick featuring G Herbo, Lil Durk and 21 Savage
21	"Betty (Get Money)"	Yung Gravy
22	"Cooped Up"	Post Malone featuring Roddy Ricch
23	"F.N.F. (Let's Go)"	Hitkidd and GloRilla
24	"Staying Alive"	DJ Khaled featuring Drake and Lil Baby
25	"Sleazy Flow"	SleazyWorld Go
26	"Right On"	Lil Baby
27	"Get Into It (Yuh)"	Doja Cat
28	"By Your Side"	Rod Wave
29	"Do We Have a Problem?"	Nicki Minaj and Lil Baby
30	"Hot Shit"	Cardi B featuring Kanye West, and Lil Durk
31	"Silent Hill"	Kendrick Lamar and Kodak Black
32	"Freaky Deaky"	Tyga and Doja Cat
33	"Me or Sum"	Nardo Wick featuring Lil Baby and Future
34	"Ahhh Ha"	Lil Durk
35	"P Power"	Gunna featuring Drake
36	"Nail Tech"	Jack Harlow
37	"Scorpio"	Moneybagg Yo
38	"Tomorrow 2"	GloRilla and Cardi B
39	"Hotel Lobby"	Unc & Phew
40	"Too Easy"	Gunna and Future
41	"N95"	Kendrick Lamar
42	"Rumors"	Gucci Mane featuring Lil Durk
43	"Chosen"	Blxst featuring Tyga and Ty Dolla Sign
44	"Dah Dah DahDah"	Nardo Wick
45	"Handsomer"	Russ
46	"Already Dead"	Juice Wrld
47	"Family Ties"	Baby Keem and Kendrick Lamar
48	"Alone"	Rod Wave
49	"Plan B"	Megan Thee Stallion
50	"Billie Eilish"	Armani White

== See also ==
- 2022 in music
- Billboard Year-End Hot 100 singles of 2022
- Billboard Year-End Hot R&B/Hip-Hop Songs of 2022
