= Billboard Year-End Hot 100 singles of 2022 =

Ranking of recorded music

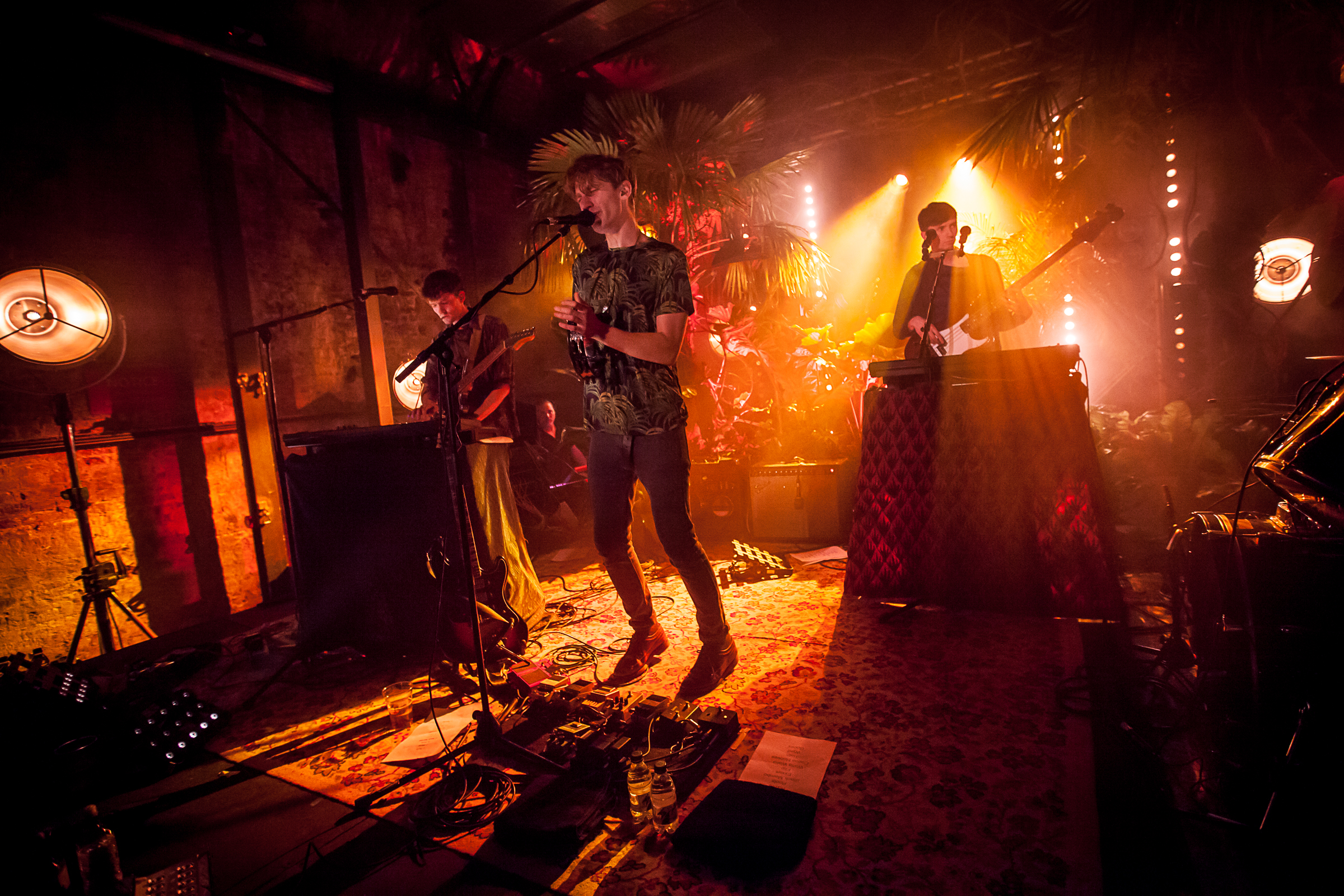
"Heat Waves" by Glass Animals (pictured) was the best-performing single of 2022; in addition, it was #16 on the 2021 Year-End List. It spent five weeks at number one on the weekly chart in 2022, and spent 91 weeks on the chart overall, becoming the longest-charting song in the Hot 100's 64-year history.

The Billboard Hot 100 is a chart that ranks the best-performing singles of the United States. Its data, published by Billboard magazine and compiled by Nielsen SoundScan, is based collectively on each single's weekly physical and digital sales, as well as airplay and streaming. At the end of a year, Billboard will publish an annual list of the 100 most successful songs throughout that year on the Hot 100 chart based on the information. For 2022, the list was published on December 1, calculated with data from November 20, 2021 to November 12, 2022. At the number-one position was Glass Animals' "Heat Waves", which spent 5 weeks on top of the Billboard Hot 100. It accumulated a total of 91 weeks on the chart, which is the longest-charting song in the 64-year history of the Billboard Hot 100.

The 2022 Billboard Hot 100 Year-End list is also notable for being one of five Billboard Year-End lists that featured 14 songs that appeared in the previous year (in this case 2021's) repeat onto this list. With the highest being the number one song of the year, Glass Animals' "Heat Waves", which first appeared onto 2021's list at number 16. Only four more year-end list would repeat the same feat, that being 1997, 2010, 2016 and 2018.

== Year-end list ==
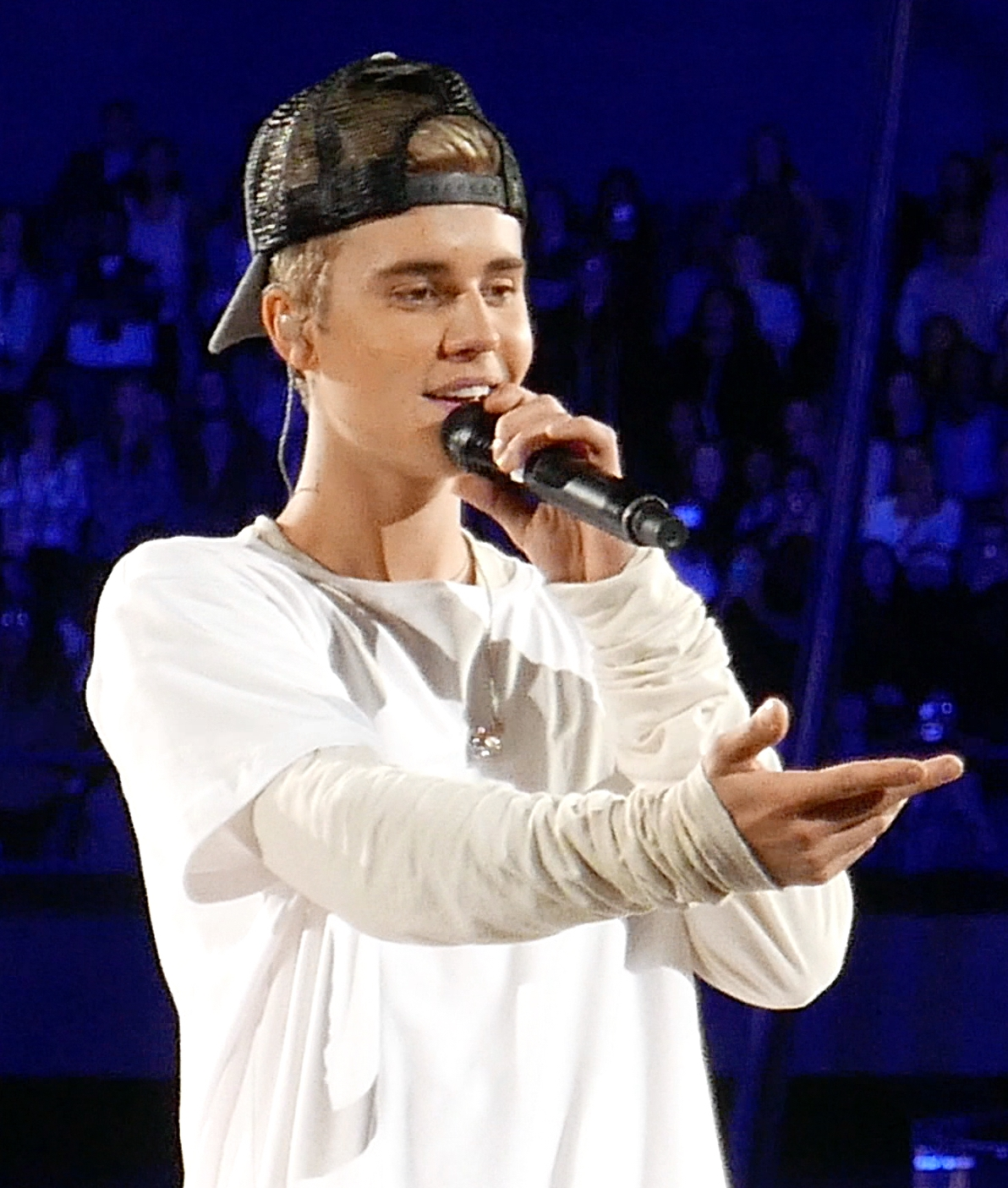
Three songs from Justin Bieber appear on the list, with "Stay" (with the Kid Laroi) at number 3, "Ghost" at number 8, and "Essence" (with Wizkid and Tems) at number 64.

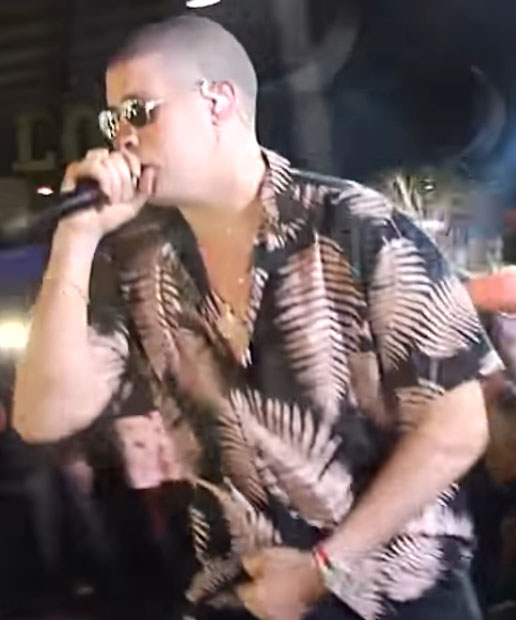
Bad Bunny (pictured) has seven songs from his fourth solo studio album Un Verano Sin Ti on the Year-End list, tying Doja Cat for the most songs of any artist on the list. Of the seven songs, three made it to the top 50, with "Me Porto Bonito" (with Chencho Corleone), "Tití Me Preguntó" and "Moscow Mule" ranking at number 20, number 22 and number 44 respectively.

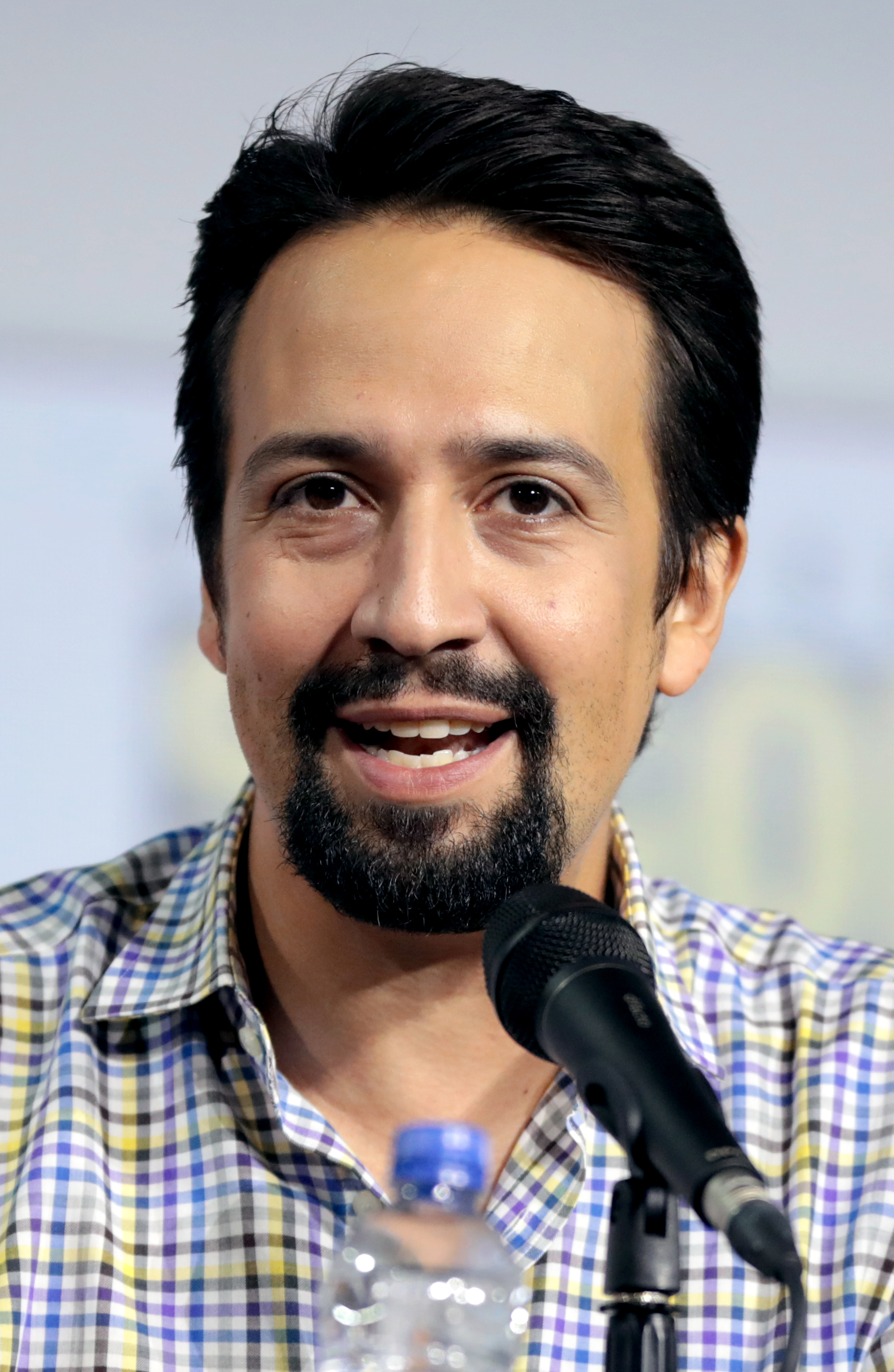
Two songs from Disney's 2021 film Encanto are on the Year-End list, with the number-one hit "We Don't Talk About Bruno" (by Carolina Gaitán, Mauro Castillo, Adassa, Rhenzy Feliz, Diane Guerrero, Stephanie Beatriz and the Encanto cast) at number 24 and "Surface Pressure" (by Jessica Darrow) at number 53. Both songs, along with six other original songs from the film, were written by Lin-Manuel Miranda (pictured).

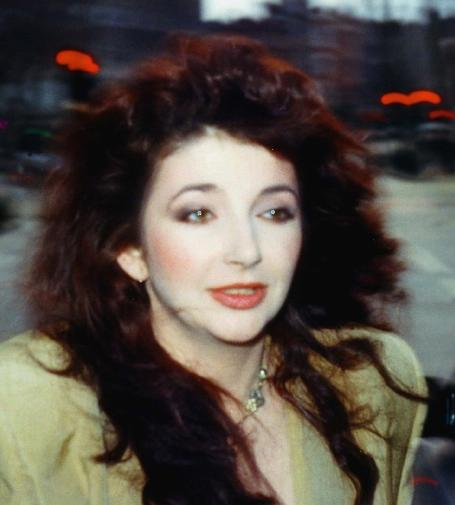
After being featured in the fourth season of the Netflix show Stranger Things, Kate Bush's (pictured) 1985 single "Running Up That Hill (A Deal with God)" hit a new peak of #3 on the Hot 100, staying in the top ten for fifteen weeks, and placing at number 23 on the Year-End list.

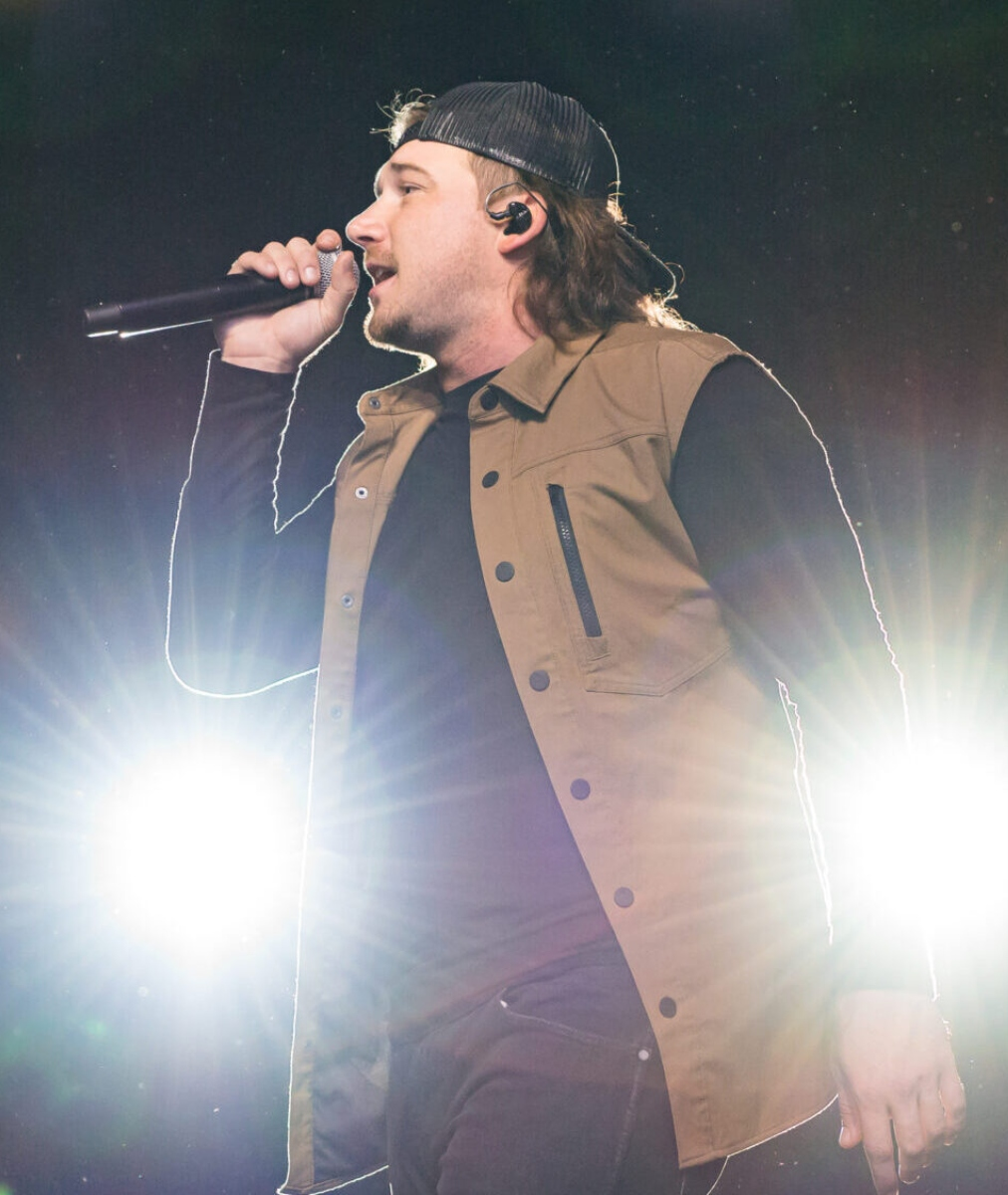
Five songs from Morgan Wallen (pictured) are on the Year-End list, with "Wasted on You" ranking the highest at number 19.

List of songs on Billboard's 2022 Year-End Hot 100 chart
No.	Title	Artist(s)
1	"Heat Waves"	Glass Animals
2	"As It Was"	Harry Styles
3	"Stay"	The Kid Laroi and Justin Bieber
4	"Easy on Me"	Adele
5	"Shivers"	Ed Sheeran
6	"First Class"	Jack Harlow
7	"Big Energy"	Latto
8	"Ghost"	Justin Bieber
9	"Super Gremlin"	Kodak Black
10	"Cold Heart (Pnau Remix)"	Elton John and Dua Lipa
11	"Wait for U"	Future featuring Drake and Tems
12	"About Damn Time"	Lizzo
13	"Bad Habits"	Ed Sheeran
14	"Thats What I Want"	Lil Nas X
15	"Enemy"	Imagine Dragons and JID
16	"Industry Baby"	Lil Nas X and Jack Harlow
17	"ABCDEFU"	Gayle
18	"Need to Know"	Doja Cat
19	"Wasted on You"	Morgan Wallen
20	"Me Porto Bonito"	Bad Bunny and Chencho Corleone
21	"Woman"	Doja Cat
22	"Tití Me Preguntó"	Bad Bunny
23	"Running Up That Hill (A Deal with God)"	Kate Bush
24	"We Don't Talk About Bruno"	Carolina Gaitán, Mauro Castillo, Adassa, Rhenzy Feliz, Diane Guerrero, Stephanie Beatriz and the Encanto cast
25	"Late Night Talking"	Harry Styles
26	"I Like You (A Happier Song)"	Post Malone featuring Doja Cat
27	"You Proof"	Morgan Wallen
28	"Bad Habit"	Steve Lacy
29	"Sunroof"	Nicky Youre and Dazy
30	"One Right Now"	Post Malone and the Weeknd
31	"Good 4 U"	Olivia Rodrigo
32	"Numb Little Bug"	Em Beihold
33	"Jimmy Cooks"	Drake featuring 21 Savage
34	"'Til You Can't"	Cody Johnson
35	"Fancy Like"	Walker Hayes
36	"The Kind of Love We Make"	Luke Combs
37	"I Ain't Worried"	OneRepublic
38	"Break My Soul"	Beyoncé
39	"Something in the Orange"	Zach Bryan
40	"Save Your Tears"	The Weeknd and Ariana Grande
41	"Smokin out the Window"	Silk Sonic (Bruno Mars and Anderson .Paak)
42	"Levitating"	Dua Lipa
43	"In a Minute"	Lil Baby
44	"Moscow Mule"	Bad Bunny
45	"You Right"	Doja Cat and the Weeknd
46	"She Had Me at Heads Carolina"	Cole Swindell
47	"Vegas"	Doja Cat
48	"Pushin P"	Gunna and Future featuring Young Thug
49	"Buy Dirt"	Jordan Davis and Luke Bryan
50	"I Hate U"	SZA
51	"Boyfriend"	Dove Cameron
52	"Glimpse of Us"	Joji
53	"Surface Pressure"	Jessica Darrow
54	"Fall in Love"	Bailey Zimmerman
55	"Love Nwantiti (Ah Ah Ah)"	CKay
56	"Super Freaky Girl"	Nicki Minaj
57	"Hrs and Hrs"	Muni Long
58	"Sand in My Boots"	Morgan Wallen
59	"Mamiii"	Becky G and Karol G
60	"Knife Talk"	Drake featuring 21 Savage and Project Pat
61	"AA"	Walker Hayes
62	"Sweetest Pie"	Megan Thee Stallion and Dua Lipa
63	"Provenza"	Karol G
64	"Essence"	Wizkid featuring Justin Bieber and Tems
65	"All I Want for Christmas Is You"	Mariah Carey
66	"Bam Bam"	Camila Cabello featuring Ed Sheeran
67	"5 Foot 9"	Tyler Hubbard
68	"Get Into It (Yuh)"	Doja Cat
69	"Efecto"	Bad Bunny
70	"Rock and a Hard Place"	Bailey Zimmerman
71	"Doin' This"	Luke Combs
72	"Oh My God"	Adele
73	"Better Days"	Neiked, Mae Muller and Polo G
74	"Meet Me at Our Spot"	The Anxiety: Willow and Tyler Cole
75	"Fingers Crossed"	Lauren Spencer-Smith
76	"All Too Well (Taylor's Version)"	Taylor Swift
77	"Party"	Bad Bunny and Rauw Alejandro
78	"Después de la Playa"	Bad Bunny
79	"You Should Probably Leave"	Chris Stapleton
80	"Rockin' Around the Christmas Tree"	Brenda Lee
81	"Broadway Girls"	Lil Durk featuring Morgan Wallen
82	"Take My Name"	Parmalee
83	"What Happened to Virgil"	Lil Durk featuring Gunna
84	"Puffin on Zootiez"	Future
85	"Like I Love Country Music"	Kane Brown
86	"Jingle Bell Rock"	Bobby Helms
87	"Ojitos Lindos"	Bad Bunny and Bomba Estéreo
88	"Trouble with a Heartbreak"	Jason Aldean
89	"A Holly Jolly Christmas"	Burl Ives
90	"Kiss Me More"	Doja Cat featuring SZA
91	"She Likes It"	Russell Dickerson featuring Jake Scott
92	"Never Say Never"	Cole Swindell and Lainey Wilson
93	"Damn Strait"	Scotty McCreery
94	"She's All I Wanna Be"	Tate McRae
95	"Last Night Lonely"	Jon Pardi
96	"Flower Shops"	Ernest featuring Morgan Wallen
97	"To the Moon"	Jnr Choi and Sam Tompkins
98	"Unholy"	Sam Smith and Kim Petras
99	"One Mississippi"	Kane Brown
100	"Circles Around This Town"	Maren Morris

== See also ==
- 2022 in American music
- Billboard Year-End Hot R&B/Hip-Hop Songs of 2022
- Billboard Year-End Hot Rap Songs of 2022
- List of Billboard Hot 100 number ones of 2022
- List of Billboard Hot 100 top-ten singles in 2022
