= List of Billboard Hot 100 number ones of 2022 =

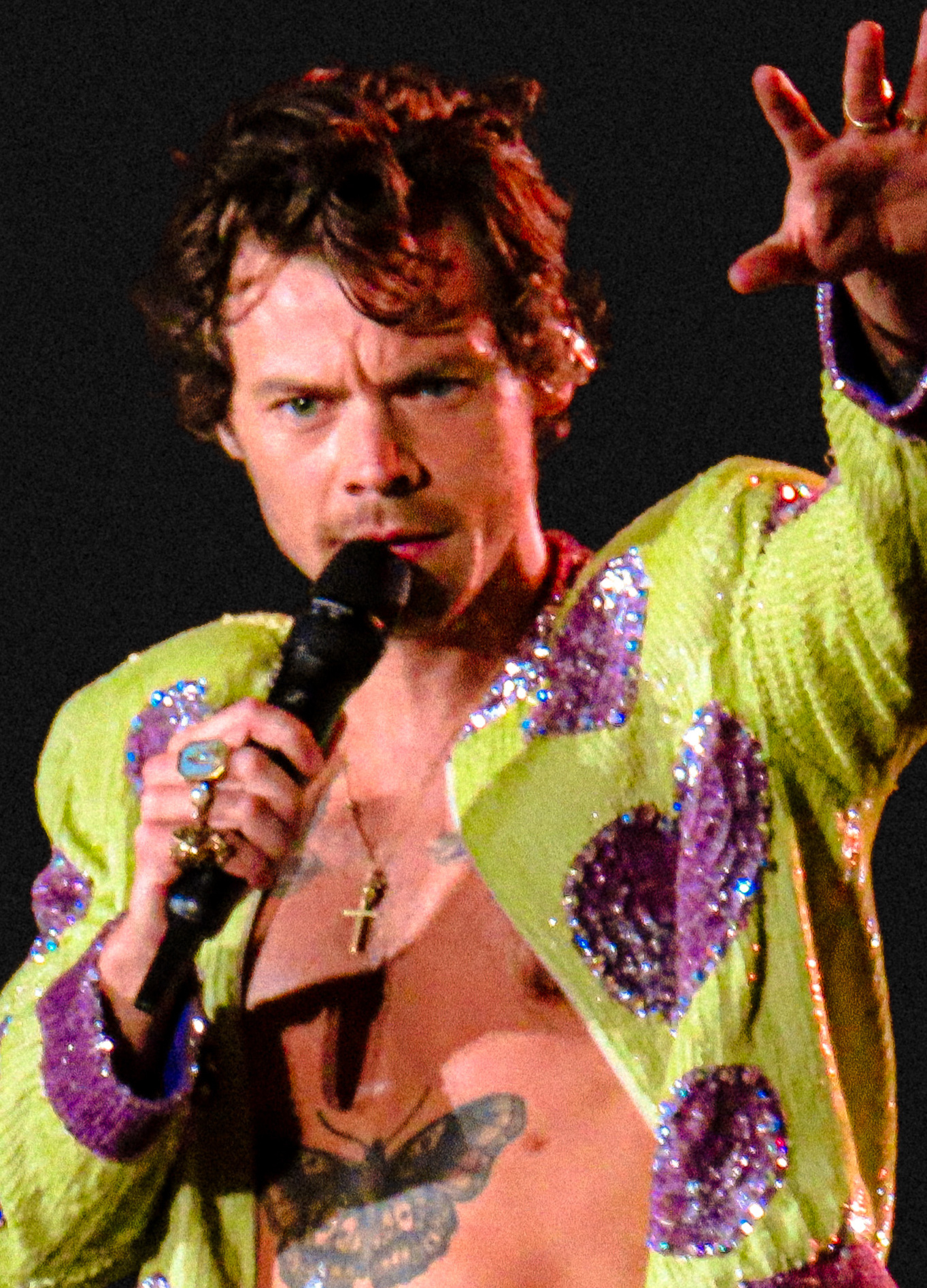
"As It Was" by British singer Harry Styles topped the Hot 100 for 15 weeks, marking the longest-reigning number-one song by a solo act in Hot 100 history at the time.

This is a list of the songs that placed number one in the United States during 2022. The Billboard Hot 100 is a chart that ranks the best-performing songs in the US. Its data is compiled by Luminate Data and published by American music magazine Billboard. The chart is based on each song's weekly physical and digital sales collectively, the amount of airplay it receives on American radio stations, and its audio and video streams on online digital music platforms.

"As It Was", the lead single from British singer Harry Styles' third studio album Harry's House (2022), debuted atop the Hot 100 and spent 15 weeks at the top spot—the most for any song in 2022, and the longest reigning number-one song by a soloist in the 64-year history of the chart, surpassing "Candle in the Wind" (1997) by Elton John, "I Will Always Love You" (1992) by Whitney Houston, and "We Belong Together" (2005) by Mariah Carey. "Heat Waves" (2020) by British indie pop band Glass Animals topped the Billboard Year-End Hot 100, after reaching number-one on the weekly charts in its 59th week, breaking the record for the longest journey to number one, surpassing the 35-week tally of Carey's "All I Want for Christmas Is You" (1994). With 91 total weeks on the chart, the song dethroned The Weeknd's "Blinding Lights" (2020) as the longest-charting song in Hot 100 history.

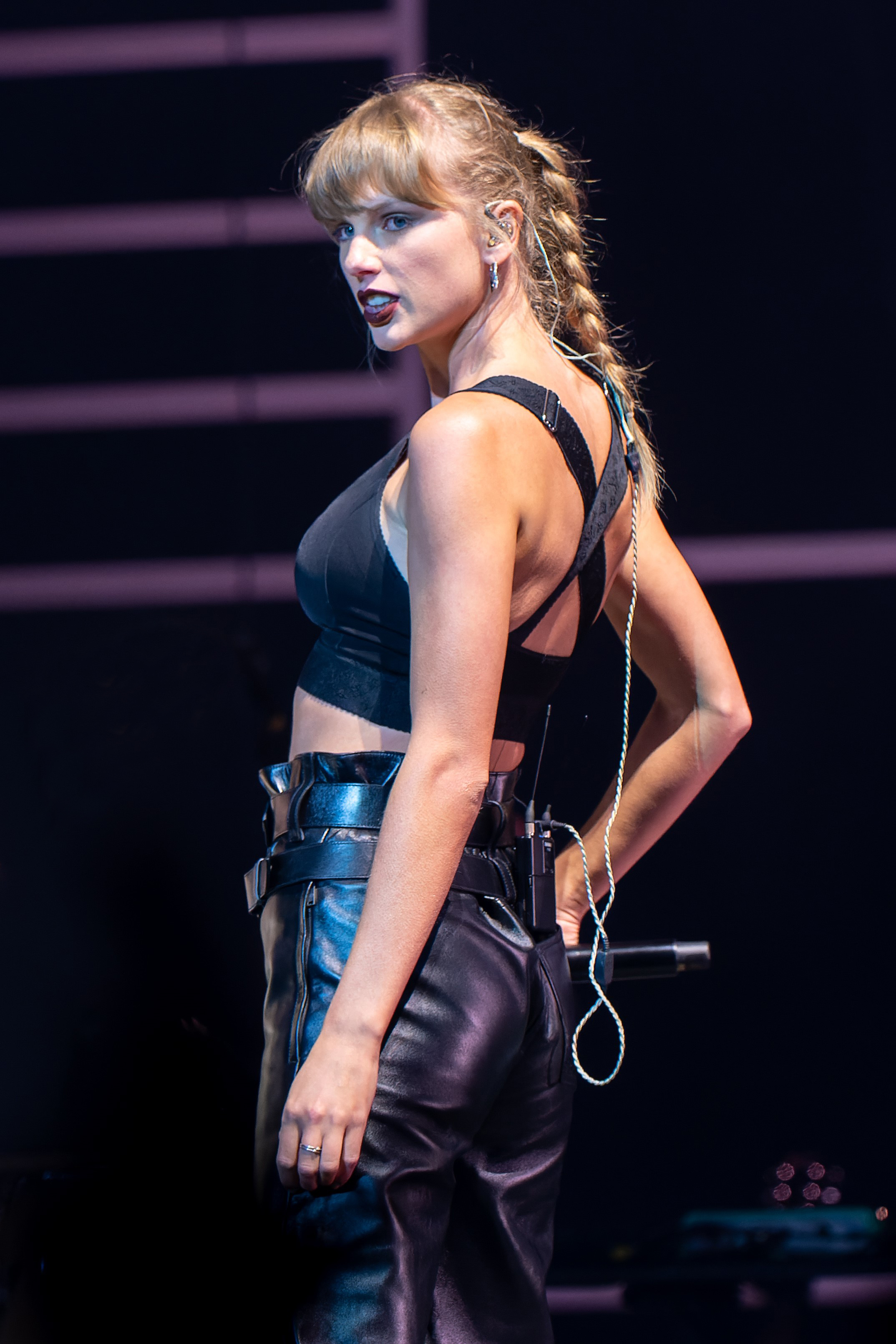
"Anti-Hero" by Taylor Swift is 2022's best-selling song and longest-reigning chart-topper by a female artist.

"Anti-Hero", the lead single from American singer-songwriter Taylor Swift's tenth studio album Midnights (2022), was the best-selling song of 2022. It sold 327,000 digital downloads in its third week on the Hot 100, garnering the biggest sales week for a song in over five years, since Swift's own "Look What You Made Me Do" (2017) sold 353,000 copies in its first week. "We Don't Talk About Bruno" (2021) by Carolina Gaitán, Mauro Castillo, Adassa, Rhenzy Feliz, Diane Guerrero, Stephanie Beatriz and the cast of Encanto broke the all-time Hot 100 record for the most credited artists on a number-one song (seven). It is the second chart-topper from a Disney animated film, after "A Whole New World" by Peabo Bryson and Regina Belle from Aladdin (1992), and the studio's only song that spent five weeks at number one. British singer Sam Smith and German singer Kim Petras became the first publicly non-binary and transgender artists, respectively, to top the Hot 100, after their 2022 single "Unholy" rose to the number-one spot.

Twenty-three acts have reached number one in 2022, with twelve—Gaitán, Castillo, Adassa, Feliz, Guerrero, Beatriz, the Encanto cast, Glass Animals, Tems, Steve Lacy, Smith and Petras—reaching the top spot for the first time. Canadian rapper Drake is the only act to have garnered two number-one songs this year, with his 2022 singles "Wait for U" and "Jimmy Cooks".

== Chart history ==
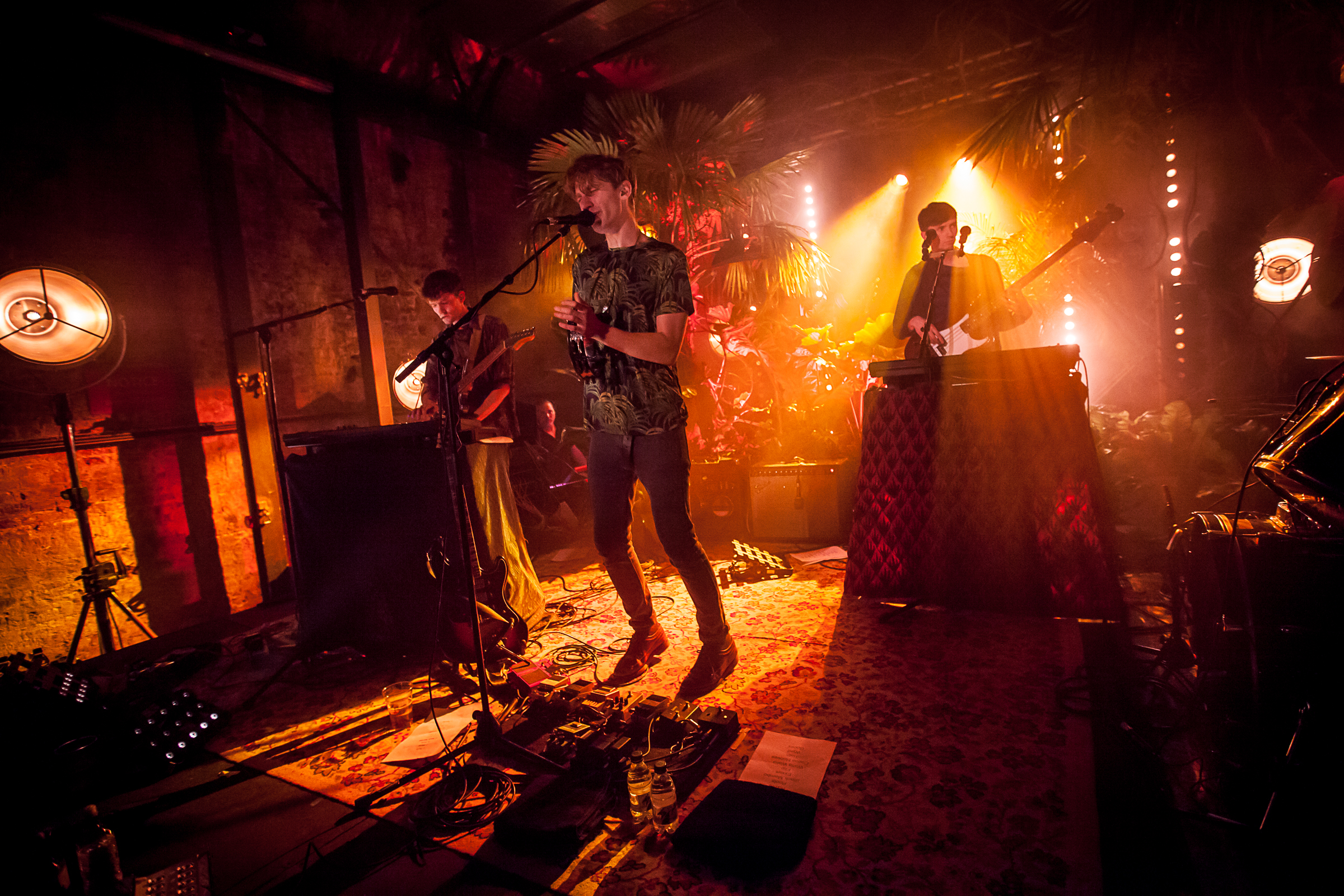
"Heat Waves", the 2020 single by British indie-pop band Glass Animals, topped the Hot 100 in 2022 for five weeks. It became the best-charting song of the year.

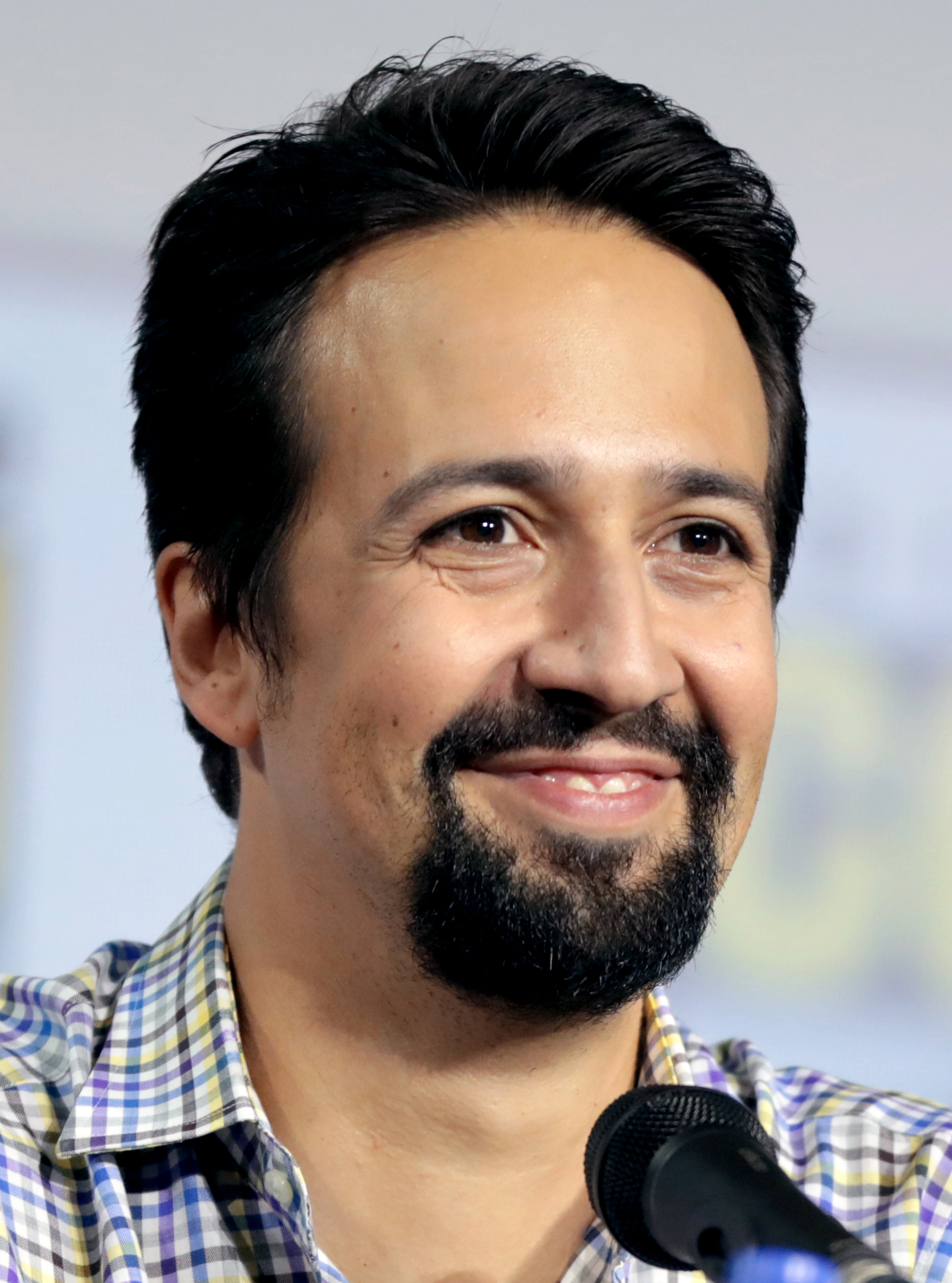
American singer-songwriter Lin-Manuel Miranda wrote "We Don't Talk About Bruno", the first song from a Disney animated film to top the Hot 100 for multiple weeks, spending five weeks at the top.

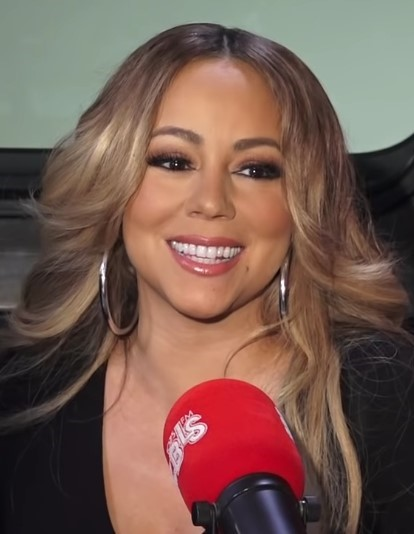
Mariah Carey's "All I Want for Christmas Is You" (1994) returned to spend five weeks atop the chart in 2022.

Key
†	Indicates best-performing song of 2022

No.	Issue date	Song	Artist(s)	Ref.
re	January 1	"All I Want for Christmas Is You"	Mariah Carey	
re	January 8	"All I Want for Christmas Is You"	Mariah Carey	
re	January 15	"Easy on Me"	Adele	
re	January 22	"Easy on Me"	Adele	
re	January 29	"Easy on Me"	Adele	
1133	February 5	"We Don't Talk About Bruno"	Carolina Gaitán, Mauro Castillo, Adassa, Rhenzy Feliz, Diane Guerrero, Stephanie Beatriz and the Encanto cast	
1133	February 12	"We Don't Talk About Bruno"	Carolina Gaitán, Mauro Castillo, Adassa, Rhenzy Feliz, Diane Guerrero, Stephanie Beatriz and the Encanto cast	
1133	February 19	"We Don't Talk About Bruno"	Carolina Gaitán, Mauro Castillo, Adassa, Rhenzy Feliz, Diane Guerrero, Stephanie Beatriz and the Encanto cast	
1133	February 26	"We Don't Talk About Bruno"	Carolina Gaitán, Mauro Castillo, Adassa, Rhenzy Feliz, Diane Guerrero, Stephanie Beatriz and the Encanto cast	
1133	March 5	"We Don't Talk About Bruno"	Carolina Gaitán, Mauro Castillo, Adassa, Rhenzy Feliz, Diane Guerrero, Stephanie Beatriz and the Encanto cast	
1134	March 12	"Heat Waves" †	Glass Animals	
1134	March 19	"Heat Waves" †	Glass Animals	
1134	March 26	"Heat Waves" †	Glass Animals	
1134	April 2	"Heat Waves" †	Glass Animals	
1134	April 9	"Heat Waves" †	Glass Animals	
1135	April 16	"As It Was"	Harry Styles	
1136	April 23	"First Class"	Jack Harlow	
re	April 30	"As It Was"	Harry Styles	
re	May 7	"As It Was"	Harry Styles	
1137	May 14	"Wait for U"	Future featuring Drake and Tems	
re	May 21	"First Class"	Jack Harlow	
re	May 28	"First Class"	Jack Harlow	
re	June 4	"As It Was"	Harry Styles	
re	June 11	"As It Was"	Harry Styles	
re	June 18	"As It Was"	Harry Styles	
re	June 25	"As It Was"	Harry Styles	
1138	July 2	"Jimmy Cooks"	Drake featuring 21 Savage	
re	July 9	"As It Was"	Harry Styles	
re	July 16	"As It Was"	Harry Styles	
re	July 23	"As It Was"	Harry Styles	
1139	July 30	"About Damn Time"	Lizzo	
1139	August 6	"About Damn Time"	Lizzo	
1140	August 13	"Break My Soul"	Beyoncé	
1140	August 20	"Break My Soul"	Beyoncé	
1141	August 27	"Super Freaky Girl"	Nicki Minaj	
re	September 3	"As It Was"	Harry Styles	
re	September 10	"As It Was"	Harry Styles	
re	September 17	"As It Was"	Harry Styles	
re	September 24	"As It Was"	Harry Styles	
re	October 1	"As It Was"	Harry Styles	
1142	October 8	"Bad Habit"	Steve Lacy	
1142	October 15	"Bad Habit"	Steve Lacy	
1142	October 22	"Bad Habit"	Steve Lacy	
1143	October 29	"Unholy"	Sam Smith and Kim Petras	
1144	November 5	"Anti-Hero"	Taylor Swift	
1144	November 12	"Anti-Hero"	Taylor Swift	
1144	November 19	"Anti-Hero"	Taylor Swift	
1144	November 26	"Anti-Hero"	Taylor Swift	
1144	December 3	"Anti-Hero"	Taylor Swift	
1144	December 10	"Anti-Hero"	Taylor Swift	
re	December 17	"All I Want for Christmas Is You"	Mariah Carey	
re	December 24	"All I Want for Christmas Is You"	Mariah Carey	
re	December 31	"All I Want for Christmas Is You"	Mariah Carey	

== Number-one artists ==
List of number-one artists by total weeks at number one
Position	Artist	Weeks at No. 1
1	Harry Styles	15
2	Taylor Swift	6
3	Carolina Gaitán	5
3	Mauro Castillo	5
3	Adassa	5
3	Rhenzy Feliz	5
3	Diane Guerrero	5
3	Stephanie Beatriz	5
3	Encanto cast	5
3	Glass Animals	5
3	Mariah Carey	5
12	Adele	3
12	Jack Harlow	3
12	Steve Lacy	3
15	Drake	2
15	Lizzo	2
15	Beyoncé	2
18	Future	1
18	Tems	1
18	21 Savage	1
18	Nicki Minaj	1
18	Sam Smith	1
18	Kim Petras	1

== See also ==
- List of Billboard 200 number-one albums of 2022
- List of Billboard Global 200 number ones of 2022
- List of Billboard Hot 100 top-ten singles in 2022
- List of Billboard Hot 100 number-one singles of the 2020s
- Billboard Year-End Hot 100 singles of 2022
- 2022 in American music
