= I'm on One (Future song) =

2022 song by Future featuring Drake

Song by Future featuring Drake

from the album I Never Liked You
- Released: April 29, 2022
- Genre: Trap
- Length: 3:56
- Label: Freebandz; Epic
- Songwriters: Nayvadius Wilburn; Aubrey Graham; Torey Montana
- Producer: Montana

"I'm on One" (stylized in all caps) is a song by American rapper Future from his ninth studio album I Never Liked You (2022). It features Canadian rapper Drake and was produced by Torey Montana.

== Background ==
Following the song's release, Future shared details of how it came together in an interview on Apple Music 1:

"We just did those records just because it was just the timing of it, but it was inevitable, you know what I'm saying, for it to happen like that. I'm thinking I was in LA when I recorded that song [I’m On One] I played it for him after I did it. Once it was done, I played the record for him."

== Composition ==
The song sees Future and Drake rapping about indulging in their opulence, which involves a lifestyle of drugs and sex.

== Charts ==
Chart performance for "I'm on One"
Chart (2022)	Peak position
Australia (ARIA)	80
Canada Hot 100 (Billboard)	16
Global 200 (Billboard)	17
South Africa Streaming (TOSAC)	11
UK Singles (Official Charts)	50
US Billboard Hot 100	11
US Hot R&B/Hip-Hop Songs (Billboard)	7

== Certifications ==
Certifications for "I'm on One"
Region	Certification	Certified units/sales
Canada (Music Canada)	Gold	40,000^{‡}
United States (RIAA)	Platinum	1,000,000^{‡}
^{‡} Sales+streaming figures based on certification alone.
