= I Never Liked You (album) =

Studio album by Future
- Released: April 29, 2022
- Studio: Jungle City (New York City)
- Length: 48:41
- Labels: Freebandz; Epic
- Producers: Akachi; ATL Jacob; Bass Charity; DJ Moon; DMC Global; DY; Daan; Dez Wright; Dre Moon; FnZ; HitmanAudio; Jasper Harris; Julien Anderson; MoXart Beatz; Nils; Russell Chell; Slowburnz; Southside; Sprngbrk; Taurus; TM88; Too Dope; Torey Montana; Wavy; Wheezy

Future chronology
Pluto × Baby Pluto (2020)	I Never Liked You (2022)	We Don't Trust You (2024)

Singles from I Never Liked You
- 1. "Worst Day" Released: February 11, 2022; 2. "Wait for U" Released: May 3, 2022; 3. "Keep It Burnin" Released: May 6, 2022; 4. "712PM" Released: June 6, 2022; 5. "Love You Better" Released: July 26, 2022

I Never Liked You is the ninth studio album by American rapper Future. It was released on April 29, 2022, by Freebandz and Epic Records. The production on the album was handled by multiple producers including ATL Jacob, FnZ, Southside, Taurus, TM88, and Wheezy, among others. The album features guest appearances from Kanye West, Gunna, Young Thug, Drake, Tems, EST Gee, and Kodak Black. The deluxe edition was released three days later on May 2, 2022, with additional guest appearances from Babyface Ray, 42 Dugg, Lil Baby, Lil Durk, and Freebandz affiliate Young Scooter, who would make his final guest appearance before his death on March 28, 2025.

I Never Liked You was supported by five singles: "Worst Day", "Wait for U", "Keep It Burnin", "712PM ", and "Love You Better". The album received generally positive reviews from critics and was a huge commercial success. It debuted atop the US Billboard 200, earning 222,000 album-equivalent units in its first week. It is Future's eighth US number-one and 15th top-10 album. In December 2024, the album was certified double platinum by the Recording Industry Association of America (RIAA).

== Promotion ==
The album's first single, "Worst Day", was released on February 11, 2022, as well an accompanying music video. The song debuted at number 34 on the US Billboard Hot 100.

"Wait for U" featuring Canadian rapper and singer Drake and Nigerian singer Tems, was released to American rhythmic contemporary radio on May 3, 2022, as the second official single from the album. Its music video was released on May 5. The song debuted at number one on the Billboard Hot 100, becoming Future's second, Drake's tenth, and Tems' first number-one hit on the Hot 100.

The music video for the song "Keep It Burnin", featuring American rapper Kanye West, was released on April 29, 2022. It was sent to Italian contemporary hit radio on May 6, 2022, as the third official single from the album. The song debuted at number 15 on the Billboard Hot 100.

"712PM" was sent to Italian contemporary hit radio on June 6, 2022, as the fourth official single from the album. The song debuted at number eight on the Billboard Hot 100.

"Love You Better" was released to American rhythmic contemporary radio on July 26, 2022, as the fifth official single from the album. The song debuted at number 12 on the Billboard Hot 100.

== Critical reception ==
Professional ratings
Aggregate scores
Source	Rating
AnyDecentMusic?	6.5/10
Metacritic	69/100
Review scores
Source	Rating
AllMusic	3/5 stars
Clash	6/10
Exclaim!	7/10
HipHopDX	3.5/5
HotNewHipHop	82%
NME	4/5 stars
Pitchfork	6.0/10
Rolling Stone	3.5/5 stars

I Never Liked You was met with generally positive reviews. At Metacritic, which assigns a normalized rating out of 100 to reviews from professional publications, the album received an average score of 69, based on seven reviews. Aggregator AnyDecentMusic? gave it 6.5 out of 10, based on their assessment of the critical consensus.

Kyann-Sian Williams from NME enjoyed the album, saying, "At times, in the past, he has relied on his autotune to compensate for lacklustre lyricism, but Future is a megamind whose pioneering spirit is the very reason trap feels alive today. With I Never Liked You, you'll happily applaud him for that". In a positive review, Rolling Stone's Mosi Reeves said, "I Never Liked You is no DS2, but it has a compositional sweep often absent from his work. Most importantly, it's an album with layers that's more engaging than recent fare such as 2019's appealing yet boilerplate Future Hndrxx Presents: The Wizrd and Save Me EP; and 2020's one-two punch of desultory hive-bait, High Off Life and Pluto × Baby Pluto, the latter with Lil Uzi Vert". Exclaim! critic Michael Di Gennaro said, "It's not a complete return to form, but it's a reminder that even later in the journeys, all-time greats' talent and dedication to their craft can still yield impressive results". Reviewing the album for HipHopDX, Anthony Malone stated, "I Never Liked You continues his stagnation from High Off Life, settling for comfort rather than experimentation. The songs are rehashes he's done more effectively in the past. His signature consistency is still there".

In a lukewarm review, Pitchfork's Alphonse Pierre wrote, "Stymied by formulaic collaborations and unmemorable beats, the rapper's latest has the ingredients of a really good Future album but lacks the depth of one". Robin Murray of Clash said, "It's not a bad record – the highs more than justify your entrance – but with a rumoured follow up on the way, perhaps it's time for Future to break a few of his own rules once more".

=== Year-end lists ===
Select year-end rankings of I Never Liked You
Critic/Publication	List	Rank	Ref.
Complex	The Best Albums of 2022	32	
Rolling Stone	The 100 Best Albums of 2022	72	

=== Industry awards ===
Awards and nominations for I Never Liked You
Year	Ceremony	Category	Result	Ref.
2022	BET Hip Hop Awards	Album of the Year	Nominated	
2023	Billboard Music Awards	Top Rap Album	Nominated	
2023	Grammy Awards	Best Rap Album	Nominated	

== Commercial performance ==
I Never Liked You debuted at number one on the US Billboard 200 chart, earning 222,000 album-equivalent units (including 6,000 copies in pure album sales) in its first week. This became Future's eighth US number-one, 15th US top-10 album and the largest week for any album in 2022 at the time. The album also accumulated a total. of 283.75 million on-demand official streams for the album's tracks. In its second week, the album dropped to number two on the chart, earning an additional 116,000 units. In its third week, the album dropped to number three on the chart, earning 89,000 more units. In its fourth week, the album dropped to number four on the chart, earning 77,000 units. On December 9, 2024, the album was certified double platinum by the Recording Industry Association of America (RIAA) for combined sales and album-equivalent units of over two million units in the United States. The album was the seventh best-selling album of the 2022 in the United States, according to Hits, moved a total 1,328,000 album-equivalent units (including 16,000 copies in pure album sales).

== Track listing ==
I Never Liked You track listing
No.	Title	Writer(s)	Producer(s)	Length
1.	"712PM"	Nayvadius Wilburn; Wesley Glass; Bryan Simmons; Corey Moon; Nicholas Berlinger; Stephen Gilarde; Filip Stefanczyk; Glen Nakai	Wheezy; TM88; DJ Moon; MoXart Beatz; Stefanccino	2:53
2.	"I'm Dat Nigga"	Wilburn; Joshua Luellen; Dwan Avery; Nicholas Santos	Southside; DY; Slowburnz	4:32
3.	"Keep It Burnin" (featuring Kanye West)	Wilburn; Tauren Strickland; Kanye West; Jacob Canady; Darryon Bunton	ATL Jacob; DB!^{[a]}	3:27
4.	"For a Nut" (featuring Gunna and Young Thug)	Wilburn; Sergio Kitchens; Jeffery Williams; Canady	ATL Jacob; Yoajm^{[a]}	3:28
5.	"Puffin on Zootiez"	Wilburn; Nils Noehden; Simmons; Lesidney Ragland	Nils; TM88; Too Dope	2:53
6.	"Gold Stacks"	Wilburn; DeVonte Cromartin; Lyle McLoughlin	DMC Global	2:42
7.	"Wait for U" (featuring Drake and Tems)	Wilburn; Aubrey Graham; Temilade Openiyi; Canady; Isaac De Boni; Michael Mule; Israel Ayomide; Oluwatoroti Oke; Tejiri Akpoghene	ATL Jacob; FnZ; 1srael; Sonic Major; Akpoghene	3:10
8.	"Love You Better"	Wilburn; Canady; De Boni; Mule; Jayla Darden	ATL Jacob; FnZ; Darden	2:10
9.	"Massaging Me"	Wilburn; Canady	ATL Jacob	1:46
10.	"Chickens" (featuring EST Gee)	Wilburn; George Stone III; Glass; Dylan Cleary-Krell	Wheezy; Dez Wright	3:15
11.	"We Jus Wanna Get High"	Wilburn; Luellen; Canady	Southside; ATL Jacob	2:13
12.	"Voodoo" (featuring Kodak Black)	Wilburn; Bill Kapri; Luellen; Douglas Ford	Southside	3:31
13.	"Holy Ghost"	Wilburn; Canady	ATL Jacob	2:50
14.	"The Way Things Going"	Wilburn; Simmons; Daan Huijbregts	TM88; Daan	3:00
15.	"I'm on One" (featuring Drake)	Wilburn; Graham; Torey Gilmer	Torey Montana	3:56
16.	"Back to the Basics"	Wilburn; Andre Proctor; Montrell Martinez; Harissis Tsakmaklis; Feliciano Ecar; Jorge Cardoso; Luzian Tuetsch; Floyd Bentley; Olivia McCarthy	Dre Moon; Wavy; Bass Charity; SprngBrk; Joy	2:57
Total length:				48:41

Deluxe edition (bonus tracks)
No.	Title	Writer(s)	Producer(s)	Length
17.	"No Security" (featuring Babyface Ray)	Wilburn; Marcellus Register; Canady	ATL Jacob	2:41
18.	"Like Me" (featuring 42 Dugg and Lil Baby)	Wilburn; Dion Hayes; Dominique Jones; Julien Anderson; Gregory Sanders Jr.	Anderson; HitmanAudio	2:13
19.	"Affiliated" (featuring Lil Durk)	Wilburn; Durk Banks; Simmons; Ragland; Hunter Brown	TM88; Too Dope; Akachi	3:04
20.	"Stayed Down" (featuring Young Scooter)	Wilburn; Kenneth Bailey; Canady; Ansel Montgomery	ATL Jacob; YoungerNextLife	2:52
21.	"Worst Day"	Wilburn; Glass; Taurus Currie Jr.; Jasper Harris; Russell Chell	Wheezy; Taurus; Harris; Chell	3:07
22.	"Just the Beginning"	Wilburn; Currie; James Therrien	Taurus; JT Beats	2:53
Total length:				65:30

Notes

- ^{^[a]} signifies an uncredited co-producer

Sample credits

- "712PM" contains a sample of "Data 2.0", written by Aura Qualic and performed by Hatsune Miku.
- "Wait for U" contains a sample of "Higher", written by Tems and Tejiri Akpoghene, as performed by the former.

== Personnel ==
- Joe LaPorta – mastering
- Ethan Stevens – mixing
- Eric Manco – engineering (tracks 1–3, 5, 7–16)
- Bryan Anzel – engineering (4, 6, 15)
- Noel Cadastre – engineering (7, 15)
- Khaya Gilika – engineering (10)
- Braden Davies – engineering assistance
- Zachary Acosta – engineering assistance

== Charts ==
=== Weekly charts ===
Weekly chart performance for I Never Liked You
Chart (2022–2024)	Peak position
Australian Albums (ARIA)	1
Austrian Albums (Ö3 Austria)	3
Belgian Albums (Ultratop Flanders)	10
Belgian Albums (Ultratop Wallonia)	18
Canadian Albums (Billboard)	1
Czech Albums (ČNS IFPI)	6
Danish Albums (Hitlisten)	5
Dutch Albums (Album Top 100)	2
Finnish Albums (Suomen virallinen lista)	13
French Albums (SNEP)	19
German Albums (Offizielle Top 100)	13
Irish Albums (Official Charts)	6
Italian Albums (FIMI)	36
Lithuanian Albums (AGATA)	1
New Zealand Albums (RMNZ)	1
Nigerian Albums (TurnTable)	25
Norwegian Albums (VG-lista)	5
Slovak Albums (ČNS IFPI)	4
Spanish Albums (PROMUSICAE)	50
Swedish Albums (Sverigetopplistan)	23
Swiss Albums (Schweizer Hitparade)	3
UK Albums (Official Charts)	2
UK R&B Albums (Official Charts)	27
US Billboard 200	1
US Top R&B/Hip-Hop Albums (Billboard)	1

=== Year-end charts ===
2022 year-end chart performance for I Never Liked You
Chart (2022)	Position
Canadian Albums (Billboard)	38
Icelandic Albums (Tónlistinn)	80
US Billboard 200	12
US Top R&B/Hip-Hop Albums (Billboard)	4

2023 year-end chart performance for I Never Liked You
Chart (2023)	Position
US Billboard 200	32
US Top R&B/Hip-Hop Albums (Billboard)	13

2024 year-end chart performance for I Never Liked You
Chart (2024)	Position
US Billboard 200	87
US Top R&B/Hip-Hop Albums (Billboard)	33

2025 year-end chart performance for I Never Liked You
Chart (2025)	Position
US Billboard 200	96
US Top R&B/Hip-Hop Albums (Billboard)	32

== Certifications ==
Certifications for I Never Liked You
Region	Certification	Certified units/sales
Canada (Music Canada)	Gold	40,000^{‡}
Denmark (IFPI Danmark)	Gold	10,000^{‡}
United Kingdom (BPI)	Gold	100,000^{‡}
United States (RIAA)	2× Platinum	2,000,000^{‡}
^{‡} Sales+streaming figures based on certification alone.

== Release history ==
Release dates and formats for I Never Liked You
Region	Date	Label(s)	Format(s)	Edition	Ref.
Various	April 29, 2022	Freebandz; Epic	Digital download; streaming	Standard	
Various	May 2, 2022	Freebandz; Epic	CD	Standard	
Various	May 2, 2022	Freebandz; Epic	Digital download; streaming	Deluxe	
