= 712PM =

Single by Future

from the album I Never Liked You
- Released: June 6, 2022
- Genre: Hip hop; Trap
- Length: 3:45
- Label: Epic; Freebandz
- Songwriters: Nayvadius Wilburn; Wesley Glass; Bryan Simmons; Corey Moon; Nicholas Berlinger; Stephen Gilarde
- Producers: Wheezy; TM88; DJ Moon; MoXart Beatz; Stefanccino

Music video
- "712PM" on YouTube

"712PM" is a song by American rapper Future from his ninth studio album I Never Liked You (2022). It was released as a single on June 6, 2022. The song sampled "Data 2.0" which was performed by Hatsune Miku and by Aura Qualic which Big Boi also sampled for his song "Kill Jill" featuring Jeezy and Killer Mike.

== Music video ==
The music video for "712PM" released at November 30, 2022 which was directed by Travis Scott. The music video shows slick visuals of modern Hollywood, the fame, the Maybach flash across the screen next to Future and raps next to a fire of explosions.

== Charts ==
Chart (2022)	Peak position
Canada Hot 100 (Billboard)	27
New Zealand Hot Singles (RMNZ)	37
US Billboard Hot 100	8
US Hot R&B/Hip-Hop Songs (Billboard)	5

== Certifications ==
Region	Certification	Certified units/sales
United States (RIAA)	Platinum	1,000,000^{‡}
^{‡} Sales+streaming figures based on certification alone.
