= Handsomer =

2022 single by Russ

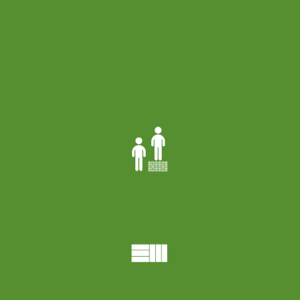

Single by Russ
- Released: February 4, 2022
- Length: 2:23
- Label: Diemon
- Songwriter: Russ
- Producer: Russ

Russ singles chronology
"Remember Me (Remix)" (2022)	"Handsomer" (2022)	"Real" (2022)

Ktlyn singles chronology
"No Photos" (2021)	"Handsomer (Remix)" (2022)

Music video
- "Handsomer" on YouTube

Music video
- "Handsomer" (Remix) on YouTube

"Handsomer" is a song by American rapper Russ. It was released on February 4, 2022, through Russ's Diemon label. The song sees Russ boasting about how his wealth makes him more handsome than he already is. A remix was released on March 9, 2022, featuring rapper Ktlyn's verse, which she had uploaded to the video-sharing app TikTok and went viral.

== Background ==
"Handsomer" was first previewed by Russ on January 9, 2022, when he posted a video on social media of him listening to the song. It was released a week later as part of Russ's weekly song releases which he resumed in January 2022. He promoted the track by dueting with creators on TikTok, initiating an "open verse" challenge where users could add their own verse. Rapper Ktlyn responded with her verse, which eventually appeared on the official remix after it garnered popularity. On the song, Russ raps about how money makes him more charming. Paul Duong of Rap Radar deemed it an "expensive" track, noting how "Russ boasts his paper and watches out for the women who are only intrigued by his wealth". HotNewHipHop's Alexander Cole called it a "banger", and noted that "Handsomer" is atypical to Russ's previous love song releases, as he appears "unabashedly braggadocios" on the song. Cole said the song's title "makes for a nice use" of a non-existent word, while further complimenting the beat as "catchy", and Russ's flows as "solid, as always".

== Charts ==
=== Weekly charts ===
Weekly chart performance for "Handsomer"
Chart (2022)	Peak position
Canada Hot 100 (Billboard)	20
Global 200 (Billboard)	57
Hungary (Single Top 40)	7
New Zealand (Recorded Music NZ)	30
US Billboard Hot 100	40
US Hot R&B/Hip-Hop Songs (Billboard)	14
US Rhythmic Airplay (Billboard)	11

=== Year-end charts ===
2022 year-end chart performance for "Handsomer"
Chart (2022)	Position
US Hot R&B/Hip-Hop Songs (Billboard)	56
US Digital Song Sales (Billboard)	69

== Certifications ==
Certifications for "Handsomer"
Region	Certification	Certified units/sales
New Zealand (RMNZ)	Gold	15,000^{‡}
United States (RIAA)	Platinum	1,000,000^{‡}
^{‡} Sales+streaming figures based on certification alone.
