= Save Me (Future EP) =

EP by Future
- Released: June 7, 2019
- Genres: Hip hop; R&B
- Length: 20:14
- Labels: Freebandz; Epic
- Producers: Bobby Raps; Detail; Dre Moon; Fuse; Fxxxxy; G. Ry; K-Major; Nellz; Richie Souf; Will Yanez

Future chronology
The Wizrd (2019)	Save Me (2019)	High Off Life (2020)

Save Me (stylized in all caps) is the debut extended play by the American rapper Future, released through Freebandz and Epic Records on June 7, 2019. Save Me debuted at number five on the US Billboard 200.

== Background ==
Save Me was announced on June 5, 2019, via Future's Instagram account, and later confirmed as an EP by Apple Music.

The cover-art and direction was made by Enfants Riches Déprimés' founder and director Henri Alexander Levy. It features a picture of Babette "Babsi" Dögen, the youngest drug-victim documented in Germany.

== Critical reception ==
Professional ratings
Aggregate scores
Source	Rating
Metacritic	63/100
Review scores
Source	Rating
Consequence	C−
Exclaim!	6/10
Highsnobiety	3.0/5
HipHopDX	3.2/5
Pitchfork	6.4/10
RapReviews	6/10
Rolling Stone	3.5/5 stars
Spectrum Culture	3/5 stars

At Metacritic, which assigns a normalized rating out of 100 to reviews from professional publications, Save Me received an average score of 63, based on six reviews, indicating "generally favorable reviews".

Reed Jackson of Pitchfork said, "[Future's] latest EP proves he's still a master of melancholic detail, but thematically and sonically, the Atlanta superstar has hit a wall". Christopher Weingarten of Rolling Stone wrote, "...this seven-song companion piece, coming less than five months on its heels, is something else: a fascinating "what if" scenario, a more experimental Future working within modern rap techniques and pushing their boundaries to the blurry edges". HipHopDX critic Cherise Johnson said, "SAVE ME, opposed to previous collaborative EPs such as 2016's Purple Reign with Metro Boomin, feels incomplete for it's lacking the divine energy felt from previous Future projects". In a mixed review, Exclaim!'s Calum Slingerland stated: "Aforementioned moments of experimentation show a continued development of Future's "Hendrix" alter ego, but there's something to be said for getting to know him over a longer runtime."

Spectrum Culture's Daniel Bromfield wrote the following: "Future has long been one of rap's most consistent artists, but for the first time since his early shots at stardom, he sounds confused." Lucy Shanker of Consequence saying "There's no denying Future's ability to constantly curate content, but perhaps with a little more time and focus, Save Me could have been significantly better".

== Commercial performance ==
Save Me debuted at number five on the US Billboard 200 with 42,000 album-equivalent units (including 5,000 pure album sales) in its first week.

== Track listing ==
Save Me track listing
No.	Title	Writer(s)	Producer(s)	Length
1.	"Xanax Damage"	Nayvadius Wilburn; Kyle Nelson; Robert Richardson; William Yanez; Elizabeth Nistico	Bobby Raps; Nellz; Will Yanez	1:44
2.	"St. Lucia"	Wilburn; Eduardo Earle; Kendricke Brown	Fuse; K-Major	3:18
3.	"Please Tell Me"	Wilburn; Tony Son	Richie Souf	3:24
4.	"Shotgun"	Wilburn; Noel Fisher; Markiee Jones; Joshua Adams; Ruben Raymond; Justin Rodriguez; Justin Bradley	Detail	4:18
5.	"Government Official"	Wilburn; Maudell Watkins	Fxxxxy	2:30
6.	"Extra"	Wilburn; Watkins; Ryan Martínez; Atupele Ndisale; Amber Olivier; David Patino; Christopher Wood	Fxxxxy; G. Ry; Geronimo^{[a]}	2:53
7.	"Love Thy Enemies"	Wilburn; Andre Proctor	Dre Moon	2:07
Total length:				20:14

Notes

- ^{^[a]} signifies an uncredited co-producer
- "Xanax Damage" is stylized as "XanaX Damage"

Sample credits

- "Shotgun" contains a sample from "Promise", written by Ciara Harris, Jasper Cameron, Jamal Jones, and Elvis Williams, performed by Ciara.
- "Extra" contains a sample from "One Unread", written by Atupele Ndisale, Amber Olivier, David Patino, and Christopher Wood, performed by Amber Olivier.

== Personnel ==
Credits adapted from Tidal.

- Bryan Anzel – recording (tracks 1, 7), engineering (track 3)
- Detail – recording (track 4), mixing (track 4)
- Manny Marroquin – mixing (tracks 1, 6, 7)
- Fabian Marasciullo – mixing (tracks 2, 3, 5)
- Glenn Schick – mastering (all tracks)
- Eric Manco – engineering (all tracks), recording (track 3)
- Fxxxxy – engineering (all tracks), recording (tracks 2, 5, 6)
- Mike Synphony – engineering assistant (tracks 3, 4, 7)

== Charts ==
Chart performance for Save Me
Chart (2019)	Peak position
Belgian Albums (Ultratop Flanders)	127
Belgian Albums (Ultratop Wallonia)	184
Canadian Albums (Billboard)	27
French Albums (SNEP)	154
Lithuanian Albums (AGATA)	83
UK Albums (Official Charts)	59
US Billboard 200	5
