= Keep It Burnin =

2022 single by Future featuring Kanye West

Single by Future featuring Kanye West

from the album I Never Liked You
- Released: May 6, 2022
- Recorded: 2022
- Genre: Trap
- Length: 3:27
- Label: Freebandz; Epic
- Songwriters: Nayvadius Wilburn; Kanye West; Tauren Strickland; Jacob Canady; Darryon Bunton
- Producers: ATL Jacob; DB! (co.)

Future singles chronology
"Wait for U" (2022)	"Keep It Burnin" (2022)	"Pressurelicious" (2022)

Kanye West singles chronology
"City of Gods" (2022)	"Keep It Burnin" (2022)	"True Love" (2022)

Music video
- "Keep It Burnin" on YouTube

"Keep It Burnin" (stylized in all caps) is a song by American rapper Future featuring fellow American rapper Kanye West. It was first released on April 29, 2022, from Future's ninth studio album I Never Liked You, with an accompanying music video. It was sent to Italian contemporary hit radio on May 6, 2022, as the third official single from the album.

== Background ==
"Keep It Burnin" was originally recorded for Kanye West's eleventh studio album, Donda 2 (2022). An early version with unfinished vocals from West appeared on a demo of the album, exclusive to his $200 Stem Player, but was removed shortly after. This version contained a sample of "Burning Down the House" by new wave band Talking Heads.

== Composition and lyrics ==
The song features a "progressive" trap production, over which the two artists reflect on where they each came from. Kanye West addresses his divorce from Kim Kardashian, first referencing buying a house next to hers ("I'ma buy a home next to your home if I miss you"). He also makes references to Kardashian's lack of support for his 2020 presidential campaign, as well as his plan to run for president again in 2024: "Rubbin' on your ass but your mouth is the issue / When you run for '24, I bet your spouse gon' be with you". Meanwhile, Future raps about his journey to fame and his past ("Seen too much violence, done seen too much death / Bodies on bodies, got a gang full of them / Raised by gangsters, prostitutes and pimps").

== Music video ==
The official music video was directed by Rick Nyce. In it, Future and Kanye West are seen under a circular spotlight in a warehouse, surrounded by darkness, through bird's-eye view. Both are dressed in all black, while Future wears a hood and sunglasses and West's face is covered with a black mask. They rap and show some dance moves while surrounded by their crews.

== Charts ==
Chart performance for "Keep It Burnin"
Chart (2022)	Peak position
Canada Hot 100 (Billboard)	33
Global 200 (Billboard)	26
South Africa Streaming (TOSAC)	13
US Billboard Hot 100	15
US Hot R&B/Hip-Hop Songs (Billboard)	10

== Release history ==
Release history for "Keep It Burnin"
Region	Date	Format	Label	Ref.
Italy	May 6, 2022	Contemporary hit radio	Freebandz; Epic	
