= Worst Day =

2022 single by Future

Single by Future

from the album I Never Liked You
- Released: February 11, 2022
- Genre: R&B
- Length: 3:05
- Label: Epic; Freebandz
- Songwriters: Nayvadius Wilburn; Wesley Glass; Taurus Currie, Jr.; Jasper Harris; Russell Chell
- Producers: Wheezy; Taurus; Harris; Russ Chell

Future singles chronology
"M&M" (2021)	"Worst Day" (2022)	"Hold That Heat" (2022)

Music video
- "Worst Day" on YouTube

"Worst Day" is a song by American rapper Future. It was released through Epic Records and Freebandz as a single on February 11, 2022, and is included on the deluxe edition of his ninth studio album I Never Liked You. Future wrote the song with producers Wheezy, Taurus, Jasper Harris, and Russ Chell. A Valentine's Day song that sees Future rap about his hate for the holiday, it was released three days before it. It also serves as his first solo single in almost two years, following the release of "Tycoon", from his eighth studio album, High Off Life (2020).

== Release and promotion ==
On February 8, 2022, Future shared a clip of the accompanying music video of the song with Kevin Samuels, titled "Healing Together with Dr. Kevin Samuels". The following day, he revealed the cover art of the song.

== Composition and lyrics ==
The song has been described as "a little smoother and glossier than most Future singles". On the Valentine's Day song, Future raps about the stress that comes with purchasing gifts for a lot of beautiful women: "Valentine's Day, the worst day, got too many to please".

== Music video ==
The official music video for "Worst Day" premiered alongside the song on February 11, 2022. American YouTuber and dating advisor Kevin Samuels plays Future's therapist, describing himself as a "professional image consultant". At the beginning of the video, Future confesses to Samuels about his addiction to buying many women excess gifts for Valentine's Day. He added that he usually spends "around two to three" on presents, with Samuels assuming that the numbers are referring to thousands, but Future corrects him and says that they are referring to millions. The video sees Future doing exactly that as he is seen with a woman, spoiling her with roses, expensive pieces of jewelry, and other lavish items.

== Credits and personnel ==
Credits adapted from Tidal.

- Future – vocals, songwriting
- Wheezy – production, songwriting
- Taurus – production, songwriting
- Jasper Harris – production, songwriting
- Russ Chell – production, songwriting
- Eric Manco – mixing
- Glenn Schick – mastering

== Charts ==
Chart performance for "Worst Day"
Chart (2022)	Peak position
Canada Hot 100 (Billboard)	59
Global 200 (Billboard)	61
New Zealand Hot Singles (RMNZ)	13
South Africa Streaming (TOSAC)	53
US Billboard Hot 100	34
US Hot R&B/Hip-Hop Songs (Billboard)	12
US Rhythmic Airplay (Billboard)	17

== Release history ==
Release history for "Worst Day"
Region	Date	Format	Label	Ref.
Various	February 11, 2022	Digital download; streaming	Epic; Freebandz	
United States	February 15, 2022	Rhythmic contemporary radio	Epic; Freebandz	
United States	February 15, 2022	Urban contemporary radio	Epic; Freebandz	
