= Love You Better (Future song) =

2022 single by Future

Single by Future

from the album I Never Liked You
- Released: July 26, 2022
- Genre: R&B
- Length: 2:09
- Label: Freebandz; Epic
- Songwriters: Nayvadius Cash; Jacob Canady; Isaac de Boni; Michael Mule; Jayla Darden
- Producers: ATL Jacob; FnZ; Jayla Darden

Future singles chronology
| "Pressurelicious" (2022) | "Love You Better" (2022) | "One Time" (2022) |

Music video
- "Love You Better" on YouTube

"Love You Better" is a song by American rapper Future from his ninth studio album I Never Liked You (2022). It was sent to rhythmic contemporary radio on July 26, 2022, as the fourth single from the album.

== Composition ==
"Love You Better" is a breakup song that contains a "chopped-up" vocal sample and croons from Future, who sings to his former lover, "Hope you can find someone to love you better than I did". Alphonse Pierre of Pitchfork described that in the lyrics, Future "sounds like he's apologizing to a girlfriend but is really trying to manipulate her into feeling sorry for him".

== Critical reception ==
In his Pitchfork review of I Never Liked You, Alphonse Pierre had a mixed reaction to the song, regarding it as the album's best representation of Future's new music sounding just like his older music but not as good as it was before. Pierre commented, "It sounds nice, but I feel indifferent. The heartbreak doesn't have to be real, but it has to feel genuine, and with Future it just doesn't anymore."

== Music video ==
The official music video was released on July 21, 2022. It features Future in clown makeup and feeling sorrow while his ex-partner (played by actress Shannon Thornton) enjoys her life with her new boyfriend. The video begins with a billboard advertising the song and another one featuring a "nondescript" football player referencing NFL player Russell Wilson, who is married to singer Ciara, Future's ex-girlfriend in real life. The couple is seen walking in front of their mansion home and taking photos with their young daughter, and in another scene Future's ex shares her secrets with a group of women.

== Charts ==
=== Weekly charts ===
Weekly chart performance for "Love You Better"
| Chart (2022) | Peak position |
|---|---|
| Canada Hot 100 (Billboard) | 46 |
| Global 200 (Billboard) | 23 |
| South Africa Streaming (TOSAC) | 10 |
| UK Singles (Official Charts) | 100 |
| US Billboard Hot 100 | 12 |
| US Hot R&B/Hip-Hop Songs (Billboard) | 8 |
| US Rhythmic Airplay (Billboard) | 22 |

=== Year-end charts ===
Year-end chart performance for "Love You Better"
| Chart (2023) | Position |
|---|---|
| US Hot R&B/Hip-Hop Songs (Billboard) | 82 |

== Certifications ==
Certifications for "Love You Better"
| Region | Certification | Certified units/sales |
|---|---|---|
| United States (RIAA) | Platinum | 1,000,000^{‡} |
^{‡} Sales+streaming figures based on certification alone.
