= Puffin on Zootiez =

2022 song by Future

Song by Future

from the album I Never Liked You
- Released: April 29, 2022
- Recorded: 2021
- Genre: Hip hop
- Length: 2:52
- Label: Freebandz; Epic
- Songwriters: Nayvadius Wilburn; Nils Noehden; Bryan Simmons; Lesidney Ragland
- Producers: Nils; TM88; Too Dope

Music video
- "Puffin on Zootiez" on YouTube

"Puffin on Zootiez" (stylized in all caps) is a song by American rapper Future from his ninth studio album I Never Liked You (2022). It was produced by Nils, TM88 and Too Dope.

== Composition ==
In the song, Future highlights his rise from poverty to fame, while also criticizing rappers that are copying him and boasting his wealth. He references him using Zootiez, a cannabis brand that he collaborated with to promote his album I Never Liked You.

== Critical reception ==
The song received generally positive reviews from music critics. Michael Di Gennaro of Exclaim! called it the "perhaps the most addicting" and the "smoothest" song on I Never Liked You, describing it as "a gorgeous piece of luxury rap that sounds like it was recorded from the leather seats of the limousine Future sits in on the album's cover." Alphonse Pierre of Pitchfork wrote, "The eeriness of 'Puffin on Zootiez' might make you believe Future is saying more than he actually is, but it's OK because his downbeat yet rapid delivery and the ornate instrumental carry the song." Aron A. HotNewHipHop considered it one of the best songs from the album, also calling it "a perfect pairing of Future's ear for hazy production and stream-of-conscious songwriting" and writing, "Future's vocals are at ease on the record, providing a calmness that sounds like a marriage between several Backwoods and a selection of Better House Fragrances burning in the studio."

== Music video ==
The official music video was released on June 2, 2022. Directed by Nick Walker, it sees Future rapping in hazy spaces, under neon lights of varying colors; the blurry and smoky visuals represent his intoxication. He appears to be loitering in the streets late at night.

== Charts ==
=== Weekly charts ===
Weekly chart performance for "Puffin on Zootiez"
Chart (2022)	Peak position
Australia (ARIA)	84
Canada Hot 100 (Billboard)	26
Global 200 (Billboard)	7
South Africa Streaming (TOSAC)	15
UK Singles (Official Charts)	53
US Billboard Hot 100	4
US Hot R&B/Hip-Hop Songs (Billboard)	3

=== Year-end charts ===
2022 year-end chart performance for "Puffin on Zootiez"
Chart (2022)	Position
US Billboard Hot 100	84
US Hot R&B/Hip-Hop Songs (Billboard)	19

== Certifications ==
Certifications for "Puffin on Zootiez"
Region	Certification	Certified units/sales
Austria (IFPI Austria)	Gold	15,000^{‡}
Canada (Music Canada)	Platinum	80,000^{‡}
United Kingdom (BPI)	Silver	200,000^{‡}
United States (RIAA)	Platinum	1,000,000^{‡}
^{‡} Sales+streaming figures based on certification alone.
