= Future (rapper) =

American rapper (born 1983)

- Future in 2019
- Born: Nayvadius DeMun Wilburn; November 20, 1983 (age 42); Atlanta, Georgia, U.S.
- Other names: Meathead; Future Hendrix; Pluto
- Education: Columbia High School
- Occupations: Rapper; singer; songwriter; record producer
- Years active: 2003–present
- Works: Albums; singles; production; videography
- Children: 7
- Relatives: Rico Wade (cousin)
- Awards: Full list
- Musical career
- Genres: Southern hip-hop; trap; mumble rap
- Labels: Freebandz; Epic; A1 (formerly)
- Formerly of: Dungeon Family
- Website: futurefreebandz.com
- Website: freebandz.com

Nayvadius DeMun Cash (né Wilburn; born November 20, 1983), known professionally as Future, is an American rapper, singer-songwriter, and record producer. Known for his mumble-style, rap-singing and prolific output, Future is credited with helping pioneer the use of Auto-Tuned delivery in trap music. He is commonly regarded as one of the most influential rappers of his generation.

Born and raised in Atlanta, Georgia, Future signed a recording contract with Rocko's A1 Recordings in 2011, which entered a joint venture with Epic Records shortly after. His first two studio albums, Pluto (2012) and Honest (2014), were both met with critical and commercial success, spawning the platinum-certified singles "Turn On the Lights", "Honest", "Move That Dope" (featuring Pharrell Williams and Pusha T), and "I Won" (featuring Kanye West). His subsequent albums have each debuted atop the US Billboard 200; his third and fourth, DS2 (2015) and Evol (2016), were supported by the singles "Where Ya At" (featuring Drake) and "Low Life" (featuring the Weeknd), respectively. Future's eponymous fifth album and its follow-up, Hndrxx (both 2017) made him the first musical act to release two chart-topping projects on the Billboard 200 in consecutive weeks—the former spawned his first Billboard Hot 100-top ten single, "Mask Off."

After departing A1, Future released the albums The Wizrd (2019) and High Off Life (2020)—the latter spawned the diamond-certified single "Life Is Good" (featuring Drake). Future guest appeared alongside Young Thug on Drake's 2021 single "Way 2 Sexy," which became his first number-one song on the Billboard Hot 100 after a record-breaking 125 entries. His ninth album, I Never Liked You (2022) spawned the single "Wait for U" (featuring Drake and Tems), which became his second to peak the chart and first to do so as a lead artist. At the 65th Annual Grammy Awards, the song won Best Melodic Rap Performance, while its parent album received a nomination for Best Rap Album. His two collaborative albums with record producer Metro Boomin—We Don't Trust You and We Still Don't Trust You (both 2024)—continued his string of number-one projects on the Billboard 200; the former spawned his third Billboard Hot 100-number one single and first to remain atop the chart for several weeks: "Like That" (with Metro Boomin and Kendrick Lamar). Future then released Mixtape Pluto (2024), his seventeenth mixtape which caused him to become the first hip-hop artist to have three number one albums in the same year, and in less than six months.

Future has released the mixtapes Beast Mode (with Zaytoven), 56 Nights (with Southside), and What a Time to Be Alive (with Drake) in 2015—the latter spawned the single "Jumpman". He has released the full-length collaborative projects Super Slimey (2017) with Young Thug, Wrld on Drugs (2018) with Juice Wrld, and Pluto x Baby Pluto (2020) with Lil Uzi Vert. Among the best-selling hip-hop musicians, Future's accolades include three Grammy Awards from a total of fifteen nominations. He also holds the record for the most albums at number one on the US Top Rap Albums chart, with 16.

== Early life and education ==
Nayvadius DeMun Wilburn was born on November 20, 1983, in Atlanta, Georgia, the son of Stephanie Jester. He attended Columbia High School in nearby Decatur. At age 16, he was shot in the hand and robbed, an event he regards as a major turning point in his life.

== Career ==
=== Early years ===
Future began his career under the name "Meathead", as a member of the Georgia-based musical collective Dungeon Family. He was led to join the group by his first cousin Rico Wade (1972–2024), who was part of the group's in-house production team Organized Noize and operated the East Point, Georgia "Dungeon" studio which the collective's name was based from. Future performed in a smaller hip-hop group within the collective who went by the name "Da Connect", where he would later be nicknamed "The Future" by group member G-Rock. Da Connect recorded one album, Rico Wade Presents: Da Connect which was slated for commercial release in 2003, but was ultimately shelved. Future had one solo record on the project titled "Belly of da Beast", which is considered to be his first song. He did not use autotune in his early career with Da Connect compared to later in his career. During this time, Future appeared in numerous Dungeon Family music videos, and received his first songwriting credit on the Organized Noize-produced single, "Blueberry Yum Yum" for rapper Ludacris in 2004.

Wade encouraged him to sharpen his writing skills and pursue a career as a rapper, as recording would create temporary respite from street life. Future voices his praise of Wade's musical influence and instruction, calling him the "mastermind" behind his sound. He was thereafter discovered by fellow Atlanta rapper Rocko, who took Future under his wing as a solo artist on his A1 Recordings record label.

=== 2010–2014: Mixtapes, Pluto and Honest ===
From 2010 to early 2011, Future released a series of mixtapes including 1000, Dirty Sprite and True Story. The latter included the single "Tony Montana", in reference to the Scarface film. He gained regional popularity after his songs were played by DJ Esco at Magic City, a strip club in Atlanta deemed "largely responsible for launching the careers of artists." In April 2011, he co-performed with Atlanta rapper YC on his single "Racks", which would become his first hit song and Billboard Hot 100 entry—peaking at number 42. In July of that year, Future and rapper Gucci Mane would release a collaborative mixtape, Free Bricks.

Future signed a major label recording contract with Epic Records in September 2011, days before the release of his next mixtape, Streetz Calling. The mixtape was described by XXL magazine as ranging from "simple and soundly executed boasts" to "futuristic drinking and drugging jams" to "tales of the grind". A Pitchfork review remarked that on the mixtape Future comes "as close as anyone to perfecting this thread of ringtone pop, where singing and rapping are practically the same thing, and conversing 100% through Auto-Tune doesn't mean you still can't talk about how you used to sell drugs. It would almost feel antiquated if Future weren't amassing hits, or if he weren't bringing some subtle new dimensions to the micro-genre."

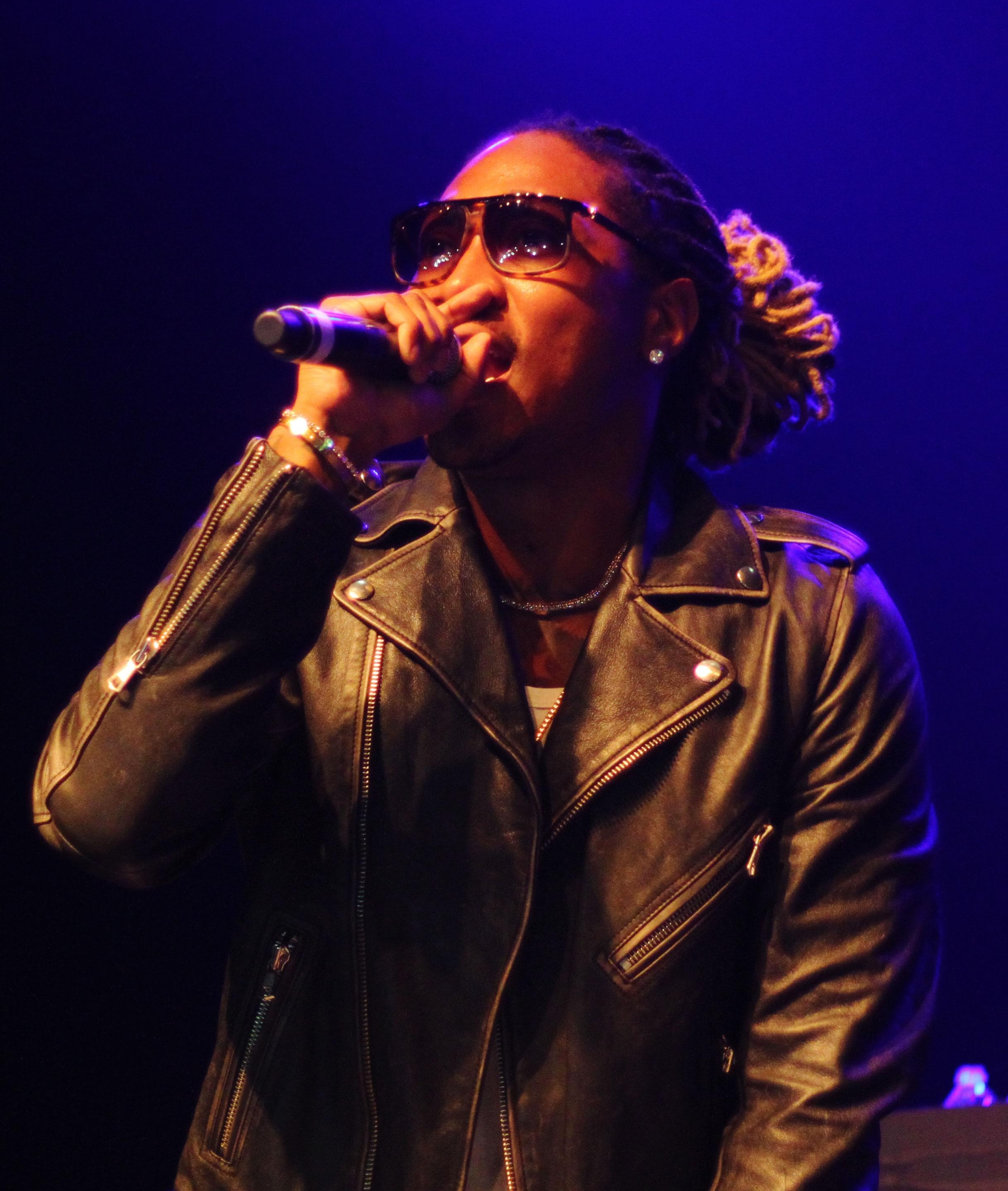
Future performing in 2014

Though Future had told MTV that Streetz Calling would be his final mixtape prior to the release of his debut studio album, another mixtape, Astronaut Status, was released in January 2012. In December 2011, Future was featured on the cover of Issue 77 of The FADER. XXL's Troy Mathews wrote, "While Astronaut Status is up and down and never really hits the highs like 'Racks', 'Tony Montana', and 'Magic' that fans have come to expect from Future, it's apparent that he's poised to continue the buzz of 2011 humming right along into 2012." Future was selected to the annual XXL Freshmen list in early 2012.

His debut album Pluto, originally planned for January 2012, was eventually released on April 17. Its first three singles were mastered re-recordings of pre-existing songs, "Tony Montana", "Go Harder", and "Magic", the latter contained a guest feature from high-profile hometown native, rapper T.I. According to Future, "'Magic' was the first record T.I. jumped on when he came outta jail. Like, he was out of jail a day and he jumped straight on the 'Magic' record without me even knowing about it." The track became Future's first single as a lead artist to enter the Billboard Hot 100 chart, peaking at number 69 in April 2012. In addition, the albums next singles, "Same Damn Time" and "Turn on the Lights" peaked at number 92 and 50 on the Hot 100 respectively, further ushering Future into the mainstream spotlight. The latter was eventually certified platinum by the RIAA and spawned a remix featuring Lil Wayne. Other collaborators on the album include Trae tha Truth, R. Kelly and Snoop Dogg. On October 8, 2012, Future would perform the hook for Pusha T's single "Pain", which preceded his 2013 debut studio album My Name Is My Name.

It was announced that Future would be repackaging his debut album Pluto on November 27, 2012, under the name Pluto 3D, featuring 3 new songs and 2 remix songs, including the remix for "Same Damn Time" featuring Diddy and Ludacris, as well as his single "Neva End (Remix)" featuring Kelly Rowland. In November 2012, Future wrote, produced, and co-performed with Barbadian singer Rihanna on "Loveeeeeee Song", from the singer's seventh studio album, Unapologetic.

On January 15, 2013, Future released the compilation mixtape F.B.G.: The Movie which features the artists signed to his Freebandz label: Young Scooter, Slice9, Casino, Mexico Rann and Maceo. It was certified platinum for having over 250,000 downloads on popular mixtape site DatPiff. Future said of his second studio album Future Hendrix it will be a more substantive musical affair than his debut album and features R&B music along with his usual "street bangers". The album was to be released in 2013. The album featured his then-fiancée Ciara, as well as other high-profile artists including Kanye West, Drake, Kelly Rowland, Wiz Khalifa, and André 3000, among others.

The album's lead single, "Karate Chop" featuring Casino, premiered on January 25, 2013, and was sent to urban radio on January 29, 2013. The song, produced by Atlanta-based producer Metro Boomin, spawned an official remix featuring Lil Wayne, was sent radio and was released on iTunes on February 19, 2013. On August 7, 2013, Future changed the title of his second album from Future Hendrix to Honest and announced that it would be released on November 26, 2013. It was later revealed that the album would be pushed back to April 22, 2014, as it was said that Future has tour dates with Drake on Would You Like A Tour?. Along with "Karate Chop", the album was preceded by the singles "Honest", "Shit", "Move That Dope", featuring Pharrell and Pusha T and "I Won" featuring Kanye West; "Honest" peaked at number 55 on the Hot 100. Upon release, the album was received generally positively and peaked at number 2 on the Billboard 200. During this time, Future also made a slew of guest appearances on hit songs including Lil Wayne's 2013 hit single "Love Me", Rocko's single "U.O.E.N.O." the same year, and DJ Khaled's 2014 single "Hold You Down". The former became his first top-10 entry on the Hot 100 and received diamond certification from the RIAA.

=== 2015–2017: DS2, Evol, Future, and Hndrxx ===
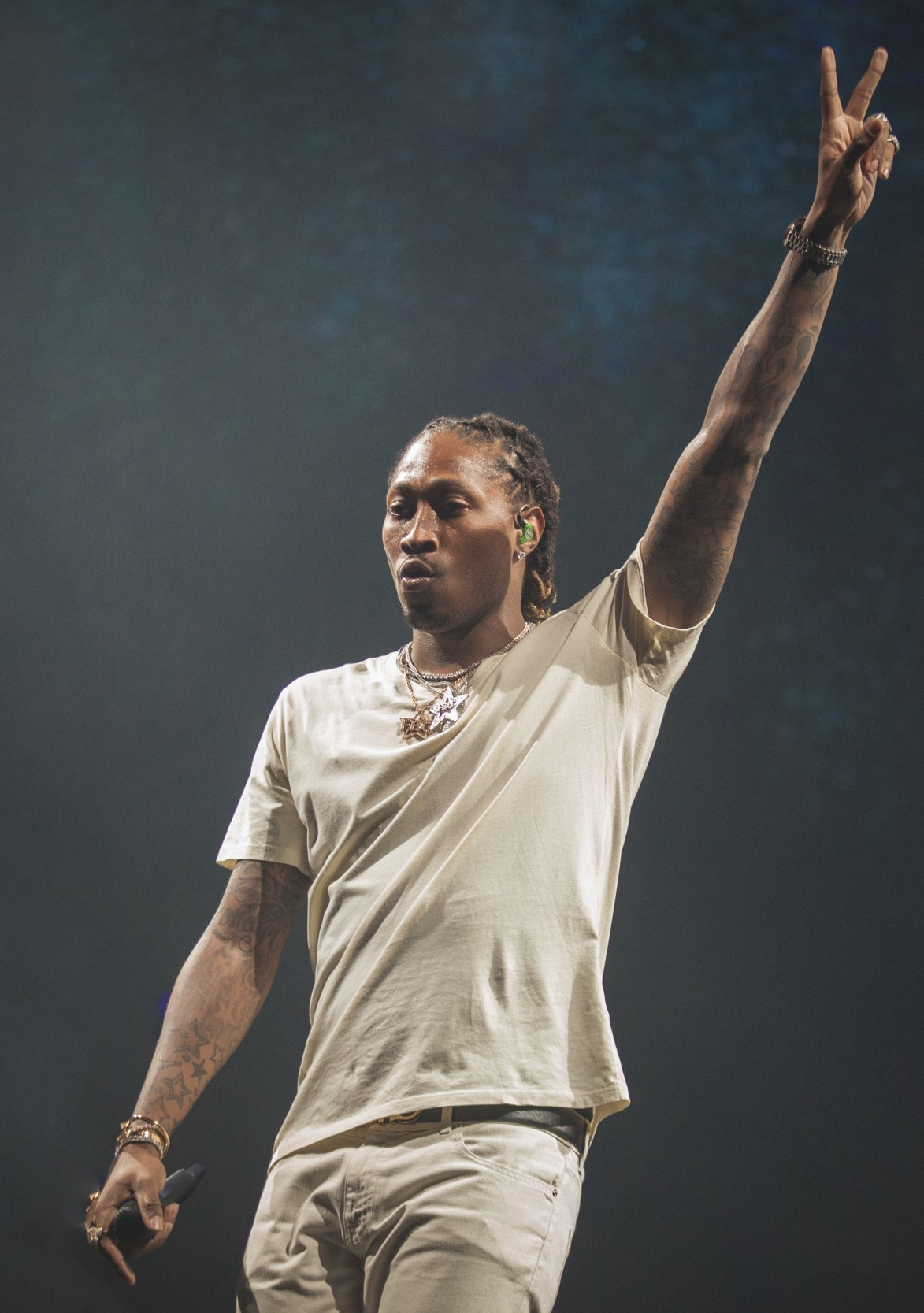
Future performing on the Summer Sixteen tour in 2016

Future released DS2 on July 17, 2015. On September 20, 2015, Future released a collaborative mixtape with Canadian rapper Drake, titled What a Time to Be Alive. The album debuted at number one on the Billboard 200, Billboard R&B Charts, and Billboard Hot Rap Songs, marking the first time a rapper was able to score two number one albums in a year, in 11 years, since Jay Z back in 2004. The mixtape has sold over 334,000 copies in the U.S. On January 17, 2016, Future released another mixtape, titled Purple Reign, with executive production from Metro Boomin and DJ Esco, as well as beat credits from Southside, Zaytoven and more. On February 5, 2016, Future premiered his fourth studio album, EVOL, on DJ Khaled's debut episode of the Beats 1 radio show We The Best. In 2016, Future became the fastest artist to chart three number-one albums on the Billboard 200 since Glee soundtrack albums in 2010.

On June 29, 2016, he appeared in an issue of Rolling Stone. On Valentine's Day 2017, Future announced via Instagram that his self-titled fifth studio album would be released on February 17, 2017. Exactly one week later, he would release his sixth studio album titled Hndrxx. Both albums went number one consecutively, which made Future the first artist to debut two albums at number one at the same time on the Billboard 200 and Canadian Albums Chart. On October 20, 2017, he alongside Young Thug would drop their collaboration mixtape called Super Slimey. He, along with Ed Sheeran, collaborated with singer-songwriter Taylor Swift on the song "End Game" from her album Reputation. The song peaked at number 18 on the Billboard Hot 100 and was Future's eighth top 20 hit.

=== 2018–2019: Superfly, Wrld on Drugs, and The Wizrd ===
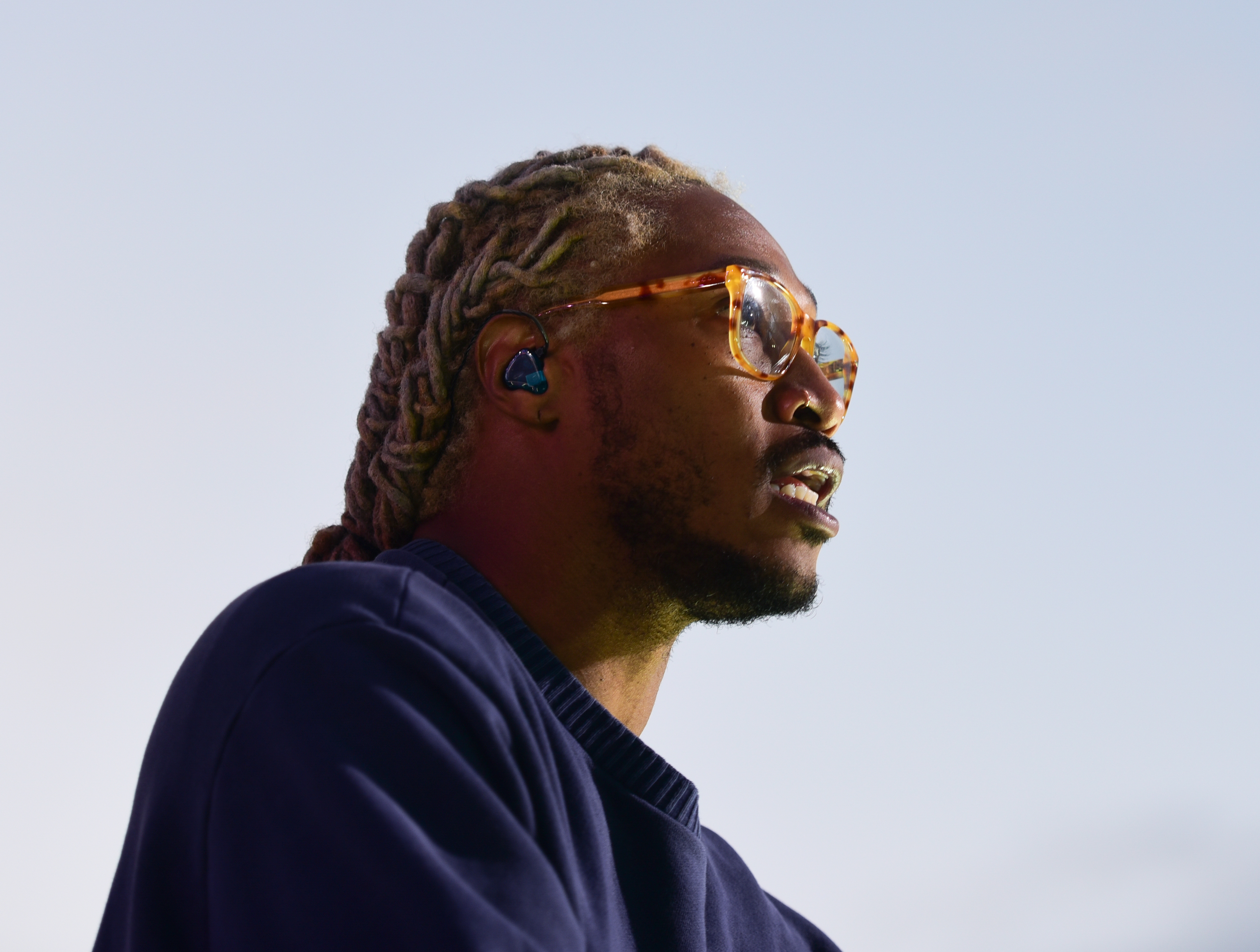
Future in 2019

On January 11, 2018, Future collaborated alongside Kendrick Lamar, James Blake and Jay Rock for the song, "King's Dead", from the soundtrack album of the Marvel Studios superhero film Black Panther and Jay Rock's third studio album Redemption. At the 61st Annual Grammy Awards, the song earned two Grammy nominations, for Best Rap Performance and Best Rap Song, marking Future's first career Grammy nominations. Future curated the soundtrack for the movie Superfly, which was released in June 2018. On October 19, 2018, Future released Wrld On Drugs, a collaborative mixtape with fellow American rapper Juice Wrld. Wrld on Drugs debuted at number two on the US Billboard 200 behind A Star Is Born by Lady Gaga and Bradley Cooper, with 98,000 album-equivalent units, which included 8,000 pure album sales. It became Future's tenth top-ten album in the United States, and Juice Wrld's second.

On January 18, 2019, Future released his seventh studio album, Future Hndrxx Presents: The Wizrd. The album consists of 20 songs and was promoted by a film titled The Wizrd, released on January 11 on Apple Music. The Wizrd received generally positive reviews from critics and became Future's sixth US number-one album, debuting at number one on the US Billboard 200 with 125,000 album-equivalent units (including 15,000 pure album sales). With the release of The Wizrd, several songs from the album charted on the Billboard Hot 100, leading to Future becoming the artist with the 10th most entries in Hot 100 history. At the 61st Annual Grammy Awards held on February 10, 2019, Future won his first Grammy Award for Best Rap Performance for his collaboration alongside Jay Rock, Kendrick Lamar and James Blake for the song, "King's Dead", from the soundtrack album of the Marvel Studios superhero film Black Panther. On June 7, 2019, Future released his second project of the year, his debut solo EP titled Save Me. Save Me received mixed reviews from music critics and debuted at number 5 on the US Billboard 200.

=== 2020–2021: High Off Life and Pluto x Baby Pluto ===
On January 10, 2020, Future released the third single for his then upcoming seventh studio album: "Life Is Good", which features Drake; the song peaked at number two on the Billboard Hot 100, and eventually was the highest charting song off the album. On February 15, 2020, Future released an official remix of his song "Life Is Good", the remix kept Drake’s feature—and added new verses from DaBaby and Lil Baby. On May 1, 2020, Future guest appeared on Drake’s sixth mixtape Dark Lane Demo Tapes; on the mixtape—Future appeared on the tracks "Desires", and "D4L" alongside Young Thug. Both tracks charted within the top-30 of the Billboard Hot 100. On April 1, 2020, Future released the fourth single for his then upcoming album, "Tycoon"—the song debuted and peaked at number 76 on the Billboard Hot 100 chart.

Later that month (April), Future announced his eighth studio album, at the time titled Life Is Good; The title was later changed to High Off Life and the album was released on May 15, 2020. The album became Future’s seventh consecutive number one album, debuting at number one on the US Billboard 200 chart with 153,000 album-equivalent units in its first week. The album sales week also became Future’s largest week since 2015, when his third album DS2 debuted atop the chart with 151,000 album-equivalent units. On May 26, 2020, Future released the ninth track from High Off Life as a single, becoming the album's fifth and final single—the track being "Trillionaire", which features YoungBoy Never Broke Again.

On July 21, 2020, Future and fellow rapper Lil Uzi Vert both deleted all posts on their Instagram pages respectively and proceeded to upload a visual teaser directed by Hype Williams, intending to announce an at-the-time upcoming album titled Pluto x Baby Pluto. Later that month, on July 31—which is Uzi’s birthday, Future and Uzi both released the collaborative singles "Patek" and "Over Your Head", both singles would later appear on the deluxe edition of Pluto x Baby Pluto. On November 13, 2020, after extensive promotion—Future and Lil Uzi Vert released their collaborative album Pluto x Baby Pluto, which was both artists' second project of the year; the album debuted and peaked at number two on the US Billboard 200 with 105,000 album-equivalent units. The album was blocked from the number-one spot by AC/DC’s album Power Up—which debuted atop with around 12,000 more units (117,000 units).

Throughout 2020, Future guest appeared on many songs, all of which either performed well on music charts, or didn’t chart. Future was featured on "Big Drip" by Ufo361 on January 17, 2020—"Dead Man Walking" by 2 Chainz also on January 17, 2020—"1st n 3rd" alongside Lil Baby by Marlo on January 23, 2020—"Happiness Over Everything (H.O.E.)" alongside Miguel by Jhené Aiko on February 26, 2020—"What It Was" by Lil Gotit on June 26, 2020—"Rari" by Octavian on July 27, 2020—"Thrusting" alongside Swae Lee by Internet Money on August 21, 2020—"Gucci Bucket Hat" with Pap Chanel featuring Herion Young on October 20, 2020—and many other features.

On March 26, 2021, Future collaborated with rapper Moneybagg Yo to release the single "Hard for the Next", which became the second single from Moneybagg Yo's fourth studio album: A Gangsta's Pain. On May 28, 2021, Future collaborated with Hotboii to release the non-album single "Nobody Special." On September 24, 2021, Future collaborated with rapper Gunna to release the single "Too Easy", which happened to be the lead single from Gunna's at-the-time upcoming third studio album: DS4Ever; the song charted in the top-twenty of the US Billboard Hot 100 chart. On December 15, 2021, Future collaborated with rapper Rvssian to release the non-album single "M&M", which also features vocals from Lil Baby. Throughout 2021, Future appeared on many songs as a featured artist, most notably—he broke the record for the most Billboard Hot 100 entries (125) until a number-one song was captured, he earned his first number-one with his feature alongside Young Thug on Drake's single "Way 2 Sexy", which debuted in the Hot 100's number one position.

=== 2022–2025: I Never Liked You, We Don't Trust You, We Still Don't Trust You, and Mixtape Pluto ===
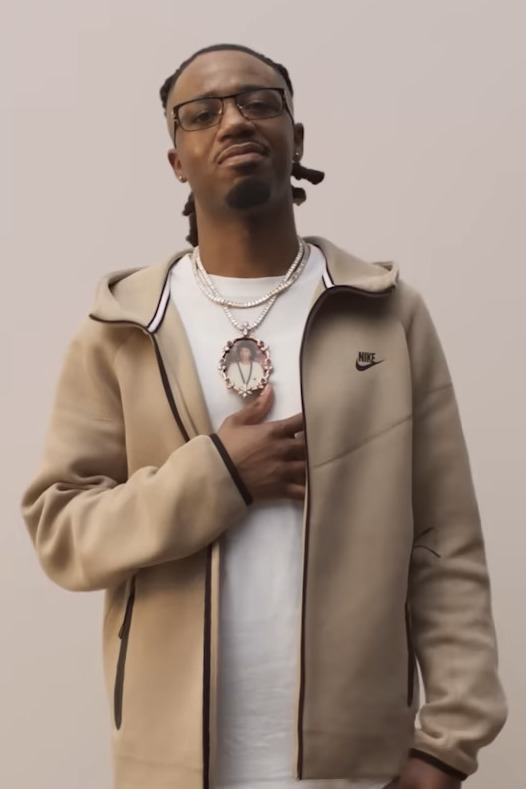
Metro Boomin, Future's frequent collaborator, in 2023

On February 11, 2022, Future released his first solo single in over a year, "Worst Day", which happened to appear on the deluxe edition of his at-the-time upcoming ninth studio album. On April 20, 2022, Future was named the "best rapper alive" by GQ. Then on April 22, 2022, Future and record producer Southside released the collaborative single "Hold That Heat", which features rapper Travis Scott. On April 29, 2022, Future released his ninth studio album I Never Liked You after it was previously announced earlier that month. The album was a commercial success, becoming his eighth number one album and debuting atop the Billboard 200 chart—moving 222,000 album-equivalent units in its first week, becoming Future's largest sales week by album-equivalent units.

I Never Liked You notably spawned four simultaneous top-ten entries on the Billboard Hot 100: "Wait For U" featuring Drake and Tems (at No. 1), "Puffin On Zootiez" (at No. 4), "712PM" (at No. 8), and "I'm Dat Nigga" (at No. 10). All sixteen tracks from the album debuted on the Hot 100; as well as two additional tracks charted by Future, causing him to have 18 simultaneous entries that week. On May 3, 2022, Future released the seventh track from his ninth studio album I Never Liked You as a single, "Wait for U", which features Drake and Tems—the track previously became Future's second number one single on the Billboard Hot 100, Drake's tenth, and Tems' first. On May 6, 2022, Future released "Keep It Burnin", the third track from I Never Liked You as a single, the track features vocals from Kanye West.

Future released We Don't Trust You, a collaborative album with Metro Boomin, on March 22, 2024. The duo then released the sequel album, We Still Don't Trust You, exactly three weeks later on April 12, 2024. On September 2, 2024, he confirmed the release of his seventeenth mixtape Mixtape Pluto.

In early 2025, Future featured on the song "Fxck Up the World" from the album Alter Ego, the first solo studio album by Thai rapper Lisa. On March 28, 2025, longtime Freebandz affiliate and best friend of Future, Young Scooter, was killed in Atlanta, Georgia, leading Future to take a break from recording.

=== 2026–present: The Real Me ===
In March 2026, Future confirmed that his tenth solo studio album was on the way after having previously teased it throughout January and February. Alongside the announcement, he debuted a new song, "Ready to Slide", during a live performance, which is anticipated to appear on the album. In May 2026, it was announced that Future would perform at the opening ceremony of the 2026 FIFA World Cup game in the United States, where the US plays Paraguay, at SoFi Stadium in Inglewood, California.

The Real Me was released on July 10, 2026; Future's first solo studio album in four years.

== Musical style ==
Future's music has been characterized as trap music. Future makes prevalent use of Auto-Tune in his songs, both rapping and singing with the effect. In 2013, Pitchfork wrote that Future "miraculously shows that it's still possible for Auto-Tune to be an interesting artistic tool", stating that he "finds a multitude of ways for the software to accentuate and color emotion". The LA Times wrote in 2016 that "Future's highly processed vocals suggest a man driven to bleary desperation by drugs or love or technology", stating that his music "comes closest to conjuring the numbing overstimulation of our time". GQ stated in 2014 that he "has managed to reboot the tired auto-tune sound and mash it into something entirely new", writing that he "combines it with a bizarro croon to synthesize how he feels, then [...] stretches and deteriorates his words until they're less like words, more like raw energy and reactive emotions". Critic Simon Reynolds wrote in 2018 that "he's reinvented blues for the 21st century."

American singer and rapper T-Pain, who also uses that audio processor, criticized Future's unconventional use of it in 2014. In response, Future stated in an interview that "when I first used Auto-Tune, I never used it to sing. I wasn't using it the way T-Pain was. I used it to rap because it makes my voice sound grittier. Now everybody wants to rap in Auto-Tune. Future's not everybody." Due to the sustained contemporary popularity of his musical style, he is commonly regarded as one of the most influential rappers of his generation.

== Personal life ==
Future is the unmarried father of seven children by his account, each with different women, although another child's paternity has been litigated. His offspring are:

- Jakobi (born June 2002), son with Jessica Smith
- Londyn (born 2009), daughter with India J; Future adopted her son Jaiden
- Prince (born in 2013), son with entrepreneur and influencer Brittni Mealy
- Future Zahir (born May 2014), son with singer/dancer Ciara
- Hendrix (born December 2018), son with influencer Joie Chavis
- Paris, daughter
- Kash, son

In October 2013, Future was engaged to Ciara, the mother of one of his sons, but she ended the engagement in August 2014 due to his infidelity. In 2016, Future was sued by both Jessica Smith and Ciara. Smith sued him for failing to pay child support, stating their son "suffers from emotional and behavioral issues stemming from Future's neglect as a father", while Ciara sued him for defamation, slander, and libel. In October 2016, a judge said that Future's string of tweets bashing Ciara did not relate to the $15 million she was demanding. In 2019, a mother from Florida and another from Texas filed paternity suits, claiming that Future was the father of their respective daughter and son. In 2020, the Texas woman Cindy Parker dropped her paternity suit, even though she and another woman had their children DNA tested with results showing 99% likelihood the children were half-siblings.

In 2026, Future became involved in a legal dispute with his former partner Brittni Mealy over their son, Prince. Mealy claimed that Future had not seen their son in more than a year and had not been involved in important parts of his life. She also accused him of failing to obtain a $500,000 life insurance policy for their son Prince as required by a previous court order, while Future has only denied the claims and said he obtained the policy. This dispute between the two later continued in court, with Future beginning to accuse Mealy of leaking information about their case to the press.

== Discography ==
=== Studio albums ===
- Pluto (2012) (reissued as Pluto 3D)
- Honest (2014)
- DS2 (2015)
- Evol (2016)
- Future (2017)
- Hndrxx (2017)
- The Wizrd (2019)
- High Off Life (2020)
- I Never Liked You (2022)
- The Real Me (2026)
- Infinity (TBA)

=== Collaborative albums ===
- Pluto × Baby Pluto (with Lil Uzi Vert) (2020)
- We Don't Trust You (with Metro Boomin) (2024)
- We Still Don't Trust You (with Metro Boomin) (2024)

== Tours ==
=== Headlining ===
- Pluto Tour (2012)
- Honest Tour (2014)
- Purple Reign Tour (2016)
- Nobody Safe Tour (2017)
- Future Hndrxx Tour (2017)
- Future and Friends: One Big Party Tour (2023)

=== Supporting / Co–headlining ===
- America's Most Wanted Tour (with Lil Wayne) (2013)
- Would You Like a Tour? (with Drake) (2013)
- Jungle Tour (with Drake) (2015)
- Summer Sixteen Tour (with Drake) (2016)
- Legendary Nights Tour (with Meek Mill) (2019)
- We Trust You Tour (with Metro Boomin) (2024)
