= Future singles discography =

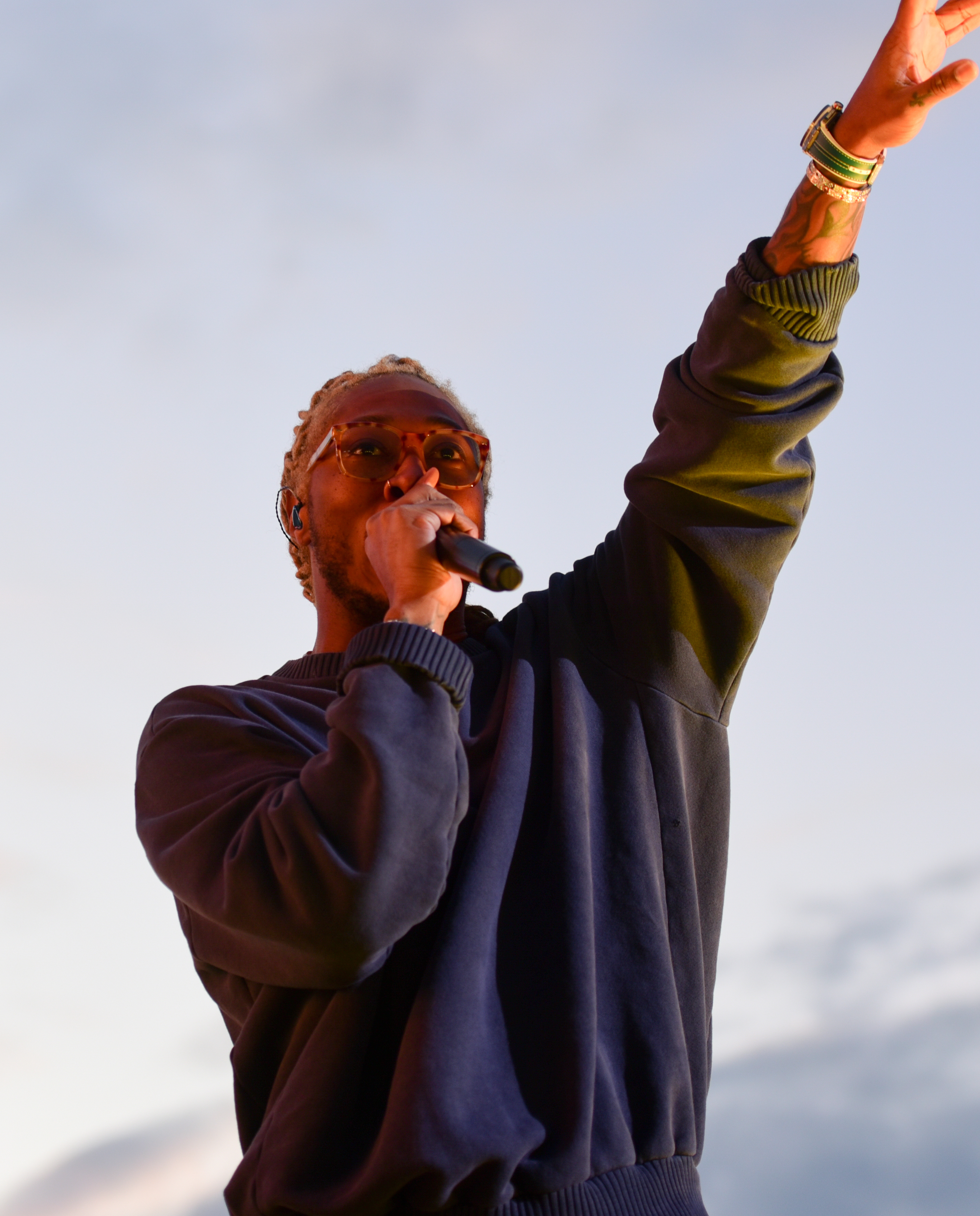
- Future pictured in 2019
- As lead artist: 71
- As featured artist: 105
- Promotional singles: 8
- Other charted and certified songs: 254

American rapper Future has released 71 singles as a lead artist, 105 singles as a featured artist, 8 promotional singles, and has garnered 254 non-single songs to chart or receive a music certification. Future's digital singles have achieved 161.5 million certified units according to the Recording Industry Association Of America (RIAA) as of July 2026, the certified units are based on sales and on-demand streaming. On the US Billboard Hot 100 as of November 2024, Future has charted 217 songs on the chart—the third most in the charts history just after Taylor Swift and Drake; Also on the US Billboard Hot 100, Future has also garnered 73 top-40 charting songs, 15 top-10 charting songs, and 3 number-one songs.

== As lead artist ==
=== 2010s ===
List of singles as lead artist, with selected chart positions and certifications, showing year released and album name
Title	Year	Peak chart positions										Certifications	Album
Title	Year	US	US R&B /HH	US Rap	AUS	CAN	FRA	IRE	NZ	SWE	UK	Certifications	Album
"Tony Montana" (solo or featuring Drake)	2011	— (Note: "Tony Montana" did not enter the Billboard Hot 100, but peaked at number four on the Bubbling Under Hot 100 Singles chart.)	22	18	—	—	—	—	—	—	—	RIAA: Gold	Pluto
"Go Harder"	2011	—	65	—	—	—	—	—	—	—	—		Pluto
"Magic" (featuring T.I.)	2012	69	10	13	—	—	—	—	—	—	—	RIAA: Gold	Pluto
"Same Damn Time"	2012	92	12	16	—	—	—	—	—	—	—	RIAA: Gold	Pluto
"Turn On the Lights"	2012	50	2	4	—	—	—	—	—	—	—	RIAA: 3× Platinum	Pluto
"Neva End" (featuring Kelly Rowland)	2012	52	14	11	—	—	—	—	—	—	—	RIAA: 2× Platinum	Pluto
"Karate Chop" (featuring Lil Wayne)	2013	82	27	19	—	—	—	—	—	—	—	RIAA: Gold	Honest
"Honest"	2013	55	18	15	—	—	—	—	—	—	—	RIAA: 2× Platinum	Honest
"Shit"	2013	— (Note: "Shit" did not enter the Billboard Hot 100, but peaked at number 17 on the Bubbling Under Hot 100 Singles chart.)	34	—	—	—	—	—	—	—	—	RIAA: Gold	Honest
"Real and True" (with Miley Cyrus featuring Mr. Hudson)	2013	— (Note: "Real and True" did not enter the Billboard Hot 100, but peaked at number three on the Bubbling Under Hot 100 Singles chart.)	32	—	—	—	—	—	—	—	92	RIAA: Gold	Non-album single
"Move That Dope" (featuring Pharrell Williams, Pusha T, and Casino)	2014	46	11	5	—	—	—	—	—	—	—	RIAA: Platinum	Honest
"I Won" (featuring Kanye West)	2014	98	26	15	—	—	—	—	— (Note: "I Won" did not enter the NZ Top 40 Singles Chart, but peaked at number five on the NZ Heatseekers chart.)	—	169	RIAA: Platinum	Honest
"Fuck Up Some Commas" (Note: "Fuck Up Some Commas" originally appeared on the mixtape, Monster, but was later released as the lead single from DS2.)	2015	55	14	11	—	—	—	—	—	—	—	RIAA: 5× Platinum; MC: Platinum; RMNZ: Gold	DS2
"Where Ya At" (featuring Drake)	2015	28	11	7	—	62	188	—	—	—	—	RIAA: 6× Platinum; ARIA: Gold; MC: Gold; RMNZ: Gold	DS2
"March Madness"	2015	— (Note: "March Madness" did not enter the Billboard Hot 100, but peaked at number eight on the Bubbling Under Hot 100 Singles chart.)	35	—	—	—	—	—	—	—	—	RIAA: 6× Platinum; MC: Gold	56 Nights
"Jumpman" (with Drake)	2015	12	3	2	47	44	90	77	— (Note: "Jumpman" did not enter the NZ Top 40 Singles Chart, but peaked at number four on the NZ Heatseekers chart.)	— (Note: "Jumpman" did not enter the Swedish Singellista Chart, but peaked at number four on the Swedish Heatseeker Chart.)	58	RIAA: 5× Platinum; ARIA: 3× Platinum; BPI: Platinum; MC: Gold; RMNZ: 2× Platinum	What a Time to Be Alive
"Stick Talk"	2015	91	32	—	—	—	—	—	—	—	—	RIAA: 6× Platinum	DS2
"Low Life" (featuring the Weeknd)	2016	18	6	3	96	25	77	—	30	— (Note: "Low Life" did not enter the Swedish Singellista Chart, but peaked at number one on the Swedish Heatseeker Chart.)	—	RIAA: Diamond (13× Platinum); ARIA: Platinum; BPI: Platinum; GLF: Platinum; MC: 2× Platinum; RMNZ: 2× Platinum; SNEP: Platinum	Evol
"Wicked" (Note: "Wicked" originally appeared on the mixtape, Purple Reign, but was later made available as a bonus track on streaming editions of Evol. It was then released via digital download as the second single.)	2016	41	13	8	—	—	—	—	—	—	—	RIAA: 2× Platinum	Evol
"Used to This" (featuring Drake)	2016	14	5	4	—	17	139	—	— (Note: "Used to This" did not enter the NZ Top 40 Singles Chart, but peaked at number six on the NZ Heatseekers chart.)	—	67	RIAA: 3× Platinum; BPI: Silver; MC: Gold	Future
"Draco"	2017	46	17	11	—	62	—	—	—	—	—	RIAA: 2× Platinum	Future
"Selfish" (featuring Rihanna)	2017	37	15	—	37	28	33	78	17	80	94	RIAA: Platinum; ARIA: Platinum; GLF: Gold; MC: Platinum; RMNZ: 2× Platinum	Hndrxx
"Mask Off"	2017	5	3	2	13	5	2	22	6	8	22	RIAA: Diamond (14× Platinum); ARIA: 3× Platinum; BPI: 2× Platinum; GLF: 3× Platinum; MC: 5× Platinum; RMNZ: 6× Platinum; SNEP: Diamond	Future
"Pie" (featuring Chris Brown)	2017	— (Note: "Pie" did not enter the Billboard Hot 100, but peaked at number two on the Bubbling Under Hot 100 Singles chart.)	48	—	—	78	—	—	—	—	92	RIAA: Gold; MC: Gold; RMNZ: Platinum	Hndrxx
"Extra Luv" (featuring YG)	2017	99	42	—	—	85	—	—	—	—	—	RMNZ: Gold	Future
"Incredible"	2017	— (Note: "Incredible" did not enter the Billboard Hot 100, but peaked at number 11 on the Bubbling Under Hot 100 Singles chart.)	48	—	—	—	—	—	—	—	—	RIAA: Platinum; MC: Gold	Hndrxx
"You da Baddest" (featuring Nicki Minaj)	2017	38	19	14	—	53	95	—	—	—	—	RIAA: Platinum; MC: Gold	Hndrxx
"Patek Water" (with Young Thug featuring Offset)	2017	50	17	12	—	39	171	—	—	—	89	RIAA: Platinum	Super Slimey
"Bum Bum Tam Tam" (Remix) (with MC Fioti, J Balvin, Stefflon Don, and Juan Magán)	2017	—	—	—	—	—	6	—	—	—	—	BPI: Silver; SNEP: Diamond	Non-album single
"King's Dead" (with Jay Rock, Kendrick Lamar, and James Blake)	2018	21	13	10	58	23	—	51	— (Note: "King's Dead" did not enter the NZ Top 40 Singles Chart, but peaked at number four on the NZ Heatseeker Singles Chart.)	— (Note: "King's Dead" did not enter the Swedish Singellista Chart, but peaked at number one on the Swedish Heatseeker Chart.)	50	RIAA: 3× Platinum; BPI: Gold; MC: 2× Platinum; RMNZ: 2× Platinum	Black Panther: The Album
"No Shame"	2018	—	—	—	—	—	—	—	—	—	—		Superfly: Original Motion Picture Soundtrack
"Fine China" (with Juice Wrld)	2018	26	14	13	85	24	—	54	— (Note: "Fine China" did not enter the NZ Top 40 Singles Chart, but peaked at number nine on the NZ Hot Singles Chart.)	54	55	RIAA: 4× Platinum; BPI: Silver; MC: 2× Platinum; RMNZ: Platinum	Wrld on Drugs
"Crushed Up"	2019	43	18	15	—	41	—	—	— (Note: "Crushed Up" did not enter the NZ Top 40 Singles Chart, but peaked at number 13 on the NZ Hot Singles Chart.)	—	81	RIAA: Platinum; MC: Gold	The Wizrd
"Jumpin on a Jet"	2019	57	26	22	—	84	—	—	— (Note: "Jumpin on a Jet" did not enter the NZ Top 40 Singles Chart, but peaked at number 22 on the NZ Hot Singles Chart.)	—	—	RIAA: Gold	The Wizrd
"First Off" (featuring Travis Scott)	2019	47	24	20	—	39	—	—	— (Note: "First Off" did not enter the NZ Top 40 Singles Chart, but peaked at number 14 on the NZ Hot Singles Chart.)	—	78	RIAA: Platinum; MC: Gold	The Wizrd
"Out the Mud" (with Lil Baby)	2019	70	24	20	—	—	—	—	— (Note: "Out the Mud" did not enter the NZ Top 40 Singles Chart, but peaked at number 30 on the NZ Hot Singles Chart.)	—	—	RIAA: Platinum	Non-album single
"100 Shooters" (featuring Meek Mill and Doe Boy)	2019	— (Note: "100 Shooters" did not enter the Billboard Hot 100, but peaked at number one on the Bubbling Under Hot 100 Singles chart.)	39	—	—	—	—	—	—	—	—	RIAA: Platinum	High Off Life
"Undefeated" (featuring Lil Keed)	2019	—	—	—	—	—	—	—	—	—	—		Non-album single
"Last Name" (featuring Lil Durk)	2019	— (Note: "Last Name" did not enter the Billboard Hot 100, but peaked at number two on the Bubbling Under Hot 100 Singles chart.)	— (Note: "Last Name" did not enter the Hot R&B/Hip-Hop Songs chart, but peaked at number one on the Bubbling Under R&B/Hip-Hop Singles chart.)	—	—	—	—	—	—	—	—	RIAA: Platinum	High Off Life
"—" denotes a recording that did not chart or was not released in that territory.

=== 2020s ===
List of singles as lead artist, with selected chart positions and certifications, showing year released and album name
Title	Year	Peak chart positions										Certifications	Album
Title	Year	US	US R&B /HH	US Rap	AUS	CAN	FRA	IRE	NZ	SWE	UK	Certifications	Album
"Life Is Good" (featuring Drake)	2020	2	2	2	11	3	33	5	13	23	3	RIAA: Diamond (15× Platinum); ARIA: 2× Platinum; BPI: Platinum; GLF: Platinum; RMNZ: 3× Platinum; SNEP: Diamond	High Off Life
"Tycoon"	2020	76	37	—	—	—	—	—	— (Note: "Tycoon" did not enter the NZ Top 40 Singles Chart, but peaked at number 32 on the NZ Hot Singles Chart.)	—	—		High Off Life
"Trillionaire" (featuring YoungBoy Never Broke Again)	2020	34	16	14	—	69	—	—	— (Note: "Trillionaire" did not enter the NZ Top 40 Singles Chart, but peaked at number 19 on the NZ Hot Singles Chart.)	—	85	RIAA: Platinum	High Off Life
"Over Your Head" (with Lil Uzi Vert)	2020	— (Note: "Over Your Head" did not enter the Billboard Hot 100, but peaked at number one on the Bubbling Under Hot 100 chart.)	41	—	—	91	—	—	— (Note: "Over Your Head" did not enter the NZ Top 40 Singles Chart, but peaked at number seven on the NZ Hot Singles Chart.)	—	—		Pluto x Baby Pluto (Deluxe)
"Patek" (with Lil Uzi Vert)	2020	— (Note: "Patek" did not enter the Billboard Hot 100, but peaked at number two on the Bubbling Under Hot 100 chart.)	43	—	—	—	—	—	— (Note: "Patek" did not enter the NZ Top 40 Singles Chart, but peaked at number 20 on the NZ Hot Singles Chart.)	—	—		Pluto x Baby Pluto (Deluxe)
"Gucci Bucket Hat" (with Pap Chanel featuring Herion Young)	2020	—	—	—	—	—	—	—	—	—	—		Non-album single
"Hard for the Next" (with Moneybagg Yo)	2021	49	25	18	—	—	—	—	— (Note: "Hard for the Next" did not enter the NZ Top 40 Singles Chart, but peaked at number 40 on the NZ Hot Singles Chart.)	—	—	RIAA: Platinum	A Gangsta's Pain
"Nobody Special" (with Hotboii)	2021	—	—	—	—	—	—	—	— (Note: "Nobody Special" did not enter the NZ Top 40 Singles Chart, but peaked at number 31 on the NZ Hot Singles Chart.)	—	—		Non-album singles
"Too Easy" (with Gunna)	2021	16	6	4	—	43	—	76	— (Note: "Too Easy" did not enter the NZ Top 40 Singles Chart, but peaked at number 12 on the NZ Hot Singles Chart.)	—	43	RIAA: Platinum	DS4Ever
"M&M" (with Rvssian featuring Lil Baby)	2021	—	—	—	—	—	—	—	—	—	—		Non-album single
"Worst Day"	2022	34	12	9	—	59	—	—	— (Note: "Worst Day" did not enter the NZ Top 40 Singles Chart, but peaked at number 13 on the NZ Hot Singles Chart.)	—	—	RIAA: Platinum	I Never Liked You
"Hold That Heat" (with Southside featuring Travis Scott)	2022	57	16	13	—	43	—	—	— (Note: "Hold That Heat" did not enter the NZ Top 40 Singles Chart, but peaked at number nine on the NZ Hot Singles Chart.)	—	—		Non-album single
"Wait for U" (featuring Drake and Tems)	2022	1	1	1	12	3	135	21	7	— (Note: "Wait for U" did not enter the Swedish Singellista Chart, but peaked at number one on the Swedish Heatseeker Chart.)	8	RIAA: Diamond (11× Platinum); ARIA: 2× Platinum; MC: 2× Platinum; IFPI DEN: Gold; SNEP: Gold; BPI: Platinum; RMNZ: 4× Platinum	I Never Liked You
"Keep It Burnin" (featuring Kanye West)	2022	15	10	9	—	33	—	—	—	—	—		I Never Liked You
"712PM"	2022	8	5	5	—	27	—	—	— (Note: "712PM" did not enter the NZ Top 40 Singles Chart, but peaked at number 11 on the NZ Hot Singles Chart.)	—	—	RIAA: 2× Platinum	I Never Liked You
"Love You Better"	2022	12	8	8	—	46	—	—	—	—	100	RIAA: 2× Platinum	I Never Liked You
"Good on Love" (with Lil Double 0)	2022	—	—	—	—	—	—	—	—	—	—		Walk Down World
"Superhero (Heroes & Villains)" (with Metro Boomin and Chris Brown)	2023	8	2	1	30	7	94	22	29	— (Note: "Superhero (Heroes & Villains)" did not enter the Swedish Singellista Chart, but peaked at number six on the Sweden Heatseeker Chart.)	34	RIAA: 2× Platinum; ARIA: 3× Platinum; MC: 2× Platinum; BPI: Gold; SNEP: Gold; RMNZ: Platinum	Heroes & Villains
"Mbappé" (Remix) (with Eladio Carrión)	2023	—	—	—	—	—	—	—	—	—	—		3men2 Kbrn
"Blackout" (with Joyner Lucas)	2023	—	—	—	—	—	—	—	—	—	—		Non-album single
"Favorite Song" (Toxic Version) (with Toosii)	2023	—	—	—	—	—	—	—	—	—	—		Naujour
"Turn Yo Clic Up" (with Quavo)	2023	83	24	16	—	—	—	—	— (Note: "Turn Yo Clic Up" did not enter the NZ Top 40 Singles Chart, but peaked at number 31 on the NZ Hot Singles Chart.)	—	—		Rocket Power
"Supposed to Be Loved" (with DJ Khaled and Lil Baby featuring Lil Uzi Vert)	2023	52	15	13	—	—	—	—	— (Note: "Supposed to Be Loved" did not enter the NZ Top 40 Singles Chart, but peaked at number 15 on the NZ Hot Singles Chart.)	—	—		Til Next Time
"Hard to Handle" (with Young Scooter)	2023	—	—	—	—	—	—	—	—	—	—		Streets Krazy
"What's the Move?" (with the Kid Laroi and BabyDrill)	2023	—	—	—	—	—	—	—	—	—	—		The First Time
"Arabi" (with Massari and Mohamed Ramadan)	2024	—	—	—	—	—	—	—	—	—	—		Non-album single
"Type Shit" (with Metro Boomin, Travis Scott, and Playboi Carti)	2024	2	2	2	29	8	91	26	23	91	18	RIAA: 4× Platium; ARIA: Gold; BPI: Gold; MC: 2× Platinum; RMNZ: Platinum	We Don't Trust You
"Young Metro" (with Metro Boomin and the Weeknd)	2024	9	6	6	68	17	111	—	—	— (Note: "Young Metro" did not enter the Swedish Singellista Chart, but peaked at number 13 on the Swedish Heatseeker Chart.)	— (Note: "Young Metro" did not enter the UK Singles Chart, as chart rules only allow three songs per artist to chart within the top one hundred at a time, but peaked at number 47 on the UK Streaming Chart.)	RIAA: Platinum; BPI: Silver; MC: Gold	We Don't Trust You
"Like That" (with Metro Boomin and Kendrick Lamar)	2024	1	1	1	8	1	66	10	2	46	6	RIAA: 7× Platinum; ARIA: Platinum; BPI: Platinum; MC: 3× Platinum; RMNZ: 2× Platinum	We Don't Trust You
"We Still Don't Trust You" (with Metro Boomin and the Weeknd)	2024	22	—	—	66	21	—	57	— (Note: "We Still Don't Trust You" did not enter the NZ Top 40 Singles Chart, but peaked at number five on the NZ Hot Singles Chart.)	— (Note: "We Still Don't Trust You" did not enter the Swedish Singellista Chart, but peaked at number 12 on the Swedish Heatseeker Chart.)	49	MC: Gold	We Still Don't Trust You
"Recipe for Love" (with Strick)	2024	—	—	—	—	—	—	—	— (Note: "Recipe for Love" did not enter the NZ Top 40 Singles Chart, but peaked at number 35 on the NZ Hot Singles Chart.)	—	—		Non-album single
"Too Fast"	2024	23	4	3	—	62	—	—	— (Note: "Too Fast" did not enter the NZ Top 40 Singles Chart, but peaked at number eight on the NZ Hot Singles Chart.)	—	77		Mixtape Pluto
"South of France" (solo or remix with Travis Scott)	2024	57	16	14	—	93	—	—	— (Note: "South of France" (Remix) did not enter the NZ Top 40 Singles Chart, but peaked at number six on the NZ Hot Singles Chart.)	—	—		Mixtape Pluto
"One of Them" (with DJ Khaled and Lil Baby)	2026	70	17	11	—	—	—	—	— (Note: "One of Them" did not enter the NZ Top 40 Singles Chart, but peaked at number 24 on the NZ Hot Singles Chart.)	—	—		Aalam of God
"Game Time" (with Tyla)	2026	— (Note: "Game Time" did not enter the Billboard Hot 100, but peaked at number four on the Bubbling Under Hot 100 chart.)	48	—	—	—	—	—	— (Note: "Game Time" did not enter the NZ Top 40 Singles Chart, but peaked at number 11 on the NZ Hot Singles Chart.)	—	—		FIFA World Cup 2026 Official Album
"Radio"	2026	46	18	12	—	—	—	—	— (Note: "Radio" did not enter the NZ Top 40 Singles Chart, but it peaked at number 10 on the NZ Hot Singles Chart.)	—	—		The Real Me
"Ya Hit" (featuring Drake, Travis Scott, and Loe Shimmy)	2026	38	5	3	—	23	—	—	— (Note: "Ya Hit" did not enter the NZ Top 40 Singles Chart, but it peaked at number 4 on the NZ Hot Singles Chart.)	—	—		Infinity
"—" denotes a recording that did not chart or was not released in that territory.

== As featured artist ==
=== 2010s ===
List of singles as featured artist, with selected chart positions and certifications, showing year released and album name
Title	Year	Peak chart positions										Certifications	Album
Title	Year	US	US R&B /HH	US Rap	AUS	CAN	FRA	IRE	NZ	SWE	UK	Certifications	Album
"Racks" (YC featuring Future)	2011	42	6	4	—	—	—	—	—	—	—	RIAA: Gold	Got Racks
"Going Ham" (Mr. Sipp featuring Future)	2011	—	— (Note: "Going Ham" did not enter the Hot R&B/Hip-Hop Songs chart, but peaked at number 18 on the Bubbling Under R&B/Hip-Hop Singles chart.)	—	—	—	—	—	—	—	—		Summer Thru the Winter
"All I See Is Hundreds" (Yayo featuring Future)	2011	—	—	—	—	—	—	—	—	—	—		Southern Smoke Radio 6
"We in This Bitch" (DJ Drama featuring Young Jeezy, T.I., Ludacris, and Future)	2012	—	68	—	—	—	—	—	—	—	—		Quality Street Music
"Itchin'" (DJ Infamous featuring Future)	2012	—	—	—	—	—	—	—	—	—	—		Non-album singles
"Pop Big Bottles" (London Taylor featuring Future)	2012	—	— (Note: "Pop Big Bottles" did not enter the Hot R&B/Hip-Hop Songs chart, but peaked at number 22 on the Bubbling Under R&B/Hip-Hop Singles chart.)	—	—	—	—	—	—	—	—		Non-album singles
"You Know" (Jazz Lazer featuring Future)	2012	—	—	—	—	—	—	—	—	—	—		Non-album singles
"Pain" (Pusha T featuring Future)	2012	—	—	—	—	—	—	—	—	—	—		My Name Is My Name
"Blow" (Ludacris featuring Juicy J and Future)	2012	—	—	—	—	—	—	—	—	—	—		Non-album single
"Love Me" (Lil Wayne featuring Drake and Future)	2013	9	4	3	92	49	27	—	—	—	44	RIAA: Diamond; BPI: Silver; RMNZ: 3× Platinum	I Am Not a Human Being II
"Bugatti" (Ace Hood featuring Rick Ross and Future)	2013	33	9	8	—	—	—	—	—	—	—	RIAA: Platinum	Trials & Tribulations
"Another One" (Slice 9 featuring Future and Levi Leer)	2013	98	40	—	—	—	—	—	—	—	—		Non-album single
"Fly Rich" (Rich Gang featuring Stevie J, Future, Tyga, Meek Mill, and Mystikal)	2013	—	— (Note: "Fly Rich" did not enter the Hot R&B/Hip-Hop Songs chart, but peaked at number ten on the Bubbling Under R&B/Hip-Hop Singles chart.)	—	—	—	—	—	—	—	—		Rich Gang
"Tapout" (Rich Gang featuring Lil Wayne, Birdman, Mack Maine, Nicki Minaj, and Future)	2013	44	10	8	—	—	134	—	—	—	—	RIAA: Gold	Rich Gang
"Loveeeeeee Song" (Rihanna featuring Future)	2013	55	14	—	—	—	110	—	—	—	—	RIAA: Platinum; ARIA: 2× Platinum; BPI: Platinum; RMNZ: 2× Platinum	Unapologetic
"U.O.E.N.O." (Rocko featuring Future and Rick Ross)	2013	20	5	4	—	—	—	—	—	—	—	RIAA: Gold	Gift of Gab 2
"Tell Me When You Ready" (Flo Rida featuring Future)	2013	—	— (Note: "Tell Me When You Ready" did not enter the Hot R&B/Hip-Hop Songs chart, but peaked at number three on the Bubbling Under R&B/Hip-Hop Singles chart.)	—	—	93	—	—	—	—	—		Non-album singles
"I'm on" (Lava Kno featuring Future)	2013	—	—	—	—	—	—	—	—	—	—		Non-album singles
"Twilight Zone" (Sean Garrett featuring Trey Songz and Future)	2013	—	—	—	—	—	—	—	—	—	—		Non-album singles
"Love Me Long Time" (Fat Joe featuring Future)	2013	—	—	—	—	—	—	—	—	—	—		Non-album singles
"I Wanna Be with You" (DJ Khaled featuring Nicki Minaj, Future, and Rick Ross)	2013	— (Note: "I Wanna Be with You" did not enter the Billboard Hot 100, but peaked at number one on the Bubbling Under Hot 100 Singles chart.)	30	22	—	—	—	—	—	—	—		Suffering from Success
"Show You" (Tyga featuring Future)	2013	—	— (Note: "Show You" did not enter the Hot R&B/Hip-Hop Songs chart, but peaked at number five on the Bubbling Under R&B/Hip-Hop Singles chart.)	—	—	—	—	—	—	—	—		Hotel California
"No Games" (Rick Ross featuring Future)	2013	— (Note: "No Games" did not enter the Billboard Hot 100, but peaked at number 19 on the Bubbling Under Hot 100 Singles chart.)	49	—	—	—	—	—	—	—	—		Non-album single
"Ready" (B.o.B featuring Future)	2013	— (Note: "Ready" did not enter the Billboard Hot 100, but peaked at number five on the Bubbling Under Hot 100 Singles chart.)	37	—	—	—	—	—	—	—	—		Underground Luxury
"Win Win" (B. Smyth featuring Future)	2013	—	—	—	—	—	—	—	—	—	—		The Florida Files
"Don't We" (Travis Porter featuring Future)	2014	—	—	—	—	—	—	—	—	—	—		Music Money Magnums 2
"DISFunction" (Young Scooter featuring Future, Juicy J, and Young Thug)	2014	—	—	—	—	—	—	—	—	—	—		Non-album single
"Buy the World" (Mike Will Made It featuring Future, Lil Wayne, and Kendrick Lamar)	2014	—	42	—	—	—	—	—	—	—	—	RIAA: Gold	Ransom
"Hold You Down" (DJ Khaled featuring Chris Brown, August Alsina, Future, and Jeremih)	2014	39	10	—	—	—	—	—	—	—	—	RIAA: Gold; RMNZ: Gold	I Changed a Lot
"Let Me Know" (Tamar Braxton featuring Future)	2014	—	36	—	—	—	—	—	—	—	—		Calling All Lovers
"Who Would Ever Thought" (Chief Keef featuring Future)	2014	—	—	—	—	—	—	—	—	—	—		The Leek, Vol. 1
"Drinks on Us" (Mike WiLL Made It featuring the Weeknd, Swae Lee, and Future)	2015	—	—	—	—	—	—	—	—	—	—	RIAA: Gold	Ransom
"Bellucci" (Booba featuring Future)	2015	—	—	—	—	—	—	—	—	—	—		D.U.C
"3500" (Travis Scott featuring Future and 2 Chainz)	2015	82	25	18	—	—	—	—	—	—	—	RIAA: Platinum; RMNZ: Gold	Rodeo
"Can't Lie" (Ralo featuring Future)	2015	—	—	—	—	—	—	—	—	—	—		Diary of the Streets
"Blasé" (Ty Dolla Sign featuring Future and Rae Sremmurd)	2015	63	20	—	—	—	—	—	—	—	—	RIAA: 2× Platinum; MC: Gold; RMNZ: Gold	Free TC
"Tricken Every Car I Get" (Trae tha Truth featuring Future and Boosie Badazz)	2015	—	—	—	—	—	—	—	—	—	—		Tha Truth
"You Mine" (DJ Khaled featuring Trey Songz, Future, and Jeremih)	2015	—	—	—	—	—	—	—	—	—	—		I Changed a Lot
"Hey There" (Dej Loaf featuring Future)	2015	— (Note: "Hey There" did not enter the Billboard Hot 100, but peaked at number 17 on the Bubbling Under Hot 100 Singles chart.)	47	—	—	—	—	—	—	—	—	RIAA: Platinum	...And See That's the Thing
"You Can See" (Jadakiss featuring Future)	2015	—	—	—	—	—	—	—	—	—	—		Top 5 Dead or Alive
"Right Now" (Uncle Murda featuring Future)	2015	—	—	—	—	—	—	—	—	—	—		Non-album singles
"UFO" (Timbaland featuring Future and Tink)	2015	—	—	—	—	—	—	—	—	—	—		Non-album singles
"New Level" (ASAP Ferg featuring Future)	2015	90	30	17	—	—	—	—	—	—	—	RIAA: 2× Platinum; RMNZ: Gold	Always Strive and Prosper
"Mi Combo" (Spiff TV featuring Yandel and Future)	2016	—	—	—	—	—	—	—	—	—	—		Dangerous
"I Got the Keys" (DJ Khaled featuring Jay Z and Future)	2016	30	11	9	—	55	125	—	—	—	149	RIAA: Platinum; MC: Platinum	Major Key
"Magic City Monday" (Jeezy featuring 2 Chainz and Future)	2016	—	52	—	—	—	—	—	—	—	—		Non-album single
"Campaign" (Ty Dolla Sign featuring Future)	2016	—	— (Note: "Campaign" did not enter the Hot R&B/Hip-Hop Songs chart, but peaked at number three on the Bubbling Under R&B/Hip-Hop Singles chart.)	—	—	—	—	—	—	—	—		Campaign
"X" (21 Savage and Metro Boomin featuring Future)	2016	36	12	10	—	66	—	—	—	—	—	RIAA: 2× Platinum; MC: 2× Platinum; RMNZ: Platinum	Savage Mode
"Do You Mind" (DJ Khaled featuring Nicki Minaj, Chris Brown, August Alsina, Jeremih, Future, and Rick Ross)	2016	27	9	7	65	93	162	—	— (Note: "Do You Mind" did not enter the NZ Top 40 Singles Chart, but peaked at number five on the NZ Heatseeker Singles Chart.)	—	197	RIAA: 2× Platinum; ARIA: 2× Platinum; MC: Gold	Major Key
"Seven Million" (Lil Uzi Vert featuring Future)	2016	—	— (Note: "Seven Million" did not enter the Hot R&B/Hip-Hop Songs chart, but peaked at number four on the Bubbling Under R&B/Hip-Hop Singles chart.)	—	—	—	—	—	—	—	—		The Perfect Luv Tape
"Too Much Sauce" (DJ Esco featuring Future and Lil Uzi Vert)	2016	50	21	15	—	—	—	—	—	—	—	RIAA: Gold	Project E.T.
"Rivals" (Usher featuring Future)	2016	—	— (Note: "Rivals" did not enter the Hot R&B/Hip-Hop Songs chart, but peaked at number eight on the Bubbling Under R&B/Hip-Hop Singles chart.)	—	—	—	—	—	—	—	—		Hard II Love
"Everyday" (Ariana Grande featuring Future)	2017	55	—	—	96	54	—	—	— (Note: "Everyday" did not enter the NZ Top 40 Singles Chart, but peaked at number three on the NZ Heatseeker Singles Chart.)	—	131	RIAA: Platinum; ARIA: Platinum; BPI: Gold; MC: Platinum; RMNZ: Platinum	Dangerous Woman
"Cold" (Maroon 5 featuring Future)	2017	16	—	—	27	12	37	21	29	25	24	RIAA: Platinum; ARIA: 2× Platinum; BPI: Gold; MC: 3× Platinum; SNEP: Gold; RMNZ: Platinum	Red Pill Blues
"No Pressure" (French Montana featuring Future)	2017	—	—	—	—	—	—	—	—	—	—		Jungle Rules
"Rollin" (Calvin Harris featuring Future and Khalid)	2017	62	—	—	40	36	38	23	34	67	43	RIAA: Platinum; ARIA: Gold; BPI: Silver; GLF: Gold; RMNZ: 2× Platinum	Funk Wav Bounces Vol. 1
"Congratulations" (Remix) (Post Malone featuring Quavo and Future)	2017	—	—	—	—	—	—	—	—	—	—		Non-album single
"End Game" (Taylor Swift featuring Ed Sheeran and Future)	2017	18	—	—	36	11	130	68	— (Note: "End Game" did not enter the NZ Top 40 Singles Chart, but peaked at number two on the NZ Heatseeker Singles Chart.)	—	49	RIAA: Platinum; ARIA: 3× Platinum; BPI: Silver; MC: Platinum; RMNZ: Platinum	Reputation
"Thinkin" (Spiff TV featuring Anuel AA, Bad Bunny, and Future)	2018	—	—	—	—	—	—	—	—	—	—	RIAA: Gold	Non-album single
"Faded Love" (Tinashe featuring Future)	2018	—	—	—	—	—	—	—	— (Note: "Faded Love" did not enter the NZ Top 40 Singles Chart, but peaked at number 10 on the NZ Heatseeker Singles Chart.)	—	—		Joyride
"Top Off" (DJ Khaled featuring Jay-Z, Future, and Beyoncé)	2018	22	14	11	— (Note: "Top Off" did not enter the ARIA Singles Chart, but peaked at number 32 on the Australian Urban Singles Chart.)	48	55	67	— (Note: "Top Off" did not enter the NZ Top 40 Singles Chart, but peaked at number five on the NZ Heatseeker Singles Chart.)	60	41	MC: Gold	Father of Asahd
"Green Gucci Suit" (Rick Ross featuring Future)	2018	—	—	—	—	—	—	—	—	—	—		Non-album single
"Spin the Block" (Lil Durk featuring Future)	2018	—	—	—	—	—	—	—	—	—	—	RIAA: Gold	Signed to the Streets 3
"Holy Terrain" (FKA Twigs featuring Future)	2019	—	—	—	—	—	—	—	—	—	—		Magdalene
"No Cryin" (Dvsn featuring Future)	2019	—	—	—	—	—	—	—	—	—	—		A Muse in Her Feelings
"—" denotes a recording that did not chart or was not released in that territory.

=== 2020s ===
List of singles as featured artist, with selected chart positions and certifications, showing year released and album name
Title	Year	Peak chart positions										Certifications	Album
Title	Year	US	US R&B /HH	US Rap	AUS	CAN	FRA	IRE	NZ	SWE	UK	Certifications	Album
"Big Drip" (Ufo361 featuring Future)	2020	—	—	—	—	—	—	—	—	—	—		Rich Rich
"Dead Man Walking" (2 Chainz featuring Future)	2020	—	—	—	—	—	—	—	—	—	—		Non-album single
"1st n 3rd" (Marlo featuring Lil Baby and Future)	2020	—	—	—	—	—	—	—	—	—	—		1st n 3rd
"Happiness Over Everything (H.O.E.)" (Jhené Aiko featuring Future and Miguel)	2020	65	41	—	—	—	—	—	— (Note: "Happiness Over Everything (H.O.E.)" did not enter the NZ Top 40 Singles Chart, but peaked at number 31 on the NZ Hot Singles Chart.)	—	—	RIAA: Platinum	Chilombo
"Roses (Remix)" (Saint Jhn featuring Future)	2020	—	36	—	—	—	—	—	—	—	—	RIAA: Gold	Non-album singles
"What It Was" (Lil Gotit featuring Future)	2020	—	—	—	—	—	—	—	—	—	—		Non-album singles
"Rari" (Octavian featuring Future)	2020	—	—	—	—	—	—	—	—	—	73		Alpha
"Thrusting" (Internet Money featuring Swae Lee and Future)	2020	—	—	—	—	—	—	—	—	—	—		B4 the Storm
"Franchise" (Remix) (Travis Scott featuring Future, Young Thug, and M.I.A.)	2020	—	—	—	—	—	—	—	— (Note: "Franchise" (Remix) did not enter the NZ Top 40 Singles Chart, but peaked at number 15 on the NZ Hot Singles Chart.)	—	—		Non-album single
"Tweakin" (Doe Boy and Southside featuring Future)	2020	—	—	—	—	—	—	—	—	—	—		Demons R Us
"Go Crazy (Remix)" (Chris Brown and Young Thug featuring Future, Lil Durk, and Latto)	2021	—	—	—	—	—	—	—	— (Note: "Go Crazy" (Remix) did not enter the NZ Top 40 Singles Chart, but peaked at number 27 on the NZ Hot Singles Chart.)	—	—		Non-album singles
"Holdin Me Down" (King Combs featuring Future)	2021	—	—	—	—	—	—	—	—	—	—		Non-album singles
"Company" (24kGoldn featuring Future)	2021	—	—	—	—	—	—	—	— (Note: "Company" did not enter the NZ Top 40 Singles Chart, but peaked at number 37 on the NZ Hot Singles Chart.)	—	—		El Dorado
"Take Off" (Euro Gotit featuring Future and Bangladesh)	2021	—	—	—	—	—	—	—	—	—	—		Non-album single
"Maybach" (42 Dugg featuring Future)	2021	68	23	16	—	—	—	—	—	—	—	RIAA: Gold	Free Dem Boyz
"Running Out of Patience" (Unfoonk and YSL Records featuring Future)	2021	—	—	—	—	—	—	—	—	—	—		My Struggle
"Tear the Club Up" (Icewear Vezzo featuring Future)	2021	—	—	—	—	—	—	—	—	—	—		Non-album single
"Mr. Jones" (Pop Smoke featuring Future)	2021	71	26	21	—	49	175	—	—	—	—		Faith
"Not Jus Anybody" (Jacquees featuring Future)	2021	—	—	—	—	—	—	—	—	—	—		Non-album singles
"3 Cell Phones" (DJ Swamp Izzo featuring Future)	2021	—	—	—	—	—	—	—	—	—	—		Non-album singles
"Way 2 Sexy" (Drake featuring Future and Young Thug)	2021	1	1	1	7	3	28	15	7	25	11	ARIA: Platinum; BPI: Gold; RMNZ: Platinum; SNEP: Gold	Certified Lover Boy
"Who Knew" (Meech La'flare and Mosco featuring Future)	2021	—	—	—	—	—	—	—	—	—	—		Non-album singles
"Your Latino Boyfriend" (Helmut Rhode featuring Future)	2021	—	—	—	—	—	—	—	—	—	—		Non-album singles
"Made a Way" (FaZe Kaysan featuring Future and Lil Durk)	2021	—	—	—	—	—	—	—	—	—	—		Non-album singles
"Me or Sum" (Nardo Wick featuring Future and Lil Baby)	2021	58	15	10	—	—	—	—	—	—	—	RIAA: Platinum	Who Is Nardo Wick?
"Pressurelicious" (Megan Thee Stallion featuring Future)	2022	55	14	13	—	—	—	—	—	—	—		Traumazine
"Turn On the Lights again.." (Fred Again and Swedish House Mafia featuring Future)	2022	—	—	—	71	—	—	23	—	— (Note: "Turn on the Lights Again" did not enter the Swedish Singellista Chart, but peaked at number 18 on the Swedish Heatseeker Chart.)	27	ARIA: Gold; BPI: Silver; RMNZ: Platinum	USB
"Shoot It Myself" (EST Gee featuring Future)	2022	— (Note: "Shoot It Myself" did not enter the Billboard Hot 100, but peaked at number 10 on the Bubbling Under Hot 100 Singles chart.)	40	—	—	—	—	—	—	—	—		I Never Felt Nun
"One Time" (Nav and Don Toliver featuring Future)	2022	— (Note: "One Time" did not enter the Billboard Hot 100, but peaked at number five on the Bubbling Under Hot 100 Singles chart.)	37	—	—	55	—	—	—	—	—		Demons Protected by Angels
"Blues" (G Herbo featuring Future)	2022	—	—	—	—	—	—	—	—	—	—		Survivor's Remorse
"Big Time" (DJ Khaled featuring Future and Lil Baby)	2022	31	11	9	—	50	—	—	—	—	—		God Did
"No Time Wasted" (Polo G featuring Future)	2023	69	27	14	—	73	—	—	— (Note: "No Time Wasted" did not enter the NZ Top 40 Singles Chart, but peaked at number 17 on the NZ Hot Singles Chart.)	—	—		Non-album single
"Private Landing" (Don Toliver featuring Justin Bieber and Future)	2023	72	25	14	—	59	—	78	— (Note: "Private Landing" did not enter the NZ Top 40 Singles Chart, but peaked at number nine on the NZ Hot Singles Chart.)	—	74	RIAA: Platinum; MC: 2× Platinum; RMNZ: Platinum	Love Sick
"Transformer" (Blackowned C-Bone featuring Future and P.Dukes)	2023	—	—	—	—	—	—	—	—	—	—		3men2 Kbrn
"Double Fantasy" (The Weeknd featuring Future)	2023	18	8	—	9	7	34	13	11	18	14	ARIA: Gold; RMNZ: Gold	The Idol Episode 2 (Music from the HBO Original Series)
"Scientists & Engineers" (Killer Mike and André 3000 featuring Future and Eryn Allen Kane)	2023	—	—	—	—	—	—	—	39	—	—		Michael
"Giving Chanel" (Meek Mill featuring Future)	2024	— (Note: "Giving Chanel" did not enter the Billboard Hot 100, but peaked at number 11 on the Bubbling Under Hot 100 Singles chart.)	42	—	—	—	—	—	—	—	—		Heathenism
"Swear to God" (Tee Grizzley featuring Future)	2024	— (Note: "Swear to God" did not enter the Billboard Hot 100, but peaked at number 10 on the Bubbling Under Hot 100 Singles chart.)	40	—	—	—	—	—	— (Note: "Swear to God" did not enter the NZ Top 40 Singles Chart, but peaked at number 38 on the NZ Hot Singles Chart.)	—	—		Post Traumatic
"Slow Down" (KitschKrieg featuring Future, Fridayy and Mariah the Scientist)	2024	—	—	—	—	—	—	—	—	—	—		Non-album single
"Fxck Up the World" (Lisa featuring Future)	2025	— (Note: "Fxck Up the World" did not enter the Billboard Hot 100, but peaked at number six on the Bubbling Under Hot 100 Singles chart.)	36	20	—	85	—	—	— (Note: "Fxck Up the World" did not enter the NZ Top 40 Singles Chart, but peaked at number four on the NZ Hot Singles Chart.)	—	—		Alter Ego
"Money on Money" (Young Thug featuring Future)	2025	39	10	7	—	62	—	—	— (Note: "Money on Money" did not enter the NZ Top 40 Singles Chart, but peaked at number 3 on the NZ Hot Singles Chart.)	—	—		UY Scuti
"That's It" (Yung Lean featuring Metro Boomin and Future)	2026	—	—	—	—	—	—	—	—	—	—		Grand Theft Auto VI: The Album
"—" denotes a recording that did not chart or was not released in that territory.

== Promotional singles ==
List of singles as lead artist, with selected chart positions and certifications, showing year released and album name
Title	Year	Peak chart positions						Certifications	Album
Title	Year	US	US R&B /HH	CAN	FRA	SWI	UK	Certifications	Album
"Ain't No Way Around It" (Remix) (DJ Drama featuring Future, Big Boi, and Young Jeezy)	2011	—	—	—	—	—	—		Third Power
"We in This Bitch 1.5" (DJ Drama featuring Drake and Future)	2012	—	—	—	—	—	—		Quality Street Music
"Body Party (Remix)" (Ciara featuring Future and B.o.B)	2013	—	—	—	—	—	—		Ciara
"High End" (Chris Brown featuring Future and Young Thug)	2017	82	32	57	93	78	71	RIAA: Gold	Heartbreak on a Full Moon
"1000" (N.E.R.D featuring Future)	2017	—	—	—	—	—	—		No One Ever Really Dies
"Bag" (featuring Yung Bans)	2018	—	—	—	—	—	—		Superfly: Original Motion Picture Soundtrack
"Walk on Minks"	2018	—	—	—	—	—	—		Superfly: Original Motion Picture Soundtrack
"Keep It Low" (Moneybagg Yo featuring Future)	2023	59	19	—	—	—	—	RIAA: Gold	Hard to Love
"—" denotes a recording that did not chart or was not released in that territory.

== Other charted and certified songs ==
=== 2010s ===
List of other charted and certified songs, with selected chart positions and certifications, showing year released and album name
Title	Year	Peak chart positions										Certifications	Album
Title	Year	US	US R&B /HH	US Rap	AUS	CAN	FRA	IRE	NZ	SWE	UK	Certifications	Album
"Watch This" (featuring Rocko)	2011	—	78	—	—	—	—	—	—	—	—		Dirty Sprite
"Gone to the Moon"	2011	—	— (Note: "Gone to the Moon" did not enter the Hot R&B/Hip-Hop Songs chart, but peaked at number 15 on the Bubbling Under R&B/Hip-Hop Singles chart.)	—	—	—	—	—	—	—	—		Streetz Calling
"Ain't No Way Around It" (DJ Drama featuring Future)	2011	—	98	—	—	—	—	—	—	—	—		Third Power
"Word 2 My Muva" (Chubbie Baby featuring Future)	2011	—	— (Note: "Word 2 My Muva" did not enter the Hot R&B/Hip-Hop Songs chart, but peaked at number six on the Bubbling Under R&B/Hip-Hop Singles chart.)	—	—	—	—	—	—	—	—		36 Oz.
"Shinin'" (Stuey Rock featuring Future)	2011	—	— (Note: "Shinin'" did not enter the Hot R&B/Hip-Hop Songs chart, but peaked at number two on the Bubbling Under R&B/Hip-Hop Singles chart.)	—	—	—	—	—	—	—	—		Non-album single
"Squares Out Your Circle" (Rocko featuring Future)	2011	—	66	—	—	—	—	—	—	—	—		Gift of Gab
"Way Too Gone" (Young Jeezy featuring Future)	2011	—	87	—	—	—	—	—	—	—	—		Thug Motivation 103: Hustlerz Ambition
"Ring Ring" (Rick Ross featuring Future)	2012	—	88	—	—	—	—	—	—	—	—		Rich Forever
"Itchin'"	2012	—	85	—	—	—	—	—	—	—	—		Astronaut Status
"Hood Rich Anthem" (DJ Scream featuring 2 Chainz, Future, Waka Flocka Flame, Yo Gotti, and Gucci Mane)	2012	—	96	—	—	—	—	—	—	—	—		Long Live the Hustle
"Bitches & Bottles (Let's Get It Started)" (DJ Khaled featuring Lil Wayne, T.I., and Future)	2012	— (Note: "Bitches & Bottles (Let's Get It Started)" did not enter the Billboard Hot 100, but peaked at number nine on the Bubbling Under Hot 100 Singles chart.)	— (Note: "Bitches & Bottles (Let's Get It Started)" did not enter the Hot R&B/Hip-Hop Songs chart, but peaked at number 24 on the Bubbling Under R&B/Hip-Hop Singles chart.)	—	—	—	—	—	—	—	—		Kiss the Ring
"My Darlin'" (Miley Cyrus featuring Future)	2013	— (Note: "My Darlin'" did not enter the Billboard Hot 100, but peaked at number 12 on the Bubbling Under Hot 100 Singles chart.)	—	—	—	80	—	—	—	—	—		Bangerz
"What's Hatnin'" (Justin Bieber featuring Future)	2013	—	—	—	—	—	—	—	—	—	193		Journals
"Never Satisfied" (featuring Drake)	2014	—	—	—	—	—	—	—	—	—	—		Honest
"DnF" (P Reign featuring Future and Drake)	2014	—	41	—	—	—	—	—	—	—	—		Dear America
"Codeine Crazy"	2014	—	—	—	—	—	—	—	—	—	—	RIAA: Platinum; RMNZ: Gold	Monster
"Throw Away"	2014	—	—	—	—	—	—	—	—	—	—	RIAA: Platinum	Monster
"Crystal" (Kaaris featuring Future)	2015	—	—	—	—	—	19	—	—	—	—		Le Bruit de mon âme
"Trap Niggas"	2015	— (Note: "Trap Niggas" did not enter the Billboard Hot 100, but peaked at number two on the Bubbling Under Hot 100 Singles chart.)	—	—	—	—	—	—	—	—	—	RIAA: Platinum	56 Nights and DS2
"Jump Out the Face" (Meek Mill featuring Future)	2015	91	29	23	—	—	—	—	—	—	—	RIAA: Gold	Dreams Worth More Than Money
"Real Sisters"	2015	—	—	—	—	—	—	—	—	—	—	RIAA: Platinum	Beast Mode and DS2
"Rich Sex"	2015	100	32	—	—	—	—	—	—	—	—	RIAA: Platinum	DS2
"Blood on the Money"	2015	—	—	—	—	—	—	—	—	—	—	RIAA: Platinum	DS2
"Freak Hoe"	2015	—	—	—	—	—	—	—	—	—	—	RIAA: Platinum	DS2
"Slave Master"	2015	—	—	—	—	—	—	—	—	—	—	RIAA: Gold	DS2
"I Serve the Base"	2015	—	—	—	—	—	—	—	—	—	—	RIAA: Platinum	DS2
"Thought It Was a Drought"	2015	—	—	—	—	—	—	—	—	—	—	RIAA: 2× Platinum	DS2
"Blow a Bag"	2015	95	26	22	—	—	—	—	—	—	—	RIAA: Platinum	DS2
"The Percocet & Stripper Joint"	2015	—	—	—	—	—	—	—	—	—	—	RIAA: 3× Platinum; RMNZ: Platinum	DS2 (Deluxe)
"Kno the Meaning"	2015	—	—	—	—	—	—	—	—	—	—	RIAA: Platinum	DS2 (Deluxe)
"Digital Dash" (with Drake)	2015	62	29	18	—	—	—	—	—	—	—		What a Time to Be Alive
"Big Rings" (with Drake)	2015	52	16	12	—	91	—	—	—	—	141	RIAA: 2× Platinum; ARIA: Gold	What a Time to Be Alive
"Live from the Gutter" (with Drake)	2015	74	30	23	—	—	—	—	—	—	—		What a Time to Be Alive
"Diamonds Dancing" (with Drake)	2015	53	24	15	—	79	—	—	—	—	—	RIAA: Platinum	What a Time to Be Alive
"Scholarships" (with Drake)	2015	69	31	21	—	—	—	—	—	—	—		What a Time to Be Alive
"Plastic Bag" (with Drake)	2015	78	43	25	—	—	—	—	—	—	—		What a Time to Be Alive
"I'm the Plug" (with Drake)	2015	76	33	23	—	—	—	—	—	—	—		What a Time to Be Alive
"Change Locations" (with Drake)	2015	82	39	—	—	—	—	—	—	—	—		What a Time to Be Alive
"Jersey"	2015	87	48	—	—	—	—	—	—	—	—		What a Time to Be Alive
"Ain't No Time"	2016	—	44	—	—	—	—	—	—	—	—	RIAA: Gold	Evol
"Maybach"	2016	—	46	—	—	—	—	—	—	—	—		Evol
"Xanny Family"	2016	—	40	—	—	—	—	—	—	—	—	RIAA: Gold	Evol
"Lil Haiti Baby"	2016	—	— (Note: "Lil Haiti Baby" did not enter the Hot R&B/Hip-Hop Songs chart, but peaked at number nine on the Bubbling Under R&B/Hip-Hop Singles chart.)	—	—	—	—	—	—	—	—		Evol
"Seven Rings"	2016	—	49	—	—	—	—	—	—	—	—		Evol
"Fly Shit Only"	2016	67	22	13	—	—	168	—	—	—	—	RIAA: Platinum	Evol
"Grammys" (Drake featuring Future)	2016	38	18	7	—	34	—	87	—	—	73	RIAA: Platinum; ARIA: Gold; BPI: Silver	Views
"Smoke Break" (Chance the Rapper featuring Future)	2016	—	51	—	—	—	—	—	—	—	—	RIAA: Platinum	Coloring Book
"All I Know" (The Weeknd featuring Future)	2016	46	21	—	—	38	184	96	—	—	76	ARIA: Gold; MC: Gold	Starboy
"Rent Money"	2017	54	21	14	—	64	—	—	—	—	—	RIAA: Platinum	Future
"Super Trapper"	2017	91	37	—	—	—	—	—	—	—	—	RIAA: Gold	Future
"Zoom"	2017	99	40	—	—	—	—	—	—	—	—		Future
"Good Dope"	2017	— (Note: "Good Dope" did not enter the Billboard Hot 100, but peaked at number five on the Bubbling Under Hot 100 Singles chart.)	44	—	—	—	—	—	—	—	—		Future
"I'm So Groovy"	2017	— (Note: "I'm So Groovy" did not enter the Billboard Hot 100, but peaked at number six on the Bubbling Under Hot 100 Singles chart.)	45	—	—	—	—	—	—	—	—	RIAA: Platinum	Future
"High Demand"	2017	— (Note: "High Demand" did not enter the Billboard Hot 100, but peaked at number 10 on the Bubbling Under Hot 100 Singles chart.)	48	—	—	—	—	—	—	—	—		Future
"Might as Well"	2017	— (Note: "Might as Well" did not enter the Billboard Hot 100, but peaked at number 11 on the Bubbling Under Hot 100 Singles chart.)	49	—	—	—	—	—	—	—	—	RIAA: Gold	Future
"Scrape"	2017	— (Note: "Scrape" did not enter the Billboard Hot 100, but peaked at number 13 on the Bubbling Under Hot 100 Singles chart.)	— (Note: "Scrape" did not enter the Hot R&B/Hip-Hop Songs chart, but peaked at number one on the Bubbling Under R&B/Hip-Hop Singles chart.)	—	—	—	—	—	—	—	—		Future
"Poppin Tags"	2017	— (Note: "Poppin Tags" did not enter the Billboard Hot 100, but peaked at number 15 on the Bubbling Under Hot 100 Singles chart.)	— (Note: "Poppin' Tags" did not enter the Hot R&B/Hip-Hop Songs chart, but peaked at number two on the Bubbling Under R&B/Hip-Hop Singles chart.)	—	—	—	—	—	—	—	—		Future
"Outta Time"	2017	— (Note: "Outta Time" did not enter the Billboard Hot 100, but peaked at number 16 on the Bubbling Under Hot 100 Singles chart.)	— (Note: "Outta Time" did not enter the Hot R&B/Hip-Hop Songs chart, but peaked at number three on the Bubbling Under R&B/Hip-Hop Singles chart.)	—	—	—	—	—	—	—	—		Future
"When I Was Broke"	2017	— (Note: "When I Was Broke" did not enter the Billboard Hot 100, but peaked at number 22 on the Bubbling Under Hot 100 Singles chart.)	— (Note: "When I Was Broke" did not enter the Hot R&B/Hip-Hop Songs chart, but peaked at number six on the Bubbling Under R&B/Hip-Hop Singles chart.)	—	—	—	—	—	—	—	—	RIAA: Gold	Future
"Feds Did a Sweep"	2017	—	— (Note: "Feds Did a Sweep" did not enter the Hot R&B/Hip-Hop Songs chart, but peaked at number seven on the Bubbling Under R&B/Hip-Hop Singles chart.)	—	—	—	—	—	—	—	—	RIAA: Platinum	Future
"POA"	2017	—	— (Note: "POA" did not enter the Hot R&B/Hip-Hop Songs chart, but peaked at number nine on the Bubbling Under R&B/Hip-Hop Singles chart.)	—	—	—	—	—	—	—	—		Future
"Comin Out Strong" (featuring the Weeknd)	2017	48	19	11	—	43	82	—	—	—	83	RIAA: 2× Platinum; MC: Platinum; RMNZ: Gold	Hndrxx
"My Collection"	2017	— (Note: "My Collection" did not enter the Billboard Hot 100, but peaked at number two on the Bubbling Under Hot 100 Singles chart.)	39	25	—	—	—	—	—	—	—	RIAA: Platinum	Hndrxx
"Lookin' Exotic"	2017	— (Note: "Lookin' Exotic" did not enter the Billboard Hot 100, but peaked at number seven on the Bubbling Under Hot 100 Singles chart.)	44	—	—	—	—	—	—	—	—		Hndrxx
"Damage"	2017	— (Note: "Damage" did not enter the Billboard Hot 100, but peaked at number 12 on the Bubbling Under Hot 100 Singles chart.)	49	—	—	—	—	—	—	—	—		Hndrxx
"Use Me"	2017	— (Note: "Use Me" did not enter the Billboard Hot 100, but peaked at number 17 on the Bubbling Under Hot 100 Singles chart.)	— (Note: "Use Me" did not enter the Hot R&B/Hip-Hop Songs chart, but peaked at number two on the Bubbling Under R&B/Hip-Hop Singles chart.)	—	—	—	—	—	—	—	—	RIAA: Gold	Hndrxx
"Solo"	2017	— (Note: "Solo" did not enter the Billboard Hot 100, but peaked at number 22 on the Bubbling Under Hot 100 Singles chart.)	— (Note: "Solo" did not enter the Hot R&B/Hip-Hop Songs chart, but peaked at number four on the Bubbling Under R&B/Hip-Hop Singles chart.)	—	—	—	—	—	—	—	—	RIAA: 4× Platinum; SNEP: Gold; RMNZ: Platinum	Hndrxx
"Fresh Air"	2017	— (Note: "Fresh Air" did not enter the Billboard Hot 100, but peaked at number 25 on the Bubbling Under Hot 100 Singles chart.)	— (Note: "Fresh Air" did not enter the Hot R&B/Hip-Hop Songs chart, but peaked at number five on the Bubbling Under R&B/Hip-Hop Singles chart.)	—	—	—	—	—	—	—	—		Hndrxx
"Sorry"	2017	—	— (Note: "Sorry" did not enter the Hot R&B/Hip-Hop Songs chart, but peaked at number six on the Bubbling Under R&B/Hip-Hop Singles chart.)	—	—	—	—	—	—	—	—		Hndrxx
"Hallucinating"	2017	—	— (Note: "Hallucinating" did not enter the Hot R&B/Hip-Hop Songs chart, but peaked at number seven on the Bubbling Under R&B/Hip-Hop Singles chart.)	—	—	—	—	—	—	—	—	RIAA: Gold	Hndrxx
"Testify"	2017	—	— (Note: "Testify" did not enter the Hot R&B/Hip-Hop Songs chart, but peaked at number eight on the Bubbling Under R&B/Hip-Hop Singles chart.)	—	—	—	—	—	—	—	—		Hndrxx
"Conscience" (Kodak Black featuring Future)	2017	93	42	—	—	—	—	—	—	—	—	RIAA: Gold	Painting Pictures
"Down for Life" (DJ Khaled featuring PartyNextDoor, Future, Travis Scott, Rick Ross, and Kodak Black)	2017	— (Note: "Down for Life" did not enter the Billboard Hot 100, but peaked at number 25 on the Bubbling Under Hot 100 Singles chart.)	— (Note: "Down for Life" did not enter the Hot R&B/Hip-Hop Songs chart, but peaked at number nine on the Bubbling Under R&B/Hip-Hop Singles chart.)	—	—	—	—	—	—	—	—		Grateful
"These Scars" (Meek Mill featuring Future and Guordon Banks)	2017	—	55	—	—	—	—	—	—	—	—		Wins & Losses
"Relationship" (Young Thug featuring Future)	2017	65	26	22	—	26	—	—	—	—	—	RIAA: 2× Platinum; BPI: Silver; RMNZ: Platinum	Beautiful Thugger Girls
"No Cap" (with Young Thug)	2017	62	25	20	—	77	—	—	—	—	—	RIAA: Gold	Super Slimey
"Feed Me Dope"	2017	68	28	23	—	85	—	—	—	—	—		Super Slimey
"All da Smoke" (with Young Thug)	2017	77	31	—	—	99	—	—	—	—	—	RIAA: Platinum	Super Slimey
"4 da Gang"	2017	92	37	—	—	—	—	—	—	—	—		Super Slimey
"Three" (with Young Thug)	2017	100	41	—	—	—	—	—	—	—	—		Super Slimey
"Drip on Me" (with Young Thug)	2017	— (Note: "Drip on Me" did not enter the Billboard Hot 100, but peaked at number two on the Bubbling Under Hot 100 Singles chart.)	43	—	—	—	—	—	—	—	—		Super Slimey
"200" (with Young Thug)	2017	— (Note: "200" did not enter the Billboard Hot 100, but peaked at number three on the Bubbling Under Hot 100 Singles chart.)	44	—	—	—	—	—	—	—	—		Super Slimey
"Real Love" (with Young Thug)	2017	— (Note: "Real Love" did not enter the Billboard Hot 100, but peaked at number five on the Bubbling Under Hot 100 Singles chart.)	48	—	—	—	—	—	—	—	—		Super Slimey
"Mink Flow" (with Young Thug)	2017	— (Note: "Mink Flow" did not enter the Billboard Hot 100, but peaked at number 12 on the Bubbling Under Hot 100 Singles chart.)	— (Note: "Mink Flow" did not enter the Hot R&B/Hip-Hop Songs chart, but peaked at number two on the Bubbling Under R&B/Hip-Hop Singles chart.)	—	—	—	—	—	—	—	—		Super Slimey
"Group Home" (with Young Thug)	2017	— (Note: "Group Home" did not enter the Billboard Hot 100, but peaked at number 21 on the Bubbling Under Hot 100 Singles chart.)	— (Note: "Group Home" did not enter the Hot R&B/Hip-Hop Songs chart, but peaked at number six on the Bubbling Under R&B/Hip-Hop Singles chart.)	—	—	—	—	—	—	—	—		Super Slimey
"Wifi Lit"	2018	53	26	23	—	—	—	—	— (Note: "Wifi Lit" did not enter the NZ Top 40 Singles Chart, but peaked at number 21 on the NZ Hot Singles Chart.)	—	—	RIAA: Gold	Beast Mode 2
"31 Days"	2018	64	34	—	—	—	—	—	—	—	—	RIAA: Platinum	Beast Mode 2
"Cuddle My Wrist"	2018	70	38	—	—	—	—	—	—	—	—	RIAA: Gold	Beast Mode 2
"Racks Blue"	2018	76	42	—	—	—	—	—	—	—	—	RIAA: Gold	Beast Mode 2
"Red Light"	2018	— (Note: "Red Light" did not enter the Billboard Hot 100, but peaked at number six on the Bubbling Under Hot 100 Singles chart.)	— (Note: "Red Light" did not enter the Hot R&B/Hip-Hop Songs chart, but peaked at number three on the Bubbling Under R&B/Hip-Hop Singles chart.)	—	—	—	—	—	—	—	—		Beast Mode 2
"Some More"	2018	— (Note: "Some More" did not enter the Billboard Hot 100, but peaked at number seven on the Bubbling Under Hot 100 Singles chart.)	— (Note: "Some More" did not enter the Hot R&B/Hip-Hop Songs chart, but peaked at number four on the Bubbling Under R&B/Hip-Hop Singles chart.)	—	—	—	—	—	—	—	—		Beast Mode 2
"Doh Doh" (featuring Young Scooter)	2018	— (Note: "Doh Doh" did not enter the Billboard Hot 100, but peaked at number 11 on the Bubbling Under Hot 100 Singles chart.)	— (Note: "Doh Doh" did not enter the Hot R&B/Hip-Hop Songs chart, but peaked at number six on the Bubbling Under R&B/Hip-Hop Singles chart.)	—	—	—	—	—	—	—	—		Beast Mode 2
"When I Think About It"	2018	— (Note: "When I Think About It" did not enter the Billboard Hot 100, but peaked at number 15 on the Bubbling Under Hot 100 Singles chart.)	— (Note: "When I Think About It" did not enter the Hot R&B/Hip-Hop Songs chart, but peaked at number seven on the Bubbling Under R&B/Hip-Hop Singles chart.)	—	—	—	—	—	—	—	—		Beast Mode 2
"Hate the Real Me"	2018	— (Note: "Hate the Real Me" did not enter the Billboard Hot 100, but peaked at number 24 on the Bubbling Under Hot 100 Singles chart.)	—	—	—	—	—	—	—	—	—		Beast Mode 2
"East Atlanta Love Letter" (6lack featuring Future)	2018	— (Note: "East Atlanta Love Letter" did not enter the Billboard Hot 100, but peaked at number seven on the Bubbling Under Hot 100 chart.)	— (Note: "East Atlanta Love Letter" did not enter the Hot R&B/Hip-Hop Songs chart, but peaked at number two on the Bubbling Under R&B/Hip-Hop Singles chart.)	—	—	—	—	—	— (Note: "East Atlanta Love Letter" did not enter the NZ Top 40 Singles Chart, but peaked at number 24 on the NZ Hot Singles Chart.)	—	—	RIAA: Gold	East Atlanta Love Letter
"Jet Lag" (with Juice Wrld featuring Young Scooter)	2018	72	33	—	—	87	—	—	— (Note: "Jet Lag" did not enter the NZ Top 40 Singles Chart, but peaked at number 29 on the NZ Hot Singles Chart.)	—	—	RIAA: Gold	Wrld on Drugs
"Astronauts" (with Juice Wrld)	2018	82	39	—	—	—	—	—	—	—	—	RIAA: Gold	Wrld on Drugs
"Red Bentley" (with Juice Wrld featuring Young Thug)	2018	— (Note: "Red Bentley" did not enter the Billboard Hot 100, but peaked at number one on the Bubbling Under Hot 100 chart.)	50	—	—	—	—	—	—	—	—		Wrld on Drugs
"Oxy" (featuring Lil Wayne)	2018	— (Note: "Oxy" did not enter the Billboard Hot 100, but peaked at number six on the Bubbling Under Hot 100 chart.)	— (Note: "Oxy" did not enter the Hot R&B/Hip-Hop Songs chart, but peaked at number four on the Bubbling Under R&B/Hip-Hop Singles chart.)	—	—	—	—	—	—	—	—		Wrld on Drugs
"7 AM Freestyle" (with Juice Wrld)	2018	— (Note: "7 AM Freestyle" did not enter the Billboard Hot 100, but peaked at number eight on the Bubbling Under Hot 100 chart.)	— (Note: "7 AM Freestyle" did not enter the Hot R&B/Hip-Hop Songs chart, but peaked at number five on the Bubbling Under R&B/Hip-Hop Singles chart.)	—	—	—	—	—	—	—	—	RIAA: Gold	Wrld on Drugs
"Shorty" (with Juice Wrld)	2018	— (Note: "Shorty" did not enter the Billboard Hot 100, but peaked at number 23 on the Bubbling Under Hot 100 chart.)	—	—	—	—	—	—	—	—	—		Wrld on Drugs
"Realer n Realer" (with Juice Wrld)	2018	— (Note: "Realer n Realer" did not enter the Billboard Hot 100, but peaked at number two on the Bubbling Under Hot 100 chart.)	—	—	—	—	—	—	—	—	—	RIAA: Platinum	Wrld on Drugs
"Wrld on Drugs" (with Juice Wrld)	2018	— (Note: "Wrld on Drugs" did not enter the Billboard Hot 100, but peaked at number 22 on the Bubbling Under Hot 100 chart.)	—	—	—	—	—	—	—	—	—		Wrld on Drugs
"Transformer" (featuring Nicki Minaj)	2018	— (Note: "Transformer" did not enter the Billboard Hot 100, but peaked at number three on the Bubbling Under Hot 100 chart.)	—	—	—	—	—	—	—	—	—		Wrld on Drugs
"Hard Work Pays Off" (with Juice Wrld)	2018	— (Note: "Hard Work Pays Off" did not enter the Billboard Hot 100, but peaked at number five on the Bubbling Under Hot 100 chart.)	— (Note: "Hard Work Pays Off" did not enter the Hot R&B/Hip-Hop Songs chart, but peaked at number three on the Bubbling Under R&B/Hip-Hop Singles chart.)	—	—	—	—	—	— (Note: "Hard Work Pays Off" did not enter the NZ Top 40 Singles Chart, but peaked at number 35 on the NZ Hot Singles Chart.)	—	—	RIAA: Platinum	Wrld on Drugs
"Splash Warning" (Meek Mill featuring Future, Roddy Ricch, and Young Thug)	2018	77	42	—	—	—	—	—	—	—	—		Championships
"Never Stop"	2019	65	31	—	—	—	—	—	— (Note: "Never Stop" did not enter the NZ Top 40 Singles Chart, but peaked at number 38 on the NZ Hot Singles Chart.)	—	—	RIAA: Platinum	The Wizrd
"Rocket Ship"	2019	79	39	—	—	—	—	—	—	—	—		The Wizrd
"Temptation"	2019	76	38	—	—	—	—	—	—	—	—		The Wizrd
"F&N"	2019	83	42	—	—	—	—	—	—	—	—		The Wizrd
"Call the Coroner"	2019	100	47	—	—	—	—	—	—	—	—		The Wizrd
"Talk Shit Like a Preacher"	2019	— (Note: "Talk Shit Like a Preacher" did not enter the Billboard Hot 100, but peaked at number nine on the Bubbling Under Hot 100 chart.)	— (Note: "Talk Shit Like a Preacher" did not enter the Hot R&B/Hip-Hop Songs chart, but peaked at number three on the Bubbling Under R&B/Hip-Hop Singles chart.)	—	—	—	—	—	—	—	—		The Wizrd
"Promise U That"	2019	— (Note: "Promise U That" did not enter the Billboard Hot 100, but peaked at number one on the Bubbling Under Hot 100 chart.)	49	—	—	—	—	—	—	—	—		The Wizrd
"Stick to the Models"	2019	— (Note: "Stick to the Models" did not enter the Billboard Hot 100, but peaked at number three on the Bubbling Under Hot 100 chart.)	— (Note: "Stick to the Models" did not enter the Hot R&B/Hip-Hop Songs chart, but peaked at number one on the Bubbling Under R&B/Hip-Hop Singles chart.)	—	—	—	—	—	—	—	—		The Wizrd
"Krazy But True"	2019	— (Note: "Krazy But True" did not enter the Billboard Hot 100, but peaked at number 15 on the Bubbling Under Hot 100 chart.)	— (Note: "Krazy But True" did not enter the Hot R&B/Hip-Hop Songs chart, but peaked at number six on the Bubbling Under R&B/Hip-Hop Singles chart.)	—	—	—	—	—	—	—	—		The Wizrd
"Servin Killa Kam"	2019	— (Note: "Servin Killa Kam" did not enter the Billboard Hot 100, but peaked at number 19 on the Bubbling Under Hot 100 chart.)	— (Note: "Servin Killa Kam" did not enter the Hot R&B/Hip-Hop Songs chart, but peaked at number eight on the Bubbling Under R&B/Hip-Hop Singles chart.)	—	—	—	—	—	—	—	—		The Wizrd
"Unicorn Purp" (featuring Young Thug and Gunna)	2019	— (Note: "Unicorn Purp" did not enter the Billboard Hot 100, but peaked at number four on the Bubbling Under Hot 100 chart.)	— (Note: "Unicorn Purp" did not enter the Hot R&B/Hip-Hop Songs chart, but peaked at number two on the Bubbling Under R&B/Hip-Hop Singles chart.)	—	—	—	—	—	—	—	—		The Wizrd
"Goin Dummi"	2019	— (Note: "Goin Dummi" did not enter the Billboard Hot 100, but peaked at number 20 on the Bubbling Under Hot 100 chart.)	— (Note: "Goin Dummi" did not enter the Hot R&B/Hip-Hop Songs chart, but peaked at number nine on the Bubbling Under R&B/Hip-Hop Singles chart.)	—	—	—	—	—	—	—	—		The Wizrd
"Xanax Damage"	2019	98	36	—	—	—	—	—	— (Note: "Xanax Damage" did not enter the NZ Top 40 Singles Chart, but peaked at number 38 on the NZ Hot Singles Chart.)	—	—		Save Me
"St. Lucia"	2019	— (Note: "St. Lucia" did not enter the Billboard Hot 100, but peaked at number 14 on the Bubbling Under Hot 100 chart.)	50	—	—	—	—	—	—	—	—		Save Me
"Please Tell Me"	2019	87	33	—	—	—	—	—	—	—	—		Save Me
"Shotgun"	2019	— (Note: "Shotgun" did not enter the Billboard Hot 100, but peaked at number 23 on the Bubbling Under Hot 100 chart.)	—	—	—	—	—	—	—	—	—		Save Me
"Government Official"	2019	99	37	—	—	—	—	—	— (Note: "Xanax Damage" did not enter the NZ Top 40 Singles Chart, but peaked at number 36 on the NZ Hot Singles Chart.)	—	—		Save Me
"Sup Mate" (Young Thug featuring Future)	2019	70	29	—	—	—	—	—	—	—	—		So Much Fun
"Die for Me" (Post Malone featuring Future and Halsey)	2019	20	11	9	23	21	193	—	—	39	—	RIAA: Platinum; ARIA: Platinum; BPI: Silver; MC: 2× Platinum; RMNZ: Gold	Hollywood's Bleeding
"—" denotes a recording that did not chart or was not released in that territory.

=== 2020s ===
List of other charted and certified songs, with selected chart positions and certifications, showing year released and album name
Title	Year	Peak chart positions										Certifications	Album
Title	Year	US	US R&B /HH	US Rap	AUS	CAN	FRA	IRE	NZ	SWE	UK	Certifications	Album
"Federal Fed" (Moneybagg Yo featuring Future)	2020	— (Note: "Federal Fed" did not enter the Billboard Hot 100, but peaked at number 7 on the Bubbling Under Hot 100 chart.)	50	—	—	—	—	—	—	—	—	RIAA: Gold	Time Served
"Live Off My Closet" (Lil Baby featuring Future)	2020	28	15	11	—	63	—	—	— (Note: "Live Off My Closet" did not enter the NZ Top 40 Singles Chart, but peaked at number 11 on the NZ Hot Singles Chart.)	—	—	RIAA: Gold	My Turn
"Wassup" (Lil Uzi Vert featuring Future)	2020	54	31	—	—	—	—	—	—	—	—		Lil Uzi Vert vs. the World 2
"Lightskin Shit" (DaBaby featuring Future and JetsonMade)	2020	53	21	18	—	—	—	—	— (Note: "Lightskin Shit" did not enter the NZ Top 40 Singles Chart, but peaked at number 11 on the NZ Hot Singles Chart.)	—	—		Blame It on Baby
"Desires" (Drake featuring Future)	2020	27	15	11	—	28	111	—	—	—	—		Dark Lane Demo Tapes
"D4L" (with Drake and Young Thug)	2020	19	12	9	—	17	123	—	— (Note: "D4L" did not enter the NZ Top 40 Singles Chart, but peaked at number seven on the NZ Hot Singles Chart.)	—	—		Dark Lane Demo Tapes
"My Business" (Nav featuring Future)	2020	— (Note: "My Business" did not enter the Billboard Hot 100, but peaked at number 23 on the Bubbling Under Hot 100 chart.)	—	—	—	85	—	—	—	—	—		Good Intentions
"Trapped in the Sun"	2020	53	20	18	—	—	—	—	— (Note: "Trapped in the Sun" did not enter the NZ Top 40 Singles Chart, but peaked at number 34 on the NZ Hot Singles Chart.)	—	—		High Off Life
"HiTek Tek"	2020	71	34	—	—	—	—	—	—	—	—		High Off Life
"Touch the Sky"	2020	81	40	—	—	—	—	—	—	—	—		High Off Life
"Solitaires" (featuring Travis Scott)	2020	32	15	13	—	46	155	62	— (Note: "Solitaires" did not enter the NZ Top 40 Singles Chart, but peaked at number five on the NZ Hot Singles Chart.)	—	59	RIAA: Platinum	High Off Life
"Ridin Strikers"	2020	69	32	—	—	—	—	—	—	—	—		High Off Life
"One of My"	2020	82	41	—	—	—	—	—	—	—	—		High Off Life
"Posted with Demons"	2020	79	38	—	—	—	—	—	—	—	—		High Off Life
"Hard to Choose One"	2020	68	31	—	—	—	—	—	—	—	—	RIAA: Gold	High Off Life
"Harlem Shake" (featuring Young Thug)	2020	84	42	—	—	—	—	—	—	—	—		High Off Life
"Up the River"	2020	— (Note: "Up the River" did not enter the Billboard Hot 100, but peaked at number one on the Bubbling Under Hot 100 Singles chart.)	—	—	—	—	—	—	—	—	—		High Off Life
"Pray for a Key"	2020	— (Note: "Pray for a Key" did not enter the Billboard Hot 100, but peaked at number 11 on the Bubbling Under Hot 100 Singles chart.)	—	—	—	—	—	—	—	—	—		High Off Life
"Too Comfortable"	2020	75	35	—	—	—	—	—	—	—	—	RIAA: 2× Platinum; RMNZ: Gold	High Off Life
"All Bad" (featuring Lil Uzi Vert)	2020	54	21	19	—	—	—	—	— (Note: "All Bad" did not enter the NZ Top 40 Singles Chart, but peaked at number 18 on the NZ Hot Singles Chart.)	—	—	RIAA: Gold	High Off Life
"Outer Space Bih"	2020	— (Note: "Outer Space Bih" did not enter the Billboard Hot 100, but peaked at number 10 on the Bubbling Under Hot 100 Singles chart.)	—	—	—	—	—	—	—	—	—		High Off Life
"Accepting My Flaws"	2020	— (Note: "Accepting My Flaws" did not enter the Billboard Hot 100, but peaked at number two on the Bubbling Under Hot 100 Singles chart.)	—	—	—	—	—	—	—	—	—	RIAA: Gold	High Off Life
"Snitching" (Pop Smoke featuring Quavo and Future)	2020	54	30	—	—	51	122	—	—	—	—		Shoot for the Stars, Aim for the Moon
"Street Sweeper" (Gunna featuring Future)	2020	— (Note: "Street Sweeper" did not enter the Billboard Hot 100, but peaked at number one on the Bubbling Under Hot 100 chart.)	43	—	—	—	—	—	—	—	—		Wunna (Deluxe)
"Never Change" (Trippie Redd featuring Future)	2020	— (Note: "Never Change" did not enter the Billboard Hot 100, but peaked at number five on the Bubbling Under Hot 100 chart.)	41	—	—	—	—	—	— (Note: "Never Change" did not enter the NZ Top 40 Singles Chart, but peaked at number 36 on the NZ Hot Singles Chart.)	—	—		Pegasus
"Stripes Like Burberry" (with Lil Uzi Vert)	2020	46	13	12	—	63	—	—	— (Note: "Stripes Like Burberry" did not enter the NZ Top 40 Singles Chart, but peaked at number 20 on the NZ Hot Singles Chart.)	—	—		Pluto x Baby Pluto
"Marni on Me" (with Lil Uzi Vert)	2020	64	23	21	—	—	—	—	—	—	—		Pluto x Baby Pluto
"Sleeping on the Floor" (with Lil Uzi Vert)	2020	68	26	24	—	—	—	—	—	—	—		Pluto x Baby Pluto
"Real Baby Pluto" (with Lil Uzi Vert)	2020	54	17	16	—	92	—	—	— (Note: "Real Baby Pluto" did not enter the NZ Top 40 Singles Chart, but peaked at number 32 on the NZ Hot Singles Chart.)	—	—		Pluto x Baby Pluto
"Drankin n Smokin" (with Lil Uzi Vert)	2020	31	10	9	—	41	—	—	— (Note: "Drankin n Smokin" did not enter the NZ Top 40 Singles Chart, but peaked at number 14 on the NZ Hot Singles Chart.)	—	—	RIAA: Gold; RMNZ: Gold	Pluto x Baby Pluto
"Million Dollar Play" (with Lil Uzi Vert)	2020	67	25	23	—	—	—	—	—	—	—		Pluto x Baby Pluto
"Plastic" (with Lil Uzi Vert)	2020	86	36	—	—	—	—	—	—	—	—		Pluto x Baby Pluto
"That's It" (with Lil Uzi Vert)	2020	50	14	13	—	69	—	—	— (Note: "That's It" did not enter the NZ Top 40 Singles Chart, but peaked at number 23 on the NZ Hot Singles Chart.)	—	—		Pluto x Baby Pluto
"Bought a Bad Bitch" (with Lil Uzi Vert)	2020	100	43	—	—	—	—	—	—	—	—		Pluto x Baby Pluto
"Rockstar Chainz"	2020	97	40	—	—	—	—	—	—	—	—		Pluto x Baby Pluto
"She Never Been to Pluto" (with Lil Uzi Vert)	2020	— (Note: "She Never Been to Pluto" did not enter the Billboard Hot 100, but peaked at number six on the Bubbling Under Hot 100 chart.)	49	—	—	—	—	—	—	—	—		Pluto x Baby Pluto
"Off Dat" (with Lil Uzi Vert)	2020	— (Note: "Off Dat" did not enter the Billboard Hot 100, but peaked at number 15 on the Bubbling Under Hot 100 chart.)	—	—	—	—	—	—	—	—	—		Pluto x Baby Pluto
"I Don't Wanna Break Up" (with Lil Uzi Vert)	2020	— (Note: "I Don't Wanna Break Up" did not enter the Billboard Hot 100, but peaked at number 12 on the Bubbling Under Hot 100 chart.)	—	—	—	—	—	—	—	—	—		Pluto x Baby Pluto
"Bankroll" (with Lil Uzi Vert)	2020	— (Note: "Bankroll" did not enter the Billboard Hot 100, but peaked at number 19 on the Bubbling Under Hot 100 chart.)	—	—	—	—	—	—	—	—	—		Pluto x Baby Pluto
"Moment of Clarity" (with Lil Uzi Vert)	2020	— (Note: "Moment of Clarity" did not enter the Billboard Hot 100, but peaked at number 14 on the Bubbling Under Hot 100 chart.)	—	—	—	—	—	—	—	—	—		Pluto x Baby Pluto
"Flex Up" (with Lil Yachty and Playboi Carti)	2020	— (Note: "Flex Up" did not enter the Billboard Hot 100, but peaked at number 11 on the Bubbling Under Hot 100 chart.)	37	—	—	—	—	—	— (Note: "Flex Up" did not enter the NZ Top 40 Singles Chart, but peaked at number 25 on the NZ Hot Singles Chart.)	—	—		Lil Boat 3.5
"Teen X" (Playboi Carti featuring Future)	2020	— (Note: "Teen X" did not enter the Billboard Hot 100, but peaked at number 18 on the Bubbling Under Hot 100 chart.)	—	—	—	—	—	—	—	—	—		Whole Lotta Red
"Picasso" (with Migos)	2021	— (Note: "Picasso" did not enter the Billboard Hot 100, but peaked at number two on the Bubbling Under Hot 100 chart.)	47	—	—	—	—	—	—	—	—		Culture III
"N 2 Deep" (Drake featuring Future)	2021	12	11	11	19	24	58	—	—	— (Note: "N 2 Deep" did not enter the Swedish Singellista Chart, but peaked at number one on the Sweden Heatseeker Chart.)	— (Note: "N 2 Deep" did not enter the UK Singles Chart, as chart rules only allow three songs per artist to chart within the top one hundred at a time, but peaked at number 16 on the UK Streaming Chart.)		Certified Lover Boy
"Peepin Out the Window" (with Young Thug and BSlime)	2021	95	38	—	—	—	—	—	—	—	—		Punk
"All Good" (Roddy Ricch featuring Future)	2021	— (Note: "All Good" did not enter the Billboard Hot 100, but peaked at number 11 on the Bubbling Under Hot 100 chart.)	32	22	—	—	—	—	—	—	—		Live Life Fast
"Pushin P" (with Gunna featuring Young Thug)	2022	7	2	2	19	10	—	27	16	96	28	RIAA: Platinum; BPI: Silver; RMNZ: Platinum	DS4Ever
"Petty Too" (Lil Durk featuring Future)	2022	26	9	8	—	52	—	—	— (Note: "Petty Too" did not enter the NZ Top 40 Singles Chart, but peaked at number 26 on the NZ Hot Singles Chart.)	—	—		7220
"I'm Dat Nigga"	2022	10	6	6	—	35	—	—	—	—	—	RIAA: 2× Platinum	I Never Liked You
"For a Nut" (featuring Gunna and Young Thug)	2022	24	14	12	—	52	—	—	—	—	—		I Never Liked You
"Puffin on Zootiez"	2022	4	3	3	84	26	—	66	— (Note: "Puffin on Zootiez" did not enter the NZ Top 40 Singles Chart, but peaked at number six on the NZ Hot Singles Chart.)	—	—	RIAA: 4× Platinum; RMNZ: Platinum	I Never Liked You
"Gold Stacks"	2022	29	16	14	—	59	—	—	—	—	—		I Never Liked You
"Massaging Me"	2022	20	13	11	—	55	—	—	—	—	—	RIAA: Platinum	I Never Liked You
"Chickens" (featuring EST Gee)	2022	26	15	13	—	62	—	—	—	—	—		I Never Liked You
"We Jus Wanna Get High"	2022	45	20	19	—	72	—	—	—	—	—		I Never Liked You
"Voodoo" (featuring Kodak Black)	2022	39	18	16	—	67	—	—	—	—	—		I Never Liked You
"Holy Ghost"	2022	46	21	20	—	77	—	—	—	—	—		I Never Liked You
"The Way Things Going"	2022	60	27	24	—	—	—	—	—	—	—		I Never Liked You
"I'm on One" (featuring Drake)	2022	11	7	7	80	16	—	56	— (Note: "I'm on One" did not enter the NZ Top 40 Singles Chart, but peaked at number nine on the NZ Hot Singles Chart.)	—	50	RIAA: Platinum	I Never Liked You
"Back to the Basics"	2022	58	26	23	—	82	—	—	—	—	—		I Never Liked You
"Like Me" (featuring 42 Dugg and Lil Baby)	2022	— (Note: "Like Me" did not enter the Billboard Hot 100, but peaked at number 15 on the Bubbling Under Hot 100 Singles chart.)	—	—	—	—	—	—	—	—	—	RIAA: 2× Platinum	I Never Liked You
"Beautiful" (DJ Khaled featuring Future and SZA)	2022	29	10	8	—	46	—	—	— (Note: "Beautiful" did not enter the NZ Top 40 Singles Chart, but peaked at number seven on the NZ Hot Singles Chart.)	—	53	RIAA: Gold	God Did
"From Now On" (Lil Baby featuring Future)	2022	42	20	16	—	77	—	—	—	—	—		It's Only Me
"Too Many Nights" (with Metro Boomin featuring Don Toliver)	2022	22	6	3	55	12	107	88	27	—	84	RIAA: Platinum; ARIA: 2× Platinum; BPI: Platinum; MC: Platinum; RMNZ: 2× Platinum; SNEP: Gold	Heroes & Villains
"I Can't Save You (Interlude)" (with Metro Boomin featuring Don Toliver)	2022	55	21	15	—	45	—	—	—	—	—		Heroes & Villains
"Lock on Me" (with Metro Boomin and Travis Scott)	2022	72	27	20	—	54	—	—	—	—	—		Heroes & Villains
"Mad Max" (with Lil Durk)	2022	— (Note: "Mad Max" did not enter the Billboard Hot 100, but peaked at number one on the Bubbling Under Hot 100 Singles chart.)	36	—	—	—	—	—	— (Note: "Mad Max" did not enter the NZ Top 40 Singles Chart, but peaked at number 36 on the NZ Hot Singles Chart.)	—	—		Loyal Bros 2
"Fully Loaded" (with Trippie Redd and Lil Baby)	2023	86	33	—	—	—	—	—	— (Note: "Fully Loaded" did not enter the NZ Top 40 Singles Chart, but peaked at number 22 on the NZ Hot Singles Chart.)	—			Mansion Musik
"Never Imagined" (Lil Durk featuring Future)	2023	59	18	11	—	—	—	—	—	—	—		Almost Healed
"All the Way Live" (with Metro Boomin and Lil Uzi Vert)	2023	61	21	14	—	50	—	—	—	—	—		Spider-Man: Across the Spider-Verse (Soundtrack from and Inspired by the Motion Picture)
"Cars Bring Me Out" (Young Thug featuring Future)	2023	52	16	12	—	71	—	—	—	—	—		Business Is Business
"Telekinesis" (Travis Scott featuring SZA and Future)	2023	26	9	8	19	18	64	38	13	74	31	RIAA: Platinum; ARIA: Gold; BPI: Silver; MC: 2× Platinum	Utopia
"Broad Day" (with Offset)	2023	— (Note: "Broad Day" did not enter the Billboard Hot 100, but peaked at number eight on the Bubbling Under Hot 100 Singles chart.)	49	—	—	—	—	—	— (Note: "Broad Day" did not enter the NZ Top 40 Singles Chart, but peaked at number 23 on the NZ Hot Singles Chart.)	—	—		Set It Off
"That's on You" (Chris Brown featuring Future)	2023	— (Note: "That's on You" did not enter the Billboard Hot 100, but peaked at number 18 on the Bubbling Under Hot 100 Singles chart.)	37	—	—	—	—	—	—	—	—		11:11
"Nicki Hendrix" (Nicki Minaj featuring Future)	2023	— (Note: "Nicki Hendrix" did not enter the Billboard Hot 100, but peaked at number seven on the Bubbling Under Hot 100 Singles chart.)	33	—	—	—	—	—	—	—	—		Pink Friday 2
"Stand on It" (Yeat featuring Future)	2024	— (Note: "Stand on It" did not enter the Billboard Hot 100, but peaked at number one on the Bubbling Under Hot 100 chart.)	42	—	—	91	—	—	—	—	—		2093
"We Don't Trust You" (with Metro Boomin)	2024	8	5	5	—	15	—	—	— (Note: "We Don't Trust You" did not enter the NZ Top 40 Singles Chart, but peaked at number eight on the NZ Hot Singles Chart.)	—	— (Note: "We Don't Trust You" did not enter the UK Singles Chart, as chart rules only allow three songs per artist to chart within the top one hundred at a time, but peaked at number 42 on the UK Streaming Chart.)		We Don't Trust You
"Ice Attack" (with Metro Boomin)	2024	13	8	8	—	25	195	—	—	—	— (Note: "Ice Attack" did not enter the UK Singles Chart, as chart rules only allow three songs per artist to chart within the top one hundred at a time, but peaked at number 99 on the UK Streaming Chart.)		We Don't Trust You
"Claustrophobic" (with Metro Boomin)	2024	24	12	11	—	42	—	—	—	—	—		We Don't Trust You
"Slimed In" (with Metro Boomin)	2024	20	10	9	—	36	—	—	—	—	—		We Don't Trust You
"Magic Don Juan (Princess Diana)" (with Metro Boomin)	2024	27	14	12	—	46	—	—	—	—	—		We Don't Trust You
"Cinderella" (with Metro Boomin and Travis Scott)	2024	6	3	3	40	11	103	29	28	—	20	MC: Platinum; RMNZ: Gold	We Don't Trust You
"Runnin Outta Time" (with Metro Boomin)	2024	36	22	18	—	45	—	—	—	—	—		We Don't Trust You
"Fried (She a Vibe)" (with Metro Boomin)	2024	33	20	17	—	47	—	—	—	—	—		We Don't Trust You
"Ain't No Love" (with Metro Boomin)	2024	41	25	21	—	58	—	—	—	—	—		We Don't Trust You
"Everyday Hustle" (with Metro Boomin and Rick Ross)	2024	38	23	19	—	51	—	—	—	—	—		We Don't Trust You
"GTA" (with Metro Boomin)	2024	40	24	20	—	61	—	—	—	—	—		We Don't Trust You
"Seen It All" (with Metro Boomin)	2024	54	29	25	—	74	—	—	—	—	—		We Don't Trust You
"WTFYM" (with Metro Boomin)	2024	52	28	24	—	65	—	—	—	—	—		We Don't Trust You
"Where My Twin @" (with Metro Boomin)	2024	62	30	—	—	85	—	—	—	—	—		We Don't Trust You
"Drink n Dance" (with Metro Boomin)	2024	51	19	16	—	67	—	—	—	—	—		We Still Don't Trust You
"Out of My Hands" (with Metro Boomin)	2024	41	17	14	—	64	—	—	— (Note: "Out of My Hands" did not enter the NZ Top 40 Singles Chart, but peaked at number 12 on the NZ Hot Singles Chart.)	—	—		We Still Don't Trust You
"Jealous" (with Metro Boomin)	2024	54	21	18	—	89	—	—	—	—	—		We Still Don't Trust You
"This Sunday" (with Metro Boomin)	2024	77	33	—	—	—	—	—	—	—	—		We Still Don't Trust You
"Luv Bad Bitches" (with Metro Boomin and Brownstone)	2024	73	32	—	—	—	—	—	—	—	—		We Still Don't Trust You
"Amazing" (Interlude) (with Metro Boomin)	2024	— (Note: "Amazing" (Interlude) did not enter the Billboard Hot 100, but peaked at number one on the Bubbling Under Hot 100 chart.)	46	—	—	—	—	—	—	—	—		We Still Don't Trust You
"All to Myself" (with Metro Boomin and the Weeknd)	2024	67	28	25	—	90	—	—	—	—	—		We Still Don't Trust You
"Nights Like This" (with Metro Boomin)	2024	81	36	—	—	—	—	—	—	—	—		We Still Don't Trust You
"Came to the Party" (with Metro Boomin)	2024	99	43	—	—	—	—	—	—	—	—		We Still Don't Trust You
"Right 4 You" (with Metro Boomin)	2024	— (Note: "Right 4 You" did not enter the Billboard Hot 100, but peaked at number 13 on the Bubbling Under Hot 100 chart.)	—	—	—	—	—	—	—	—	—		We Still Don't Trust You
"Mile High Memories" (with Metro Boomin)	2024	— (Note: "Mile High Memories" did not enter the Billboard Hot 100, but peaked at number 12 on the Bubbling Under Hot 100 chart.)	—	—	—	—	—	—	—	—	—		We Still Don't Trust You
"Overload" (with Metro Boomin)	2024	— (Note: "Overload" did not enter the Billboard Hot 100, but peaked at number 20 on the Bubbling Under Hot 100 chart.)	—	—	—	—	—	—	—	—	—		We Still Don't Trust You
"Gracious" (with Metro Boomin and Ty Dolla Sign)	2024	— (Note: "Gracious" did not enter the Billboard Hot 100, but peaked at number 23 on the Bubbling Under Hot 100 chart.)	—	—	—	—	—	—	—	—	—		We Still Don't Trust You
"Beat It" (with Metro Boomin)	2024	— (Note: "Beat It" did not enter the Billboard Hot 100, but peaked at number four on the Bubbling Under Hot 100 chart.)	48	—	—	—	—	—	—	—	—		We Still Don't Trust You
"Always Be My Fault" (with Metro Boomin and the Weeknd)	2024	— (Note: "Always Be My Fault" did not enter the Billboard Hot 100, but peaked at number 22 on the Bubbling Under Hot 100 chart.)	—	—	—	—	—	—	—	—	—		We Still Don't Trust You
"One Big Family" (with Metro Boomin)	2024	— (Note: "One Big Family" did not enter the Billboard Hot 100, but peaked at number 25 on the Bubbling Under Hot 100 chart.)	—	—	—	—	—	—	—	—	—		We Still Don't Trust You
"Red Leather" (with Metro Boomin and J. Cole)	2024	39	16	13	—	58	—	—	— (Note: "Red Leather" did not enter the NZ Top 40 Singles Chart, but peaked at number nine on the NZ Hot Singles Chart.)	—	—		We Still Don't Trust You
"Nobody Knows My Struggle" (with Metro Boomin)	2024	100	44	—	—	—	—	—	—	—	—		We Still Don't Trust You
"All My Life" (with Metro Boomin and Lil Baby)	2024	61	25	22	—	83	—	—	—	—	—		We Still Don't Trust You
"Crossed Out" (with Metro Boomin)	2024	— (Note: "Crossed Out" did not enter the Billboard Hot 100, but peaked at number five on the Bubbling Under Hot 100 chart.)	49	—	—	—	—	—	—	—	—		We Still Don't Trust You
"Crazy Clientele" (with Metro Boomin)	2024	— (Note: "Crazy Clientele" did not enter the Billboard Hot 100, but peaked at number two on the Bubbling Under Hot 100 chart.)	47	—	—	—	—	—	—	—	—		We Still Don't Trust You
"Show of Hands" (with Metro Boomin and ASAP Rocky)	2024	71	30	—	—	71	—	—	— (Note: "Show of Hands" did not enter the NZ Top 40 Singles Chart, but peaked at number 10 on the NZ Hot Singles Chart.)	—	—		We Still Don't Trust You
"Streets Made Me a King" (with Metro Boomin)	2024	95	41	—	—	—	—	—	—	—	—		We Still Don't Trust You
"Purple Rain" (Don Toliver featuring Future and Metro Boomin)	2024	— (Note: "Purple Rain" did not enter the Billboard Hot 100, but peaked at number nine on the Bubbling Under Hot 100 Singles chart.)	34	—	—	—	—	—	—	—	—		Hardstone Psycho
"Promotion" (with Kanye West and Ty Dolla Sign as ¥$)	2024	76	21	18	—	73	—	—	— (Note: "Promotion" did not enter the NZ Top 40 Singles Chart, but peaked at number five on the NZ Hot Singles Chart.)	94	—		Vultures 2
"Dead" (with Kanye West and Ty Dolla Sign as ¥$ and Lil Durk)	2024	— (Note: "Dead" did not enter the Billboard Hot 100, but peaked at number 19 on the Bubbling Under Hot 100 Singles chart.)	38	—	—	—	—	—	—	—	—		Vultures 2
"Teflon Don"	2024	21	3	2	—	53	—	—	— (Note: "Teflon Don" did not enter the NZ Top 40 Singles Chart, but peaked at number two on the NZ Hot Singles Chart.)	—	72		Mixtape Pluto
"Lil Demon"	2024	25	5	4	—	59	—	—	— (Note: "Lil Demon" did not enter the NZ Top 40 Singles Chart, but peaked at number three on the NZ Hot Singles Chart.)	—	99		Mixtape Pluto
"Ski"	2024	26	6	5	—	73	—	—	— (Note: "Ski" did not enter the NZ Top 40 Singles Chart, but peaked at number seven on the NZ Hot Singles Chart.)	—	—		Mixtape Pluto
"Ready to Cook Up"	2024	42	11	9	—	—	—	—	—	—	—		Mixtape Pluto
"Plutoski"	2024	29	7	6	—	78	—	—	—	—	—		Mixtape Pluto
"Ocean"	2024	46	12	10	—	—	—	—	—	—	—		Mixtape Pluto
"Press the Button"	2024	61	19	17	—	—	—	—	—	—	—		Mixtape Pluto
"MJ"	2024	68	24	22	—	—	—	—	—	—	—		Mixtape Pluto
"Brazzier"	2024	59	17	15	—	—	—	—	—	—	—		Mixtape Pluto
"Surfing a Tsunami"	2024	42	20	18	—	—	—	—	—	—	—		Mixtape Pluto
"Made My Hoe Faint"	2024	85	30	—	—	—	—	—	—	—	—		Mixtape Pluto
"Told My"	2024	81	28	—	—	—	—	—	—	—	—		Mixtape Pluto
"Oath"	2024	70	26	24	—	—	—	—	—	—	—		Mixtape Pluto
"Lost My Dog"	2024	83	29	—	—	—	—	—	—	—	—		Mixtape Pluto
"Aye Say Gang"	2024	80	27	25	—	—	—	—	—	—	—		Mixtape Pluto
"Dum, Dumb, and Dumber" (with Lil Baby and Young Thug)	2025	16	4	3	—	38	—	—	— (Note: "Dum, Dumb, and Dumber" did not enter the NZ Top 40 Singles Chart, but peaked at number five on the NZ Hot Singles Chart.)	—	46		WHAM
"99" (with Lil Baby)	2025	— (Note: "99" did not enter the Billboard Hot 100, but peaked at number eight on the Bubbling Under Hot 100 Singles chart.)	33	—	—	—	—	—	— (Note: "99" did not enter the NZ Top 40 Singles Chart, but peaked at number 38 on the NZ Hot Singles Chart.)	—	—		WHAM
"Enjoy the Show" (with the Weeknd)	2025	60	16	—	—	46	74	—	—	— (Note: "Enjoy the Show" did not enter the Swedish Singellista Chart, but peaked at number two on the Swedish Heatseeker Chart.)	—		Hurry Up Tomorrow
"Charge Dem Hoes a Fee" (with Playboi Carti and Travis Scott)	2025	49	24	22	—	58	—	—	—	—	58		Music
"Trim" (with Playboi Carti)	2025	46	22	20	—	59	—	—	—	—	60		Music
"They Want to Be You" (Lil Durk featuring Future)	2025	72	19	—	—	—	—	—	—	—	—		Deep Thoughts
"Tsunami" (DJ Snake featuring Future and Travis Scott)	2025	—	—	—	—	—	—	—	— (Note: "Tsunami" did not enter the NZ Top 40 Singles Chart, but peaked at number 22 on the NZ Hot Singles Chart.)	—	—		Nomad
"Bunce Road Blues" (with J. Cole and Tems)	2026	34	13	—	—	55	—	—	—	—	59		The Fall-Off
"Run a Train" (with J. Cole)	2026	33	12	—	—	58	—	—	—	—	—		The Fall-Off
"Ran to Atlanta" (with Drake & Molly Santana)	2026	2	2	—	11	2	—	—	14	31	—		Iceman
"Fukk a Interview"	2026	28	8	5	—	70	—	—	— (Note: "Fukk a Interview" did not enter the NZ Top 40 Singles Chart, but peaked at number 7 on the NZ Hot Singles Chart.)	—	—		The Real Me
"One Two"	2026	33	12	8	—	—	—	—	— (Note: "One Two" did not enter the NZ Top 40 Singles Chart, but peaked at number 11 on the NZ Hot Singles Chart.)	—	—		The Real Me
"No Misery"	2026	54	23	16	—	—	—	—	— (Note: "No Misery" did not enter the NZ Top 40 Singles Chart, but peaked at number 12 on the NZ Hot Singles Chart.)	—	—		The Real Me
"California Girls"	2026	23	5	3	—	55	—	—	— (Note: "California Girls" did not enter the NZ Top 40 Singles Chart, but peaked at number 6 on the NZ Hot Singles Chart.)	—	—		The Real Me
"Tank Top Pluto"	2026	37	14	9	—	98	—	—	—	—	—		The Real Me
"Weight Up"	2026	48	19	13	—	—	—	—	—	—	—		The Real Me
"Konnichiwa"	2026	29	9	6	—	91	—	—	—	—	—		The Real Me
"Trench Coat"	2026	52	22	15	—	—	—	—	—	—	—		The Real Me
"Snow in Skyami"	2026	38	15	10	—	—	—	—	—	—	—		The Real Me
"Build a Bitch"	2026	58	26	18	—	—	—	—	—	—	—		The Real Me
"2018"	2026	83	34	—	—	—	—	—	—	—	—		The Real Me
"Money Over Everything"	2026	64	28	20	—	—	—	—	—	—	—		The Real Me
"Off the Hinge"	2026	76	32	24	—	—	—	—	—	—	—		The Real Me
"If I Could"	2026	93	36	—	—	—	—	—	—	—	—		The Real Me
"Big Moment"	2026	— (Note: "Big Moment" did not enter the Billboard Hot 100, but peaked at number 1 on the Bubbling Under Hot 100 chart.)	39	—	—	—	—	—	—	—	—		The Real Me
"Cast a Spell"	2026	— (Note: "Cast a Spell" did not enter the Billboard Hot 100, but peaked at number 5 on the Bubbling Under Hot 100 chart.)	41	—	—	—	—	—	—	—	—		The Real Me
"Kick"	2026	97	37	—	—	—	—	—	—	—	—		The Real Me
"Hollywood"	2026	— (Note: "Hollywood" did not enter the Billboard Hot 100, but peaked at number 10 on the Bubbling Under Hot 100 chart.)	—	—	—	—	—	—	—	—	—		The Real Me
"Feeling I Give"	2026	— (Note: "Feeling I Give" did not enter the Billboard Hot 100, but peaked at number 18 on the Bubbling Under Hot 100 chart.)	48	—	—	—	—	—	—	—	—		The Real Me
"Alice"	2026	— (Note: "Alice" did not enter the Billboard Hot 100, but peaked at number 12 on the Bubbling Under Hot 100 chart.)	45	—	—	—	—	—	—	—	—		The Real Me
"Eye to Eye"	2026	98	38	—	—	—	—	—	—	—	—		The Real Me
"—" denotes a recording that did not chart or was not released in that territory.

== Guest appearances ==
=== 2009–2019 ===
List of other non-single guest appearances, with other performing artists, showing year released and album name
Title	Year	Other artist(s)	Album
"Stop Playin'"	2009	Big Bank Black	The Demo Tape
"Up"	2010	Rocko	Wildlife
"9 Times Outta Ten"	2010	Rocko	Wildlife
"You Know"	2010	Rocko	Wildlife
"Made of Money"	2011	Doe B	Definition of a Trapper
"Ain't No Way Around It"	2011	DJ Drama	Third Power
"Shinin'"	2011	DJ Scream, 2 Chainz, Stuey Rock, Yo Gotti, Gucci Mane	—N/a
"Green Light"	2011	Trouble	Green Light
"Word 2 My Muva"	2011	Chubbie Baby, Jim Jones	36 Oz.
"Take U Away"	2011	Rocko	Gift of Gab
"Squares Out Your Circle"	2011	Rocko	Gift of Gab
"Power of That P"	2011	Rocko	Gift of Gab
"Hey Ho"	2011	Brianna Perry, Trina	Face Off
"How Bout That"	2011	B.o.B, Trae tha Truth	E.P.I.C. (Every Play Is Crucial)
"Way Too Gone"	2011	Young Jeezy	Thug Motivation 103: Hustlerz Ambition
"I See Ghosts"	2012	T.I., Rocko	Fuck da City Up
"Ring Ring"	2012	Rick Ross	Rich Forever
"Foreign"	2012	Kollosus	Foreign
"Brick Fair"	2012	Gucci Mane	Trap Back
"Sometimes"	2012	Gucci Mane	Trap Back
"Hood Rich Anthem"	2012	DJ Scream, 2 Chainz, Waka Flocka Flame, Yo Gotti, Gucci Mane	Hunger Pains
"Need a Reason"	2012	Kelly Rowland, Bei Maejor	Think Like a Man soundtrack
"Fettuccine"	2012	DJ Green Lantern, Pusha T, Emilio Rojas	Invade the Game
"Turn Up"	2012	Jadakiss, Wale	Consignment
"Don't Judge Me"	2012	Jim Jones	Vampire Life 2: F.E.A.S.T. The Last Supper
"Say No Mo"	2012	Yung Tone	Get Used to My Face 2
"Careless and Reckless"	2012	Gucci Mane, Chill Will	I'm Up
"Everything I Love"	2012	Waka Flocka Flame, Trouble	Triple F Life: Friends, Fans & Family
"I Remember"	2012	Tyga, Game	Well Done 3
"Bitches and Bottles (Let's Get It Started)"	2012	DJ Khaled, Lil Wayne, T.I.	Kiss the Ring
"Ain't Mean to Hurt You"	2012	Twista	Reloaded
"Nun Bout You"	2012	Young Cooley	Cooley, Cooley, Cooley
"Tipsey Love"	2012	Bobby V	Dusk Till Dawn
"Fuck the World"	2012	Gucci Mane	Trap God
"Drug Money"	2012	Yo Gotti	Cocaine Muzik 7: The World Is Yours
"Order Up"	2012	Chubbie Baby, Jadakiss	36 Oz, Part 2
"Back It Up"	2012	Rich Kidz	Straight Like That 3
"Loveeeeeee Song"	2012	Rihanna	Unapologetic
"Yayo"	2012	French Montana, Chinx Drugz	Mac & Cheese 3
"Dolla Signs"	2012	Brianna Perry	Symphony No. 9
"Sorry" (Remix)	2012	Ciara	—N/a
"Dead Broke"	2012	Fredo Santana, Chief Keef, SD	Fredo Kruger
"I Remember"	2012	Game, Young Jeezy	Jesus Piece
"Any Many Miny Mo"	2012	Mike Will Made It, Gucci Mane	Est. In 1989 2.5
"Rich Nigga Talk"	2012	Mike Will Made It	Est. In 1989 2.5
"For My Niggas"	2012	Alley Boy	War Cry
"Dirty"	2012	OG Boo Dirty	Definition of a G
"Jugg Season"	2013	Young Scooter	Street Lottery
"Julio"	2013	Young Scooter	Street Lottery
"Dark Side"	2013	K.E. on the Track	EDM Nation 2
"Nobody Knows"	2013	Juelz Santana	God Will'n
"Ratchet"	2013	Rich Kidz, Chief Keef	—N/a
"Ceelo"	2013	DJ Scream, Wale, Ludacris	The Ratchet Superior
"After Party"	2013	Bangladesh, Cyhi the Prynce, Alley Boy, Fast Life	Ponzi Scheme
"Rules and Regulations"	2013	Casino	Ex Drug Dealer
"No Favors"	2013	Casino	Ex Drug Dealer
"Stacks"	2013	Casino, Bloody Jay	Ex Drug Dealer
"4 the Love"	2013	Casino, Fresh	Ex Drug Dealer
"Keep on Shinin"	2013	Casino	Ex Drug Dealer
"Whip Game"	2013	Casino, Mexico Rann	Ex Drug Dealer
"Just Last Week"	2013	Big K.R.I.T.	King Remembered In Time
"Shake It"	2013	Funkmaster Flex, Busta Rhymes, Trey Songz	Who You Mad At? Me or Yourself?
"Come and See Me"	2013	Thee Unknowns	—N/a
"What You Mean?"	2013	Doe Boy, Soulja Boy	In Free Bandz We Trust
"Where You Go"	2013	Ciara	Ciara
"Million Dollar"	2013	Detail	Rich Gang
"Get That Money"	2013	Drumma Boy, Young Dolph	WTMC3
"Confused"	2013	Gucci Mane	World War 3: Lean
"Rich Friday"	2013	DJ Clue?, Nicki Minaj, Juelz Santana, French Montana	—N/a
"Way I'm Ballin"	2013	Lil Wayne, Mack Maine, Birdman	Dedication 5
"Give U Dat"	2013	Nelly	M.O.
"Tear It Up"	2013	R. Kelly	Black Panties
"My Darlin'"	2013	Miley Cyrus	Bangerz
"Money Ain't No Issue"	2013	Meek Mill, Fabolous	Dreamchasers 3
"Suffering from Success"	2013	DJ Khaled, Ace Hood	Suffering from Success
"Blackball"	2013	DJ Khaled, Ace Hood, Plies	Suffering from Success
"Earth"	2013	Mac Miller	Live from Space
"Anytime"	2014	Ciara	—N/a
"Out My Face"	2014	Young Thug, Rich Homie Quan	—N/a
"What's Wrong"	2014	Figg Panamera, Young Thug	The Independent Game
"Me and My Broken Heart" (Remix)	2014	Rixton	—N/a
"DnF"	2014	P Reign, Drake	Dear America EP
"How Many Times"	2014	Tinashe	Aquarius
"Pajama Pants"	2014	Nick Cannon, Migos, Traphik	White People Party Music
"Ice"	2014	Juicy J, ASAP Ferg	—N/a
"Chimes RMX"	2014	Hudson Mohawke, Pusha T, Travis Scott, French Montana	—N/a
"Who Would've Thought"	2014	Chief Keef	—N/a
"No Tears"	2014	Young Jeezy	Seen It All: The Autobiography
"High Fashion"	2015	Travis Scott	—N/a
"Payback"	2015	Juicy J, Kevin Gates, Sage the Gemini	Furious 7
"Bellucci"	2015	Booba	D.U.C
"Fine Whine"	2015	ASAP Rocky, M.I.A., Joe Fox	At. Long. Last. ASAP
"Jump Out the Face"	2015	Meek Mill	Dreams Worth More Than Money
"Neighborhood Drug Dealer (Remix)"	2015	Rick Ross	—N/a
"Dedicated"	2015	The Game, Sonyae	The Documentary 2
"Simple Things" (Remix)	2015	Miguel, Chris Brown	—N/a
"Take Advantage"	2015	Rick Ross	Black Dollar
"I Don't Play About My Paper"	2015	DJ Khaled, Rick Ross	I Changed a Lot
"I Swear I Never Tell Another Soul"	2015	DJ Khaled, Yo Gotti, Trick Daddy	I Changed a Lot
"I Ride"	2015	DJ Khaled, Rick Ross, Jeezy, Boosie Badazz	I Changed a Lot
"Ball Like This"	2015	L.A. Leakers, Wiz Khalifa, Kid Ink	—N/a
"Dem Scrapz"	2015	Waka Flocka Flame	Salute Me or Shoot Me 5
"Rotation"	2015	Waka Flocka Flame	Salute Me or Shoot Me 5
"You Can See"	2015	Jadakiss	Top 5 Dead or Alive
"MMM"	2015	Puff Daddy, King Los	MMM
"D.O.P.E"	2015	Rick Ross	Black Market
"Cross Me"	2015	Lil Wayne, Yo Gotti	No Ceilings 2
"Aww Man"	2015	Lil Bibby	Free Crack 3
"Royalty"	2015	Jeremih, Big Sean	Late Nights
"U Did It"	2015	Chris Brown	Royalty
"Then I Leave"	2016	J.U.S.T.I.C.E. League, Rick Ross	J.U.S.T.I.C.E. For All
"No Problems"	2016	J.U.S.T.I.C.E. League, Lupe Fiasco	J.U.S.T.I.C.E. For All
"Substitute Everything"	2016	J.U.S.T.I.C.E. League	J.U.S.T.I.C.E. For All
"Slippin"	2016	Meek Mill, Dave East	4/4 Part 2
"General"	2016	Yo Gotti	The Art of Hustle
"Miley Cyrus"	2016	French Montana	Wave Gods
"Grammys"	2016	Drake	Views
"Smoke Break"	2016	Chance the Rapper	Coloring Book
"Hated on Me"	2016	Lil Durk	Lil Durk 2X
"Seven Million"	2016	Lil Uzi Vert	The Perfect LUV Tape
"Know About Me"	2016	Big Sean	—N/a
"Ima Be Alright"	2016	DJ Khaled, Bryson Tiller	Major Key
"Fuck Up the Club"	2016	DJ Khaled, Rick Ross, Yo Gotti, YG	Major Key
"Check On Me"	2016	Fabolous	Summertime Shootout 2
"Doors Open"	2016	2 Chainz	Hibachi for Lunch
"Frozen Water"	2016	Belly	Inzombia
"All I Know"	2016	The Weeknd	Starboy
"Six Feet Under"	2016	The Weeknd	Starboy
"Lights"	2016	550 Madoff	Lights
"Teach Me"	2017	Paul Wall, C Stone	Diamond Boyz
"Get That Money"	2017	Ralo	Famerican Gangster 2
"These Scars"	2017	Meek Mill, Guordan Banks	Wins & Losses
"These Scars"	2017	Zoey Dollaz	M'ap Boule
"Bad Tings (Richmix)"	2017	Zoey Dollaz, Tory Lanez	M'ap Boule
"Everytime"	2017	Wizkid	—N/a
"Don't Judge Me"	2017	Ty Dolla Sign, Swae Lee	Beach House 3
"Don't Sleep On Me"	2017	Ty Dolla Sign, 24hrs	Beach House 3
"Do It Big"	2018	Young Scooter	Tripple Cross
"Tripple Cross"	2018	Young Scooter, Young Thug	Tripple Cross
"Both Sides"	2018	Young Scooter, Young Thug	Tripple Cross
"Real Talk"	2018	Young Scooter	Tripple Cross
"No Question"	2018	Rich The Kid	The World Is Yours
"Buckets"	2018	Rae Sremmurd	SR3MM
"Right Or Wrong"	2018	Youngboy Never Broke Again	Until Death Call My Name
"Sir"	2018	Nicki Minaj	Queen
"What You Want"	2018	Stefflon Don	Secure
"Chanel Junkie"	2018	Moneybagg Yo	RESET
"OKAY"	2018	Moneybagg Yo	RESET
"Zone 6 (Remix)"	2018	Young Nudy, 6LACK	SlimeBall 3
"Splash Warning"	2018	Meek Mill, Roddy Ricch, Young Thug	Championships
"Amazing"	2019	Nav	Bad Habits (Deluxe)
"Interstate 10"	2019	Mustard	Perfect Ten
"Devil In My Bed"	2019	Zoey Dollaz	Last Year Being Humble
"Going Wild"	2019	Yung Bans	Misunderstood
"YEAAA!"	2019	Yung Bans	Misunderstood
"Show & Tell"	2019	Burna Boy	African Giant
"Ammo & Juice"	2019	Young Chop	Still II
"Sup Mate"	2019	Young Thug	So Much Fun
"Die for Me"	2019	Post Malone, Halsey	Hollywood's Bleeding

=== 2020s ===
List of other non-single guest appearances, with other performing artists, showing year released and album name
Title	Year	Other artist(s)	Album
"Live Off My Closet"	2020	Lil Baby	My Turn
"Wassup"	2020	Lil Uzi Vert	Lil Uzi Vert vs. the World 2
"Lightskin Shit"	2020	DaBaby, JetsonMade	Blame It On Baby
"Yeah Yeah"	2020	Lil Gotit, Lil Keed	Hood Baby 2
"Desires"	2020	Drake	Dark Lane Demo Tapes
"D4L"	2020	Drake, Young Thug	Dark Lane Demo Tapes
"Help Me Breathe"	2020	Young Thug	Slime & B
"My Business"	2020	Nav	Good Intentions
"Pardon Me"	2020	Lil Yachty, Mike Will Made It	Lil Boat 3
"Street Sweeper"	2020	Gunna	Wunna (Deluxe)
"Snitching"	2020	Pop Smoke, Quavo	Shoot for the Stars, Aim for the Moon
"Zaza"	2020	Lil Keed	Trapped on Cleveland 3
"Hear No Evil"	2020	Headie One	Edna
"Lift Me Up"	2020	Ty Dolla Sign, Young Thug	Featuring Ty Dolla Sign
"Never Change"	2020	Trippie Redd	Pegasus
"Kidd That Didd"	2020	Trippie Redd, Doe Boy	Pegasus
"Abracadabra"	2020	Sfera Ebbasta	Famoso
"Stella McCartney"	2020	Nav	Emergency Tsunami (Bonus Version)
"Flex Up"	2020	Lil Yachty, Playboi Carti	Lil Boat 3.5
"Black Migo"	2020	Young Scooter, Zaytoven	Zaystreet
"Teen X"	2020	Playboi Carti	Whole Lotta Red
"Superstar"	2021	YSL Records, Young Thug	Slime Language 2
"Mob Ties (Remix)"	2021	YSL Records, Young Thug, Unfoonk, 24Heavy, YTB Trench	Slime Language 2 (Deluxe)
"Picasso"	2021	Migos	Culture III
"Number 2"	2021	KSI, 21 Savage	All Over the Place
"Lick Back Remix"	2021	EST Gee, Young Thug	Bigger Than Life or Death
"Freddy Krueger (Remix)"	2021	YNW Melly, Tee Grizzley	Just a Matter of Slime
"N 2 Deep"	2021	Drake	Certified Lover Boy
"Peepin Out the Window"	2021	Young Thug, Bslime	Punk
"Warm Words in a Cold World"	2021	Rick Ross, Wale	Richer Than I Ever Been
"All Good"	2021	Roddy Ricch	Live Life Fast
"Billi"	2022	EarthGang	Ghetto Gods
"Petty Too"	2022	Lil Durk	7220
"I Want You"	2022	Real Boston Richey	Public Housing
"Bullseye 2"	2022	Real Boston Richey	Public Housing
"Beautiful"	2022	DJ Khaled, SZA	God Did
"From Now On"	2022	Lil Baby	It's Only Me
"Kapitol Denim"	2022	Lucki	Flawless Like Me
"Too Many Nights"	2022	Metro Boomin, Don Toliver	Heroes & Villains
"I Can't Save You (Interlude)"	2022	Metro Boomin, Don Toliver	Heroes & Villains
"Lock on Me"	2022	Metro Boomin, Travis Scott	Heroes & Villains
"Mad Max"	2023	Lil Durk	Loyal Bros 2
"Psycho"	2023	Trippie Redd	Mansion Musik
"Fully Loaded"	2023	Trippie Redd, Lil Baby	Mansion Musik
"Cheatback"	2023	Chlöe	In Pieces
"Activate"	2023	Rae Sremmurd	Sremm 4 Life
"Never Imagined"	2023	Lil Durk	Almost Healed
"All the Way Live"	2023	Metro Boomin, Lil Uzi Vert	Spider-Man: Across the Spider-Verse (Soundtrack from and Inspired by the Motion Picture)
"Cars Bring Me Out"	2023	Young Thug	Business Is Business
Scientists & Engineers	2023	Killer Mike, Andre 3000, Eryn Allen Kane	Michael
"Telekinesis"	2023	Travis Scott, SZA	Utopia
"Back Where It Begins"	2023	Quavo, Takeoff	Rocket Power
"Broad Day"	2023	Offset	Set It Off
"That's on You"	2023	Chris Brown	11:11
"In Luv with the Money"	2023	Rick Ross, Meek Mill	Too Good to Be True
"Nicki Hendrix"	2023	Nicki Minaj	Pink Friday 2
"Press Play"	2024	Nicki Minaj	Pink Friday 2 (Gag City Pluto Edition)
"Stand on It"	2024	Yeat	2093
"Somebody"	2024	A Boogie wit da Hoodie	Better Off Alone
"Purple Rain"	2024	Don Toliver, Metro Boomin	Hardstone Psycho
"Mines"	2024	Mustard, Ty Dolla Sign, Charlie Wilson	Faith of a Mustard Seed
"Promotion"	2024	¥$ (Kanye West and Ty Dolla Sign)	Vultures 2
"Dead"	2024	¥$ (Kanye West and Ty Dolla Sign), Lil Durk	Vultures 2
"Survival of the Fittest"	2024	Polo G	Hood Poet
"BBY GOAT"	2024	Lucki	Gemini!
"Dum, Dumb, and Dumber"	2025	Lil Baby, Young Thug	WHAM
"Enjoy the Show"	2025	The Weeknd	Hurry Up Tomorrow
"Fxck Up the World"	2025	Lisa	Alter Ego
"Charge Dem Hoes a Fee"	2025	Playboi Carti, Travis Scott	Music
"Trim"	2025	Playboi Carti	Music
"Run a Train"	2026	J. Cole	The Fall-Off
"Bunce Road Blues"	2026	J. Cole, Tems	The Fall-Off
"Ran to Atlanta"	2026	Drake, Molly Santana	Iceman
"Eaters"	2026	YSL Records, Young Thug, Travis Scott, Yeat, Tezzus	Slime Language 3
"BA"	2026	Quavo	Qrömelife
"I just realized."	2026	YFN Lucci, Rod Wave	Everything I Said I Am
"LAKEHOUSE."	2026	YFN Lucci	Everything I Said I Am

== Production discography ==
List of songwriting and production credits (excluding guest appearances, interpolations, and samples)
Track(s)	Year	Credit	Artist(s)	Album
5. "Blueberry Yum Yum"	2004	Songwriter	Ludacris	The Red Light District
1. "The Future Is Now"	2011	Producer	Future	Pluto 3D
21. "Wake Up, No Makeup"	2013	Songwriter	Ciara, Mike Will Made It	#MikeWiLLBeenTrill
5. "Loveeeeeee Song"; (featuring Future)	2013	Co-producer (with Luney Tunez and Mex Manny)	Rihanna	Unapologetic
—N/a	2013	Executive producer	Ciara	Ciara
3. "Body Party"	2013	Producer (with Mike Will Made It, Ciara and P-Nasty), vocal producer	Ciara	Ciara
6. "Where'd You Go"; (featuring Future)	2013	Vocal producer	Ciara	Ciara
4. "Paranoid"; (featuring Johnny May Cash)	2013	Songwriter	French Montana	Excuse My French
7. "Love Money Party"; (featuring Big Sean)	2013	Songwriter	Miley Cyrus	Bangerz
3. "Drunk in Love"; (featuring Jay-Z)	2013	Uncredited composer	Beyoncé	BEYONCÉ
6. "New Nu"	2014	Songwriter, vocal producer	Keyshia Cole	Point of No Return
9. "Love Letter"; (featuring Future)	2014	Vocal producer	Keyshia Cole	Point of No Return
10. "Boulders"	2015	Songwriter	Currensy	Canal Street Confidential
—N/a	2016	Executive producer	Zoey Dollaz	Port-au-Prince
—N/a	2016	Executive producer	Zoey Dollaz	October
17. "Nothing Is Promised"	2016	Songwriter	Mike Will Made It, Rihanna	Ransom 2
4. "Feel No Ways"	2016	Songwriter	Drake	Views
10. "Six Feet Under"	2016	Additional vocals, songwriter	The Weeknd	Starboy
7. "We Ball"; (featuring Young Thug)	2017	Producer (with Wheezy)	Meek Mill	Wins & Losses
—N/a	2018	Executive producer	Future, Various artists	Superfly (soundtrack)
Disc 2; 5. "Please Forgive"	2018	Songwriter	Lecrae, Sean Garrett, Crystal Nicole	Superfly (soundtrack)
6. "She Ain't Tell Ya"	2018	Songwriter	Usher, Zaytoven	A
14. "Red Dead"; (featuring Slim Santana)	2019	Songwriter, additional vocals	Yung Bans	Misunderstood
—N/a	2022	Executive producer	Kanye West	Donda 2
—N/a	2022	Executive producer	Jacquees	Sincerely for You
—N/a	2023	Executive producer	Doe Boy	BEEZY
