= Fully Loaded =

Fully Loaded may refer to:

- Fully Loaded (The Velvet Underground album), 1997 American album, an expanded version of Loaded
- WWF Fully Loaded, an annual professional wrestling event held from 1998 to 2000
- Herbie: Fully Loaded, a 2005 film
- Disney's Herbie: Fully Loaded, 2005 racing video game
- Fully Loaded (Lord Kossity album), a 2010 album by Lord Kossity
- Fully Loaded 2, a 2012 album by Lord Kossity
- Fully Loaded!, a programming block formerly featured on the TV channel Challenge
- "Fully Loaded" (song), a 2023 song by Trippie Redd, Future, and Lil Baby from the album Mansion Musik
- Fully Loaded (Che EP), a 2026 extended play by Che.
