= Watch This =

Watch This may refer to:

- "Watch This" (Clay Walker song), 1997
- "Watch This" (Lil Uzi Vert song), 2022
- "Watch This", a song by Future, 2011
- "WATCH THIS!", a song by asteria, 2025
- Watch This, an album by Randy Rogers Band, 2016
- Watch This, a 2016 short film featuring Harrison Page
