= Danger Zone (Lord Kossity album) =

Studio album by Lord Kossity
- Released: 2006
- Genre: Dancehall, Ragga
- Label: U.M.G.

Lord Kossity chronology
Booming System (2005)	Danger Zone (2006)	K.O.S.S. (2008)

Danger Zone is the seventh album by French musician Lord Kossity, released in 2006 on the label U.M.G.

== Track listing ==
No.	Title	Length
1.	"Danger Zone" (intro)	1:15
2.	"Hotel Room" (featuring Chico and Nicky B.)	4:08
3.	"Get the Party On"	3:19
4.	"Booty Call" (featuring Chico)	3:19
5.	"Dans le club"	2:48
6.	"Stand Up" (featuring Nicky B.)	3:13
7.	"Muevelo"	3:02
8.	"Un jour ou l'autre" (featuring Brian and Tony Gold)	3:45
9.	"Gangsta Girl" (featuring Nicky B.)	3:08
10.	"Bounty Killer" (featuring Bounty Killer and Ce'cile)	3:48
11.	"People"	3:37
12.	"Balance Gal" (featuring Don Capelli)	3:00
13.	"War" (featuring Flav'r Unit (remix))	3:36
14.	"Pum Pum Killa"	3:35
15.	"Speed"	4:09
16.	"Athletic" (featuring Elephant Man (remix))	3:02
17.	"Gal a Halla" (featuring Vybz Kartel (remix))	4:04

== Chart ==
Chart (2006)	Peak position
French Albums (SNEP)	38
