= The Real Don =

Studio album by Lord Kossity
- Released: 2001
- Genre: Dancehall, ragga
- Label: Naïve Records

Lord Kossity chronology
Everlord (2000)	The Real Don (2001)	Koss City (2002)

The Real Don is the third album by French musician Lord Kossity, released in 2001 on the label Naïve Records.

== Track listing ==
No.	Title	Length
1.	"Pum pum"	3:28
2.	"Pas dans ça"	3:34
3.	"J'fais mes valises" (featuring Supa John and SunKom)	3:48
4.	"A Who Dat?"	3:07
5.	"Hornet"	3:46
6.	"Good Body Gal" (remix)	3:06
7.	"Lord Ko Megamix"	5:45
8.	"Ruff and Tuff" (featuring Daddy Morry)	3:49
9.	"Dancehall Queen"	3:35
10.	"Joue pas" (featuring Supa John)	4:10
11.	"J'kiffe ton bumpa"	3:55
12.	"Bling bling" (featuring Supa John)	3:34
13.	"L'heure est grave" (featuring SoundKaïl)	4:04
14.	"Hello" (featuring Matinda and Kulu Ganja)	3:59
15.	"Téléphone"	3:25
16.	"Je fly"	4:43
17.	"Corps et âmes"	4:27

== Chart ==
Chart (2001)	Peak position
French Albums (SNEP)	104
