= Booming System =

Studio album by Lord Kossity
- Released: 2005
- Genre: Hip hop
- Label: U.M.G.

Lord Kossity chronology
El Indio (2003)	Booming System (2005)	Danger Zone (2006)

Booming System is the sixth album by French musician Lord Kossity, released in 2005 on the label U.M.G.

== Track listing ==
No.	Title	Length
1.	"Intro"	0:44
2.	"Hey Sexy Wow" (featuring Chico)	3:16
3.	"Booming System" (featuring Junior Lee)	4:18
4.	"Oh No (Judgment Day)" (featuring Kool Shen)	3:36
5.	"J'ai pas le temps"	3:30
6.	"Kartelude" (featuring Vybz Kartel)	0:27
7.	"Dead Dead" (featuring Vybz Kartel)	3:28
8.	"Dolly"	3:25
9.	"Move Inside" (featuring Shaggy and Keisheira)	2:57
10.	"Narvallo"	3:27
11.	"Gifta 'n Vibes" (featuring Selecta Gifta)	0:43
12.	"Seconde Chance" (featuring Jodie Resther)	3:31
13.	"Niagalang" (featuring Nazareken)	3:52
14.	"Athletic" (featuring Elephant Man)	3:56
15.	"Dancehall Soldiers" (featuring Daddy Morry and Krys)	3:07
16.	"Elle est folle"	3:02
17.	"Toutes bonnes"	4:05
18.	"Femme fatale" (featuring Toots)	4:09
19.	"Zone rouge" (featuring Jonas)	8:27

== Chart ==
Chart (2005)	Peak position
French Albums (SNEP)	15
