= Koss City =

Studio album by Lord Kossity
- Released: 2002
- Genre: Hip hop
- Label: Naïve Records

Lord Kossity chronology
The Real Don (2001)	Koss City (2002)	El Indio (2003)

Koss City is the fourth album by French musician Lord Kossity, released in 2002 on the label Naïve Records.

== Track listing ==
No.	Title	Length
1.	"Gangsta"	4:25
2.	"K.T.F. en place"	3:41
3.	"Murda Dem" (featuring Matt Houston)	4:06
4.	"Interlude I"	0:51
5.	"My World"	4:20
6.	"Interlude II"	1:34
7.	"Apocalypse Now"	4:12
8.	"Gunshot" (featuring Doc Gynéco)	4:39
9.	"Le Mack"	4:35
10.	"K.T.F. crew"	4:05
11.	"Interlude III"	0:32
12.	"Hardcore Session"	3:57
13.	"Gladiator II"	4:42
14.	"La vie est une skettel"	4:04
15.	"Bomb Ass"	3:23
16.	"Interlude IV"	1:27
17.	"Na na na"	3:49
18.	"Interlude V"	2:50

== Chart ==
Chart (2002)	Peak position
French Albums (SNEP)	40
