= Cars Bring Me Out =

2025 song by Young Thug featuring Future

Song by Young Thug featuring Future

from the album Business Is Business
- Released: June 23, 2023
- Length: 3:22
- Label: YSL; 300; Atlantic
- Songwriters: Jeffery Williams; Nayvadius Cash; Wesley Glass; Dylan Cleary-Krell
- Producers: Wheezy; Dez Wright

"Cars Bring Me Out" is a rap song by American rapper Young Thug from his third studio album Business Is Business (2023). Featuring American rapper Future, it was produced by Wheezy and Dez Wright.

== Background ==
The instrumental of the song was previously also used in the song "Exclusive" by rapper Drakeo the Ruler.

== Composition ==
The song revolves around the luxury of the rappers. Young Thug uses Auto-Tune in his vocals without melody for the song, and also references making lots of money during the COVID-19 pandemic.

== Critical reception ==
Mark Braboy of Rolling Stone commented Young Thug "has no standout bars, even if his impeccable tag-team chemistry with Future remains in tact[sic]." Dash Lewis of HipHopDX called the song "a typical display of chemistry with Future".

== Charts ==
Chart performance for "Cars Bring Me Out"
Chart (2023)	Peak position
Canada Hot 100 (Billboard)	71
Global 200 (Billboard)	145
US Billboard Hot 100	52
US Hot R&B/Hip-Hop Songs (Billboard)	16
