= All the Way Live (song) =

2023 song by Metro Boomin, Future and Lil Uzi Vert

Song by Metro Boomin, Future and Lil Uzi Vert

from the album Metro Boomin Presents Spider-Man: Across the Spider-Verse (Soundtrack from & Inspired by the Motion Picture)
- Released: June 2, 2023
- Recorded: 2023
- Genre: Hip hop
- Length: 4:05
- Label: Boominati; Republic
- Songwriters: Leland Wayne; Nayvadius Wilburn; Symere Woods; Christopher Townsend; Stephen Feigenbaum; Michael Dean
- Producers: Metro Boomin; Chris Townsend; Johan Lenox; Mike Dean

"All the Way Live" is a song by American record producer Metro Boomin and American rappers Future and Lil Uzi Vert. It was released through Boominati Worldwide and Republic Records as the third track from the former's first soundtrack album, which was for the film Spider-Man: Across the Spider-Verse.

== Background ==
"All the Way Live" was first previewed via Metro Boomin's social media accounts on May 19, 2023, where Future's chorus, and a fragment of his verse were displayed.

== Composition and lyrics ==
"All the Way Live" is a chill synth-filled song. Future gives many references to Marvel characters such as Venom and the Avengers, while Lil Uzi Vert sings from the perspective of Miles Morales from the film Spider-Man: Across the Spider-Verse: "The world's in my hand, got powers in my palm, Look over the city, 'cause I'm on my own, Got no time for minglin', my senses tinglin' Every time I save the world, I think about my friends I wish that I didn't have to pretend, But if I take my mask off, I blend in while".

== Charts ==
Chart performance for "All the Way Live"
| Chart (2023) | Peak position |
|---|---|
| Canada Hot 100 (Billboard) | 50 |
| Global 200 (Billboard) | 97 |
| US Billboard Hot 100 | 61 |
| US Hot R&B/Hip-Hop Songs (Billboard) | 21 |
