= From Now On (Lil Baby song) =

2022 song by Lil Baby featuring Future

Song by Lil Baby featuring Future

from the album It's Only Me
- Released: October 14, 2022
- Genre: Trap
- Length: 2:59
- Label: Quality Control; Motown
- Songwriters: Dominique Jones; Nayvadius Wilburn; Rodrick Moore Jr.; Brytavious Chambers; Shane Lindstrom
- Producers: Brytavious Chambers; Shane Lindstrom

Music video
- "From Now On" on YouTube

"From Now On" is a song by American rapper Lil Baby from his third studio album It's Only Me (2022). It features American rapper Future and was produced by Tay Keith and Murda Beatz.

== Composition ==
"From Now On" is a trap-fuelled song which revolves around Lil Baby changing his image, such as abandoning his lifestyle of "pictures with my Styrofoam" or buying too many houses. The song ends with him rapping in a whisper flow, while insisting the police are listening in and expressing his contempt for them.

== Critical reception ==
Shanté Collier-McDermott of Clash praised the song, writing that "it sounds just how the product of all four talents would, Baby closing out the track with a cool whisper flow." Alphonse Pierre of Pitchfork was more critical of the song, writing, "On 'From Now On,' his bar about buying too many houses stands out solely because it's a wild problem to have, but it's not tied to any emotion." Stephen Kearse of NPR called it an "otherwise boilerplate" song spoiled by Lil Baby dropping his voice to a "conspiratorial whisper", commenting "he sounds electric." Christine Werthman of Billboard said, "What better rapper to welcome back to that bleak, hedonistic party than Future, who joins Lil Baby on 'From Now On'? While Baby says his image revamp requires 'no more pictures with my Styrofoam,' Future is contentedly 'drinkin' out Styrofoam,' unbothered or numb or both, his apathy making Lil Baby sound like a hopeful youth by comparison."

== Music video ==
The official music video was released on October 28, 2022. Directed by Envisioned by Denity, it finds Lil Baby and Future performing the song in the studio, on the streets and in shops. They are seen wearing "colorful", expensive clothing, hats and jewelry. it also features a cameos from Veeze and Lil Uzi Vert.

== Charts ==
Chart performance for "From Now On"
Chart (2022)	Peak position
Canada Hot 100 (Billboard)	77
Global 200 (Billboard)	75
South Africa Streaming (TOSAC)	98
US Billboard Hot 100	42
US Hot R&B/Hip-Hop Songs (Billboard)	20

== Certifications ==
Certifications for "From Now On"
Region	Certification	Certified units/sales
United States (RIAA)	Gold	500,000^{‡}
^{‡} Sales+streaming figures based on certification alone.
