= Run a Train =

2026 song by J. Cole and Future

Song by J. Cole and Future

from the album The Fall-Off
- Released: February 6, 2026
- Recorded: 2016–2026
- Genre: Hip-hop
- Length: 4:02
- Label: Dreamville; Interscope
- Songwriters: Jermaine Cole; Nayvadius Wilburn; Steve Bilodeau; Tyler Williams; Nima Jahanbin; Aaron Goldstein; Mario Dragoi
- Producers: T-Minus; Jūn Tetra & Gldy Jr; Mario Luciano

"Run a Train" is a song by American rappers J. Cole and Future, released on February 6, 2026 from the former's seventh studio album, The Fall-Off. It was produced by T-Minus, Jūn Tetra & Gldy Jr and Mario Luciano.

== Critical reception ==
The song received generally positive reviews. Carl Lamarre of Billboard ranked it as the 12th best song from The Fall-Off, writing "With a fistful of punchlines — including *NSYNC and Rip Hamilton namedrops — Cole's lyrical dagger stays sharp as Future holds it down on hook duties." Alexander Cole of HotNewHipHop remarked "it has a truly gorgeous instrumental. In fact, one thing that is for certain about this album is that the production is out of this world. Of course, so is the rapping. This is another storytelling track from Cole, who is using every single trick in his playbook to craft a beautiful new song. This is absolutely one of those songs that we will have to revisit." Benny Sun of Pitchfork had a negative reaction toward the song, stating "Cole remains a technically strong rapper but often gives the impression he's reading directly out of a notebook. His verses on 'Run a Train' sound like they were designed for one of those videos mapping out MF Doom rhyme schemes in different colors of highlighter." He additionally described it as having a "standout awful Future chorus and a tacky genocide allegory."

== Charts ==
Chart performance for "Run a Train"
Chart (2026)	Peak position
Canada Hot 100 (Billboard)	58
Global 200 (Billboard)	76
New Zealand Hot Singles (RMNZ)	6
Portugal (AFP)	194
South Africa Streaming (TOSAC)	9
US Billboard Hot 100	33
US Hot R&B/Hip-Hop Songs (Billboard)	12
