= Lord Kossity =

French musician (born 1972)

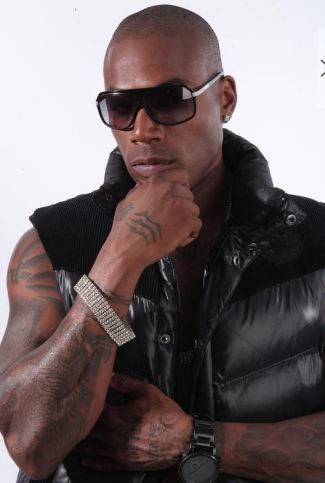

Background information
- Also known as: Lord Ko
- Born: Thierry Moutoussamy; 23 December 1972 (age 53); Paris, France
- Genres: Dancehall, ragga, French hip hop
- Instrument: Vocals
- Years active: 1990–present
- Labels: Killko Records, Naïve Records, U.M.G., Sony Lord Ko Publishing, EPIC, Free World Music
- Website: https://www.youtube.com/@LordKossityOfficiel

Thierry Moutoussamy (French pronunciation: [tjɛʁi mutusami], [tiʁi]; born 23 December 1972), better known as Lord Kossity (/ˈkɒsɪti/), is a French musician. His family is originally from Martinique but he was born in Paris, France and moved back to the French West Indies with his family when he was 11 years old. He began his career in the 1990s with the group Contrast, with his cousin, Dr G-Kill. He started incorporating ragga music with the zouk style later in the 1990s, and has since recorded a number of albums and collaborated with Suprême N.T.M., Vybz Kartel, Shaggy, Bounty Killer, Snoop Dogg, Ice Cube and Elephant Man.

== Discography ==
Studio albums

- An tèt ou sa yé ! (1997) (released only in the French West Indies and reedited in 1998 in metropolitan France under the name L.K. 1: VersaStyle)
- Everlord (2000)
- The Real Don (2001)
- Koss City (2002)
- El Indio (2003)
- Booming System (2005)
- Danger Zone (2006)
- K.O.S.S. (2008)
- K.O.S.S. 02 (2010)
- Fully Loaded (2010)
- Fully Loaded 2 (2013)
- Fully Loaded 2.5 (2013)
- Sexy Boom Boom

Extended plays

- One Man Show (1996)

Compilation albums

- Dancehall Party: Silence (1993) (released only in the French West Indies)
- V.I.P.: Aye chechey' (1995) (released only in the French West Indies)
- Phénoménal (1999)
- Top Shotta (1999)
- Le Best Of (2009)

Singles

- "Vanessa" (1993)
- "Sa rivew'" (1995)
- "Sound Boy Watch It" (1998)
- "Ma Benz" (Suprême N.T.M. featuring Lord Kossity) (1998)
- "Morenas" (2000)
- "Sexe dans la piscine" (2000)
- "Hey Sexy Wow" (featuring Chico) (2005)
- "Dancehall Soldiers" (featuring Krys and Daddy Mory) (2005)
- "Oh No (Judgment Day)" (featuring Kool Shen) (2006)
- "Balance Gal" (featuring Don Capelli) (2006)
- "Booty Call" (featuring Chico) (2006)
- "J'aime" (featuring Clara Morgane) (2007)
- "Hotel Room" (featuring Chico and Nicky B.) (2007)
- "Le respect ne s'achète pas" (featuring Supa John) (2008)
- "So Sexy" (featuring Red Rat and Speedy) (2009)
- "Champion Sound" (2009)
- "Wath love" Remix featuring Shaggy and Akon (2009)
- "Politiquement incorrect" (2010)
- "Roule avec moi" (2010)
- "Sexy Boom Boom" (2011)
