= Fully Loaded (song) =

2023 song by Trippie Redd, Future and Lil Baby

Single by Trippie Redd, Future and Lil Baby

from the album Mansion Musik
- Released: January 19, 2023
- Length: 2:55
- Label: 10K; 1400
- Songwriters: Michael White II; Nayvadius Wilburn; Dominique Jones; Cas van der Heijden; Peter Jideonwo
- Producers: Loesoe; Jideonwo

"Fully Loaded" is a song by American rappers Trippie Redd, Future and Lil Baby. It was released on January 20, 2023, from the Redd's fifth studio album Mansion Musik, and was produced by Loesoe and Peter Jideonwo. SiriusXM The Heat world premiered the song hours before its release.

== Composition ==
Andre Gee of Rolling Stone described Trippie Redd as "belting for blood" in the song.

== Reception ==
Preezy Brown of Vibe called the song a "clear standout" from Mansion Musik. Lil Baby's feature also received a polarizing reaction from fans, some of whom were critical; Twitch streamer Kai Cenat angrily reacted to it on a live stream which went viral, saying that Baby's effort did not live up to the expectations of his career.

== Charts ==
Chart performance for "Fully Loaded"
Chart (2023)	Peak position
New Zealand Hot Singles (RMNZ)	22
US Billboard Hot 100	86
US Hot R&B/Hip-Hop Songs (Billboard)	33
