= Billboard Year-End Hot R&B/Hip-Hop Songs of 2016 =

American music chart

This is a list of Billboard magazine's Top Hot R&B/Hip-Hop Songs of 2016.

| No. | Title | Artist(s) |
|---|---|---|
| 1 | "One Dance" | Drake featuring Wizkid and Kyla |
| 2 | "Panda" | Desiigner |
| 3 | "Work" | Rihanna featuring Drake |
| 4 | "Needed Me" | Rihanna |
| 5 | "Me, Myself & I" | G-Eazy and Bebe Rexha |
| 6 | "Hotline Bling" | Drake |
| 7 | "Too Good" | Drake featuring Rihanna |
| 8 | "Broccoli" | DRAM featuring Lil Yachty |
| 9 | "Here" | Alessia Cara |
| 10 | "The Hills" | The Weeknd |
| 11 | "Controlla" | Drake |
| 12 | "Jumpman" | Drake and Future |
| 13 | "Don't Mind" | Kent Jones |
| 14 | "Don't" | Bryson Tiller |
| 15 | "Low Life" | Future featuring The Weeknd |
| 16 | "For Free" | DJ Khaled featuring Drake |
| 17 | "Starboy" | The Weeknd featuring Daft Punk |
| 18 | "2 Phones" | Kevin Gates |
| 19 | "Oui" | Jeremih |
| 20 | "In the Night" | The Weeknd |
| 21 | "Down in the DM" | Yo Gotti featuring Nicki Minaj |
| 22 | "Luv" | Tory Lanez |
| 23 | "Sorry" | Beyoncé |
| 24 | "Say It" | Tory Lanez |
| 25 | "Sucker for Pain" | Lil Wayne, Wiz Khalifa, and Imagine Dragons with Logic and Ty Dolla Sign featuring X Ambassadors |
| 26 | "Exchange" | Bryson Tiller |
| 27 | "Antidote" | Travis Scott |
| 28 | "Pop Style" | Drake featuring The Throne (Jay-Z and Kanye West) |
| 29 | "679" | Fetty Wap featuring Remy Boyz |
| 30 | "All the Way Up" | Fat Joe and Remy Ma featuring French Montana and Infared |
| 31 | "White Iverson" | Post Malone |
| 32 | "Cut It" | O.T. Genasis featuring Young Dolph |
| 33 | "Back to Sleep" | Chris Brown |
| 34 | "No Limit" | Usher featuring Young Thug |
| 35 | "Wicked" | Future |
| 36 | "Tiimmy Turner" | Desiigner |
| 37 | "Black Beatles" | Rae Sremmurd featuring Gucci Mane |
| 38 | "Really Really" | Kevin Gates |
| 39 | "Father Stretch My Hands" | Kanye West |
| 40 | "Summer Sixteen" | Drake |
| 41 | "No Problem" | Chance the Rapper featuring Lil Wayne and 2 Chainz |
| 42 | "I Got the Keys" | DJ Khaled featuring Jay-Z and Future |
| 43 | "Money Longer" | Lil Uzi Vert |
| 44 | "Uber Everywhere" | MadeinTYO |
| 45 | "That Part" | Schoolboy Q featuring Kanye West |
| 46 | "Best Friend" | Young Thug |
| 47 | "Can't Feel My Face" | The Weeknd |
| 48 | "Hold Up" | Beyoncé |
| 49 | "Come and See Me" | PartyNextDoor featuring Drake |
| 50 | "Juju on That Beat (TZ Anthem)" | Zay Hilfigerrr & Zayion McCall |
| 51 | "Chill Bill" | Rob Stone featuring J. Davis and Spooks |
| 52 | "Pick Up the Phone" | Young Thug and Travis Scott featuring Quavo |
| 53 | "Ooouuu" | Young M.A |
| 54 | "My PYT" | Wale |
| 55 | "1Night" | Lil Yachty |
| 56 | "Again" | Fetty Wap |
| 57 | "Child's Play" | Drake |
| 58 | "Formation" | Beyoncé |
| 59 | "Wake Up" | Fetty Wap |
| 60 | "Caroline" | Aminé |
| 61 | "Famous" | Kanye West |
| 62 | "You Was Right" | Lil Uzi Vert |
| 63 | "Body" | Dreezy featuring Jeremih |
| 64 | "Still Here" | Drake |
| 65 | "Do It Like Me" | DLow |
| 66 | "Promise" | Kid Ink featuring Fetty Wap |
| 67 | "Hit the Quan" | iLoveMemphis |
| 68 | "Wat U Mean (Aye, Aye, Aye)" | Dae Dae |
| 69 | "Might Not" | Belly featuring The Weeknd |
| 70 | "Why You Always Hatin?" | YG featuring Drake and Kamaiyah |
| 71 | "Hype" | Drake |
| 73 | "Kiss It Better" | Rihanna |
| 74 | "Big Rings" | Drake and Future |
| 75 | "My Boo" | Ghost Town DJ's |
| 76 | "Where Ya At" | Future featuring Drake |
| 77 | "Lockjaw" | Rich Homie Quan featuring Problem |
| 78 | "WTF (Where They From)" | Missy Elliott featuring Pharrell Williams |
| 79 | "X" | 21 Savage and Metro Boomin featuring Future |
| 80 | "Sorry Not Sorry" | Bryson Tiller |
| 81 | "Acquainted" | The Weeknd |
| 82 | "No Shopping" | French Montana featuring Drake |
| 83 | "Watch Out" | 2 Chainz |
| 84 | "Gangsta" | Kehlani |
| 85 | "Sex with Me" | Rihanna |
| 86 | "Wishing" | DJ Drama featuring Chris Brown, Skeme and LyQuin |
| 87 | "Back Up" | Dej Loaf featuring Big Sean |
| 88 | "Look Alive" | Rae Sremmurd |
| 89 | "Grammys" | Drake featuring Future |
| 90 | "Law" | Yo Gotti featuring E-40 |
| 91 | "Too Much Sauce" | DJ Esco featuring Future and Lil Uzi Vert |
| 92 | "The Fix" | Nelly featuring Jeremih |
| 93 | "Key to the Streets" | YFN Lucci featuring Migos and Trouble |
| 94 | "Grass Ain't Greener" | Chris Brown |
| 95 | "Fade" | Kanye West |
| 96 | "New Level" | ASAP Ferg featuring Future |
| 97 | "Moolah" | Young Greatness |
| 98 | "With You" | Drake featuring PartyNextDoor |
| 99 | "Stick Talk" | Future |
| 100 | "Might Be" | DJ Luke Nasty |

== See also ==
- 2016 in music
- Billboard Year-End Hot 100 singles of 2016
- Billboard Year-End Hot Rap Songs of 2016
- List of number-one R&B/hip-hop songs of 2016 (U.S.)
