= Billboard Year-End Hot Rap Songs of 2016 =

This is a list of Billboard magazine's Top Hot Rap Songs of 2016.

| No. | Title | Artist(s) |
|---|---|---|
| 1 | "Panda" | Desiigner |
| 2 | "Me, Myself & I" | G-Eazy and Bebe Rexha |
| 3 | "Hotline Bling" | Drake |
| 4 | "Too Good" | Drake featuring Rihanna |
| 5 | "Broccoli" | DRAM featuring Lil Yachty |
| 6 | "Jumpman" | Drake and Future |
| 7 | "Don't Mind" | Kent Jones |
| 8 | "Low Life" | Future featuring The Weeknd |
| 9 | "For Free" | DJ Khaled featuring Drake |
| 10 | "2 Phones" | Kevin Gates |
| 11 | "Sucker for Pain" | Lil Wayne, Wiz Khalifa, and Imagine Dragons with Logic and Ty Dolla Sign featuring X Ambassadors |
| 12 | "Down in the DM" | Yo Gotti |
| 13 | "Antidote" | Travis Scott |
| 14 | "Pop Style" | Drake featuring Jay-Z and Kanye West as The Throne |
| 15 | "679" | Fetty Wap featuring Remy Boyz |
| 16 | "All the Way Up" | Fat Joe, Remy Ma and Jay-Z featuring French Montana and Infared |
| 17 | "White Iverson" | Post Malone |
| 18 | "Cut It" | O.T. Genasis featuring Young Dolph |
| 19 | "Wicked" | Future |
| 20 | "Tiimmy Turner" | Desiigner |
| 21 | "Really Really" | Kevin Gates |
| 22 | "Black Beatles" | Rae Sremmurd featuring Gucci Mane |
| 23 | "Summer Sixteen" | Drake |
| 24 | "I Got the Keys" | DJ Khaled featuring Jay-Z and Future |
| 25 | "Best Friend" | Young Thug |
| 26 | "Money Longer" | Lil Uzi Vert |
| 27 | "Uber Everywhere" | MadeinTYO |
| 28 | "No Problem" | Chance the Rapper featuring Lil Wayne and 2 Chainz |
| 29 | "That Part" | Schoolboy Q featuring Kanye West |
| 30 | "Father Stretch My Hands" | Kanye West |
| 31 | "Juju on That Beat (TZ Anthem)" | Zay Hilfigerrr & Zayion McCall |
| 32 | "Chill Bill" | Rob Stone featuring J. Davis and Spooks |
| 33 | "Ooouuu" | Young M.A |
| 34 | "Again" | Fetty Wap |
| 35 | "Bet You Can't Do It Like Me" | DLOW |
| 36 | "Hit the Quan" | iLoveMemphis |
| 37 | "Pick Up the Phone" | Young Thug and Travis Scott featuring Quavo |
| 38 | "My PYT" | Wale |
| 39 | "Caroline" | Aminé |
| 40 | "Big Rings" | Drake and Future |
| 41 | "Might Not" | Belly featuring The Weeknd |
| 42 | "Where Ya At" | Future featuring Drake |
| 43 | "Wake Up" | Fetty Wap |
| 44 | "Child's Play" | Drake |
| 45 | "WTF (Where They From)" | Missy Elliott featuring Pharrell Williams |
| 46 | "1Night" | Lil Yachty |
| 47 | "Promise" | Kid Ink featuring Fetty Wap |
| 48 | "Wat U Mean (Aye, Aye, Aye)" | Dae Dae |
| 49 | "Hype" | Drake |
| 50 | "Back Up" | Dej Loaf featuring Big Sean |

== See also ==
- 2016 in music
- Billboard Year-End Hot 100 singles of 2016
- Billboard Year-End Hot R&B/Hip-Hop Songs of 2016
- List of Billboard number-one rap singles of 2016
