= List of number-one R&B/hip-hop songs of 2016 (U.S.) =

This page lists the songs that reached number-one on the overall Hot R&B/Hip-Hop Songs chart, the R&B Songs chart (which was created in 2012), and the Hot Rap Songs chart in 2016. The R&B Songs and Rap Songs charts partly serve as distillations of the overall R&B/Hip-Hop Songs chart.

== List of number ones ==
Key
†	Indicates best-charting R&B/Hip-Hop, R&B, Rap and Airplay singles of 2016

Issue date	R&B/Hip-Hop Songs	Artist	R&B Songs	Artist	Rap Songs	Artist	R&B/Hip-Hop Airplay	Artist	Refs.
January 2	"Hotline Bling"	Drake	"The Hills"	The Weeknd	"Hotline Bling"	Drake	"Hotline Bling"	Drake	
January 9	"Hotline Bling"	Drake	"Here"	Alessia Cara	"Hotline Bling"	Drake	"Hotline Bling"	Drake	
January 16	"Hotline Bling"	Drake	"Here"	Alessia Cara	"Hotline Bling"	Drake	"Hotline Bling"	Drake	
January 23	"Hotline Bling"	Drake	"Here"	Alessia Cara	"Hotline Bling"	Drake	"Hotline Bling"	Drake	
January 30	"Here"	Alessia Cara	"Here"	Alessia Cara	"Hotline Bling"	Drake	"Hotline Bling"	Drake	
February 6	"Here"	Alessia Cara	"Here"	Alessia Cara	"Hotline Bling"	Drake	"Say It"	Tory Lanez	
February 13	"Work"	Rihanna featuring Drake	"Work"	Rihanna featuring Drake	"Me, Myself & I"	G-Eazy & Bebe Rexha	"Say It"	Tory Lanez	
February 20	"Summer Sixteen"	Drake	"Work"	Rihanna featuring Drake	"Summer Sixteen"	Drake	"Say It"	Tory Lanez	
February 27	"Work"	Rihanna featuring Drake	"Work"	Rihanna featuring Drake	"Me, Myself & I"	G-Eazy & Bebe Rexha	"Say It"	Tory Lanez	
March 5	"Work"	Rihanna featuring Drake	"Work"	Rihanna featuring Drake	"Me, Myself & I"	G-Eazy & Bebe Rexha	"Don't"	Bryson Tiller	
March 12	"Work"	Rihanna featuring Drake	"Work"	Rihanna featuring Drake	"Me, Myself & I"	G-Eazy & Bebe Rexha	"Don't"	Bryson Tiller	
March 19	"Work"	Rihanna featuring Drake	"Work"	Rihanna featuring Drake	"Me, Myself & I"	G-Eazy & Bebe Rexha	"Work"	Rihanna featuring Drake	
March 26	"Work"	Rihanna featuring Drake	"Work"	Rihanna featuring Drake	"Me, Myself & I"	G-Eazy & Bebe Rexha	"Work"	Rihanna featuring Drake	
April 2	"Work"	Rihanna featuring Drake	"Work"	Rihanna featuring Drake	"Me, Myself & I"	G-Eazy & Bebe Rexha	"Work"	Rihanna featuring Drake	
April 9	"Work"	Rihanna featuring Drake	"Work"	Rihanna featuring Drake	"Me, Myself & I"	G-Eazy & Bebe Rexha	"Work"	Rihanna featuring Drake	
April 16	"Work"	Rihanna featuring Drake	"Work"	Rihanna featuring Drake	"Me, Myself & I"	G-Eazy & Bebe Rexha	"Work"	Rihanna featuring Drake	
April 23	"Work"	Rihanna featuring Drake	"Work"	Rihanna featuring Drake	"Panda" †	Desiigner	"Work"	Rihanna featuring Drake	
April 30	"Work"	Rihanna featuring Drake	"Work"	Rihanna featuring Drake	"Panda" †	Desiigner	"Work"	Rihanna featuring Drake	
May 7	"Panda"	Desiigner	"One Dance" †	Drake featuring Wizkid & Kyla	"Panda" †	Desiigner	"Work"	Rihanna featuring Drake	
May 14	"Panda"	Desiigner	"One Dance" †	Drake featuring Wizkid & Kyla	"Panda" †	Desiigner	"Work"	Rihanna featuring Drake	
May 21	"One Dance" †	Drake featuring Wizkid & Kyla	"One Dance" †	Drake featuring Wizkid & Kyla	"Panda" †	Desiigner	"Work"	Rihanna featuring Drake	
May 28	"One Dance" †	Drake featuring Wizkid & Kyla	"One Dance" †	Drake featuring Wizkid & Kyla	"Panda" †	Desiigner	"Work"	Rihanna featuring Drake	
June 4	"One Dance" †	Drake featuring Wizkid & Kyla	"One Dance" †	Drake featuring Wizkid & Kyla	"Panda" †	Desiigner	"Panda"	Desiigner	
June 11	"One Dance" †	Drake featuring Wizkid & Kyla	"One Dance" †	Drake featuring Wizkid & Kyla	"Panda" †	Desiigner	"Panda"	Desiigner	
June 18	"One Dance" †	Drake featuring Wizkid & Kyla	"One Dance" †	Drake featuring Wizkid & Kyla	"Panda" †	Desiigner	"One Dance"	Drake featuring Wizkid & Kyla	
June 25	"One Dance" †	Drake featuring Wizkid & Kyla	"One Dance" †	Drake featuring Wizkid & Kyla	"Panda" †	Desiigner	"One Dance"	Drake featuring Wizkid & Kyla	
July 2	"One Dance" †	Drake featuring Wizkid & Kyla	"One Dance" †	Drake featuring Wizkid & Kyla	"Panda" †	Desiigner	"One Dance"	Drake featuring Wizkid & Kyla	
July 9	"One Dance" †	Drake featuring Wizkid & Kyla	"One Dance" †	Drake featuring Wizkid & Kyla	"Panda" †	Desiigner	"One Dance"	Drake featuring Wizkid & Kyla	
July 16	"One Dance" †	Drake featuring Wizkid & Kyla	"One Dance" †	Drake featuring Wizkid & Kyla	"Panda" †	Desiigner	"One Dance"	Drake featuring Wizkid & Kyla	
July 23	"One Dance" †	Drake featuring Wizkid & Kyla	"One Dance" †	Drake featuring Wizkid & Kyla	"Panda" †	Desiigner	"One Dance"	Drake featuring Wizkid & Kyla	
July 30	"One Dance" †	Drake featuring Wizkid & Kyla	"One Dance" †	Drake featuring Wizkid & Kyla	"Panda" †	Desiigner	"One Dance"	Drake featuring Wizkid & Kyla	
August 6	"One Dance" †	Drake featuring Wizkid & Kyla	"One Dance" †	Drake featuring Wizkid & Kyla	"Don't Mind"	Kent Jones	"One Dance"	Drake featuring Wizkid & Kyla	
August 13	"One Dance" †	Drake featuring Wizkid & Kyla	"One Dance" †	Drake featuring Wizkid & Kyla	"Panda" †	Desiigner	"One Dance"	Drake featuring Wizkid & Kyla	
August 20	"One Dance" †	Drake featuring Wizkid & Kyla	"One Dance" †	Drake featuring Wizkid & Kyla	"Panda" †	Desiigner	"Controlla"	Drake	
August 27	"One Dance" †	Drake featuring Wizkid & Kyla	"One Dance" †	Drake featuring Wizkid & Kyla	"Sucker for Pain"	Lil Wayne, Wiz Khalifa and Imagine Dragons with Logic and Ty Dolla Sign featuring X Ambassadors	"Controlla"	Drake	
September 3	"One Dance" †	Drake featuring Wizkid & Kyla	"One Dance" †	Drake featuring Wizkid & Kyla	"Too Good"	Drake featuring Rihanna	"Controlla"	Drake	
September 10	"One Dance" †	Drake featuring Wizkid & Kyla	"One Dance" †	Drake featuring Wizkid & Kyla	"Too Good"	Drake featuring Rihanna	"Controlla"	Drake	
September 17	"One Dance" †	Drake featuring Wizkid & Kyla	"One Dance" †	Drake featuring Wizkid & Kyla	"Too Good"	Drake featuring Rihanna	"Controlla"	Drake	
September 24	"Needed Me"	Rihanna	"Needed Me"	Rihanna	"Broccoli"	DRAM featuring Lil Yachty	"Controlla"	Drake	
October 1	"Needed Me"	Rihanna	"Needed Me"	Rihanna	"Broccoli"	DRAM featuring Lil Yachty	"Controlla"	Drake	
October 8	"Broccoli"	D.R.A.M. featuring Lil Yachty	"Needed Me"	Rihanna	"Broccoli"	DRAM featuring Lil Yachty	"Needed Me" †	Rihanna	
October 15	"Starboy"	The Weeknd featuring Daft Punk	"Starboy"	The Weeknd featuring Daft Punk	"Broccoli"	DRAM featuring Lil Yachty	"No Limit"	Usher featuring Young Thug	
October 22	"Starboy"	The Weeknd featuring Daft Punk	"Starboy"	The Weeknd featuring Daft Punk	"Broccoli"	DRAM featuring Lil Yachty	"Needed Me" †	Rihanna	
October 29	"Starboy"	The Weeknd featuring Daft Punk	"Starboy"	The Weeknd featuring Daft Punk	"Broccoli"	DRAM featuring Lil Yachty	"Broccoli"	D.R.A.M. featuring Lil Yachty	
November 5	"Starboy"	The Weeknd featuring Daft Punk	"Starboy"	The Weeknd featuring Daft Punk	"Broccoli"	DRAM featuring Lil Yachty	"Broccoli"	D.R.A.M. featuring Lil Yachty	
November 12	"Starboy"	The Weeknd featuring Daft Punk	"Starboy"	The Weeknd featuring Daft Punk	"Broccoli"	DRAM featuring Lil Yachty	"Broccoli"	D.R.A.M. featuring Lil Yachty	
November 19	"Starboy"	The Weeknd featuring Daft Punk	"Starboy"	The Weeknd featuring Daft Punk	"Broccoli"	DRAM featuring Lil Yachty	"No Problem"	Chance the Rapper featuring Lil Wayne and 2 Chainz	
November 26	"Black Beatles"	Rae Sremmurd featuring Gucci Mane	"Starboy"	The Weeknd featuring Daft Punk	"Black Beatles"	Rae Sremmurd featuring Gucci Mane	"No Problem"	Chance the Rapper featuring Lil Wayne and 2 Chainz	
December 3	"Black Beatles"	Rae Sremmurd featuring Gucci Mane	"Starboy"	The Weeknd featuring Daft Punk	"Black Beatles"	Rae Sremmurd featuring Gucci Mane	"Black Beatles"	Rae Sremmurd featuring Gucci Mane	
December 10	"Black Beatles"	Rae Sremmurd featuring Gucci Mane	"Starboy"	The Weeknd featuring Daft Punk	"Black Beatles"	Rae Sremmurd featuring Gucci Mane	"Black Beatles"	Rae Sremmurd featuring Gucci Mane	
December 17	"Black Beatles"	Rae Sremmurd featuring Gucci Mane	"Starboy"	The Weeknd featuring Daft Punk	"Black Beatles"	Rae Sremmurd featuring Gucci Mane	"Black Beatles"	Rae Sremmurd featuring Gucci Mane	
December 24	"Black Beatles"	Rae Sremmurd featuring Gucci Mane	"Starboy"	The Weeknd featuring Daft Punk	"Black Beatles"	Rae Sremmurd featuring Gucci Mane	"Black Beatles"	Rae Sremmurd featuring Gucci Mane	
December 31	"Black Beatles"	Rae Sremmurd featuring Gucci Mane	"Starboy"	The Weeknd featuring Daft Punk	"Black Beatles"	Rae Sremmurd featuring Gucci Mane	"Black Beatles"	Rae Sremmurd featuring Gucci Mane	

== See also ==
- Billboard Year-End Hot R&B/Hip-Hop Songs of 2016
- List of Billboard Hot 100 number-one singles of 2016
- List of Billboard number-one R&B/hip-hop albums of 2016
