= Billboard Year-End Hot 100 singles of 2016 =

Ranking of recorded music

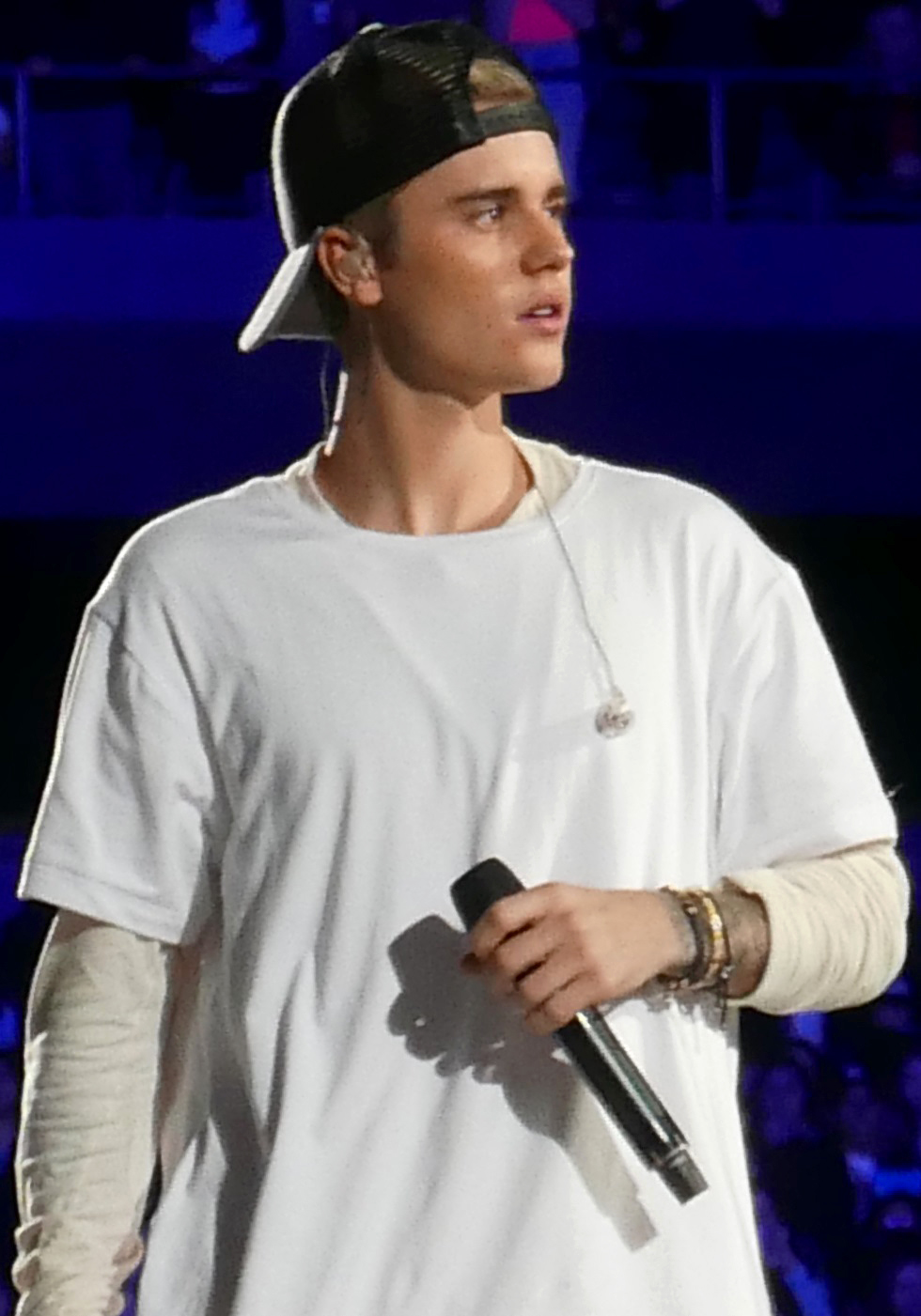
"Love Yourself" by Justin Bieber came in at number one, spending a total of two nonconsecutive weeks at the top position of the Billboard Hot 100 during 2016. "Sorry", which also topped the weekly chart, is ranked at number two on the year-end list. Bieber is only the third artist to have two songs rank in the top-two of the Year-End Hot 100, after the Beatles in 1964 and Usher in 2004.

The Billboard Hot 100 is a chart that ranks the best-performing singles of the United States. Its data, published by Billboard magazine and compiled by Nielsen SoundScan, is based collectively on each single's weekly physical and digital sales, as well as airplay and streaming. At the end of a year, Billboard will publish an annual list of the 100 most successful songs throughout that year on the Hot 100 chart based on the information. For 2016, the list was published on December 8, calculated with data from December 5, 2015 to November 26, 2016. The 2016 list was dominated by Justin Bieber and Drake, who shared the top four spots, marking the first time two artists took up the top four spots since 2009 with Lady Gaga and The Black Eyed Peas.

The list is also notable for being one of five Billboard Year-End lists that featured 14 songs that appeared in the previous year (in this case 2015's) repeat onto to this list. The highest being Adele's "Hello", which with only three weeks being available to count in 2015's chart year, made it on to 2015's list at number 35 and repeat higher at number 7 in 2016's. Only four other year-end lists would repeat the same feat, those being 1997, 2010, 2018 and 2022.

For the first time in 10 years, the year-end number-one single was #1 for five weeks or fewer.

== Year-end list ==
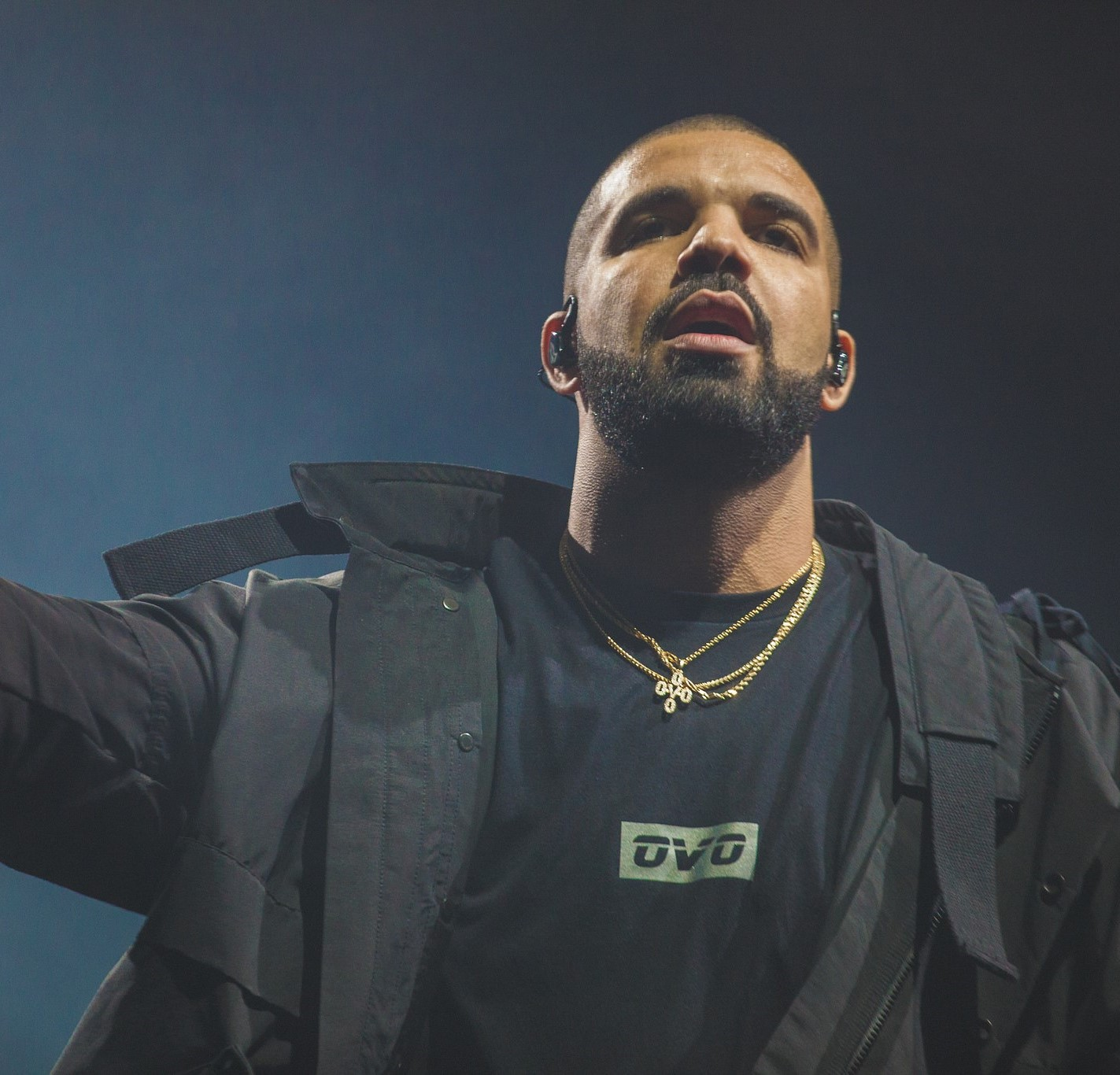
Drake has the most songs out of any artist on the list with eight songs, six of which are in the top 50. His highest-ranking song on the list "One Dance" (at number 3) featuring Wizkid and Kyla became his first number-one song on the Billboard Hot 100 as a lead artist.

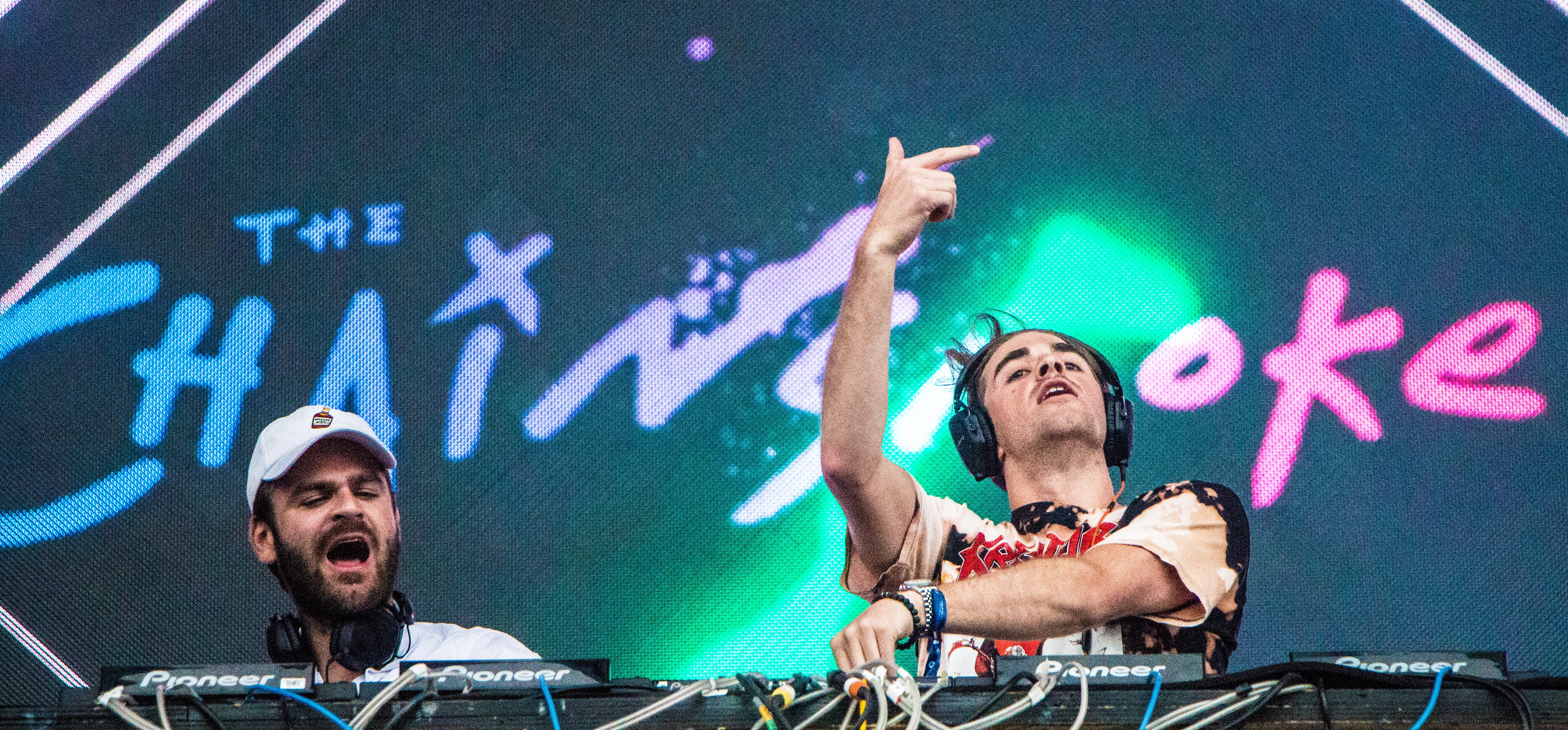
American DJ duo The Chainsmokers has three songs in the top 30. One of them is "Closer" (number 10), which not only became their first number-one song but also the longest-running number-one song of 2016.

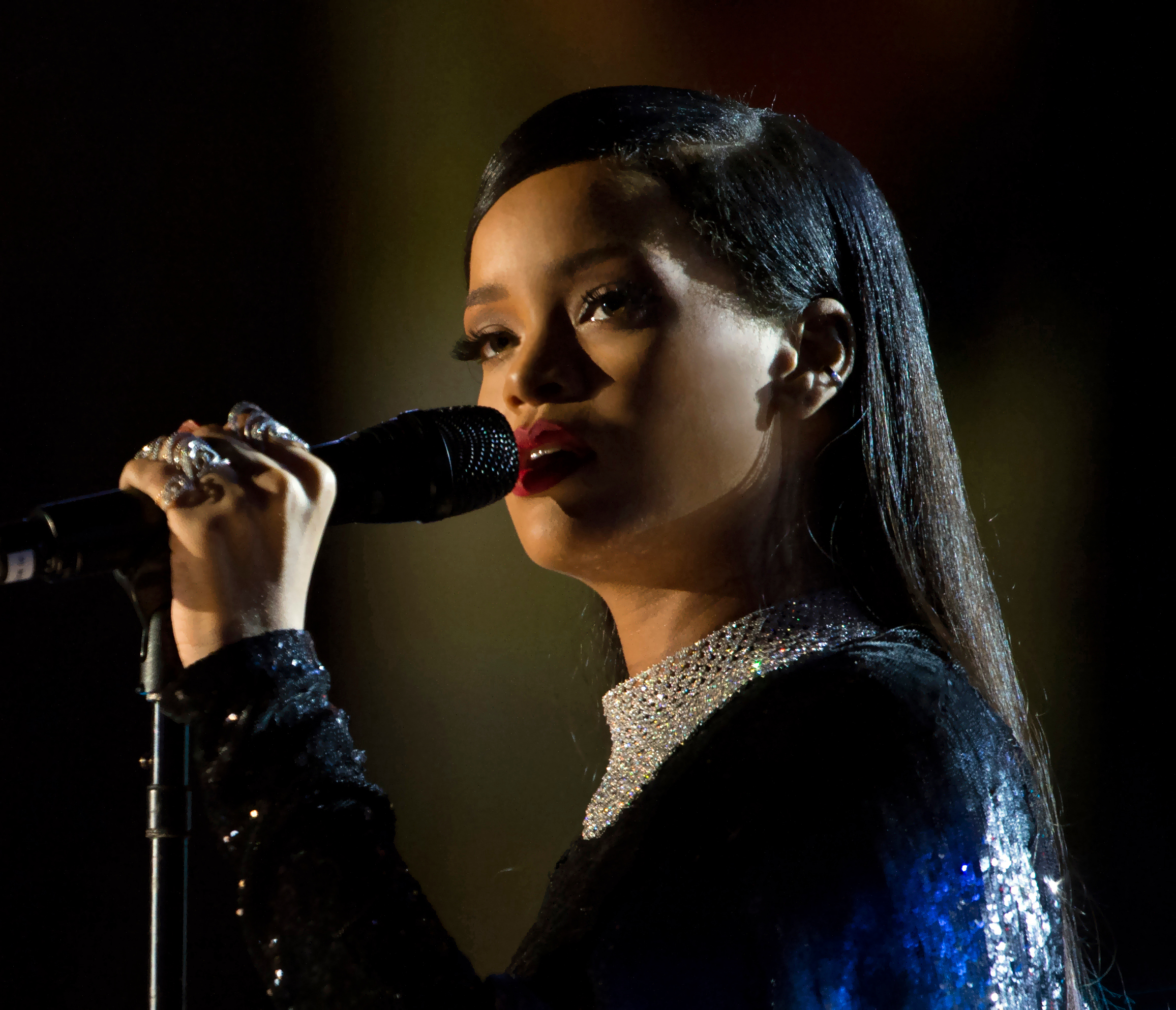
Rihanna has four songs in the top 30 including "Work" at number 4, "Needed Me" at number 13, "This Is What You Came For" at number 17 and "Too Good" at number 29.

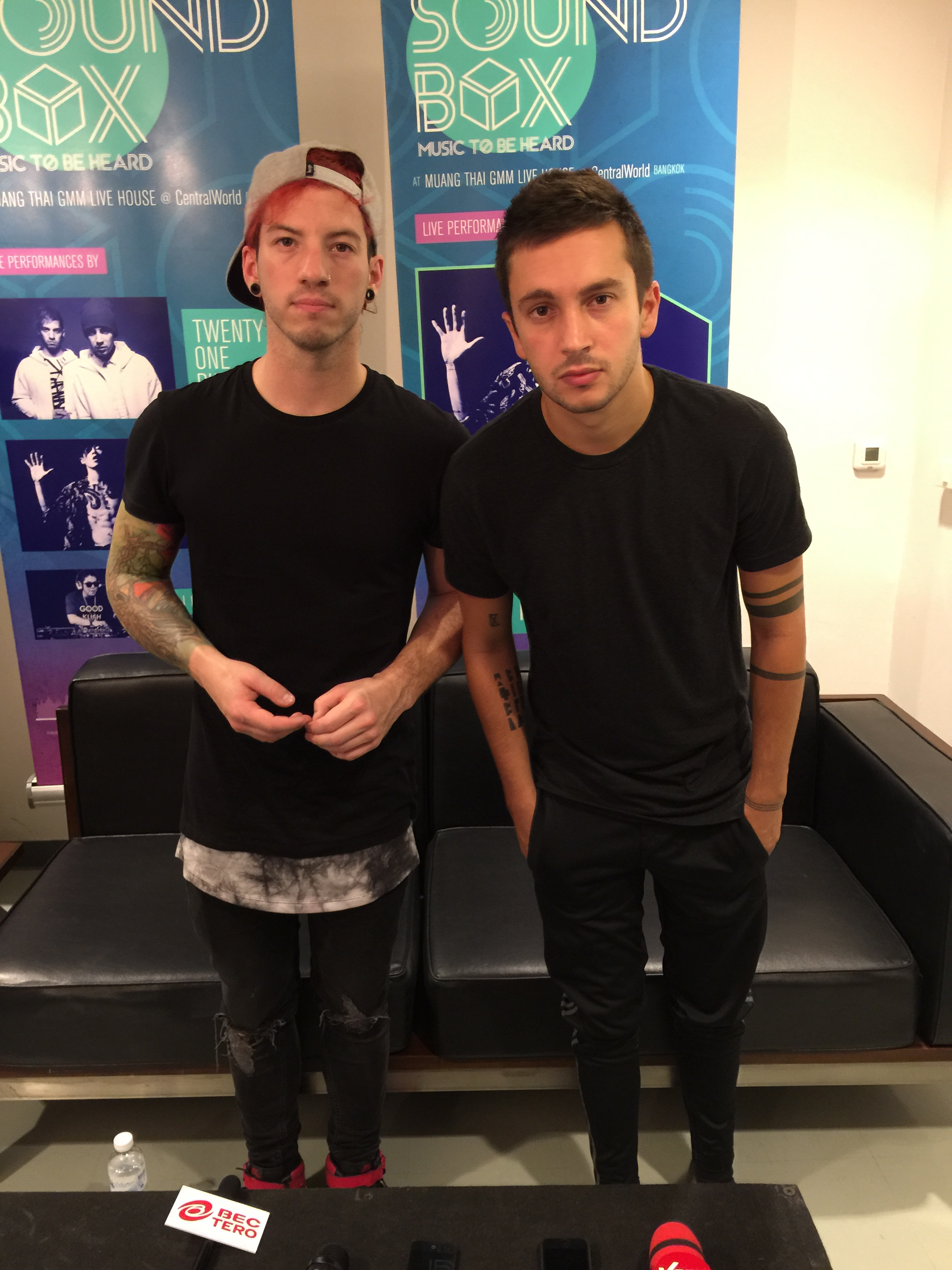
Twenty One Pilots has three songs in the top 25 with "Stressed Out" at number 5, "Ride" at number 20, and "Heathens" at number 21.

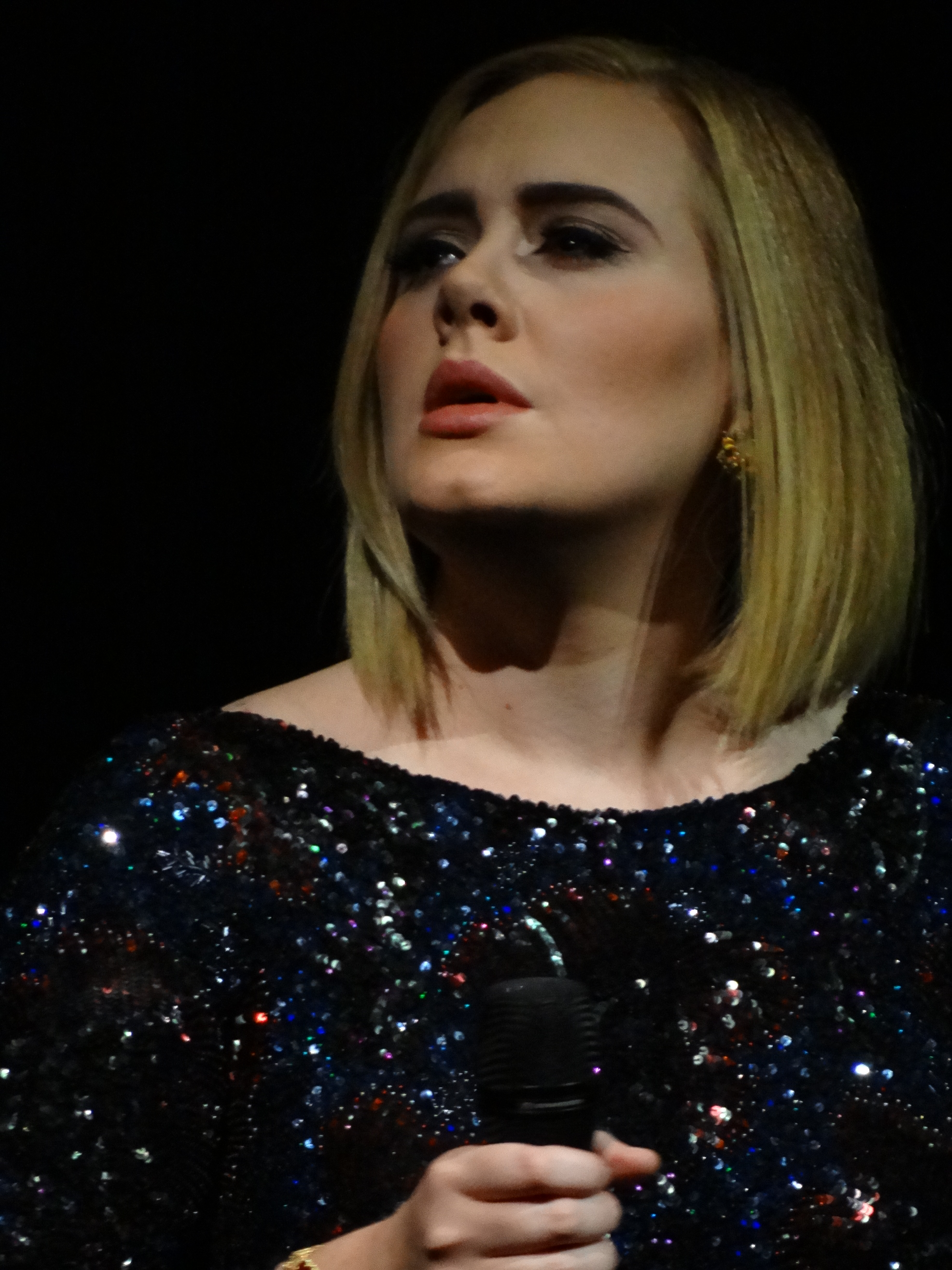
Adele had three of the Hot 100 singles, topped by "Hello" at number 7.

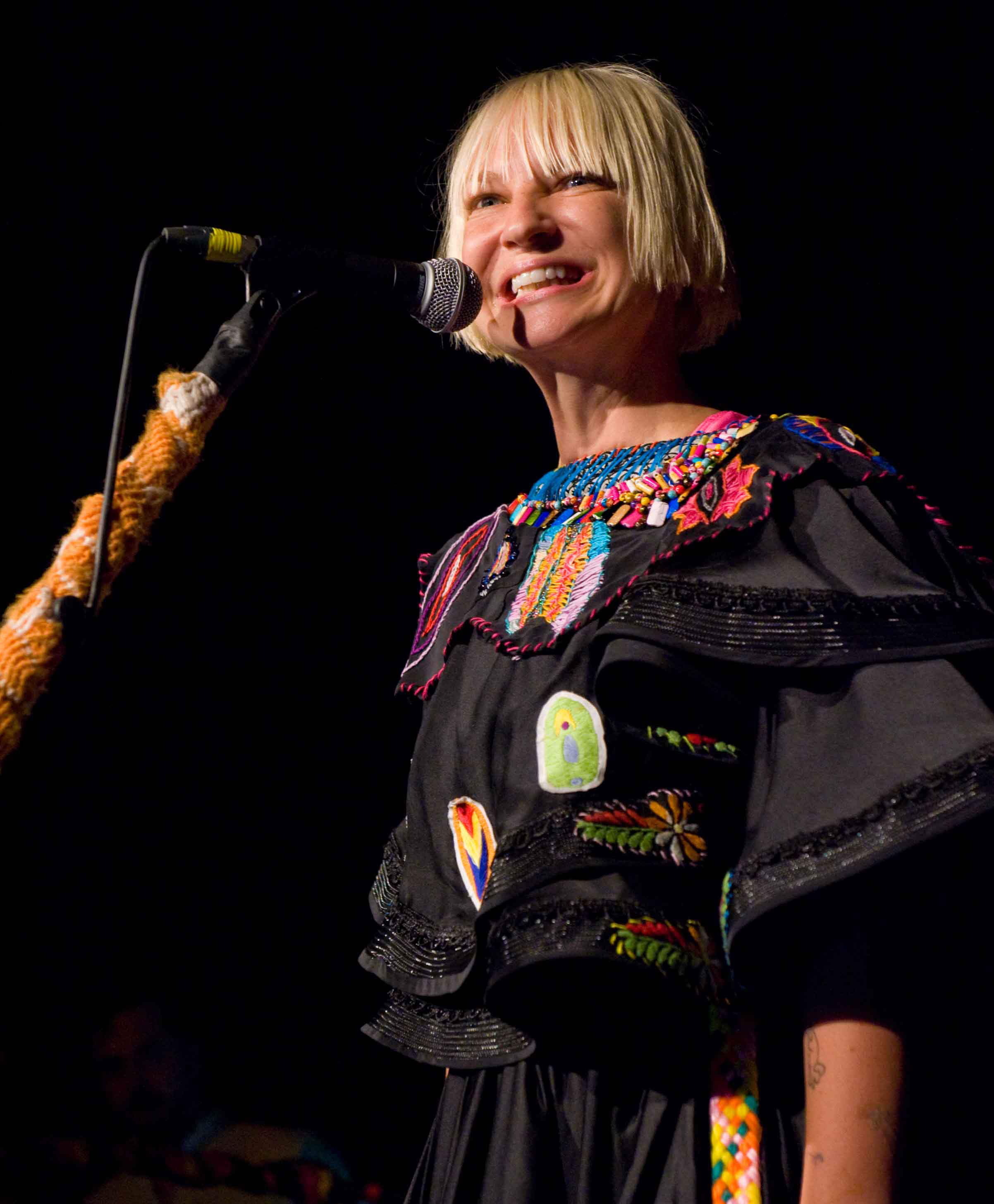
Sia became the first woman over 40 to top the Hot 100 with her first number-one single "Cheap Thrills" (number 11) since Madonna topped the chart with "Music" in 2000.

List of songs on Billboard's 2016 Year-End Hot 100 chart
No.	Title	Artist(s)
1	"Love Yourself"	Justin Bieber
2	"Sorry"	Justin Bieber
3	"One Dance"	Drake featuring Wizkid and Kyla
4	"Work"	Rihanna featuring Drake
5	"Stressed Out"	Twenty One Pilots
6	"Panda"	Desiigner
7	"Hello"	Adele
8	"Don't Let Me Down"	The Chainsmokers featuring Daya
9	"Can't Stop the Feeling!"	Justin Timberlake
10	"Closer"	The Chainsmokers featuring Halsey
11	"Cheap Thrills"	Sia featuring Sean Paul
12	"7 Years"	Lukas Graham
13	"Needed Me"	Rihanna
14	"My House"	Flo Rida
15	"I Took a Pill in Ibiza"	Mike Posner
16	"Work from Home"	Fifth Harmony featuring Ty Dolla Sign
17	"This Is What You Came For"	Calvin Harris featuring Rihanna
18	"Cake by the Ocean"	DNCE
19	"Me, Myself & I"	G-Eazy and Bebe Rexha
20	"Ride"	Twenty One Pilots
21	"Heathens"	Twenty One Pilots
22	"Pillowtalk"	Zayn
23	"Stitches"	Shawn Mendes
24	"Hotline Bling"	Drake
25	"Cold Water"	Major Lazer featuring Justin Bieber and MØ
26	"Send My Love (To Your New Lover)"	Adele
27	"Roses"	The Chainsmokers featuring Rozes
28	"Treat You Better"	Shawn Mendes
29	"Too Good"	Drake featuring Rihanna
30	"Low Life"	Future featuring The Weeknd
31	"What Do You Mean?"	Justin Bieber
32	"The Hills"	The Weeknd
33	"Just Like Fire"	P!nk
34	"Broccoli"	DRAM featuring Lil Yachty
35	"Don't"	Bryson Tiller
36	"Dangerous Woman"	Ariana Grande
37	"Jumpman"	Drake and Future
38	"I Hate U, I Love U"	Gnash featuring Olivia O'Brien
39	"Here"	Alessia Cara
40	"Same Old Love"	Selena Gomez
41	"Controlla"	Drake
42	"Like I'm Gonna Lose You"	Meghan Trainor featuring John Legend
43	"One Call Away"	Charlie Puth
44	"Let It Go"	James Bay
45	"No"	Meghan Trainor
46	"Never Forget You"	Zara Larsson and MNEK
47	"Let Me Love You"	DJ Snake featuring Justin Bieber
48	"Don't Mind"	Kent Jones
49	"H.O.L.Y."	Florida Georgia Line
50	"We Don't Talk Anymore"	Charlie Puth featuring Selena Gomez
51	"Into You"	Ariana Grande
52	"Gold"	Kiiara
53	"Exchange"	Bryson Tiller
54	"679"	Fetty Wap featuring Remy Boyz
55	"Oui"	Jeremih
56	"Hands to Myself"	Selena Gomez
57	"2 Phones"	Kevin Gates
58	"Starboy"	The Weeknd featuring Daft Punk
59	"For Free"	DJ Khaled featuring Drake
60	"Never Be Like You"	Flume featuring Kai
61	"In the Night"	The Weeknd
62	"Me Too"	Meghan Trainor
63	"Ex's & Oh's"	Elle King
64	"Die a Happy Man"	Thomas Rhett
65	"White Iverson"	Post Malone
66	"Close"	Nick Jonas featuring Tove Lo
67	"Unsteady"	X Ambassadors
68	"Sucker for Pain"	Lil Wayne, Wiz Khalifa and Imagine Dragons with Logic and Ty Dolla Sign featuring X Ambassadors
69	"Down in the DM"	Yo Gotti featuring Nicki Minaj
70	"Luv"	Tory Lanez
71	"Sorry"	Beyoncé
72	"Can't Feel My Face"	The Weeknd
73	"Hymn for the Weekend"	Coldplay
74	"Say It"	Tory Lanez
75	"Antidote"	Travis Scott
76	"Lost Boy"	Ruth B
77	"Side to Side"	Ariana Grande featuring Nicki Minaj
78	"Sit Still, Look Pretty"	Daya
79	"Wildest Dreams"	Taylor Swift
80	"Middle"	DJ Snake featuring Bipolar Sunshine
81	"On My Mind"	Ellie Goulding
82	"Pop Style"	Drake featuring Jay-Z and Kanye West (Note: Jay-Z and Kanye West are jointly credited as "The Throne".)
83	"When We Were Young"	Adele
84	"Hide Away"	Daya
85	"Lean On"	Major Lazer and DJ Snake featuring MØ
86	"I Know What You Did Last Summer"	Shawn Mendes and Camila Cabello
87	"All the Way Up"	Fat Joe and Remy Ma featuring French Montana and Infared
88	"Watch Me"	Silentó
89	"Back to Sleep"	Chris Brown
90	"No Limit"	Usher featuring Young Thug
91	"Cut It"	O.T. Genasis featuring Young Dolph
92	"Really Really"	Kevin Gates
93	"All In My Head (Flex)"	Fifth Harmony featuring Fetty Wap
94	"Starving"	Hailee Steinfeld and Grey featuring Zedd
95	"Adventure of a Lifetime"	Coldplay
96	"Humble and Kind"	Tim McGraw
97	"Wicked"	Future
98	"Tiimmy Turner"	Desiigner
99	"See You Again"	Wiz Khalifa featuring Charlie Puth
100	"Perfect"	One Direction

== See also ==
- 2016 in American music
- Billboard Year-End Hot R&B/Hip-Hop Songs of 2016
- Billboard Year-End Hot Rap Songs of 2016
- List of Billboard Hot 100 number-one singles of 2016
- List of Billboard Hot 100 top-ten singles in 2016
