= List of Billboard number-one R&B/hip-hop albums of 2016 =

This page lists the albums that reached number-one on the overall Top R&B/Hip-Hop Albums chart, the R&B Albums chart (which was re-created in 2013), and the Rap Albums chart in 2016. The R&B Albums and Rap Albums charts partly serve as distillations of the overall R&B/Hip-Hop Albums chart.

Note that Billboard publishes charts with an issue date approximately 7–10 days in advance.

== List of number ones ==
Key
| † | Indicates best-charting R&B/Hip-Hop, R&B and Rap albums of 2016 |

| Issue date | R&B/Hip-Hop Albums | Artist(s) | R&B Albums | Artist(s) | Rap Albums | Artist(s) | Refs. |
|---|---|---|---|---|---|---|---|
| January 2 | The Buffet | R. Kelly | The Buffet | R. Kelly | When It's Dark Out | G-Eazy | |
| January 9 | Royalty | Chris Brown | Royalty | Chris Brown | King Push – Darkest Before Dawn: The Prelude | Pusha T | |
| January 16 | Royalty | Chris Brown | Royalty | Chris Brown | When It's Dark Out | G-Eazy | |
| January 23 | Royalty | Chris Brown | Royalty | Chris Brown | When It's Dark Out | G-Eazy | |
| January 30 | Beauty Behind the Madness | The Weeknd | Beauty Behind the Madness | The Weeknd | Straight Outta Compton: Music from the Motion Picture | Soundtrack | |
| February 6 | Straight Outta Compton: Music from the Motion Picture | Soundtrack | Beauty Behind the Madness | The Weeknd | Church Clothes 3 | Lecrae | |
| February 13 | Sex Love & Pain II | Tank | Sex Love & Pain II | Tank | Happy Camper | Hoodie Allen | |
| February 20 | Anti | Rihanna | Anti | Rihanna | Islah | Kevin Gates | |
| February 27 | Evol | Future | Anti | Rihanna | Evol | Future | |
| March 5 | Anti | Rihanna | Anti | Rihanna | To Pimp a Butterfly | Kendrick Lamar | |
| March 12 | The Art of Hustle | Yo Gotti | Anti | Rihanna | The Art of Hustle | Yo Gotti | |
| March 19 | This Unruly Mess I've Made | Macklemore & Ryan Lewis | Anti | Rihanna | This Unruly Mess I've Made | Macklemore & Ryan Lewis | |
| March 26 | Untitled Unmastered | Kendrick Lamar | Anti | Rihanna | Untitled Unmastered | Kendrick Lamar | |
| April 2 | Untitled Unmastered | Kendrick Lamar | Anti | Rihanna | Untitled Unmastered | Kendrick Lamar | |
| April 9 | Anti | Rihanna | Anti | Rihanna | Untitled Unmastered | Kendrick Lamar | |
| April 16 | More Issues Than Vogue | K. Michelle | More Issues Than Vogue | K. Michelle | Slime Season 3 | Young Thug | |
| April 23 | Twenty88 | Twenty88 | Twenty88 | Twenty88 | Twenty88 | Twenty88 | |
| April 30 | Anti | Rihanna | Anti | Rihanna | Hamilton: An American Musical | Original Broadway Cast | |
| May 7 | Layers | Royce da 5'9" | Anti | Rihanna | Hamilton: An American Musical | Original Broadway Cast | |
| May 14 | Lemonade | Beyoncé | Lemonade † | Beyoncé | Therapy Session | NF | |
| May 21 | Views † | Drake | Lemonade † | Beyoncé | Views † | Drake | |
| May 28 | Views † | Drake | Lemonade † | Beyoncé | Views † | Drake | |
| June 4 | Lemonade | Beyoncé | Lemonade † | Beyoncé | Views † | Drake | |
| June 11 | Lemonade | Beyoncé | Lemonade † | Beyoncé | Views † | Drake | |
| June 18 | Lemonade | Beyoncé | Lemonade † | Beyoncé | Views † | Drake | |
| June 25 | Lemonade | Beyoncé | Lemonade † | Beyoncé | Views † | Drake | |
| July 2 | Lemonade | Beyoncé | Lemonade † | Beyoncé | Hamilton: An American Musical | Original Broadway Cast | |
| July 9 | Views † | Drake | Lemonade † | Beyoncé | Views † | Drake | |
| July 16 | Lemonade | Beyoncé | Lemonade † | Beyoncé | Views † | Drake | |
| July 23 | blackSUMMERS'night | Maxwell | blackSUMMERS'night | Maxwell | Views † | Drake | |
| July 30 | Blank Face LP | Schoolboy Q | Lemonade † | Beyoncé | Blank Face LP | Schoolboy Q | |
| August 6 | Lemonade | Beyoncé | Lemonade † | Beyoncé | Hamilton: An American Musical | Original Broadway Cast | |
| August 13 | Everybody Looking | Gucci Mane | Lemonade † | Beyoncé | Everybody Looking | Gucci Mane | |
| August 20 | Major Key | DJ Khaled | The Definition Of... | Fantasia | Major Key | DJ Khaled | |
| August 27 | Lemonade | Beyoncé | Lemonade † | Beyoncé | Major Key | DJ Khaled | |
| September 3 | PartyNextDoor 3 | PartyNextDoor | PartyNextDoor 3 | PartyNextDoor | Fishing Blues | Atmosphere | |
| September 10 | Blonde | Frank Ocean | Blonde | Frank Ocean | I Told You | Tory Lanez | |
| September 17 | Blonde | Frank Ocean | Blonde | Frank Ocean | And the Anonymous Nobody... | De La Soul | |
| September 24 | Birds in the Trap Sing McKnight | Travis Scott | Lemonade † | Beyoncé | Birds in the Trap Sing McKnight | Travis Scott | |
| October 1 | Lemonade | Beyoncé | Lemonade † | Beyoncé | Birds in the Trap Sing McKnight | Travis Scott | |
| October 8 | The Divine Feminine | Mac Miller | Hard II Love | Usher | The Divine Feminine | Mac Miller | |
| October 15 | blackSUMMERS'night | Maxwell | blackSUMMERS'night | Maxwell | Hamilton: An American Musical | Original Broadway Cast | |
| October 22 | A Seat at the Table | Solange | A Seat at the Table | Solange | Hamilton: An American Musical | Original Broadway Cast | |
| October 29 | A Seat at the Table | Solange | A Seat at the Table | Solange | Hamilton: An American Musical | Original Broadway Cast | |
| November 5 | 1992 | The Game | Lemonade † | Beyoncé | 1992 | The Game | |
| November 12 | Rage & The Machine | Joe Budden | Lemonade † | Beyoncé | Hamilton: An American Musical | Original Broadway Cast | |
| November 19 | Trap or Die 3 | Jeezy | Lemonade † | Beyoncé | Trap or Die 3 | Jeezy | |
| November 26 | Here | Alicia Keys | Here | Alicia Keys | Hamilton: An American Musical | Original Broadway Cast | |
| December 3 | We Got It from Here... Thank You 4 Your Service | A Tribe Called Quest | #MyNameIsJoeThomas | Joe | We Got It from Here... Thank You 4 Your Service | A Tribe Called Quest | |
| December 10 | 24K Magic | Bruno Mars | 24K Magic | Bruno Mars | We Got It from Here... Thank You 4 Your Service | A Tribe Called Quest | |
| December 17 | Starboy | The Weeknd | Starboy | The Weeknd | We Got It from Here... Thank You 4 Your Service | A Tribe Called Quest | |
| December 24 | The Hamilton Mixtape | Various Artists | "Awaken, My Love!" | Childish Gambino | The Hamilton Mixtape | Various Artists | |
| December 31 | 4 Your Eyez Only | J. Cole | 24K Magic | Bruno Mars | 4 Your Eyez Only | J. Cole | |

== See also ==
- 2016 in music
- List of Billboard 200 number-one albums of 2016
- List of number-one R&B/hip-hop songs of 2016 (U.S.)
