= 2016 BET Hip Hop Awards =

Annual edition of the awards show

- Date: October 4, 2016
- Location: Atlanta’s Cobb Energy Performing Arts Centre
- Hosted by: DJ Khaled

Television/radio coverage
- Network: BET, MTV, MTV2

The 2016 BET Hip Hop Awards were held on September 17, 2016 and aired on October 4, 2016 at Atlanta’s Cobb Energy Performing Arts Centre. The nominations were announced on August 18, 2016. For a third consecutive year, Drake heads the list of nominations for the BET Hip-Hop Awards. His 14 nods include Album of the Year, Best Live Performer, Lyricist of the Year, Best Hip-Hop Video and three in the Best Collabo, Duo or Group category.

Drake will be going up against other top nominees Future (with 10 nods), DJ Khaled (nine) and Kanye West (eight) in several of those categories. One of the most closely watched races will be Best New Hip-Hop Artist, whose nominees including Anderson .Paak, Bryson Tiller (who won that award and Best Male R&B/Pop Artist at June's BET Awards), Chance the Rapper, Desiigner and Tory Lanez.

== Performances ==
- Gucci Mane - "First Day Out" and "1st Day Out tha Feds" plus "Last Time" featuring Travis Scott and "Pick up the Phone featuring Young Thug & Quavo
- Dae Dae – "Wat U Mean (Aye, Aye, Aye)"
- DRAM featuring Lil Yachty – "One Night" and "Broccoli"
- O.T. Genasis – "Push It" and "Cut It"
- Young M.A – "OOOUUU"
- Lil Uzi Vert – "Money Longer"
- 21 Savage – "X"
- Isaiah Rashad – "Tity and Dolla"
- T.I. – "We Will Not"
- Desiigner – "Tiimmy Turner"
- Jalen Jackson - "Panda"

== Cyphers ==
- Cypher 1 – Peedi Crakk, Neef, Omillio Sparks, Freeway & Beanie Sigel of State Property
- Cypher 2 – Don Q, Russ, A Boogie Wit Da Hoodie, Kent Jones & Nick Grant
- Cypher 3 – Sam Black, Ms. Jade, Kur, Dave East & Young M.A
- Live Cypher – Oswin Benjamin, Locksmith & M-1 & Stic of Dead Prez
- Cypher 4 – Mike Biv, Bre-Z, Yazz The Greatest & Big Ron DeVoe
- Cypher 5 – Aaron Cook$, 3D Na'Tee, Rain 910, Consequence & Jidenna
- Cypher 6 – Lil Wayne & Chocolate Droppa (a.k.a. Kevin Hart)

== Winners and nominations ==
=== Best Hip Hop Video ===
Drake – "Hotline Bling"

- 2 Chainz – "Watch Out"
- Desiigner – "Panda"
- DJ Khaled featuring Jay Z & Future – "I Got the Keys"
- Fat Joe & Remy Ma featuring French Montana & Infared – "All the Way Up"
- Kanye West featuring Rihanna – "Famous"

=== Best Collabo, Duo or Group ===
Fat Joe & Remy Ma featuring French Montana & Infared – "All the Way Up"

- Drake featuring Wizkid & Kyla – "One Dance"
- Drake & Future – "Jumpman"
- DJ Khaled featuring Jay Z & Future – "I Got the Keys"
- DJ Khaled featuring Drake – "For Free"

=== Best Live Performer ===
Kendrick Lamar

- Drake
- Future
- J. Cole
- Kanye West

=== Lyricist of the Year ===
Kendrick Lamar

- Chance the Rapper
- Drake
- J. Cole
- Kanye West

=== Video Director of the Year ===
Director X

- Benny Boom
- Colin Tilley
- Hype Williams
- Kanye West

=== DJ of the Year ===
DJ Khaled

- DJ Drama
- DJ Envy
- DJ Esco
- DJ Mustard

=== Producer of the Year ===
Metro Boomin

- DJ Mustard
- Dr. Dre
- Mike WiLL Made It
- Pharrell
- Mario Judah

=== MVP of the Year ===
DJ Khaled

- Drake
- Future
- Kanye West
- Kendrick Lamar

=== Track of the Year ===
Only the producer of the track nominated in this category.

"All the Way Up" – Produced by Cool & Dre and Edsclusive (Fat Joe & Remy Ma featuring French Montana & Infared)

- "Controlla" – Produced by Boi-1da (Drake)
- "Hotline Bling" – Produced by Nineteen85 (Drake)
- "I Got the Keys" – Produced by Southside (DJ Khaled featuring Jay Z & Future)
- "Panda" – Produced by Menace (Desiigner)

=== Album of the Year ===
Drake – Views

- DJ Khaled – I Changed a Lot
- Dr. Dre – Compton
- Fetty Wap – Fetty Wap
- Future – DS2
- Kanye West – The Life of Pablo

=== Best New Hip Hop Artist ===
Chance the Rapper

- Anderson .Paak
- Bryson Tiller
- Desiigner
- Tory Lanez

=== Hustler of the Year ===
DJ Khaled

- Drake
- Future
- Jay Z
- Kanye West

=== Made-You-Look Award ===
Kanye West

- A$AP Rocky
- Drake
- Future
- Nicki Minaj

=== Best Mixtape ===
Chance the Rapper – Coloring Book

- French Montana – Wave Gods (Hosted by Max B)
- Future – Purple Reign
- Lil Uzi Vert – Lil Uzi Vert vs. the World
- Young Thug – Slime Season 3

=== Sweet 16: Best Featured Verse ===
Kendrick Lamar – "Freedom" (Beyoncé featuring Kendrick Lamar)

- 2 Chainz – "No Problem" (Chance the Rapper featuring Lil Wayne & 2 Chainz)
- Drake – "Work" (Rihanna featuring Drake)
- Kodak Black – "Lockjaw" (French Montana featuring Kodak Black)
- Nicki Minaj – "Down in the DM (Remix)" (Yo Gotti featuring Nicki Minaj)

=== Impact Track ===
J. Cole – "Love Yourz"

- Jay Z – "Spiritual"
- Jidenna – "Long Live the Chief"
- Raury – "Trap Tears"
- Sir the Baptist featuring ChurchPeople – "Raise Hell"

=== People's Champ Award ===
Travis Scott – "Antidote"

- Desiigner – "Panda"
- DJ Khaled featuring Drake – "For Free"
- Fat Joe & Remy Ma featuring French Montana & Infared – "All the Way Up"
- O.T. Genasis featuring Young Dolph – "Cut It"
- Young Thug – "Best Friend"
