= Lean and Dabb =

Single by iLoveMemphis

from the album The TurnUp Kid - EP
- Released: November 10, 2015
- Recorded: 2015
- Genre: Hip hop
- Length: 3:57
- Label: Rush Hour; Palm Tree
- Songwriter: Richard Colbert
- Producer: Buck Nasty

iLoveMemphis singles chronology
"Hit the Quan" (2015)	"Lean and Dabb" (2015)	"Bang Challenge" (2016)

Music video
- "Lean and Dabb" on YouTube

"Lean and Dabb" is a song by American rapper iLoveMemphis released on November 10, 2015.

== Music video ==
The song's accompanying music video premiered on January 25, 2016, on iLoveMemphis's YouTube account on YouTube.

== Commercial performance ==
"Lean and Dabb" debuted at number 98 on the Billboard Hot 100 for the chart dated February 6, 2016.

== Charts ==
Chart (2016)	Peak position
US Billboard Hot 100	98
US Hot R&B/Hip-Hop Songs (Billboard)	29
