= Don't Wait for It =

2017 album by Rob Stone

Studio album by Rob $tone
- Released: October 20, 2017
- Studio: Westlake Studios, Los Angeles; Paramount Studios, Los Angeles; PatchWerk Recording Studios, Atlanta Georgia; AIRBNB @ SXSW 2017, Austin, Texas Some Hotel Room, Beverly Hills, California; Rob $tone Home Studio, San Diego, California
- Genre: Hip-hop
- Length: 51:58
- Label: Grove Town Records LLC
- Producer: Zaytoven; ID Labs; Cream Wallo; Money Montage; Dre Native; DJ Wes; CashMoneyAP; Ricci Riera; HUMbeats; 2AM; Chris Rose; Malik Burgers

Don't Wait for It is the debut studio album by American hip-hop recording artist Rob Stone, released on October 20, 2017, under Grove Town Records LLC. The album features guest appearances from Gucci Mane, Meechy Darko, Malik Burgers, and more. The album's production was handled by Zaytoven, CashMoneyAP, Ricci Riera, and more.

== Track listing ==
No.	Title	Producer(s)	Length
1.	"Black Man 4x (Intro)"		1:54
2.	"Little Piggy" (featuring Meechy Darko)	Zaytoven	3:58
3.	"Lemon Grove" (featuring Malik Burgers)		3:13
4.	"What I'm 'Bout" (featuring J Davi$)		2:57
5.	"Uncle Ben"		2:28
6.	"Highlight" (featuring Cash Passion)		3:28
7.	"The Night Club" (featuring Thommed Cruz)		4:22
8.	"The Whole Thang"		3:20
9.	"Smash" (featuring Gucci Mane)		3:48
10.	"Back on My Shit"	CashMoneyAP	2:55
11.	"Grown Man"		3:54
12.	"Money Now"	CashMoneyAP	3:51
13.	"Holy Grail" (featuring Malik Burgers)	Money Montage; HUMBeats	5:01
14.	"Sender" (featuring Malik Burgers & Thommed Cruz)		3:04
15.	"Lately I've Been Feeling Myself (Outro)"		3:55
Total length:			51:58
