= Young Greatness =

American rapper (1984–2018)

- Young Greatness in 2018

Background information
- Born: Theodore Joseph Jones III; September 19, 1984; New Orleans, Louisiana, U.S.
- Died: October 29, 2018 (aged 34) New Orleans, Louisiana, U.S.
- Genre: Hip hop
- Occupations: Rapper
- Years active: 2012–2018
- Labels: Cash Money; Interscope Records; Quality Control
- Formerly of: Drumma Boy; Jazze Pha; Juvenile

Theodore Joseph Jones III (September 19, 1984 – October 29, 2018), better known by his stage name Young Greatness, was an American rapper. He was best known for his 2015 single "Moolah", which peaked at number 85 on the Billboard Hot 100 chart. He was shot and killed in October 2018.

== Early life ==
Jones was born on September 19, 1984, in New Orleans. He moved to Houston after Hurricane Katrina. He grew up listening to Juvenile, Jay-Z and The Notorious B.I.G.

== Career ==
Taking the stage name Young Greatness, he began attracting notice from Houston rappers such as Bun B and Mike Jones, resulting in a deal with the record label Quality Control Music and Motown in 2015. In November 2015, he released the single "Moolah", which peaked at number 85 on the US Billboard Hot 100. In March 2016, Rolling Stone included Greatness in their list of "10 New Artists You Need to Know". In July 2016, Greatness performed "Moolah" on The Late Show with Stephen Colbert.

== Death ==
On October 29, 2018, Jones was fatally shot in the back while in the parking lot of a Waffle House on Elysian Fields Avenue in New Orleans. He was 34 years old. Two men, Donald Reaux and Donny Maxwell, and a juvenile were indicted for Jones' murder in March 2019. Reaux, who was believed to be the main orchestrator of the attack and the one who killed Jones, was a friend of Jones who prosecution alleged attempted to steal marijuana from him. Reaux also was believed to have armed his two accomplices, who each received less severe armed robbery-related criminal charges. Wix would receive a prison sentence of 20 years after pleading guilty to numerous armed robbery charges, while Maxwell would receive a 19 year prison sentence after pleading guilty to similar charges in December 2019. In January 2023, Reaux would be convicted by a jury of second degree murder and sentenced to life in prison.

== Discography ==
=== Mixtapes ===
List of mixtapes with selected details
Title	Details
Rich & Famous	Released: 2012; Format: Digital download
Trap Jumpin 2.0	Released: 2013; Format: Digital download
Dollar for Hate	Released: 2014; Format: Digital download
I Tried to Tell Em	Released: July 24, 2015; Format: Digital download
Seven (VII)	Released: October 27, 2015; Format: Digital download
I Tried to Tell Em 2	Released: July 8, 2016; Format: Digital download
Bloody Summer	Released: October 30, 2017; Format: Digital download
A Tribute To Greatness	Released: October 29, 2021; Format: Digital download

=== Singles ===
List of singles as lead artist, with selected chart positions
Title	Year	Peak chart positions		Certifications	Album
Title	Year	US	US R&B /HH	Certifications	Album
"Yeah" (featuring Quavo)	2015	—	—		I Tried to Tell Em
"Moolah"	2015	85	30	RIAA: Gold	I Tried to Tell Em
"Ball"	2016	—	—		I Tried to Tell Em 2
"We Rollin'"	2017	—	—		Non-album single
"Drugs & Money"	2017	—	—		Bloody Summer

== See also ==
- List of murdered hip hop musicians
