= Purple Reign =

- Original cover using the font of Purple Rain by Prince. Reissue changes it to avoid copyright infringement.

Mixtape by Future
- Released: January 17, 2016
- Recorded: 2015
- Genre: Trap
- Length: 40:15
- Label: Freebandz
- Producers: DJ Esco (exec.); Metro Boomin (also exec.); DJ Spinz; Dre Moon; DZL; Jon Boii; K-Major; Nard & B; Southside; XL Eagle; Zaytoven; 808 Mafia

Future chronology
| What a Time to Be Alive (2015) | Purple Reign (2016) | Evol (2016) |

Singles from Purple Reign
- 1. "Wicked" Released: April 13, 2016

Purple Reign is the sixteenth mixtape by American rapper Future, hosted and executive-produced by DJ Esco and Metro Boomin. It was released on January 17, 2016, with an 11-hour notice via LiveMixtapes and DatPiff. It is Future's first non-commercial mixtape since the mixtape trilogy Monster (2014), Beast Mode, and 56 Nights (2015). Purple Reign follows the commercial collaborative mixtape What a Time to Be Alive with Canadian rapper Drake. The mixtape features production from frequent collaborators Metro Boomin, Southside, Zaytoven, DJ Spinz, and Nard & B, among others. The title and cover font is a tribute to Prince's landmark 1984 album Purple Rain, which is stylized in the same fashion.

The single "Wicked" would later be included on streaming editions of Future's fourth studio album, Evol, which released a month after Purple Reign. The mixtape was re-released for streaming platforms on April 16, 2020, with different cover art, without the "Intro", "Wicked" and including the song "News or Something".

== Background and composition ==
2015 was a significant year in rapper Future's career. He worked on mixtapes Monster (2014), Beast Mode (2015), 56 Nights (2015), a collaboration mixtape with Drake, What a Time to Be Alive (2015), and his studio album DS2 (2015) shifted from introspective ballads to macabre rap numbers about drugs and sex. Analyzed Matthew Ramirez of Spin, Purple Reign continues this antagonist style, but with more restraint to the point where Future sounds stoic and the instrumentals "muted" and "monochrome". A few moments involve Future delivering the style of sad, straightforward lines prominent on Streetz Calling (2011) and Astronaut Status (2012). As he laments on "Never Forget", "I ain’t make my auntie’s funeral I ain’t never forget it / I know she know I love her and I hope she forgive me."

== Release and promotion ==
The mixtape was released without prior announcement on January 17, 2016, available for download on free mixtape hosting platforms such as DatPiff and LiveMixtapes.

In 2020, Future began re-releasing popular mixtapes that were unavailable on digital streaming platforms, such as Beast Mode and 56 Nights. On April 16, 2020, Purple Reign was released for digital purchase and streaming. The tracklist was altered to remove the single "Wicked" due to its inclusion on the album Evol, combining the "Intro" with "All Right" and extending the track "Salute". The song "News or Something" was included as the final song, originally released in 2015 via Future's SoundCloud as part of the "#MonsterMondays" series.

== Critical reception ==
Professional ratings
Aggregate scores
| Source | Rating |
|---|---|
| Metacritic | 71/100 |
Review scores
| Source | Rating |
| Consequence of Sound | B– |
| HipHopDX | 3.5/5 stars |
| Pitchfork | 7.2/10 |
| PopMatters | 6/10 stars |
| Spectrum Culture | 3.75/5 stars |
| Spin | 7/10 |
| Tiny Mix Tapes | 4.5/5 marks |

At Metacritic, which assigns a normalized rating out of 100 to reviews from mainstream publications, the mixtape received an average score of 71, based on 6 reviews, indicating "generally favorable reviews".

Jayson Greene of Pitchfork wrote that Purple Reign is "a fine tape, but considered in the run of the most vital rapper working, relatively minor."

== Track listing ==
| No. | Title | Writer(s) | Producer(s) | Length |
|---|---|---|---|---|
| 1. | "Intro" | | | 0:55 |
| 2. | "All Right" | Nayvadius Wilburn; Leland Wayne; Andre Proctor; Brian Soko; Rasool Diaz | Metro Boomin; Dre Moon; Soko^{[a]}; Diaz^{[a]} | 2:16 |
| 3. | "Wicked" | Wilburn; Wayne; Joshua Luellen; Özcan Deniz | Metro Boomin; Southside | 2:53 |
| 4. | "Never Forget" | Wilburn | Jon Boii | 3:20 |
| 5. | "Drippin' (How U Luv That)" | Wilburn; Wayne | Metro Boomin | 3:10 |
| 6. | "Inside the Mattress" | Wilburn; Brandon Rackley; James Rosser; Trevon Campbell | Nard & B; XL | 3:30 |
| 7. | "Hater Shit" | Wilburn; Wayne | Metro Boomin | 3:04 |
| 8. | "Salute" | Wilburn; Gary Hill; Kendricke Brown | DJ Spinz; K-Major | 2:47 |
| 9. | "Bye Bye" | Wilburn; Xavier Dotson | Zaytoven | 2:55 |
| 10. | "No Charge" | Wilburn; Luellen | Southside | 2:42 |
| 11. | "Run Up" | Wilburn; Hill | DJ Spinz | 3:17 |
| 12. | "Perkys Calling" | Wilburn; Luellen; Michael Holmes | Southside; DZL^{[a]} | 4:06 |
| 13. | "Purple Reign" | Wilburn; Wayne | Metro Boomin | 4:06 |
| Total length: | | | | 40:15 |

Streaming version
| No. | Title | Length |
|---|---|---|
| 1. | "All Right" | 2:25 |
| 2. | "Never Forget" | 3:19 |
| 3. | "Inside the Mattress" | 3:30 |
| 4. | "Drippin' (How U Luv That)" | 3:10 |
| 5. | "Hater Shit" | 3:04 |
| 6. | "Salute" | 3:45 |
| 7. | "Bye Bye" | 2:55 |
| 8. | "No Charge" | 2:42 |
| 9. | "Run Up" | 3:17 |
| 10. | "Perkys Calling" | 4:06 |
| 11. | "Purple Reign" | 4:01 |
| 12. | "News or Something" | 3:33 |
| Total length: | | 39:52 |

Notes

- ^{^[a]} signifies a co-producer
- ''Wicked'' was included as a closer of the streaming edition of Evol, Future's next studio album. To avoid having the song on multiple projects, it was removed from the tracklist of the reissue.
- Order of ''Drippin' (How U Luv That)'' and ''Inside The Mattres'' was swapped in the reissue's tracklist

Sample credits

- "Wicked" contains a sample of "Kanet Rohi" written by Özcan Deniz, and performed by Rayan.
