= Moolah (song) =

Single by Young Greatness

from the album I Tried to Tell Em and I Tried to Tell Em 2
- Released: November 20, 2015
- Recorded: 2015
- Genre: Hip hop; trap
- Length: 3:24
- Label: Karbon; Quality Control; Capitol
- Songwriter: Theodore Jones
- Producer: Jazze Pha

Young Greatness singles chronology
"Yeah" (2015)	"Moolah" (2015)	"Gettin' to the Paper" (2015)

"Moolah" is a song by American rapper Young Greatness. The song was released on November 20, 2015 by Karbon Music Group, Quality Control Music and Capitol Records. The track was produced by Jazze Pha.

== Critical reception ==
Rolling Stone named "Moolah" one of the 30 best songs of the first half of 2016: "Released to YouTube in 2015 but charting in 2016, rapper Young Greatness croons a striver's anthem that's equal parts Atlanta trap and New Orleans melody."

== Music video ==
The song's accompanying music video premiered on January 8, 2016 on Young Greatness' Vevo channel.

== Live performances ==
Young Greatness performed the song for his network television debut on The Late Show with Stephen Colbert on July 12, 2016.

== Remix ==
The official remix of "Moolah" features American rappers Lil Wayne and Yo Gotti and was released on May 24, 2016.

== Commercial performance ==
"Moolah" debuted at number 95 on Billboard Hot 100 for the chart dated April 16, 2016, and later reached number 85.

=== Charts ===
Chart (2016)	Peak position
US Billboard Hot 100	85
US Hot R&B/Hip-Hop Songs (Billboard)	30

=== Year-end charts ===
Chart (2016)	Position
US Hot R&B/Hip-Hop Songs (Billboard)	97

=== Certifications ===
Region	Certification	Certified units/sales
United States (RIAA)	Gold	500,000^{‡}
^{‡} Sales+streaming figures based on certification alone.
