= Evol (Future album) =

Studio album by Future
- Released: February 6, 2016
- Genres: Hip-hop; trap
- Length: 39:26
- Labels: Freebandz; A1; Epic
- Producers: Ben Billions; DaHeala; DJ Spinz; Metro Boomin; Schife Karbeen; SK; Southside; TM88; The Weeknd

Future chronology
Purple Reign (2016)	Evol (2016)	Free Bricks 2: Zone 6 Edition (2016)

Singles from Evol
- 1. "Low Life" Released: March 1, 2016; 2. "Wicked" Released: April 13, 2016

Evol (stylized in all caps) is the fourth studio album by American rapper Future. It was released on February 6, 2016, through A1 Recordings and Freebandz, and distributed by Epic Records. The album features a sole guest appearance from the Weeknd. It premiered on DJ Khaled's We The Best Radio debut on Beats 1. Evol released five months after the collaborative mixtape What a Time to Be Alive (2015) and a month after Purple Reign (2016). Production was handled by frequent collaborators Metro Boomin, Southside, TM88 and DJ Spinz, among others.

Evol was supported by two singles: "Low Life" and "Wicked". The album received generally positive reviews from critics and debuted at number one on the US Billboard 200. It also debuted at number one on the US Top R&B/Hip-Hop Albums.

== Background and release ==
On December 25, 2015, The Weeknd released a collaborative song with Future, titled "Low Life", on SoundCloud. It was produced by Metro Boomin and Ben Billions and co-produced by The Weeknd. The song was later revealed to be included on Evol. On March 1, 2016, "Low Life" was released as the album's first single. A music video for the track premiered on MTV on the same month.

On February 1, 2016, DJ Khaled announced that he would be premiering Future's fourth album on the debut show of We The Best Radio on Beats 1. Future then announced the album title, release date and artwork, as well as individually tweeting the track list.

In early February, shortly after the album's announcement, Future became involved in a brief public exchange on Twitter with fellow Atlanta rapper Young Thug, which was widely interpreted as a dispute over prominence within the Atlanta trap music scene. On February 3, 2016, Future first posted a tweet reading "Midnight eastern", which was followed minutes later by Young Thug responding, "Boy slow down dropping all that BS music", accompanied by crying, laughing and peace sign emojis, a combination commonly used in online discourse to convey dismissal or mockery. Future then replied shortly afterward with another tweet stating, "Sh!t bout to get real in a few hours".

The album cover artwork was created by the Polish creative production studio Ars Thanea. The album's title is 'love' spelled backwards.

== Critical reception ==
Professional ratings
Aggregate scores
Source	Rating
AnyDecentMusic?	6.8/10
Metacritic	68/100
Review scores
Source	Rating
AllMusic	3.5/5 stars
Billboard	3.5/5 stars
Clash	8/10
Consequence	B+
The Guardian	3/5 stars
HipHopDX	3.0/5
Pitchfork	7.3/10
PopMatters	6/10
Spin	8/10
XXL	4/5

Evol was met with generally positive reviews. At Metacritic, which assigns a normalized rating out of 100 to reviews from mainstream publications, the album received an average score of 68, based on 17 reviews. The aggregator AnyDecentMusic? gave it 6.8 out of 10, based on its assessment of the critical consensus.

In his review, Craig Jenkins of Billboard states, "The spite of 2014 mixtape Monster, the woe of 2015's Beast Mode, and the devilish glee of his No. 1 album DS2 have all chilled into a dull malaise here". He concluded with "Evol doesn't break any rules or set many new ones, but as the latest in a seemingly never-ending series of wonders Future and his team wield in their creation of druggy, downcast afterparty dispatches, it is a joy". Matthew Ramirez of Pitchfork found that while Evol "has slightly more misses than hits, the highs are high—arguably higher than Purple Reign's". Sheldon Pearce of Consequence said, "It's an extraordinary triumph of ambitious trap soundscapes and an excellent complement for a driven artist, a man no longer inhibited by loss. With every passing release, Future grows more confident, and more callous". Dean Van Nguyen of Clash said, "Again Future marshals the glittering soundscapes expertly, his tuneful flow reining in the beats while imbuing all the fragility, heartsickness and aggression that make it the most impressive instrument in rap right now". Israel Daramola of Spin said, "EVOL, along with the Purple Reign mixtape, doesn't provide that instant hit that Future's world-class 2015 was so full of. Instead it crawls into your brain and makes itself at home; you'll find yourself going back to it over and over without even realizing".

Chris Gibbons of XXL said, "EVOL is only the latest building block on one of the most impressive runs from any rapper we've seen, and Future shows no signs of slowing down for anything". Grant Rindner of The Line of Best Fit said, "Odds are Future will drop another project or five between now and the end of the calendar year, so while EVOL is ultimately dispensable it's still a pretty good time". Shirley Ju of HipHopDX said, "As it stands, EVOL is nothing out of the ordinary from his past endeavors. With no measures in place preventing from Future releasing new full-length projects, this album could easily be surpassed in a month or two". Lanre Bakare of The Guardian said, "The formula is working, but for fans using his albums as a way in, they're missing a big part of what makes Future so intriguing". Brian Duricy of PopMatters said, "EVOL doesn't stand up to his critical peaks, but this could easily be seen as but a release to tide fans over before the next blockbuster". Andy Gill of The Independent said, "His raps here still stick fairly closely to the trap-music conventions that have dominated the hip-hop scene in Future's hometown Atlanta for the past decade or so".

== Commercial performance ==
Evol debuted at number one on the US Billboard 200 with 134,000 album-equivalent units; it sold 100,000 copies in its first week, and boasted over 25 million streams. Evol was the third project by Future to debut on the Billboard 200 at number one in seven months. As of March 2016, the album has sold 125,000 copies domestically. As of May 2018, the album was certified platinum by the Recording Industry Association of America (RIAA) for shipments of 1,000,000 units in the United States.

== Track listing ==
Evol track listing
No.	Title	Writer(s)	Producer(s)	Length
1.	"Ain't No Time"	Nayvadius Wilburn; Joshua Luellen	Southside	3:22
2.	"In Her Mouth"	Wilburn; Luellen	Southside	3:12
3.	"Maybach"	Wilburn; Luellen	Southside	3:40
4.	"Xanny Family"	Wilburn; Leland Wayne; Luellen	Metro Boomin; Southside	3:05
5.	"Lil Haiti Baby"	Wilburn; Benjamin Diehl; Ian Lewis; Khaled Khaled	Ben Billions; Schife Karbeen	4:37
6.	"Photo Copied"	Wilburn; Luellen	Southside	2:52
7.	"Seven Rings"	Wilburn; Bryan Simmons; Terrell McNeal; Lionel Nealy	TM88	3:25
8.	"Lie to Me"	Wilburn; Gary Hill; John McGee	DJ Spinz; SK	3:32
9.	"Program"	Wilburn; Luellen	Southside	2:56
10.	"Low Life" (featuring The Weeknd)	Wilburn; Abel Tesfaye; Diehl; Jason Quenneville; Wayne	Metro Boomin; Ben Billions; DaHeala; The Weeknd	5:13
11.	"Fly Shit Only"	Wilburn; Hill; McGee	DJ Spinz; SK	3:32
Total length:				39:26

Streaming Reissue
No.	Title	Writer(s)	Producer(s)	Length
12.	"Wicked"	Wilburn; Wayne; Luellen; Özcan Deniz	Metro Boomin; Southside	2:53
Total length:				42:19

Sample credits

- "Wicked" contains a sample of "Kanet Rohi", written by Özcan Deniz and performed by Rayan.

== Charts ==
=== Weekly charts ===
Chart performance for Evol
Chart (2016)	Peak position
Australian Albums (ARIA)	31
Belgian Albums (Ultratop Flanders)	96
Belgian Albums (Ultratop Wallonia)	146
Canadian Albums (Billboard)	5
Dutch Albums (Album Top 100)	82
French Albums (SNEP)	95
UK Albums (Official Charts)	34
UK R&B Albums (Official Charts)	3
US Billboard 200	1
US Top R&B/Hip-Hop Albums (Billboard)	1

=== Year-end charts ===
2016 year-end chart performance for Evol
Chart (2016)	Position
US Billboard 200	32
US Top R&B/Hip-Hop Albums (Billboard)	16

== Certifications ==
Certifications for Evol
Region	Certification	Certified units/sales
Canada (Music Canada)	Platinum	80,000^{‡}
Denmark (IFPI Danmark)	Gold	10,000^{‡}
United States (RIAA)	2× Platinum	2,000,000^{‡}
^{‡} Sales+streaming figures based on certification alone.

== Release history ==
Release dates and formats for Evol
Region	Date	Label(s)	Format(s)	Ref.
Various	February 6, 2016	A1; Freebandz; Epic	Digital download; streaming	
Various	September 28, 2018	A1; Freebandz; Epic	Vinyl	
