= Chill Bill =

Single by Rob Stone featuring J. Davis and Spooks

from the album Straight Bummin'
- Released: June 17, 2016
- Recorded: 2014
- Length: 3:02
- Label: RCA
- Songwriters: Jaylen Robinson; Javan Davis; Antonio Carrillo; Christopher Rowe
- Producer: PurpDogg

Music video
- "Chill Bill" on YouTube

"Chill Bill" is a song by American hip hop recording artist Rob Stone. The music video was put out on YouTube on June 25, 2015. The song was premiered on March 15, 2015 on YouTube on the account of nuca chitiashvili. The song features vocals from fellow American rappers J. Davis and Spooks, and was released as Stone's commercial debut single on June 17, 2016 by RCA Records. The official remix features verses from American rappers DRAM, Denzel Curry and Cousin Stizz on August 25, 2016.

== Background ==
The whistle heard in "Chill Bill" is from a 1968 British psychological thriller film called Twisted Nerve, which follows a man with multiple personalities on a killing spree to be closer to the woman he loves. The whistling theme was created by composer Bernard Herrmann and was featured in the Tarantino films Kill Bill: Volume 1 and Death Proof, as well as the first season of American Horror Story.

== Music video ==
The song's accompanying music video was posted on June 25, 2015 on Twelve O'Seven's account on YouTube.

== Commercial performance ==
On the chart dated August 20, 2016, "Chill Bill" entered the US Billboard Hot 100 at number 97. The song peaked at number 29.

== Charts and certifications ==
=== Weekly charts ===
Chart (2016–17)	Peak position
Australia (ARIA)	112
Canada Hot 100 (Billboard)	53
US Billboard Hot 100	29
US Hot R&B/Hip-Hop Songs (Billboard)	8

=== Year-end charts ===
Chart (2016)	Position
US Hot R&B/Hip-Hop Songs (Billboard)	51
Chart (2017)	Position
US Hot R&B/Hip-Hop Songs (Billboard)	77

=== Certifications ===
Region	Certification	Certified units/sales
Canada (Music Canada)	Platinum	80,000^{‡}
Denmark (IFPI Danmark)	Gold	45,000^{‡}
France (SNEP)	Gold	100,000^{‡}
Mexico (AMPROFON)	2× Platinum	120,000^{‡}
Poland (ZPAV)	Gold	25,000^{‡}
United Kingdom (BPI)	Silver	200,000^{‡}
United States (RIAA)	4× Platinum	4,000,000^{‡}
^{‡} Sales+streaming figures based on certification alone.
