= Dae Dae =

American rapper (born 1992)

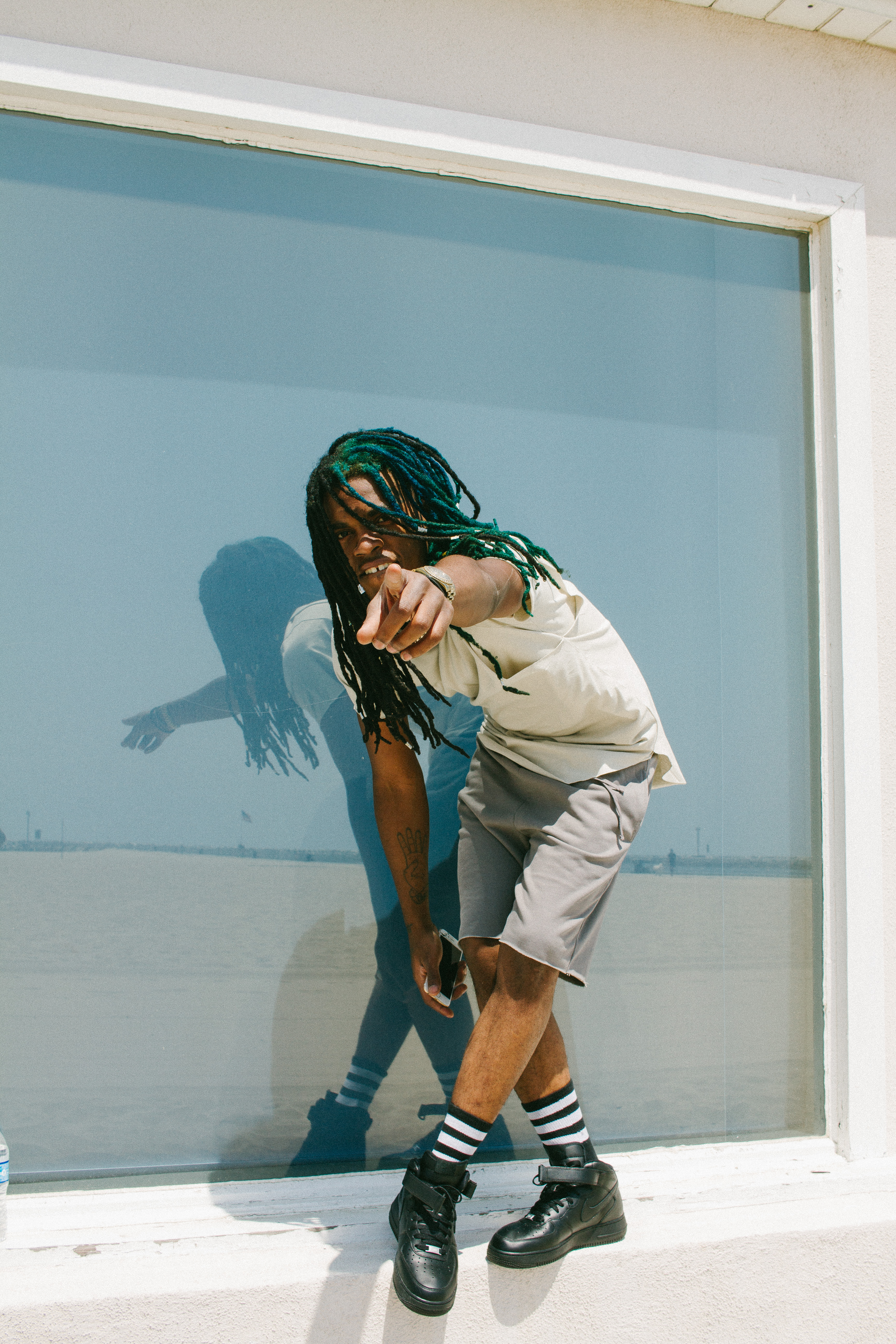
- Dae Dae in 2016

Background information
- Born: Marquavis Goolsby; July 29, 1992 (age 33); Atlanta, Georgia, U.S.
- Genres: Hip hop; trap
- Occupations: Rapper; singer; songwriter
- Years active: 2015–present
- Labels: Blackmon; 22; Warner

Marquavis Goolsby (born July 29, 1992), better known by his stage name Dae Dae, is an American rapper from Atlanta, Georgia. He is best known for his 2016 single "Wat U Mean (Aye, Aye, Aye)", which entered the Billboard Hot 100 and led him to sign with Atlanta native Nitti Beatz in a joint venture with 300 Entertainment.

== Early life ==
Dae Dae grew up in Atlanta's Boulevard Fourth Ward. He found early interest in music at about 8 years old, when his estranged father, John Burton, bought him Bow Wow and Lil Romeo CDs. At age fourteen, Dae Dae dropped out of school and became a father for the first time. Still interested in music and rapping, Dae Dae's father converted a room in their home to a recording studio for him. Shortly after, police arrested his father for having drugs in the home, and confiscated the studio equipment when his father was unable to provide receipts for their purchase. Left with nothing, Dae Dae quickly got a job doing concrete and flooring work, saving all of his earned money to record at a local studio and participate in weekly open mic nights. He eventually met his manager Anthem, who knew Atlanta based producer Nitti, and was offered a record deal from Nitti Beatz Recordings.

== Career ==
=== 2015–present ===
Dae Dae released his debut commercial single "Wat U Mean (Aye, Aye, Aye)" in 2015. He wrote the song while at work, freestyling lines in his head and writing them in his iPhone before calling his producer and recording the song later that day. After signing with 300 Entertainment in 2016, Dae Dae released his debut mixtape, 4 Reasons (2016) which features guest performances from artists including Rich Homie Quan. In February 2016, Dae Dae released the single "Spend It", which was later remixed by Lil Wayne and 2 Chainz. The song was produced by Young Trill Beatz.

Dae Dae joined Young Thug's May 2016 Hi-Tunes tour throughout the United States along with TM88 and Rich The Kid. An official remix of "Wat U Mean" featuring Lil Yachty was released in July of that same year. Dae Dae's third single "Dej Loaf" was released in the following month. In November 2016, he released the collaborative mixtape Tha DefAnition with London on da Track.

In January 2017, he released the single "Dem Days" and was named one of FACT Magazine's 10 Rappers to Watch in 2017.

=== Success of "Wat U Mean" ===
The popularity of Dae Dae's "Wat U Mean" had been steadily increasing since its 2015 release, especially after being remixed by Young Dro. The song was the top song discovered via Shazam in Atlanta in early 2016. In May 2016, a video of a dancer named Matthew King dancing to the song went viral via Twitter, further increasing its exposure and popularity. During the week of June 11, 2016, it was featured on Billboard's Twitter Emerging Artists chart at No. 24. He performed the song live at the 2016 BET Hip Hop Awards.

== Legal issues ==
In June 2021, Dae Dae was arrested for stabbing a 17-year-old Dunkin' Donuts employee in December 2020, because the store was out of what he wanted.

== Discography ==
=== Mixtapes ===
- 4 Reasons (2016)
- The DefAnition (with London on da Track) (2016)
- 5 Reasons (2017)

=== Singles ===
==== As lead artist ====
List of singles, with showing year released, peak chart positions and album name
Title	Year	Peak chart positions			Certifications	Album
Title	Year	US	US R&B/HH	US Rap	Certifications	Album
"Wat U Mean (Aye, Aye, Aye)"	2016	66	20	14	RIAA: Gold	4 Reasons
"Spend It"	2016	— (Note: "Spend It" did not enter the Billboard Hot 100, but peaked at number 13 on the Bubbling Under Hot 100 Singles chart.)	— (Note: "Spend It" did not enter the Hot R&B/Hip-Hop Songs chart, but peaked at number two on the Bubbling Under R&B/Hip-Hop Singles chart.)	—		4 Reasons
"Dej Loaf"	2016	—	—	—		4 Reasons
"Spend It" (Remix) (featuring Young Thug and Young M.A)	2016	—	—	—		Non-album single
