= Bet You Can't Do It Like Me =

"Do It Like Me"

Single by DLOW

from the album I Am DLOW - EP
- Released: October 1, 2015
- Recorded: 2015
- Genre: Hip hop
- Length: 2:26
- Songwriter: Daryon Simmons
- Producer: NunMajorBeats

"Do It Like Me" (formally titled as "Bet You Can't Do It Like Me") is the debut single by American rapper DLOW. The song samples the instrumental of "Knuck If You Buck" by Crime Mob and the hook from "Betcha Can't Do It Like Me" by D4L It reached number 45 on the U.S. Billboard Hot 100.

== Music video ==
DLOW released a dance video for this song on YouTube on September 29, 2015. The official music video was released on May 18, 2016, on DLOW's YouTube account.

== Charts ==
Chart (2015)	Peak position
US Billboard Hot 100	45
US Hot R&B/Hip-Hop Songs (Billboard)	16
