= Hit the Quan =

Single by iLoveMemphis

from the album The TurnUp Kid - EP
- Released: July 14, 2015
- Genre: Hip hop
- Length: 3:01
- Label: Rush Hour; Palm Tree
- Songwriter: Richard Colbert
- Producer: Buck Nasty

iLoveMemphis singles chronology
"Hit the Quan" (2015)	"Lean and Dabb" (2015)

Music video
- "Hit the Quan" on YouTube

"Hit the Quan" is the debut single by American rapper iLoveMemphis. This song is based around a dance that was first made popular by late American rapper Rich Homie Quan. It peaked at number 15 on the Billboard Hot 100.

== Background and release ==
Hit the Quan was a dance that was originally performed by Rich Homie Quan in his video for the song "Flex (Ooh, Ooh, Ooh)" which was released in April 2015. The dance Rich Homie Quan did in the video soon became a hit with numerous Vines being produced portraying the dance. At that time, most people referred to the dance routine as simply the "Rich Homie Quan" dance. In July 2015, 3 months following the release of the song, iLoveMemphis released a song titled "Hit the Quan" which then became popular. He said that he spent $35 making the song.

== Music video ==
The song's accompanying music video premiered on November 12, 2015, on his Vevo account on YouTube and, as of May 2026, has amassed over 92 million views.

== Commercial performance ==
"Hit the Quan" debuted at number 41 on the Billboard Hot 100 for the chart dated September 5, 2015. It peaked at number 15 on the chart, becoming iHeartMemphis' only top 40 entry on the chart. As of November 2015, the song has sold 498,000 copies domestically. It was certified Platinum by the RIAA on December 18, 2015.

== Live performances ==
On November 2, 2015, iLoveMemphis made his television debut on The Ellen DeGeneres Show performing "Hit the Quan".

== Charts ==
=== Weekly charts ===
Chart (2015)	Peak position
Canada Hot 100 (Billboard)	65
US Billboard Hot 100	15
US Hot R&B/Hip-Hop Songs (Billboard)	7

=== Year-end charts ===
Chart (2015)	Position
US Billboard Hot 100	83
Chart (2016)	Position
US Hot R&B/Hip-Hop Songs (Billboard)	67

== Certifications ==
Region	Certification	Certified units/sales
United States (RIAA)	Platinum	1,000,000^{‡}
^{‡} Sales+streaming figures based on certification alone.
