= Wat U Mean (Aye, Aye, Aye) =

2015 song by Dae Dae

Single by Dae Dae
- Released: February 19, 2016
- Recorded: 2015
- Genre: Hip hop
- Length: 3:01
- Label: Nitti Beatz; 300
- Songwriters: Marquavis Goolsby; Michael Givens
- Producer: Mercy

Dae Dae singles chronology
| "Wat U Mean (Aye, Aye, Aye)" (2016) | "Spend It" (2016) |

Music video
- "Wat U Mean (Family To Feed)" on YouTube

Remix cover

"Wat U Mean (Aye, Aye, Aye)" (also titled "Wat U Mean (Family To Feed)") is a song by American rapper Dae Dae, released in late 2015. It went viral and became his breakout hit in 2016.

== Background ==
When Dae Dae was working in concrete and flooring jobs, he would listen to music in his earphones, including instrumentals. One particular day, he was freestyling in his head and thought of two lines as he was grinding. He turned the grinder off and wrote them down on his iPhone. When he resumed grinding, he came up with two more lines and wrote them in his phone again. He then called his producer, Mercy, to tell him he wanted to record the song, and they met in the studio that night. Mercy made the beat in front of him and the song was created by the end of the night.

== Composition ==
The song contains synths and strings in the productions and street themes. Dae Dae raps with Auto-Tune about his need to financially support his family.

== Release and promotion ==
"Wat U Mean" was created in 2015, but began to receive significant exposure after the music video was released in April 2016 through WorldStarHipHop, leading to moderate success. The song propelled to further popularity and attention when a video of a dancer named Matthew King dancing to the song went viral on Twitter in May 2016.

== Critical reception ==
XXL and Passion of the Weiss included the song in their lists of the best hip-hop songs of 2016.

== Remixes ==
American rapper Young Dro released a remix of the song in April 2016. The official remix was released on July 20, 2016 and features American rapper Lil Yachty.

== Live performances ==
Dae Dae performed the song at the 2016 BET Hip Hop Awards.

== Charts ==
| Chart (2016) | Peak position |
|---|---|
| US Billboard Hot 100 | 66 |
| US Hot R&B/Hip-Hop Songs (Billboard) | 20 |

== Certifications ==
| Region | Certification | Certified units/sales |
|---|---|---|
| United States (RIAA) | Gold | 500,000^{‡} |
^{‡} Sales+streaming figures based on certification alone.
