= Wicked (Future song) =

2016 single by Future

Single by Future featuring DJ Esco

from the album Purple Reign and EVOL
- Released: April 13, 2016
- Genre: Hip hop; trap
- Length: 2:53
- Label: A1; Freebandz; Epic
- Songwriters: Nayvadius Wilburn; Leland Wayne; Joshua Luellen; Özcan Deniz
- Producers: Metro Boomin; Southside

Future singles chronology
"Low Life" (2016)	"Wicked" (2016)	"I Got the Keys" (2016)

Music video
- "Wicked" on YouTube

"Wicked" is a song by the American rapper Future. It first appeared on January 17, 2016, as a track from his sixteenth mixtape Purple Reign, before being released as the lead single on April 13. The song was also included on the streaming version of EVOL. The song samples "Kanet Rohi" written by Özcan Deniz, and performed by Rayan.

== Release ==
On January 17, 2016, Future premiered his thirteenth mixtape Purple Reign, which included "Wicked" as the third track. On April 13, 2016, "Wicked" was released for digital download as a single on the iTunes Store, becoming the mixtape's first single. The song was included on the streaming version of Future's fourth studio album, EVOL, which was released on in February 2016.

== Music video ==
The music video for "Wicked", directed by Grant Singer, premiered via Apple Music on June 3, 2016. It was uploaded to Future's Vevo channel on September 1, 2016.

== Live performances ==
Future appeared on The Tonight Show Starring Jimmy Fallon on April 14, 2016, performing "Wicked". On June 26, 2016, he performed the song at the BET Awards. The song was also included on the set list for Future and Drake's 2016 Summer Sixteen Tour.

== Remixes and usage in the media ==
In April 2016, rappers Fabolous and Jadakiss released their collaborative remix of "Wicked". On June 12, 2016, the song was playing during the Orlando nightclub shooting.

== Track listing ==
Digital download
No.	Title	Length
1.	"Wicked"	2:53

== Commercial performance ==
On the chart dating May 7, 2016, "Wicked" debuted at number 73 on the Billboard Hot 100, and peaked at number 41 on the chart two months later. It was ranked at number 97 on the Hot 100 year-end chart for 2016.

== Charts ==
=== Weekly charts ===
Chart (2016)	Peak position
Australia (ARIA)	93
UK Singles (Official Charts)	107
US Billboard Hot 100	41
US Hot R&B/Hip-Hop Songs (Billboard)	13

=== Year-end charts ===
Chart (2016)	Position
US Billboard Hot 100	97
US Hot R&B/Hip-Hop Songs (Billboard)	35

== Certifications ==
Region	Certification	Certified units/sales
Canada (Music Canada)	Platinum	80,000^{‡}
United States (RIAA)	Platinum	1,000,000^{‡}
^{‡} Sales+streaming figures based on certification alone.

== Release history ==
Region	Date	Format	Label	Ref.
Various	January 17, 2016	Digital download	A1; Epic; Freebandz	
United States	April 18, 2016	Rhythmic contemporary	A1; Epic; Freebandz	
