= DLow =

American rapper (born 1995)

iAmDLOW
- Also known as: Bop King, DLOW
- Born: Daryon Martice Simmons; August 15, 1995 (age 30); Chicago, Illinois, U.S.
- Genres: Hip hop
- Occupations: Dancer; rapper; choreographer
- Years active: 2014–present
- Label: Atlantic
- Website: iAmDLOWOfficial.com

Daryon Martice Simmons (born August 15, 1995), better known by his stage name, iAmDLOW, (Note: Capitalization varies.) is an American hip-hop dancer, rapper, and choreographer from Chicago, Illinois. "DLOW" is an acronym that stands for "Determined, Loyal, Optimistic, and Willing to Learn". He became known through his bopping, a type of dance. He has been a regular collaborator of fellow hip-hop dancer and rapper, Lil Kemo (also known as "King Kemo"), since 2013 when they made their first video together. His single, "Bet You Can't Do It Like Me" charted on the Billboard Hot 100 in 2015.

== Career ==
iAmDLOW noticed a dance called "bop" that was becoming popular in Chicago. He then started doing it with his own style. He met Travon Biggs, better known as Lil Kemo, around 2013 and they started dancing together. The first video they made together is called "DLOW and Kemo (Episode 1)", published in May 2013. They gained local popularity and received offers to dance at school functions, parties, and in music videos. DLOW was previously signed by Atlantic Records. DLOW is managed by Manticore Music.

"I'm not happy that it's ["The Dlow Shuffle"] blown up, I'm happy that it's given people something to do. Instead of ...a set of kids [getting] together in a group talking about what they're going to do to this guy or how they're going to do this to this guy, they get together in a group and say, 'let's do The Dlow Shuffle, let's bop.' I'm glad I can turn my city around in a positive way, and that's my whole mindset."

— DLOW, 2014 interview with iGrind

He released the music video for his single, "The Dlow Shuffle", in December 2013, which is also a dance that features bopping. He and Lil Kemo got to perform it with Steve Harvey on his talk show and with the anchors of Fox 32's "Good Day Chicago" in January 2014. "The DLow Shuffle part 2" was released in September 2014. He released the music video for his single, "Bet You Can't Do It Like Me" in September 2015. Its accompanying challenge received many renditions online and it charted on the Billboard Hot 100 in November.

DLow's music video "Pregame" was directed and edited by Hex Hectic in 2015. Hex Hectic also served as the lead content producer and videographer during DLow's Let's Dance Tour.

== Dancing influences ==
iAmDLOW has listed the dance moves of Michael Jackson, Chris Brown, Omarion, and Usher as inspirations. Popular dances like the “Cha Cha Slide”, and the “Cupid Shuffle” influenced him to make his own.

== Personal life ==
iAmDLOW has five siblings. He never met his father, and his mother struggled with a drug addiction.

== Discography ==
=== Singles ===
Year	Title	Peak chart positions		Album
Year	Title	U.S.	US R&B	Album
2013	"DLOW Shuffle"			
2015	"Bet You Can't Do It Like Me"	45	16	I Am DLOW - EP
2016	"All Day (feat Oh Boy Prince)"			
2017	"Do Your Dance (prod. by DBrooks)"			

=== Mixtapes ===
Year	Title	Peak chart positions		Album Details
Year	Title	U.S.	US R&B	Album Details
2015	Unexpected Statement			· Released: January 7, 2015 · Format: Digital download
2016	I Am DLOW			· Released: March 18, 2016 · Label: Atlantic Records · Format: Digital download
2016	Paige III			· Released:November 25, 2016 · Label: Atlantic Records · Format: Digital download
