= Rob Stone (rapper) =

American rapper (born 1995)

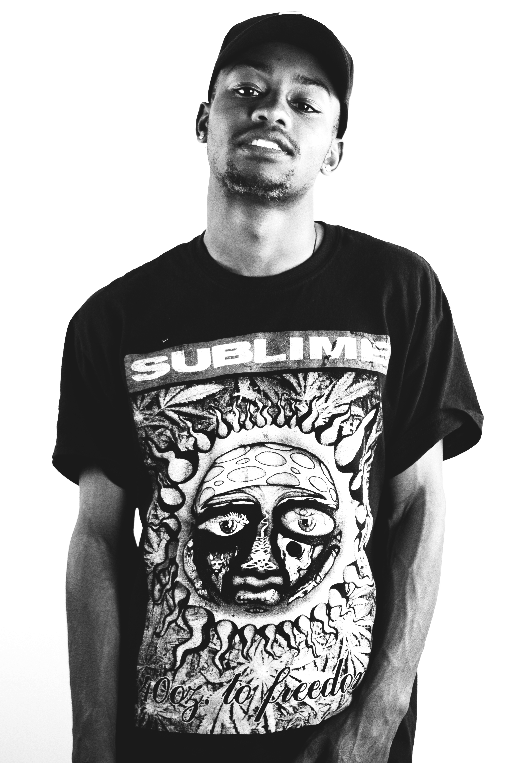
- Stone in 2016

Background information
- Also known as: Rob $tone
- Born: Jaylen Anthony Robinson; January 25, 1995 (age 31); San Diego, California, U.S.
- Genre: Hip hop
- Occupations: Rapper; songwriter
- Years active: 2014–present
- Labels: RCA; Grovetown; Create
- Website: youngrobstone.com

Jaylen Anthony Robinson (born January 25, 1995), known professionally as Rob Stone (stylized as Rob $tone), is an American rapper from San Diego, California.

== Early life ==
Jaylen Anthony Robinson was born on January 25, 1995, in San Diego, California. From a young age, he was influenced by his father’s vintage music collection, and expanded his listening to reggae, hip hop, rock, and R&B. He attended college in Atlanta, Georgia, where he first started teaching himself how to rap.

== Career ==
Stone first released his first song "Chill Bill" on June 10, 2014, on his SoundCloud. He wrote it after being arrested and released by the police. Stone then went on to release his debut mixtape Straight Bummin' on February 8, 2015. The music video for "Chill Bill" was released on June 25, 2015, on his friend's YouTube channel called "Twelve O'Seven". Stone then released the song as his debut single on June 17, 2016. The song debuted at number 99 on the Billboard Hot 100, and peaked at number 29 on the chart. The official remix of the song features American rappers DRAM, Denzel Curry, and Cousin Stizz. In September 2016, Stone released his second mixtape I'm Almost Ready.

== Discography ==
=== Studio albums ===
- Don't Wait for It (2017)
- Stone Cold (2020)
- BONA FIDE (2024)

=== Mixtapes ===
List of mixtapes, with selected details
Title	Album details
Straight Bummin'	Released: February 8, 2015; Label: Self-released; Format: Digital download
I'm Almost Ready	Released: September 6, 2016; Label: RCA; Format: Digital download
Young Rob $Tone	Released: May 4, 2018; Label: RCA; Format: Digital download
Solitaire Stone	Released: February 12, 2021; Label: Grove Town Records; Format: Digital download

=== Singles ===
==== As lead artist ====
List of singles, with selected chart positions and certifications, showing year released and album name
Title	Year	Peak chart positions				Certifications	Album
Title	Year	US	US R&B	US Rap	CAN	Certifications	Album
"Chill Bill" (featuring J. Davis and Spooks or remix featuring DRAM, Denzel Curry and Cousin Stizz)	2016	29	8	7	53	BPI: Silver; RIAA: 4× Platinum	Straight Bummin'
"Bussin'"	2017	—	—	—	—		Young Rob $Tone
"Too Faded" (with P-Lo or remix with Snoop Dogg)	2018	—	—	—	—		Stone Cold
