= Summer Sixteen =

Single by Drake
- Released: January 30, 2016
- Recorded: 2016
- Genre: Hip hop
- Length: 3:22
- Label: OVO; Cash Money; Young Money; Republic
- Songwriters: Aubrey Graham; Noah Shebib; Matthew Samuels; Kevin Gomringer; Tim Gomringer; Brian Bennett
- Producers: 40; Boi-1da; Cubeatz

Drake singles chronology
"Work" (2016)	"Summer Sixteen" (2016)	"Come and See Me" (2016)

"Summer Sixteen" is a single by Canadian rapper Drake, released to promote his fourth studio album Views, although it was not included on that album. The song premiered on OVO Sound Radio and was released for digital download on January 30, 2016. It was produced by 40, Boi-1da and Cubeatz. It features uncredited vocals by DJ Khaled.

== Background ==
The song contains a slowed-down sample of the 1975 song "Glass Tubes" performed by Brian Bennett from the KPM Music library. The artwork for the single was designed by Filip Pągowski, the creator of the Comme des Garçons logo. The song has been interpreted as a diss track against American rapper Meek Mill.

== Commercial performance ==
"Summer Sixteen" debuted at number six on the US Billboard Hot 100 the week of February 20, 2016, selling 215,000 downloads in its first week; these sales became the highest debut sales of Drake's career at the time. As of March 26, 2016, the single sold 358,032 copies in the United States.

== Personnel ==
Adapted from Jaxsta.

- 40 – production, songwriting mixing, recording
- Boi-1da – production (uncredited), songwriting
- Cubeatz – production (uncredited), songwriting
- Drake – songwriting, vocals
- DJ Khaled – vocals (uncredited)
- Noel Campell – mixing

== Charts ==
Chart (2016)	Peak position
Australia (ARIA)	25
Austria (Ö3 Austria Top 40)	68
Belgium Urban (Ultratop Flanders)	23
Canada Hot 100 (Billboard)	12
Euro Digital Song Sales (Billboard)	17
France (SNEP)	24
Germany (GfK)	97
Ireland (IRMA)	71
Netherlands (Single Top 100)	84
New Zealand Heatseekers (Recorded Music NZ)	6
Sweden (Sverigetopplistan)	98
Switzerland (Schweizer Hitparade)	63
UK Singles (Official Charts)	23
US Billboard Hot 100	6
US Hot R&B/Hip-Hop Songs (Billboard)	1
US Rhythmic Airplay (Billboard)	19

=== Year-end charts ===
Chart (2016)	Position
US Hot R&B/Hip-Hop Songs (Billboard)	40
US Hot Rap Songs (Billboard)	23

== Certifications and sales ==
Region	Certification	Certified units/sales
Australia (ARIA)	Gold	35,000^{‡}
Canada (Music Canada)	Gold	40,000^{*}
United Kingdom (BPI)	Silver	200,000^{‡}
United States (RIAA)	Platinum	1,000,000^{‡}
^{*} Sales figures based on certification alone.^{‡} Sales+streaming figures based on certification alone.
