= Low Life (song) =

Single by Future featuring the Weeknd

from the album Evol
- Released: March 1, 2016
- Recorded: 2015
- Genre: Trap; hip-hop
- Length: 5:13
- Label: A1; Freebandz; Epic
- Songwriters: Nayvadius Wilburn; Abel Tesfaye; Leland Wayne; Benjamin Diehl; Jason Quenneville
- Producers: Metro Boomin; Ben Billions; DaHeala; The Weeknd (co.)

Future singles chronology
| "Stick Talk" (2016) | "Low Life" (2016) | "Wicked" (2016) |

The Weeknd singles chronology
| "Nocturnal" / "Wonderful" (2016) | "Low Life" (2016) | "Wild Love" (2016) |

Music video
- "Low Life" on YouTube

"Low Life" is a song by American rapper Future featuring Canadian singer the Weeknd. It was originally released on February 6, 2016, as a track from the former's fourth studio album Evol, before being sent to radio on March 1, 2016, as the lead single. Prior to that, it was released to the Weeknd's SoundCloud on December 25, 2015. The song was written by Future, the Weeknd, Metro Boomin, Ben Billions, and DaHeala, and produced by the latter four.

The song was featured in Grand Theft Auto Online on Radio Los Santos' new mix, which was released in The Contract Update.

== Release ==
On December 24, 2015, Future and the Weeknd tweeted that they would release a new song. On the same day, Future posted a short snippet of the song on his Instagram. On December 25, "Low Life" was uploaded on the Weeknd's SoundCloud account. On February 4, 2016, Future announced that would soon release his fourth studio album, EVOL. He published the album's 11-song track list, which included "Low Life". Future released EVOL on February 6.

== Critical reception ==
Upon its release, "Low Life" received positive reviews from music critics, who frequently highlighted it as a standout track on EVOL for its successful blend of trap and R&B elements. Reviewers praised the song's atmospheric production and the complementary vocal styles of Future and The Weeknd, noting its replay value as a moody, hedonistic collaboration that captured the artists' shared affinity for excess.

Pitchfork's Jayson Greene commended the track in a January 2016 review, describing the performers' "natural and expressive" delivery and their chemistry in embracing unapologetic indulgence without judgment. In the outlet's album critique the following month, Greene further positioned "Low Life" as a high point, evoking the sultry, mysterious vibe of The Weeknd's early mixtape era while integrating Future's raw energy effectively.

PopMatters echoed this enthusiasm in an April 2016 singles review, lauding the duo's "standout" vocals atop "nocturnal, ether-addled synth textures" that created a hazy, immersive soundscape. The site's album review similarly called it a "surefire radio staple," attributing its appeal to the star power and pop sensibilities of the collaboration.

The Singles Jukebox panel offered a more mixed assessment in March 2016, assigning an average score of 3.67 out of 10 across contributor blurbs that acknowledged the song's atmospheric alignment with Future and The Weeknd's slurred, drugged-out aesthetics but critiqued its sleepy repetition and lack of energy.[54]

== Commercial performance ==
"Low Life" debuted at number 52 on the Billboard Hot 100 for the week of February 27, 2016. Its chart debut was supported by first-week sales of 60,588 copies. As of April 23, 2016, the single had sold 247,300 copies in the US. The single would reach its peak of number 18 on the Hot 100 on May 7, 2016, is certified eight-times Platinum by the Recording Industry Association of America (RIAA).

== Music video ==
The song's accompanying music video premiered on March 25, 2016, on Future's Vevo account on YouTube. French Montana and Belly make cameo appearances in the video.

== Charts ==
=== Weekly charts ===
| Chart (2016) | Peak position |
|---|---|
| Australia (ARIA) | 96 |
| Canada Hot 100 (Billboard) | 25 |
| France (SNEP) | 77 |
| Netherlands (Single Top 100) | 91 |
| Portugal (AFP) | 85 |
| Sweden Heatseeker (Sverigetopplistan) | 1 |
| Switzerland (Schweizer Hitparade) | 72 |
| US Billboard Hot 100 | 18 |
| US Hot R&B/Hip-Hop Songs (Billboard) | 6 |
| US R&B/Hip-Hop Airplay (Billboard) | 12 |
| US Rhythmic Airplay (Billboard) | 10 |

| Chart (2025) | Peak position |
|---|---|
| Greece International (IFPI) | 41 |

=== Year-end charts ===
| Chart (2016) | Position |
|---|---|
| Australia Urban (ARIA) | 42 |
| Canada (Canadian Hot 100) | 72 |
| US Billboard Hot 100 | 30 |
| US Hot R&B/Hip-Hop Songs (Billboard) | 15 |

== Certifications ==
| Region | Certification | Certified units/sales |
|---|---|---|
| Australia (ARIA) | Platinum | 70,000^{‡} |
| Canada (Music Canada) | 6× Platinum | 480,000^{‡} |
| Denmark (IFPI Danmark) | Platinum | 90,000^{‡} |
| France (SNEP) | Platinum | 200,000^{‡} |
| Germany (BVMI) | Gold | 200,000^{‡} |
| Italy (FIMI) | Gold | 50,000^{‡} |
| New Zealand (RMNZ) | 2× Platinum | 60,000^{‡} |
| Poland (ZPAV) | Platinum | 50,000^{‡} |
| Sweden (GLF) | Platinum | 40,000^{‡} |
| United Kingdom (BPI) | Platinum | 600,000^{‡} |
| United States (RIAA) | 13× Platinum | 13,000,000^{‡} |
Streaming
| Greece (IFPI Greece) | 2× Platinum | 4,000,000^{†} |
^{‡} Sales+streaming figures based on certification alone.^{†} Streaming-only figures based on certification alone.

== Release history ==
| Region | Date | Format | Label | Ref. |
|---|---|---|---|---|
| United States | March 1, 2016 | Rhythmic contemporary and urban contemporary radio | A1; Epic; Freebandz | |
