= ILoveMemphis =

American rapper

iLoveMemphis
- Also known as: iHeartMemphis
- Born: Richard Maurice Colbert; March 29, 1993 (age 33); Memphis, Tennessee, U.S.
- Genres: Hip hop; pop
- Occupation: Rapper
- Years active: 2014–present
- Labels: Rush Hour; Palm Tree; Sony

Richard Maurice Colbert (born March 29, 1993), better known by his stage name iLoveMemphis, or iHeartMemphis, is an American rapper from Memphis, Tennessee. He is best known for his debut single "Hit the Quan" which peaked at number 15 on the Billboard Hot 100.

== Career ==
=== 2015: Breakthrough ===
iLoveMemphis' debut single "Hit the Quan" was produced by Buck Nasty and released on July 4, 2015. Hit the Quan is a dance that was originally performed by Rich Homie Quan in his video for the song "Flex (Ooh, Ooh, Ooh)" which was released in April 2015. The dance Rich Homie Quan did in the video soon became a hit, with numerous Vines being produced portraying the dance. At that time, most people referred to the dance routine as simply the "Rich Homie Quan" dance. In July 2015, three months following the release of the song, iLoveMemphis released a song titled "Hit The Quan" which then became popular. He said that he spent $35 on making the song. The video for "Hit the Quan" debuted worldwide on November 12, 2015. On December 18, 2015, iLoveMemphis' second single "Lean and Dabb" was released on iTunes.

=== 2016–present: Further ventures ===
iLoveMemphis is currently working with a rising artist named Dkotic whose real name is Arthur Moore. He was found by iLoveMemphis in the summer of 2017, and released a song with iLoveMemphis called "Lil Dance" which kicked off the summer of 2017 on Instagram and Musical.ly. The song eventually accumulated over 1 million streams.

=== Television appearances ===
In November 2015, iLoveMemphis made two major television appearances. The first was on The Ellen DeGeneres Show, and the second appearance was on the talk show The Real. In 2017, iLoveMemphis was featured on rapper Teflon Don‘s single "Stop & Go".

== Legal issues ==
In July 2015, Colbert was criminally charged for allegedly participating in what Memphis Police call a "gang rape" of a woman who was under the influence at the time. Colbert, along with two other individuals, face charges that include aggravated rape. Colbert denies the allegations against him. He pled not guilty, and the charges against him were eventually dropped based on DNA evidence.

In February 2026, Colbert was taken into custody after he barricaded himself inside of his home in Plantation, Florida for 11 hours. According to Plantation Police, Colbert was wanted for making "written or electronic threats" to kill. He was transported to an area hospital to be checked out after he was taken into custody.

== Discography ==
=== Mixtapes ===
- Thank You Instagram (2015)
- Please Excuse My Turn Up (2016)

=== EPs ===
- The TurnUp Kid - EP (2016)

=== Singles ===
List of singles as lead artist, with selected chart positions
Title	Year	Peak chart positions			Certifications	Album
Title	Year	US	US R&B /HH	CAN	Certifications	Album
"Hit the Quan"	2015	15	7	65	RIAA: Platinum	The TurnUp Kid - EP
"Lean and Dabb"	2015	98	29	—		The TurnUp Kid - EP
"Bang Challenge"	2016	—	—	—		Non-album singles
"Left Foot, Right Foot"	2016	—	—	—		Non-album singles
