= Sucker for Pain =

2016 single for the Suicide Squad soundtrack

Single by Lil Wayne, Wiz Khalifa, and Imagine Dragons with Logic and Ty Dolla Sign featuring X Ambassadors

from the album Suicide Squad: The Album
- Released: June 24, 2016
- Recorded: 2016
- Genre: Alternative hip-hop; rap rock
- Length: 4:03
- Label: Atlantic; Warner Bros.
- Songwriters: Dwayne Carter Jr.; Cameron Thomaz; Dan Reynolds; Daniel Platzman; Wayne Sermon; Benjamin McKee; Sir Robert Bryson Hall II; Tyrone Griffin Jr.; Sam Harris; Alexander Grant
- Producer: Alex da Kid

Lil Wayne singles chronology
"No Problem" (2016)	"Sucker for Pain" (2016)	"Running Back" (2017)

Wiz Khalifa singles chronology
"Kush Ups" (2016)	"Sucker for Pain" (2016)	"Fuck Apologies" (2016)

Imagine Dragons singles chronology
"Not Today" (2016)	"Sucker for Pain" (2016)	"Levitate" (2016)

Logic singles chronology
"Wrist" (2016)	"Sucker for Pain" (2016)	"Sriracha" (2016)

Ty Dolla $ign singles chronology
"Work from Home" (2016)	"Sucker for Pain" (2016)	"Campaign" (2016)

X Ambassadors singles chronology
"Low Life" (2016)	"Sucker for Pain" (2016)	"Collider" (2016)

Suicide Squad singles chronology
"Heathens" (2016)	"Sucker for Pain" (2016)	"Purple Lamborghini" (2016)

Music video
- "Sucker for Pain" on YouTube

"Sucker for Pain" is a song by American rappers Lil Wayne and Wiz Khalifa and American pop rock band Imagine Dragons with American rapper Logic and American singer Ty Dolla $ign featuring American pop rock band X Ambassadors. The song was released as a single for the motion picture soundtrack for Suicide Squad (2016) on June 24, 2016, by Atlantic Records. On the same day, the official music video was uploaded to Atlantic Records' YouTube channel. In 2022, a demo of the song performed by Britney Spears leaked online.

== Critical reception ==
Elias Leight of Rolling Stone called the song "loopy" and praised Lil Wayne's contribution to the song, saying "Wayne shines during his verse, delivering self-destructive rhymes while skipping nimbly around the plodding beat". Carly Mallenbaum of USA Today felt that the song is "sexy".

== Commercial performance ==
In the United States, the song reached number 15 on the Billboard Hot 100 chart and number 3 on the Hot R&B/Hip-Hop Songs.

It also reached the top 20 overseas, peaking at number 11 on the UK singles chart, making it Lil Wayne's highest charting hit as a lead artist, although his highest charting UK top hit overall would later be a guest appearance on DJ Khaled's "I'm the One".

Even in Europe, the song hit the Western national musical markets, reaching the top five in Nordic and Eastern countries, including Finland, Norway and Poland, top ten in Austria, Russia, Germany, Slovakia, Czech Republic, Denmark and Sweden, top twenty in France, Switzerland, Italy and Ireland and top forty in the Netherlands, Belgium and Hungary.

== Track listings ==
Digital download
No.	Title	Length
1.	"Sucker for Pain" (with Logic and Ty Dolla $ign featuring X Ambassadors)	4:03

== Charts ==
=== Weekly charts ===
Chart (2016–2017)	Peak position
Australia (ARIA)	7
Austria (Ö3 Austria Top 40)	6
Belgium (Ultratop 50 Flanders)	35
Belgium (Ultratop 50 Wallonia)	35
Canada Hot 100 (Billboard)	19
Czech Republic Airplay (ČNS IFPI)	4
Czech Republic Singles Digital (ČNS IFPI)	6
Denmark (Tracklisten)	9
Finland (Suomen virallinen lista)	5
France (SNEP)	18
Germany (GfK)	8
Hungary (Single Top 40)	26
Ireland (IRMA)	18
Italy (FIMI)	19
Latvia (Latvijas Top 40)	6
Lebanon (Lebanese Top 20)	4
Netherlands (Dutch Top 40)	29
Netherlands (Single Top 100)	30
New Zealand (Recorded Music NZ)	5
Norway (VG-lista)	3
Poland Airplay (ZPAV)	5
Portugal (AFP)	5
Russia (Tophit)	6
Scottish Singles Sales (Official Charts)	13
Sweden (Sverigetopplistan)	9
Slovakia Airplay (ČNS IFPI)	38
Slovakia Singles Digital (ČNS IFPI)	7
Switzerland (Schweizer Hitparade)	16
UK Singles (Official Charts)	11
UK Hip Hop/R&B (Official Charts)	1
US Billboard Hot 100	15
US Pop Airplay (Billboard)	21
US Hot R&B/Hip-Hop Songs (Billboard)	3
US Hot Rock & Alternative Songs (Billboard)	3
US Rhythmic Airplay (Billboard)	8

=== Year-end charts ===
Chart (2016)	Position
Australia (ARIA)	54
Australia Urban (ARIA)	6
Austria (Ö3 Austria Top 40)	37
Canada (Canadian Hot 100)	64
Denmark (Tracklisten)	83
Germany (Official German Charts)	46
Italy (FIMI)	87
Sweden (Sverigetopplistan)	94
Switzerland (Schweizer Hitparade)	78
UK Singles (Official Charts Company)	71
US Billboard Hot 100	68
US Hot R&B/Hip-Hop Songs (Billboard)	25
US Hot Rock Songs (Billboard)	8
Chart (2017)	Position
Australia Urban (ARIA)	41
US Hot Rock Songs (Billboard)	8

=== Decade-end charts ===
Chart (2010–2019)	Position
US Hot Rock Songs (Billboard)	42

== Certifications ==
Region	Certification	Certified units/sales
Australia (ARIA)	Platinum	70,000^{‡}
Belgium (BRMA)	Gold	10,000^{‡}
Denmark (IFPI Danmark)	Platinum	90,000^{‡}
France (SNEP)	Platinum	133,333^{‡}
Germany (BVMI)	Platinum	400,000^{‡}
Italy (FIMI)	2× Platinum	100,000^{‡}
New Zealand (RMNZ)	4× Platinum	120,000^{‡}
Poland (ZPAV)	2× Platinum	100,000^{‡}
Portugal (AFP)	Platinum	10,000^{‡}
Spain (Promusicae)	Platinum	60,000^{‡}
Switzerland (IFPI Switzerland)	Gold	15,000^{‡}
United Kingdom (BPI)	2× Platinum	1,200,000^{‡}
United States (RIAA)	3× Platinum	3,000,000^{‡}
^{‡} Sales+streaming figures based on certification alone.

== Release history ==
Region	Date	Format	Label	Ref.
Worldwide	June 24, 2016	Digital download; streaming	Atlantic	
