= YG discography =

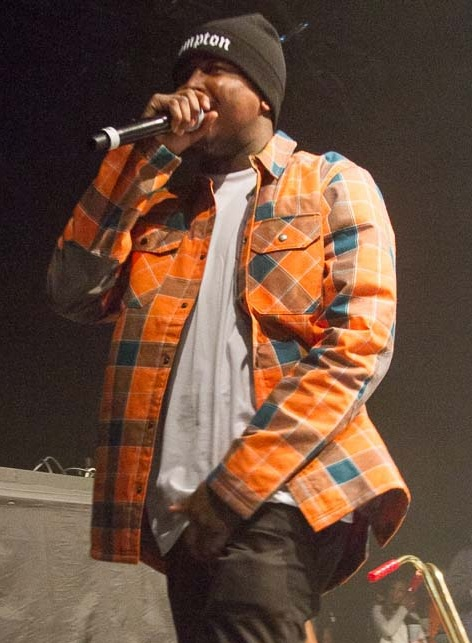
- YG performing in 2015
- Studio albums: 7
- Soundtrack albums: 1
- Singles: 55
- Music videos: 36
- Collaboration albums: 2
- Mixtapes: 10

The discography of YG, an American rapper, consists of seven studio albums, one soundtrack, 55 singles (including 25 as a featured artist), 36 music videos, two collaborative studio albums, and ten mixtapes. His debut studio album, My Krazy Life (2014), includes his two singles with "My Nigga" and "Who Do You Love", while his second studio album, Still Brazy (2016), has singles such as "Big Bank", amongst others.

== Albums ==
=== Studio albums ===
List of studio albums, with selected chart positions and certifications
Title	Album details	Peak chart positions							Certifications
Title	Album details	US	US R&B/ HH	US Rap	AUS	CAN	GER	UK	Certifications
My Krazy Life	Released: March 18, 2014; Label: Pushaz Ink, CTE World, Def Jam; Formats: CD, LP, digital download	2	1	1	68	10	94	76	RIAA: Platinum
Still Brazy	Released: June 14, 2016; Label: 4Hunnid, CTE World, Def Jam; Formats: CD, LP, digital download	6	3	3	24	19	—	167	RIAA: Gold
Stay Dangerous	Released: August 3, 2018; Label: 4Hunnid, Def Jam; Formats: CD, LP, cassette, digital download	5	5	5	15	9	—	—	RIAA: Gold
4Real 4Real	Released: May 24, 2019; Label: 4Hunnid, Def Jam; Formats: CD, LP, digital download	7	5	4	25	8	89	—	RIAA: Gold
My Life 4Hunnid	Released: October 2, 2020; Label: 4Hunnid, Def Jam; Formats: Digital download, streaming	4	3	3	56	35	—	—	
I Got Issues	Released: September 30, 2022; Label: 4Hunnid, Def Jam; Formats: Digital download, streaming	18	12	8	—	—	—	—	
The Gentlemen's Club	Released: June 19, 2026; Label: 4Hunnid, 10K Projects; Formats: Digital download, streaming, LP	—	—	—	—	—	—	—	
"—" denotes a recording that did not chart or was not released in that territory.

=== Collaborative albums ===
List of collaborative albums, with selected chart positions
Title	Album details	Peak chart positions	
Title	Album details	US	US R&B/ HH
Kommunity Service (with Mozzy)	Released: May 21, 2021; Label: 4Hunnid, Mozzy, Empire; Format: Digital download, streaming	88	44
Hit Me When U Leave the Klub: The Playlist (with Tyga)	Released: September 29, 2023; Label: 4Hunnid, Last Kings, Empire; Format: Digital download, streaming	101	44

=== Soundtrack albums ===
List of soundtrack albums, with selected chart positions and sales figures
Title	Album details	Peak chart positions			Sales
Title	Album details	US	US R&B /HH	US Rap	Sales
Blame It On the Streets	Released: December 15, 2014; Label: Pushaz Ink, CTE World, Def Jam; Formats: CD, digital download	118	10	7	US: 90,000

== Mixtapes ==
List of mixtapes, with selected chart positions
Title	Mixtape details	Peak chart positions
Title	Mixtape details	US
4Fingaz	Released: May 12, 2009; Label: Pushaz Ink; Format: Digital download	—
The Real 4Fingaz	Released: November 16, 2009; Label: Pushaz Ink; Format: Digital download	—
Just Re'd Up	Released: May 2, 2011; Label: Pushaz Ink; Format: Digital download	—
Young and Hung...over (with Ty Dolla Sign and Bobby Brackins)	Released: June 17, 2011; Label: Pushaz Ink; Format: Digital download	—
4Hunnid Degreez	Released: March 26, 2012; Label: Pushaz Ink; Format: Digital download	—
Just Re'd Up 2	Released: January 21, 2013; Label: Pushaz Ink; Format: Digital download	—
Boss Yo Life Up Gang (with CTE World)	Released: August 13, 2013; Label: CTE World; Format: Digital download	—
California Livin' (with Blanco and DB Tha General)	Released: September 24, 2015; Label: Guerilla Entertainment; Format: Digital download	—
Red Friday	Released: November 25, 2016; Label: 4Hunnid; Format: Digital download	113
4hunnid Presents: Gang Affiliated (with Day Sulan and D3szn)	Released: March 5, 2021; Label: 4Hunnid, Epic; Format: Digital download	—
Just Re'd Up 3	Released: August 16, 2024; Label: 4Hunnid, BMG; Formats: Digital download, streaming	151
"—" denotes a recording that did not chart or was not released in that territory.

== Singles ==
=== As lead artist ===
List of singles as lead artist, with selected chart positions and certifications, showing year released and album name
Title	Year	Peak chart positions										Certifications	Album
Title	Year	US	US R&B /HH	US Rap	AUS	BEL (FL) Tip.	CAN	FRA	SWE	UK	UK R&B	Certifications	Album
"Toot It and Boot It" (featuring Ty Dolla Sign)	2010	67	60	12	—	—	—	—	—	—	—	RIAA: Platinum	The Real 4Fingaz
"Patty Cake"	2011	—	—	—	—	—	—	—	—	—	—		The Real 4Fingaz
"Bitches Ain't Shit" (featuring Snoop Dogg, Tyga, and Nipsey Hussle)	2012	100	—	—	—	—	—	—	—	—	—		Just Re'd Up
"#Grindmode" (featuring 2 Chainz and Nipsey Hussle)	2012	—	—	—	—	—	—	—	—	—	—		4 Hunnid Degreez
"You Broke" (featuring Nipsey Hussle)	2013	—	—	—	—	—	—	—	—	—	—	RIAA: Gold	Just Re'd Up 2
"My Nigga" (featuring Jeezy and Rich Homie Quan)	2013	19	5	3	69	50	62	106	50	53	11	RIAA: 5× Platinum; BPI: Gold; MC: Gold	My Krazy Life
"Left, Right" (featuring DJ Mustard)	2013	—	44	—	—	—	—	—	—	—	—	RIAA: Gold	My Krazy Life
"Who Do You Love?" (featuring Drake)	2014	54	15	4	—	77	—	197	—	87	16	RIAA: 2× Platinum	My Krazy Life
"Do It to Ya" (featuring TeeFlii)	2014	—	—	—	—	—	—	—	—	—	—		My Krazy Life
"2015 Flow"	2014	—	—	—	—	—	—	—	—	—	—		Blame It On the Streets
"Ride Out" (with Kid Ink, Tyga, Wale, and Rich Homie Quan)	2015	70	22	14	44	62	48	51	—	70	—	RIAA: Gold	Furious 7
"Twist My Fingaz"	2015	—	—	—	—	—	—	—	—	—	—	RIAA: Gold	Still Brazy
"FDT (Fuck Donald Trump)" (featuring Nipsey Hussle)	2016	— (Note: "FDT (Fuck Donald Trump)" did not enter the Billboard Hot 100, but peaked at number ten on the Bubbling Under Hot 100 Singles chart.)	50	—	—	—	—	—	—	—		RIAA: Gold	Still Brazy
"Why You Always Hatin?" (featuring Drake and Kamaiyah)	2016	62	18	13	—	—	72	—	—	—	—	RIAA: 2× Platinum	Still Brazy
"FDT, Pt. 2" (featuring G-Eazy and Macklemore)	2016	—	—	—	—	—	—	—	—	—	—		Non-album single
"One Time Comin'"	2016	—	—	—	—	—	—	—	—	—	—		Red Friday
"Pop It, Shake It" (featuring DJ Mustard)	2017	—	—	—	—	—	—	—	—	—	—		Non-album singles
"Fuck It Up"	2017	—	—	—	—	—	—	—	—	—	—		Non-album singles
"YNS" (featuring Blac Youngsta and YFN Lucci)	2017	—	—	—	—	—	—	—	—	—	—		Non-album singles
"Suu Whoop"	2018	—	—	—	—	—	—	—	—	—	—	RIAA: Gold	Stay Dangerous
"Big Bank" (featuring 2 Chainz, Big Sean, and Nicki Minaj)	2018	16	13	11	—	—	51	—	—	—	—	RIAA: 5× Platinum; MC: Gold	Stay Dangerous
"Mo Paper" (featuring Rich the Kid)	2018	—	—	—	—	—	—	—	—	—	—		Non-album single
"Stop Snitchin"	2019	98	40	—	—	—	—	—	—	—	—	RIAA: Platinum	4Real 4Real
"Go Loko" (featuring Tyga and Jon Z)	2019	49	18	16	41	21	30	—	— (Note: "Go Loko" did not enter the Swedish Singellista Chart, but peaked at number one on the Swedish Heatseeker Chart.)	—	—	RIAA: 2× Platinum	4Real 4Real
"Mamacita" (with Tyga and Carlos Santana)	2019	—	—	—	—	—	—	—	—	—	—		Non-album singles
"Konclusions" (with Kehlani)	2020	—	—	—	—	—	—	—	—	—	—		Non-album singles
"Laugh Now Kry Later!"	2020	—	—	—	—	—	—	—	—	—	—		My Life 4Hunnid
"FTP"	2020	—	—	—	—	—	—	—	—	—	—		My Life 4Hunnid
"Swag"	2020	—	—	—	—	—	—	—	—	—	—		My Life 4Hunnid
"Money Mouf" (with Tyga and Saweetie)	2020	—	—	—	—	—	—	—	—	—	—		Non-album singles
"Equinox" (featuring Day Sulan)	2020	—	—	—	—	—	—	—	—	—	—		Non-album singles
"Out on Bail"	2020	—	—	—	—	—	—	—	—	—	—		My Life 4Hunnid
"Hit Em Up" (featuring D3szn and Day Sulan)	2021	—	—	—	—	—	—	—	—	—	—		4hunnid Presents: Gang Affiliated
"Go Big" (with Big Sean)	2021	—	—	—	—	—	—	—	—	—	—		Coming 2 America (Amazon Original Motion Picture Soundtrack)
"Bompton to Oak Park" (with Mozzy)	2021	—	—	—	—	—	—	—	—	—	—		Kommunity Service
"Perfect Timing" (with Mozzy and Blxst)	2021	—	—	—	—	—	—	—	—	—	—		Kommunity Service
"Sign Language"	2021	—	—	—	—	—	—	—	—	—	—		Non-album single
"Scared Money" (featuring J. Cole and Moneybagg Yo)	2022	73	25	17	—	—	75	—	—	—	—	RIAA: Gold	I Got Issues
"Run" (with Tyga and 21 Savage featuring Bia)	2022	—	—	—	—	—	—	—	—	—	—		Non-album single
"Toxic"	2022	81	23	16	—	—	—	—	—	—	—		I Got Issues
"Alone"	2022	—	—	—	—	—	—	—	—	—	—		I Got Issues
"Maniac"	2022	—	—	—	—	—	—	—	—	—	—		I Got Issues
"Miss My Dawgs" (with Lil Wayne)	2022	—	—	—	—	—	—	—	—	—	—		Non-album single
"Let's Ride" (with The Notorious B.I.G. featuring Lambo4oe, Ty Dolla Sign, and Bone Thugs-n-Harmony)	2023	—	—	—	—	—	—	—	—	—	—		Fast X: Original Motion Picture Soundtrack
"Platinum" (with Tyga)	2023	—	—	—	—	—	—	—	—	—	—		Hit Me When U Leave the Klub: The Playlist
"Birthday" (with Saweetie and Tyga)	2023	—	—	—	—	—	—	—	—	—	—		Non-album single
"Brand New" (with Tyga and Lil Wayne)	2023	— (Note: "Brand New" did not enter the Billboard Hot 100, but peaked at number one on the Bubbling Under Hot 100 Singles chart.)	34	—	—	—	—	—	—	—	—		Hit Me When U Leave the Klub: The Playlist
"Knocka"	2024	—	—	—	—	—	—	—	—	—	—		Just Re'd Up 3
"Weird"	2024	—	—	—	—	—	—	—	—	—	—		Non-album singles
"Shake" (with Kaliii and Stunna Girl)	2024	—	—	—	—	—	—	—	—	—	—		Non-album singles
"Stupid" (with Lil Yachty and Blueface Ray)	2024	—	—	—	—	—	—	—	—	—	—		Non-album singles
"Love Make"	2024	—	—	—	—	—	—	—	—	—	—		Non-album singles
"2004" (featuring Buddy and the Gang)	2025	—	—	—	—	—	—	—	—	—	—		The Gentlemen's Club
"Hollywood" (with Shoreline Mafia)	2025	— (Note: "Hollywood" did not enter the Billboard Hot 100, but peaked at number three on the Bubbling Under Hot 100 Singles chart.)	18	11	—	—	—	—	—	—	—	RIAA: Gold	The Gentlemen's Club
"Lovers or Friends" (with Leon Thomas)	2025	—	—	—	—	—	—	—	—	—	—		The Gentlemen's Club
"State of Emergency"	2026	—	—	—	—	—	—	—	—	—	—		The Gentlemen's Club
"Teach You How to Luh Me" (with Ty Dolla Sign)	2026	—	—	—	—	—	—	—	—	—	—		The Gentlemen's Club
"Red People" (with The Game, Swizz Beatz & Timbaland)	2026	—	—	—	—	—	—	—	—	—	—		Non-album single
"—" denotes a recording that did not chart or was not released in that territory.

=== As featured artist ===
List of singles as featured artist, with selected chart positions and certifications, showing year released and album name
Title	Year	Peak chart positions										Certifications	Album
Title	Year	US	US R&B /HH	US Rap	AUS	BEL (FL) Tip.	CAN	FRA	GER	UK	UK R&B	Certifications	Album
"F Y'all" (Ty Dolla Sign featuring YG)	2011	—	—	—	—	—	—	—	—	—	—		House on the Hill
"Function" (E-40 featuring YG, Iamsu! and Problem)	2012	— (Note: "Function" did not enter the Billboard Hot 100, but peaked at number 21 on the Bubbling Under Hot 100 Singles chart.)	62	22	—	—	—	—	—	—	—	RIAA: Gold	The Block Brochure: Welcome to the Soil 2
"Like I Got a Gun" (Colette Carr featuring YG)	2012	—	—	—	—	—	—	—	—	—	—		Skitszo
"Act Right" (Yo Gotti featuring Jeezy and YG)	2013	100	33	24	—	—	—	—	—	—	—	RIAA: Platinum	I Am
"Still Wit the Bullshit" (The Relativez featuring YG)	2013	—	—	—	—	—	—	—	—	—	—		Non-album single
"Turn Up" (Slim 400 featuring YG and Kidoe)	2013	—	—	—	—	—	—	—	—	—	—		C-4 Presents: 25/8
"Hoe" (Kirko Bangz featuring YG and Yo Gotti)	2014	—	— (Note: "Hoe" did not enter the Hot R&B/Hip-Hop Songs chart, but peaked at number ten on the Bubbling Under R&B/Hip-Hop Singles chart.)	—	—	—	—	—	—	—	—		Bigger Than Me
"Vato" (DJ Mustard featuring Jeezy, Que and YG)	2014	—	—	—	—	—	—	—	—	—	—		Non-album singles
"nEXt" (Remix) (Sevyn Streeter featuring YG)	2014	—	—	—	—	—	—	—	—	—	—		Non-album singles
"Don't Tell 'Em" (Jeremih featuring YG)	2014	6	2	—	14	7	30	43	57	5	1	RIAA: 5× Platinum; ARIA: Platinum; BPI: 2× Platinum	Late Nights
"L.A. Love (La La)" (Remix) (Fergie featuring YG)	2014	—	—	—	—	—	—	—	—	—	—		Double Dutchess
"Backflip" (Casey Veggies featuring YG and Iamsu!)	2014	—	—	—	—	—	—	—	—	—	—		Live & Grow
"Only Right" (Ty Dolla Sign featuring YG, Joe Moses and TeeCee4800)	2015	—	—	—	—	—	—	—	—	—	—		Free TC
"Wuzhanindoe" (Gunplay featuring YG)	2015	—	—	—	—	—	—	—	—	—	—		Living Legend
"I Don't" (Mariah Carey featuring YG)	2017	89	35	—	—	—	96	101	—	—	—		Non-album singles
"Childish" (Bobo Norco featuring YG)	2017	—	—	—	—	—	—	—	—	—	—		Non-album singles
"Want Her" (DJ Mustard featuring Quavo and YG)	2017	—	—	—	—	—	—	—	—	—	—	RIAA: Platinum	Cold Summer
"Gucci on My" (Mike Will Made It featuring 21 Savage, YG and Migos)	2017	— (Note: "Gucci On My" did not enter the Billboard Hot 100, but peaked at number ten on the Bubbling Under Hot 100 Singles chart.)	41	—	—	—	—	—	—	—	—		Ransom 2
"Bruisin" (Slim 400 featuring YG and Sadboy Loko)	2017	—	—	—	—	—	—	—	—	—	—		All Blassik
"Extra Luv" (Future featuring YG)	2017	99	42	—	—	—	85	—	—	—	—		Future
"Last Time That I Checc'd" (Nipsey Hussle featuring YG)	2018	76	29	24	—	—	—	—	—	—	—	RIAA: Gold	Victory Lap
"Proud" (2 Chainz featuring YG and Offset)	2018	96	43	—	—	—	—	—	—	—	—	RIAA: Gold	The Play Don't Care Who Makes It
"DTF" (The Game featuring YG, Ty Dolla Sign, and Jeremih)	2018	—	—	—	—	—	—	—	33	—	—		Non-album singles
"Facts" (Chantel Jeffries featuring YG, Rich The Kid, and BIA)	2019	—	—	—	—	—	—	—	—	—	—		Non-album singles
"Make It Drop" (Riff Raff featuring YG)	2019	—	—	—	—	—	—	—	—	—	—		Non-album singles
"La La Land" (Bryce Vine featuring YG)	2019	75	—	—	—	—	—	—	—	—	—	RIAA: Platinum; MC: Gold	Carnival
"West Coast" (with G-Eazy featuring Blueface and Allblack)	2019	— (Note: "West Coast" did not chart on the Billboard Hot 100, but did peak at number one on the Bubbling Under Hot 100 chart.)	—	37	—	81	—	—	—	—	—	RIAA: Gold	Beats (soundtrack)
"Slide" (H.E.R. featuring YG)	2019	43	31	—	—	—	—	—	—	—	—	RIAA: 3× Platinum; MC: 2× Platinum	Back of My Mind
"Spicy (Remix)" (Ty Dolla Sign featuring J Balvin, YG, Tyga, and Post Malone)	2021	—	—	—	—	—	—	—	—	—	—		Non-album single
"Gangsta" (Karan Aujla featuring YG)	2022	—	—	—	—	—	—	—	—	—	—		Way Ahead
"Gang Gang Gangland" (with Chef Boy and E-40 featuring Mozzy)	2025	—	—	—	—	—	—	—	—	—	—		TBA
"—" denotes a recording that did not chart or was not released in that territory.

== Promotional singles ==
Title	Year	Peak chart positions	Certifications	Album
Title	Year	US	Certifications	Album
"I Want a Benz" (featuring Nipsey Hussle and 50 Cent)	2015	—		Non-album single
"Still Brazy"	2016	—	RIAA: Gold	Still Brazy
"Word Is Bond" (featuring Slim 400)	2016	—		Still Brazy
"Handgun" (featuring ASAP Rocky)	2018	98		Stay Dangerous
"—" denotes a recording that did not chart or was not released in that territory.

== Other charted and certified songs ==
List of other charted and certified songs, with selected chart positions, showing year released and album name
Title	Year	Peak chart positions			Certifications	Album
Title	Year	US	US Bub. R&B	NZ Hot	Certifications	Album
"I Just Wanna Party" (featuring Schoolboy Q and Jay Rock)	2014	—	6	—	RIAA: Gold	My Krazy Life
"She Bad" (with Cardi B)	2018	57	—	—	RIAA: Platinum	Invasion of Privacy
"Bulletproof" (featuring Jay 305)	2018	— (Note: "Bulletproof" did not enter the Billboard Hot 100, but peaked at number 16 on the Bubbling Under Hot 100 Singles chart.)	3	—		Stay Dangerous
"Same Bitches" (Post Malone featuring G-Eazy and YG)	2018	—	—	—	ARIA: Platinum	Beerbongs & Bentleys
"Lies" (Schoolboy Q featuring Ty Dolla Sign and YG)	2019	—	—	—		Crash Talk
"Hard Bottoms & White Socks"	2019	—	—	—		4Real 4Real
"Bottle Service"	2019	—	—	—		4Real 4Real
"In the Dark"	2019	— (Note: "In the Dark" did not enter the Billboard Hot 100, but peaked at number nine on the Bubbling Under Hot 100 Singles chart.)	—	—	RIAA: Gold	4Real 4Real
"YKTV" (Nas featuring A Boogie Wit Da Hoodie and YG)	2021	— (Note: "YKTV" did not enter the Billboard Hot 100, but peaked at number 22 on the Bubbling Under Hot 100 chart.)	—	—		King's Disease II
"Do It" (Kanye West and Ty Dolla Sign as ¥$ featuring YG)	2024	52	—	—		Vultures 1
"On the Low" (featuring Tyler, the Creator)	2026	—	—	26		The Gentlemen's Club
"—" denotes a recording that did not chart or was not released in that territory.

== Guest appearances ==
List of non-single guest appearances, with other performing artists, showing year released and album name
Title	Year	Other artist(s)	Album
"Ready for War"	2006	Jay Rock	Watts Finest, Vol. 1
"Making Love"	2009	Mario C	So F1lthy Boy
"Grapes & Optimos"	2009	Mr. Skrillz, Reek Daddy, Sumthin Terrible, Do It Movin', Nino Da Block Controlla	Sacto 2 Da Crest
"Da Club"	2011	211	—N/a
"Crush on You"	2011	New Boyz	Too Cool to Care
"Good Pussy"	2011	Problem	Hotels
"Yo Bitch"	2011	Travis Porter	Differenter 3
"Thas Wat Hoes Do"	2011	Nipsey Hussle, Rimpau	The Marathon Continues
"You"	2011	Iggy Azalea	Ignorant Art
"Every City"	2012	Freddie Gibbs	Baby Face Killa
"LA Confidential"	2012	Blanco, Nipsey Hussle	Raw
"Basshead"	2012	Far East Movement	Dirty Bass
"Knockin'"	2012	Jeremih, E-40	Late Nights with Jeremih
"What They Doin'"	2012	Kid Ink	Rocketshipshawty
"Just Got Word"	2012	Young Jeezy	It's tha World
"Gang Bang"	2013	Joe Moses	From Nothing to Something 2
"Gettin Tho'd"	2013	Paul Wall, Kid Ink	Checkseason
"9 Outta 10"	2013	Travis Porter	Mr. Porter
"R.I.P." (Remix)	2013	Young Jeezy, Chris Brown, Kendrick Lamar	—N/a
"Homie"	2013	Funkmaster Flex, Young Jeezy	Who You Mad At? Me Or Yourself?
"Duck Hunt"	2013	Blanco, The Jacka, Nipsey Hussle, Messy Marv	Game Over
"Bad Ass" (Remix)	2013	Kid Ink, Problem	—N/a
"Hella Ice"	2013	Doughboyz Cashout	#ItsThaWorld
"Make a Movie"	2013	Philthy Rich, I-Rocc, Macktown	N.E.R.N.L. 2
"Burn Rubber"	2013	DJ Mustard, Joe Moses	Ketchup
"Take It to the Neck"	2013	DJ Mustard, Clyde Carson	Ketchup
"Been from the Gang"	2013	DJ Mustard, Kay Ess, Nipsey Hussle, RJ	Ketchup
"See Me Gettin' Money"	2013	DJ Mustard, Cash Out, K. Smith	Ketchup
"Hella"	2013	Wale, Dom Kennedy	The Gifted
"Versace"	2013	Kirko Bangz, French Montana, G-Haze	Progression III
"Bossin' Up" (Remix)	2013	Kid Ink, Young Jeezy	—N/a
"Street Tides"	2013	Young Scooter	From the Cell Block to Your Block
"Yayo" (Remix)	2014	Snootie Wild, Fabolous, Jadakiss, French Montana	Chapter One
"For a Week"	2014	Mike Jay, Too $hort	The Mike Jay EP
"Bompton City G's"	2014	Slim 400	Keepin It 400
"Do Yo Gudda" (Remix)	2014	Hitta J3, Kendrick Lamar, Problem	—N/a
"Grimey Thirsty"	2014	Far East Movement	KTown Riot
"Party Up"	2014	Destructo	West Coast EP
"Type of Shit I Hate"	2014	Ty Dolla Sign, Fabolous	Sign Language
"This Side"	2014	ASAP Ferg	Ferg Forever
"On My Set" (Remix)	2015	Slim 400, Big Quis, Hunyae	Foe Block
"The Realest"	2015	Jeezy, DJ Drama	Gangsta Party
"Last Night"	2015	Krept and Konan	The Long Way Home
"I Like New"	2015	Chanel West Coast	Waves
"Up on the Wall"	2015	The Game, Problem, Ty Dolla Sign	The Documentary 2.5
"Buzzin"	2015	Lyrica Anderson, The Game	Hello
"Bolo Tie"	2016	Macklemore & Ryan Lewis	This Unruly Mess I've Made
"Fuck Up the Club"	2016	DJ Khaled, Future, Rick Ross, Yo Gotti	Major Key
"Been a Long Time"	2016	DJ Mustard, Ty Dolla Sign	Cold Summer
"Party"	2016	DJ Mustard, Young Thug	Cold Summer
"No No No"	2016	O.T. Genasis	Coke N Butter
"All Around Me"	2017	Lil Yachty, Kamaiyah	Teenage Emotions
"Ex"	2017	Ty Dolla Sign	Beach House 3
"All Around the World"	2017	Jay 305	Taking All Bets
"Not to Be"	2017	RJ	MrLA
"Westside Love"	2017	Marc E. Bassy	Gossip Columns
"Hold On Me"	2017	Mozzy, G-Eazy, Lex Aura	Fake Famous
"Pressure"	2017	Jeezy, Kodak Black	Pressure
"How Many Liccs"	2017	TeeCee4800	Realness Over Millions 2
"Don't Make Me Look Stupid"	2017	RJ, DJ Mustard	The Ghetto
"Same Bitches"	2018	Post Malone, G-Eazy	beerbongs & bentleys
"Juice"	2018	Bhad Bhabie	15
"Plug Walk"(Remix)	2018	Rich The Kid, Gucci Mane, 2 Chainz	—N/a
"Thugz Mansion"	2018	Mozzy, Ty Dolla Sign	Gangland Landlord
"Curry Jersey"	2018	Moneybagg Yo	RESET
"We Ain't Homies"	2018	Arin Ray	Platinum Fire
"Don't Mess"	2018	24hrs	HOUSES IN THE HILL
"Mo Paper"	2018	Rich The Kid	—N/a
"Dangerous World"	2018	DJ Mustard, Travis Scott	—N/a
"Ayy"	2019	Berner, Mozzy, Logic	Slimey Individualz
"On God"	2019	DJ Mustard, Tyga, ASAP Ferg, ASAP Rocky	Perfect Ten
"100 Bands"	2019	DJ Mustard, Quavo, Meek Mill	Perfect Ten
"I Came Up"	2019	Casey Veggies, E-40, Bino Rideaux	Organic
"Blue Face Hunnids"	2019	Snoop Dogg, Mustard	I Wanna Thank Me
"Ni**as Fa Life"	2019	J Stone	The Definition of Loyalty
"This Side"	2019	Burna Boy	African Giant
"Fight The Power: Remix 2020"	2020	Public Enemy, Nas, Rapsody, Black Thought, Jahi ,Questlove	What You Gonna Do When the Grid Goes Down?
"YKTV"	2021	Nas, A Boogie Wit da Hoodie	King's Disease II
"Memories (Remix)"	2021	Maroon 5, Nipsey Hussle	Jordi
"Instructions"	2021	G-Eazy	These Things Happen Too
"Stay Down"	2022	Lul G, YK Osiris	Came from Nothing
"Outside"	2022	The Game, Osbe Chill, The Mass	Drillmatic – Heart vs. Mind
"BOYFRIEND, GIRLFRIEND"	2023	Tyler The Creator	CALL ME IF YOU GET LOST
"Do It"	2024	¥$ (Kanye West, Ty Dolla Sign)	Vultures 1
"100 Days"	2024	Jay Park, P-Lo	The One You Wanted
"The Part"	2026	The Game, Lefty Gunplay, RJMrLA, Mark Lux, JasonMartin, Mike & Keys	The Documentary III

== Music videos ==
Year	Title	Director(s)	Featured Artist(s)
As main performer
2010	"Toot It And Boot It"	James Earl	
2011	"Bitches Ain't Shit"	Alex Nazari	
2012	"I'm A Thug"	Alex Nazari	Meek Mill
2012	"#Grindmode"	John Mazyck	2 Chainz, Nipsey Hussle
2012	"Keenon Jackson"	John Mazyck	
2012	"Drunk and High"	JordanTower Movies	
2013	"You Broke"	El Cid	Nipsey Hussle
2013	"IDGAF"	Jonathan Andrade	Will Claye
2013	"Click Clack"		ASAP Ferg
2013	"Sprung"	Jonathan Andrade	
2013	"My Nigga"	Motion Family	Jeezy, Rich Homie Quan
2013	"Ima Real 1"	John Colombo	
2014	"Left, Right"	Alex Nazari	DJ Mustard
2014	"My Nigga" (Remix)	Motion Family	Lil Wayne, Rich Homie Quan, Meek Mill, Nicki Minaj
2014	"Who Do You Love?"	Benny Boom	Drake
2014	"Bicken Back Being Bool"	Alex Nazari	
2014	"Do It To Ya"		TeeFLii
2014	"2015 Flow"		
2016	"FDT (Fuck Donald Trump)"	Austin Simkins	Nipsey Hussle
2016	"Still Brazy"	Psycho Films	
2016	"Word Is Bond"	2Tone	Slim 400
2016	"Why You Always Hatin?"	Joe Weil	Drake, Kamaiyah
2016	"FDT Pt. 2"	Matt Hobbs	G-Eazy, Macklemore
2016	"One Time Comin'"		
2017	"Pop It, Shake It"	Director X	DJ Mustard
2017	"YNS"		Blac Youngsta, YFN Lucci
2018	"Suu Whoop"	GoodBoyShady	
2018	"Big Bank"	Taj	2 Chainz, Big Sean, Nicki Minaj
2018	"Handgun"		A$AP Rocky
2018	"Bulletproof"	Austin Simkins	Jay 305
2018	"Slay"		Quavo
2019	"Stop Snitchin"		
2019	"Go Loko"	Colin Tilley	Tyga, Jon Z
2019	"In The Dark"	Colin Tilley	
2019	"Hard Bottoms & White Socks"		
2020	"FTP"	Denied Approval.	
2020	"Swag"	ARRAD	
2020	"Equinox"		Day Sulan
2020	"Out On Bail"	Austin Simkins	
2020	"Blood Walk"	Austin Simkins, Thomas Dang, Gloves Gang	Lil Wayne, D3szn
2021	"Hit Em Up"	Austin Simkins	D3szn, Day Sulan
2021	"Bailer"		
2021	"Perfect Timing"	SUJ	Mozzy, Blxst
2026	"OMG"	Kid Art	Pusha T
As featured performer
2012	"Function"		E-40, Iamsu! and Problem
2013	"Turnt Up"		Cookie Money
2013	"Act Right"		Yo Gotti, Jeezy
2013	"What They Doin'"	Matt Alonzo	Kid Ink
2014	"L.A.LOVE (la la)"		Fergie
2014	"All in a Day"		Berner, Young Thug, Vital
2014	"Cut Her Off (Remix)"		K Camp, Lil Boosie, Too Short
2014	"Next"		Sevyn Streeter
2015	"Only Right"	Alex Bittan	Ty $, Joe Moses & TeeCee4800
2015	"This Side (Remix)"		A$AP Ferg
2015	"Backflip"		Casey Veggies, Iamsu!
2015	"Wuzhanindoe"		Gunplay
2015	"Ride Out"	Payne Lindsey	Kid Ink, Wale, Tyga, Rich Homie Quan
2016	"Bruisin"		Slim 400, Sad Boy Loko
2016	"Last Night"		Krept and Konan
2016	"I Don't"		Mariah Carey
2016	"Want Her"		Mustard, Quavo
2017	"Gucci on My"		Mike Will Made-It, 21 Savage, Migos
2017	"Whatever You On"		London on da Track, Jeremih, Young Thug, Ty $
2017	"Extra Luv"		Future
2017	"Don't Make Me Look Stupid"		RJMrLA, Mustard
2018	"Last Time I Checc'd"	Sergio & Blacsam	Nipsey Hussle
2018	"I'm a Dog"	Alexandra Gavillet	Mitch
2018	"4 Days"	Millicent Hailes	Belly
2018	"Proud"		2 Chainz, Offset
2018	"Ex"		Ty $
2018	"We Ain't Homies"		Arin Ray
2018	"Juice"		Bhad Bhabie
2018	"Thugz Mansion"		Mozzy, Ty $
2019	"Lies"	Teyana “Spike Tee” Taylor	Schoolboy Q, Ty $
2019	"West Coast"		G-Eazy, ALLBLACK, Blueface
2019	"100 Bands"		Mustard, Quavo, Meek Mill
2019	"Bop"		Tyga, Blueface
2019	"Slide"		H.E.R.
2020	"Fight the Power 2020"		Public Enemy, Nas, Rapsody, Black Thought, Questlove
2020	"Go Live"		Mitch
2020	Moonwalking in Calabasas Remix"	@LewisYouNasty	DDG
2022	"Gangsta"		Karan Aujla
2022	"In My Face"		Mozzy, Saweetie, 2 Chainz
2024	"Hardaway"		Duki, Eladio Carrion
