= I Ain't Perfect =

I Ain't Perfect may refer to:

- "I Ain't Perfect", song by Huey Lewis and the News from the album Plan B, 2001
- "I Ain't Perfect", song by IV of Spades from the album ClapClapClap!, 2019
- "I Ain't Perfect", song by Mozzy from the album Beyond Bulletproof, 2020
- I Ain't Perfect, 2021 album by K Koke

== See also ==
- "I'm Not Perfect (But I'm Perfect for You)", song by Grace Jones, 1986
