= 1 Up Top Ahk =

Studio album by Mozzy
- Released: August 17, 2017
- Genre: Hip hop
- Length: 49:31
- Label: Mozzy Records; Empire
- Producer: David "DaveO" Grear (also exec.); Juneonnabeat; Jay Nari; A Dot the God; Daniel Cruz Beatz; Jay P. Bangz; MB13Beatz; Murda Beatz

Mozzy chronology
Dreadlocks & Headshots (2017)	1 Up Top Ahk (2017)	Gangland Landlord (2018)

Professional ratings
Review scores
Source	Rating
The Irish Times	3/5 stars
Pitchfork	7.6/10
XXL	4/5 (XL)

1 Up Top Ahk is the debut studio album by American rapper Mozzy from Sacramento, California. It was released on August 17, 2017, via Mozzy Records and Empire Distribution. Production was mostly handled by Juneonnabeat and David "DaveO" Grear, along with Jay Nari, Murda Beatz, Jay P Bangz, A Dot the God, MB13 Beatz, and Daniel Cruz Beatz. It features guest appearances from June, Bobby Luv, Boosie Badazz, Celly Ru, Dave East, DCMBR, E Mozzy, Jay Rock, Kolyon, Lex Aura, Lil Durk, Rexx Life Raj, The Jacka and YFN Lucci. The album peaked at number 68 on the Billboard 200.

Rolling Stone magazine ranked the album on 31st position of their 40 best rap albums of 2017.

== Track listing ==
No.	Title	Writer(s)	Producer(s)	Length
1.	"Intro"		Dave-O	0:35
2.	"Mandated" (featuring June)	T. Patterson; C. Washington	Juneonnabeat	2:45
3.	"Like You Say You Do"	T. Patterson	Juneonnabeat	2:21
4.	"Take It Up With God" (featuring Celly Ru)	T. Patterson; M. Young	Juneonnabeat	3:43
5.	"Sleep Walkin"	T. Patterson	Jay P Bangz	3:04
6.	"Tomorrow Ain't Promised" (featuring Boosie Badazz, Rexx Life Raj, and E Mozzy)	T. Patterson; T. Hatch; F. Wright; E Mozzy	Dave-O; A Dot the God	3:59
7.	"Unfortunately" (featuring June)	T. Patterson; C. Washington	Juneonnabeat	3:03
8.	"Don't You" (featuring June)	T. Patterson; C. Washington	Juneonnabeat	2:21
9.	"Momma We Made It" (featuring Jay Rock)	T. Patterson; J. McKinzie, Jr.	Juneonnabeat	3:52
10.	"Outside" (featuring Lil Durk, Dave East, and Lex Aura)	T. Patterson; D. Banks; D. Brewster, Jr.; Lex Aura	Murda Beatz	3:45
11.	"Stay Over There" (featuring YFN Lucci and Kolyon)	T. Patterson; R. Bennett; M. Lee	Dave-O; Jay Nari	3:23
12.	"M.I.P. Jacka" (featuring The Jacka)	T. Patterson; D. Newton	Dave-O; Jay Nari	3:02
13.	"Afraid" (featuring Dcmbr)	T. Patterson; K. Williams	Dave-O; MB13Beatz	3:47
14.	"Prayed for This"	T. Patterson	Juneonnabeat	2:33
15.	"Can't Take It (Ima Gangsta)" (featuring Bobby Luv)	T. Patterson; B. Turner	Dave-O; Daniel Cruz Beatz	3:22
16.	"Fall Off"	T. Patterson	Juneonnabeat	3:56
Total length:				49:31

== Charts ==
Chart (2017)	Peak position
US Billboard 200	68
US Top R&B/Hip-Hop Albums (Billboard)	36
US Independent Albums (Billboard)	7
US Top Tastemaker Albums (Billboard)	6
