= Survivor's Guilt (album) =

Studio album by Mozzy
- Released: July 22, 2022
- Genre: Hip hop
- Length: 42:59
- Label: Mozzy Records; CMG; Interscope
- Producer: Reece Beats; YB; Dave-O; Lul Zaye; Hardknock; Ace Soulja; Tariq Beats; Will Record Beats; Jay P Bangz; Fonzie; DeeMarc; Armani Depaul; YC; Real Red; Javar Rockamore; Motif Alumni; Caleb Bryant; Zuri; Kavin; Mustard; Aldaz; Lvl35Dav

Mozzy chronology
Untreated Trauma (2021)	Survivor's Guilt (2022)	Kollect Kall (2023)

Singles from Survivor's Guilt
- 1. "Real Ones" Released: February 11, 2022; 2. "Tell the Truth" Released: May 6, 2022; 3. "Lurkin'" Released: July 1, 2022; 4. "Open Arms" Released: July 14, 2022; 5. "In My Face" Released: July 18, 2022

Survivor's Guilt is the seventh studio album by American rapper Mozzy. It was released on July 22, 2022, via Mozzy Records, Collective Music Group, and Interscope Records. It features guest appearances from 2 Chainz, 42 Dugg, Blac Youngsta, Blxst, Celly Ru, E Mozzy, EST Gee, Roddy Ricch, Saweetie, Shordie Shordie, YG, and Yo Gotti. Production was handled by Reece Beats, YB, Dave-O, Lul Zaye, Hardknock, Ace Soulja, Tariq Beats, Will Record Beats, Jay P Bangz, Fonzie, DeeMarc, Armani Depaul, YC, Real Red, Javar Rockamore, Motif Alumni, Caleb Bryant, Zuri, Kavin, Mustard, Aldaz, and Lvl35Dav.

Survivor's Guilt is an album that was accompanied by several singles, including "Real Ones," "Tell the Truth," "Lurkin'," "Open Arms," and "In My Face." It marked his first release through CMG (Collective Music Group). The album achieved moderate success, reaching number 40 on the US Billboard 200 chart.

== Critical reception ==
Professional ratings
Review scores
Source	Rating
Pitchfork	7.1/10.
AllMusic	3.5/5 stars

Neil Yeung of AllMusic stated "His debut on Yo Gotti's Collective Music Group label, the introspective set continued to highlight the rapper's experiences with trauma and mental health struggles, delivered with his tried-and-true flow and thoughtful, intense production".

Pitchfork's Nadine Smith opined that "The delivery on Survivor’s Guilt is frequently melodic and the production ornate, but Mozzy's music is never quite pop, working more with tightly-packed verses and emotional storytelling than with hooks".

== Track listing ==
No.	Title	Writer(s)	Producer(s)	Length
1.	"Not the Same"	Timothy Patterson; Maurice Ivory; Malachi Haden	Reece Beats; YB	2:48
2.	"If You Love Me"	Timothy Patterson; Caleb Bryant; Charles Forsberg III; David Grear; Isaiah Chandavong	Dave-O; Lul Zaye	2:45
3.	"Lurkin'" (featuring EST Gee)	Timothy Patterson; David Grear Akhanovic; George Stone III; Victor Lassila	Dave-O; Hardknock	2:21
4.	"Tell the Truth" (with Shordie Shordie)	Altariq Crapps; David Grear Akhanovic; Raquan Hudson; Timothy Patterson	Ace Soulja; Dave-O; Tariq Beats	3:22
5.	"Murder on My Mind"	Altariq Crapps; David Grear Akhanovic; Maurice Ivory; Timothy Patterson; willie mccord	Reece Beats; Dave-O; Tariq Beats; Will Record Beats	3:08
6.	"Burrr"	David Grear Akhanovic; James Perez; Timothy Patterson	Daveo; Jay P Bangz	2:46
7.	"Wouldn't Be Us" (with YG and Blxst)	David Grear Akhanovic; Demario White; Keenon Jackson; Lucas Guevara; Matthew Burdette; Timothy Patterson	Daveo; Fonzie	2:22
8.	"Smoke Nuffin'" (featuring 42 Dugg)	David Grear Akhanovic; Demarcus Eugene Morgan; Dion Hayes; Timothy Patterson	Daveo; DeeMarc	2:13
9.	"4Life"	Altariq Crapps; David Grear Akhanovic; Timothy Patterson; willie mccord	Daveo; Tariq Beats; Will Record Beats	2:54
10.	"Make the News" (featuring Yo Gotti and Blac Youngsta)	David Grear Akhanovic; James Perez; Mario Mims; Sammie Benson; Timothy Patterson	Daveo; Jay P Bangz	3:30
11.	"What You Hollin'" (featuring E Mozzy and Celly Ru)	Armani DePaul; Eric Cry; Marcel Young; Timothy Patterson	Armani DePaul	2:56
12.	"Ain’t Really Real"	Christopher Pearson; Javar Rockamore; Jorres Nelson; Marcus Rucker; Timothy Patterson	YC; Real Red; Javar Rockamore; Motif Alumni	2:39
13.	"Open Arms"	Caleb Bryant; David Grear Akhanovic; Timothy Patterson; Tzurel Halfon	Caleb Bryant; Daveo; Zuri; Kavin	2:44
14.	"In My Face" (with 2 Chainz and Saweetie featuring YG)	Diamonté Harper; Dijon McFarlane; Keenon Jackson; Tauheed Epps; Timothy Patterson	Mustard	3:21
15.	"Real Ones" (featuring Roddy Ricch)	Christopher Pearson; Daniel Yunuen Aldaz Leander; Davood Boushehri; Rodrick Moore; Timothy Patterson	YC; Aldaz; Lvl35Dav	3:03
Total length:				42:59

== Personnel ==
Performers

- Mozzy - primary artist
- EST Gee - featured artist (track 3)
- Shordie Shordie - featured artist (track 4)
- YG - featured artist (tracks 7 and 14)
- Blxst - featured artist (track 7)
- 42 Dugg - featured artist (track 8)
- Yo Gotti - featured artist (track 10)
- Blac Youngsta - featured artist (track 10)
- Celly Ru - featured artist (track 11)
- E Mozzy - featured artist (track 11)
- 2 Chainz - featured artist (track 14)
- Saweetie - featured artist (track 14)
- Roddy Ricch - featured artist (track 15)

Technical

- Chris Longwood - mastering engineer (tracks 1–2, 5–12)
- Franklin "Piece" Perez - mixer (tracks 1–14), mastering engineer (track 3), recording engineer (tracks 1, 3–12)
- Christian "CQ" Quinonez - mixer (tracks 1–2, 5–12, 15)
- DaBoyDame for CMG - A&R (tracks 1–7, 9–14)
- Bella Smith - A&R (tracks 1–7, 9–14)

Production

- Reece Beats - producer (tracks 1 and 5)
- YB - producer (track 1)
- Dave-O - producer (tracks 2–10, 13)
- Lul Zaye - producer (track 2)
- Hardknock - producer (track 3)
- Ace Soulja - producer (track 4)
- Tariq Beats - producer (tracks 4, 5, and 9)
- Will Record Beats - producer (tracks 5 and 9)
- Jay P Bangz - producer (tracks 6 and 10)
- Fonzie - producer (track 7)
- DeeMarc - producer (track 8)
- Armani Depaul - producer (track 11)
- YC - producer (tracks 12 and 15)
- Real Red - producer (track 12)
- Javar Rockamore - producer (track 12)
- Motif Alumni - producer (track 12)
- Caleb Bryant - producer (track 13)
- Zuri - producer (track 13)
- Kavin - producer (track 13)
- Mustard - producer (track 14)
- Aldaz - producer (track 15)
- Lvl35Dav - producer (track 15)

== Charts ==
Chart (2022)	Peak position
US Billboard 200	40
US Top R&B/Hip-Hop Albums (Billboard)	23
US Top Rap Albums (Billboard)	14
