= Gangland Landlord =

Studio album by Mozzy
- Released: October 5, 2018
- Genre: Hip hop
- Length: 55:23
- Label: Mozzy Records; Empire
- Producer: Nima Etminan (exec.); David "DaveO" Grear (also exec.); Ben Billions; Daniel Cruz; James Royo; Jay P. Bangz; Jay Nari; Juneonnabeat; Kacey Khaliel; Mook on the Beats; OG Parker; Reece Beats; Rellymade; Streetrunner; Tarik Azzouz

Mozzy chronology
1 Up Top Ahk (2017)	Gangland Landlord (2018)	Chow Time (2018)

Professional ratings
Review scores
Source	Rating
Rolling Stone	3/5 stars

Gangland Landlord is the second studio album by American rapper Mozzy. It was released on October 5, 2018, via Mozzy Records and Empire Distribution. The album is a sequel to his 2015 project Gangland Landscape. Production was handled by fourteen record producers, including David "DaveO" Grear, Jay P Bangz, James Royo, Jay Nari, Juneonnabeat, OG Parker, Ben Billions and Daniel Cruz Beatz. It features guest appearances from A Boogie wit da Hoodie, Blac Youngsta, Caine, Celly Ru, DCMBR, Dej Loaf, E Mozzy, Iamsu!, Rayven Justice, Rexx Life Raj, Schoolboy Q, Teejay3k, Too $hort, Trae tha Truth, Ty Dolla $ign, YFN Lucci, YG, Yhung T.O. and Yo Gotti. The album peaked at number 57 on the Billboard 200.

== Track listing ==
No.	Title	Producer(s)	Length
1.	"No Way (Intro)"	Dave-O; Jay Nari	2:01
2.	"One of Mines"	Juneonnabeat	2:53
3.	"Not Impressive"	Jay P Bangz	2:26
4.	"Thugz Mansion" (featuring Ty Dolla Sign and YG)	DJ Swift; Dave-O; Ben Billions; Mook On The Beats	3:06
5.	"Dead Homies" (featuring E Mozzy)	Jay P Bangz	3:41
6.	"Bands on Me" (featuring Blac Youngsta, A Boogie wit da Hoodie, and Teejay3k)	Dave-O; Jay Nari	3:06
7.	"Keep Me Hustlin" (featuring Rexx Life Raj)	StreetRunner; Tarik Azzouz	3:26
8.	"Walk With a Limp" (featuring YFN Lucci)	OG Parker	3:28
9.	"Run It Up" (featuring Schoolboy Q and Caine)	James Royo	4:04
10.	"My Brudda 2x" (featuring Celly Ru and Trae tha Truth)	Jay P Bangz	3:44
11.	"Black Hearted"	Daniel Cruz Beatz	3:10
12.	"Walk-Up"	James Royo	2:38
13.	"Excuse Me" (featuring Too Short, Yhung T.O., and Dcmbr)	Reece Beats	3:10
14.	"Famous (I'm The One)" (featuring Iamsu!, Yo Gotti, and Dej Loaf)	Juneonnabeat	3:25
15.	"Who Want Problems"	Jay P Bangz	2:45
16.	"Choke on Me"	Kacey Khaliel	2:32
17.	"Run to the Mansion"	Dave-O; Rellymade	3:41
18.	"Tear Me Down (Outro)" (featuring Rayven Justice)	Dave-O	2:07
Total length:			55:23

== Charts ==
Chart (2018)	Peak position
US Billboard 200	57
US Top R&B/Hip-Hop Albums (Billboard)	27
US Top Rap Albums (Billboard)	25
US Independent Albums (Billboard)	9
