= Just Re'd Up 3 =

Mixtape by YG
- Released: August 16, 2024
- Genre: Hip-hop; West Coast hip-hop
- Length: 55:04
- Label: BMG; 4Hunnid
- Producer: All Action; Backnine Z; Bandz; Bankroll Got It; Camper; Charley Cooks; Diego Ave; DJ Vision; DTP; E White; Elie Rizk; FnZ; FranchiseDidIt; IceNberg; Jasper Harris; Jaywavy; Julia Lewis; Kam Jackson; KayKay; Larry Jayy; Lee Major; Lilbro; Lil Rich; Lucky Keys; Mike Crook; Mustard; Richard Moorings; S2Kizzy; Sean Momberger; Sorry Jaynari; Swish; Tyler Hooks; Wax Motif; Wheezy; Whitlock Beats; Yung Roda

YG chronology
Hit Me When U Leave the Klub: The Playlist (2023)	Just Re'd Up 3 (2024)	The Gentlemen's Club (2026)

Singles from Just Re'd Up 3
- 1. "Knocka" Released: April 25, 2024; 2. "Stupid" Released: July 9, 2024; 3. "Love Make" Released: August 2, 2024

Just Re'd Up 3 is a commercial mixtape by American rapper YG. It was released on August 16, 2024, through BMG Rights Management and 4Hunnid Records. It features guest appearances by Babyface Ray, G Herbo, Larry June, Lil Yachty, Mozzy, Saweetie, Tee Grizzley, Diamond Platnumz, Kalan.FrFr, and Ty Dolla Sign. It is the sequel of his 2013 mixtape Just Re'd Up 2.

== Background ==
On April 25, 2024, YG released the first single of the project entitled "Knocka".

On May 20, 2024, he announced the release of Just Re'd Up 3. He also revealed dates for the accompanying "Just Re'd Up Tour", which would feature support from Cleveland rapper Doe Boy and his longtime disc jockey, DJ Vision.

On July 9, 2024, he released the second single entitled "Stupid" which features Babyface Ray and Lil Yachty.

On August 2, 2024, he released the third single entitled "Love Make".

On August 28, 2024, it was revealed that the project made a rather disappointing debut on the Billboard 200 with only 8,000 copies sold in the first week.

== Track listing ==
Credits adapted from Tidal.

Volume 1 track listing
No.	Title	Writer(s)	Producer(s)	Length
1.	"Go Brazy" (with Mustard and Baby Stone Gorillas)	Keenon Jackson; Dijon McFarlane; Leigh Elliott; Sean Momberger; Paul Momberger; Larry Sanders II	Mustard	2:40
2.	"Right Now"	Ke. Jackson; McFarlane; Sanders; Jason Wilkinson	Mustard	2:42
3.	"Only Fans" (with Jaye Anderson)	Ke. Jackson; Jason Anderson; Lucky Specht; Lashawn Marshall; Danilo Kozlov; Sanders	Lucky Keys; DJ Vision; Larry Jayy	2:36
4.	"She Pretty" (with Saweetie)	Ke. Jackson; Diamonté Harper; Ryan Smolyanitsky; Maxwell J Roda; Mike Crook; Kameron Jackson; Randall Hammers; Akil King	IceNberg; Yung Roda; Mike Crook; Lilbro	2:36
5.	"Put It in My Hand" (with Larry June)	Ke. Jackson; Larry Hendricks III; Denis Raab	DTP	2:27
6.	"Street Love" (with Diamond Platnumz)	Ke. Jackson; Naseeb Issack; Salmin Maengo	S2Kizzy	2:40
7.	"Her Way <3" (with Kalan.FrFr)	Ke. Jackson; Kalan Montgomery; Diego Avendano; Teron Mason; Evan M. White	Diego Ave; All Action; E White	3:19
8.	"It's Givin" (with Ty Dolla Sign)	Ke. Jackson; Tyrone Griffin Jr.; Jasper Harris; Elie Rizk; Isaac De Boni; Michael Mule; Danny Chien; Darhyl Camper Jr.	Jasper Harris; Elie Rizk; FnZ; Wax Motif; Camper	3:05
9.	"Interlude"	Ke. Jackson; Crook	Mike Crook	1:17
Total length:				23:25

Volume 2 track listing
No.	Title	Writer(s)	Producer(s)	Length
10.	"Malibu" (with Tee Grizzley and G Herbo)	Ke. Jackson; Terry Wallace Jr.; Herbert Wright III; Samual Ahana; Charles Forsberg III; Kelton Scott II	Swish; Charley Cooks; Franchisedidit	3:13
11.	"Violence"	Ke. Jackson; Avendano; Ahana; Mason	Diego Ave; Swish; All Action	2:52
12.	"Rescue Me" (with Ty Dolla Sign)	Ke. Jackson; Griffin; Wesley Glass; S. Momberger	Wheezy; Sean Momberger	2:40
13.	"Kolors" (with Mozzy and Ackrite)	Ke. Jackson; Timothy Patterson; Kanacio Martin; Avendano; Wilson Whitlock; Mason	Diego Ave; Whitlock Beats; All Action	2:50
14.	"Love Make"	Ke. Jackson; McFarlane; Myron Avant; Sanders; Steve Huff; Jason Wilkinson; Jeremiah Dickerson	Mustard; Sorry Jaynari; Larry Jayy; Jaywavy	3:34
15.	"Stupid" (with Lil Yachty and Babyface Ray)	Ke. Jackson; Miles McCollum; Marcellus Register; Benjamin Falik; Ka. Jackson; McFarlane; Randy Holmes; Rodney Brown Jr; Michael Nwankwo; Michael Crooms; Solomon Anderson; Warren Mathis	Julia Lewis; Kam Jackson; Mustard; Bandz; Lilbro^{[a]}	2:55
16.	"My Favorite" (with Kalan.FrFr)	Ke. Jackson; Montgomery; Tyler Hooks; Eric Klem; Taylor Banks; Joel Banks	Tyler Hooks; Backnine Z; Bankroll Got It	3:43
17.	"Knocka"	Ke. Jackson; Sanders; Kozlov; Marshall; Juan Maestri; Ruben Lotes; Justinano Orquera	Larry Jayy; KayKay; DJ Vision	2:30
18.	"Pimp My Ride"	Ke. Jackson; Enoch Harris III	Lil Rich	3:23
19.	"I'm in Love"	Ke. Jackson; McFarlane	Mustard	4:02
Total length:				31:46

Notes

- ^{^[a]} signifies a co-producer

== Charts ==
Chart (2024)	Peak position
US Billboard 200	151
