= Sign Language (disambiguation) =

A Sign language is a language that uses the visual-manual modality to convey meaning, instead of spoken words.

Sign Language may also refer to:

- "Sign Language", a song by Jay Chou from the 2012 album Opus 12
- "Sign Language", a 2016 single by Scottish group Vistas
- "Sign Language", a 2021 single by YG
- Sign Language, 2009 album by Blueprint

== See also ==
- List of sign languages
