= Kalan.FrFr =

American singer and rapper

- Born: Kalan Emani Montgomery; April 11, 1995 (age 31); Los Angeles County, California, U.S.
- Origin: Los Angeles, California, U.S.
- Genres: Pop rap; West Coast hip hop; R&B
- Occupations: Rapper; singer; songwriter
- Instrument: Vocals
- Years active: 2018–present
- Labels: Roc Nation; First Class Lifestyle
- Website: www.kalanfrfr.com

Kalan Emani Montgomery (born April 11, 1995), better known by his stage name Kalan.FrFr, is an American singer and rapper. Based in Los Angeles, he has collaborated with several of the city's hip hop and R&B artists, including Kendrick Lamar, Tyga, Mozzy, Dom Kennedy, Ty Dolla Sign, Blxst, and Steve Aoki, among others. He signed with Roc Nation to release his second album Two Frfr (2021), which marked his first entry on the Billboard 200.

== Early life and education ==
Kalan is a native of Southern California and split time with his mother in Carson and his father in Compton. He attended San Diego State University as a scholarship player on the school's college football team, making an appearance in the 2014 Poinsettia Bowl.

== Career ==
Kalan moved to Atlanta, Georgia after college to start his music career. He returned to Los Angeles after a short time and released two EPs, Hurt and TwoFr. In 2019, he collaborated with Casey Veggies on the song "Shake Somethin" for Veggies' 2019 album Organic. He signed to Roc Nation in 2021 and released his debut album TwoFr 2. He also released an expanded version of TwoFr 2 with appearances by Lil Durk, Mozzy, and Stunna 4 Vegas.

In 2021, Kalan was featured in the single and music video "West Like," a collaboration with Destiny Rogers. The also performed the song together during the half-time show of a Los Angeles Clippers game at the Staples Center the same year. Kalan also collaborated for the song "Whole 100" on Mozzy's album Untreated Trauma, which peaked at No. 19 on the US Billboard 200.

Kalan performed at the 2022 Made in America Festival, the same year that he collaborated with DreamDoll on the Kendy X remix of "For Me". He collaborated with K-Ci and Jeremih in 2023 for the song "Stay Part 1," a track from The Love Album: Off the Grid by Sean Combs. He also released Not Hard 2 Understand, a six-track EP. Billboard noted his presence as a surprise guest as a highlight of the Ultra Music Festival in Miami in 2024. Of his 2024 album, Not Hard 2 Understand, AllHipHop.com said that "the charismatic yet laidback storyteller combines a clever mix of punchlines and flexes".

In 19 June 2024, he performed the song "Right Wit It" along with G Perico, for Kendrick Lamar's concert The Pop Out: Ken & Friends at the Kia Forum in Inglewood, California, during the first set by DJ Hed, titled the Act I – DJ Hed & Friends.

== Discography ==
=== Albums and EPs ===
Year	Album	Notes
2018	Hurt	
2018	TwoFr	
2021	TwoFr 2	
2022	222	
2023	Not Hard 2 Understand	
2024	Make the West Great Again	

=== Singles ===
Year	Release	Notes
2024	"Stuck"	With 310babii
2024	"High Vibrations"	
2023	"Butterfly Coupe"	With Tyga
2023	"Butterfly Coupe Part 2"	With Quavo
2022	"No Stoppin"	With Blxst
2021	"West Like"	With Destiny Rogers
2021	"No Love"	With Mozzy
2021	"Scoring"	
2020	"Get In"	With Stunna 4 Vegas
2019	"Time for It" (Remix)	With Azjah, Shordie Shordie
2019	"Switch Sides"	With Steelz, Jonn Hart, Rayven Justice
2019	"Big Bank Take Lil Bank"	With Dan Diego
2019	"Conscious"	With BandzTalk
2018	"Love Song"	
2018	"Wooh"	
2016	"21"	With Rich the Kid
