= Tha Fix Before Tha VI =

2023 mixtape by Lil Wayne

Mixtape by Lil Wayne
- Released: September 29, 2023
- Length: 33:10
- Labels: Young Money; Republic
- Producers: 808-Ray; Bobby Raps; Charlie Handsome; Cool & Dre; FnZ; Julian Munro; Kamo; Manny Galvez; Murda Beatz; Rogét Chahayed; Self B Tru; StreetRunner; Swede; Tarik Azzouz; TheNightAftr; Wheezy; Zachary Foster

Lil Wayne chronology
I Am Music (2023)	Tha Fix Before Tha VI (2023)	Welcome 2 Collegrove (2023)

Singles from Tha Fix Before Tha VI
- 1. "Kat Food" Released: September 1, 2023

Tha Fix Before Tha VI is the seventeenth mixtape by American rapper Lil Wayne, which serves as a prelude to his fourteenth solo studio album Tha Carter VI. The mixtape was released by Young Money Records and Republic Records on September 29, 2023. It consists of 10 tracks, including the single "Kat Food", and features guest appearances from Jon Batiste, Euro, Cool & Dre, and Fousheé.

== Promotion and release ==
The mixtape's first and only single "Kat Food" was released on September 1, 2023. It charted at number 4 on the Bubbling Under Hot 100. On September 20, 2023, he posted a link to pre-save the album on his Instagram and Twitter pages, as well as revealing the cover of the album. The cover is reminiscent of his 2011 mixtape Sorry 4 the Wait. He then revealed the album's track list on September 27, in which he also announced that the album was going to release on September 29, 2023.

== Critical reception ==
Professional ratings
Review scores
Source	Rating
AllMusic	2/5 stars
Clash	5/10
HipHopDX	2.1/5

Tha Fix Before Tha VI received negative reviews from critics.

AllMusic stated that his discography "includes some of the most incredible music to ever grace the rap genre, but if Tha Fix Before Tha VI is any indication of where he's going next, it might usher in the sad realization that the days when Wayne could confidently proclaim himself the "best rapper alive" are behind him."

Robin Murray of Clash said that the album "contains numerous experiments, collaborations, and drafts, indicating his willingness to continually step outside convention – yet it doesn’t always land."

HipHopDX's Alec Siegel said, "It’s impressive that Wayne’s storied recording schedule has evidently remained consistent three decades into his career." But he then called the album "a potent reminder that some music is best kept stashed in the vault"

HotNewHipHop said "Wayne is clearly a gifted rapper, but his songwriting is still inconsistent and the project is tainted by lazy choruses and poor production selection. Let’s hope that Lil Wayne is saving his best material for Tha Carter VI."

== Commercial performance ==
"Tha Fix Before Tha VI" debuted at number 40 on the US Billboard 200 chart, moving 19,000 units.

== Track listing ==
No.	Title	Writer(s)	Producer(s)	Length
1.	"Act Up" (with Jon Batiste)	Dwayne Carter; Jon Batiste; Bennie Briggman; Tarik Azzouz; Nicolas Warwar; Jeremy Maurice Brant; Michael Briggman	STREETRUNNER; Tarik Azzouz	3:39
2.	"Birds"	Carter; Lee Lindstrom; Zachary Foster	Foster; Murda Beatz	2:45
3.	"Slip"	Carter; Mario K Jefferson; Christopher Rios; Darius Ginn Jr; Jermain Anthony Baxter; Khalif Muhammad; David Styles; Kasseem Dean; Jason Phillips; Victor Santiago; Cameron Giles	TheNightAftr; Kamo; Self B Tru	3:31
4.	"Kat Food"	Carter; Chris Stein; Darryl McDaniels; Debbie Harry; FnZ; Jocelyn Donald; Joseph Simmons; Missy Elliott; Paul Simon; Rogét Chahayed; Charlie Handsome	Rogét Chahayed; Charlie Handsome; FnZ	4:47
5.	"Tuxedo" (with Euro)	Carter; Eufradis Rodriguez; Julian Munro; Manny Galvez	Julian Munro; Manny Galvez	3:10
6.	"To The Bank" (with Cool & Dre)	Carter; Rayshon Cobbs Jr; Andre Lyon; Kevin Spencer; Marcello Valenzano; Leon Sylvers	808-Ray; Cool & Dre	2:13
7.	"Chanel No. 5" (with Fousheé)	Carter; Munro; Britanny Foushee; Galvez	Julian Munro; Manny Galvez	3:24
8.	"No New Bitches"	Carter; Wesley Glass; Robert Richardson	Wheezy; Bobby Raps	2:38
9.	"Tity Boi" (with TheNightAftr)	Carter; Jefferson; Ginn Jr	TheNightAftr	5:14
10.	"Good Morning"	Carter; Roberto Curti; Jared Gutstadt; Galvez	Swede; Manny Galvez	1:49
Total length:				33:10

== Charts ==
=== Weekly charts ===
Chart performance for Tha Fix Before Tha VI
Chart (2023)	Peak position
US Billboard 200	40
US Top R&B/Hip-Hop Albums (Billboard)	13
