= Brand New (Tyga, YG and Lil Wayne song) =

2023 single by Tyga, YG and Lil Wayne

Single by Tyga, YG and Lil Wayne

from the album Hit Me When U Leave the Klub: The Playlist
- Released: September 27, 2023
- Genre: Hip hop
- Length: 3:02
- Label: Last Kings; 4Hunnid; Empire
- Songwriters: Micheal Stevenson; Keenon Jackson; Dwayne Carter Jr.; Samuel Ahana; Michael Crook; Diamonté Harper
- Producers: DJ Swish; Mike Crook

Tyga singles chronology
"Soak City" (2023)	"Brand New" (2023)	"Sensei" (2024)

YG singles chronology
"PARTy T1M3" (2023)	"Brand New" (2023)

Lil Wayne singles chronology
"Kat Food" (2023)	"Brand New" (2023)	"Presha" (2023)

Music video
- "Brand New" on YouTube

"Brand New" is a song by American rappers Tyga, YG and Lil Wayne. It was released on September 27, 2023 as the fourth single from the former two's collaborative album Hit Me When U Leave the Klub: The Playlist (2023). The song was produced by DJ Swish and Mike Crook.

== Composition ==
The song opens with an old school jazz rap sound, over which rapper Saweetie talks about the new things she wants, before the beat switches to a modern style. The lyrics of the song revolve around the three artists' lavish lifestyles, including money and women.

== Critical reception ==
Lil Wayne's performance was particularly praised by music critics. Zachary Horvath of HotNewHipHop commented he "brings some clever rhymes" to the song, while Marc Griffin of Vibe stated Wayne had the standout verse on the track and his "clever punchlines give his delivery that classic feel."

== Music video ==
The music video was released alongside the single. Directed by Jack Bridgland, it begins with Saweetie asking for the items she wants. The clip sees the three rappers in a dimly lit warehouse, where each of them perform their verses in different sections of the facility. It also shows women eating lollipops in front of the camera, exotic dancers in a red-tinted room, and men lifting weights in the background.

== Charts ==
Chart performance for "Brand New"
Chart (2023–2024)	Peak position
New Zealand Hot Singles (RMNZ)	24
US Bubbling Under Hot 100 (Billboard)	1
US Hot R&B/Hip-Hop Songs (Billboard)	34
US Rhythmic Airplay (Billboard)	19
