= Kat Food =

2023 single by Lil Wayne

Single by Lil Wayne

from the album Tha Fix Before Tha VI
- Released: September 1, 2023
- Genre: Hip hop
- Length: 4:47
- Label: Young Money; Republic
- Songwriters: Dwayne Carter Jr.; Chris Stein; Darryl McDaniels; Debbie Harry; FnZ; Jocelyn Donald; Joseph Simmons; Missy Elliott; Paul Simon; Rogét Chahayed; Charlie Handsome
- Producers: Rogét Chahayed; Charlie Handsome; FnZ

Lil Wayne singles chronology
"Main One" (2023)	"Kat Food" (2023)	"Brand New" (2023)

Music video
- "Kat Food" on YouTube

"Kat Food" is a song by American rapper Lil Wayne, which was released as a single on September 1, 2023.

== Background and composition ==
The song is based on cunnilingus, which is paired with sexually suggestive lyrics.

Lil Wayne made his return at the MTV Video Music Awards by performing the song on September 12, 2023.

== Charts ==
Chart performance for "Kat Food"
Chart (2023)	Peak position
New Zealand Hot Singles (RMNZ)	22
US Bubbling Under Hot 100 (Billboard)	4
US Hot R&B/Hip-Hop Songs (Billboard)	34
