= Stay Dangerous =

2018 studio album by YG

Studio album by YG
- Released: August 3, 2018
- Genre: Gangsta rap
- Length: 50:21
- Labels: 4Hunnid; Def Jam
- Producers: DJ Mustard; KJ Santana; Mike Will Made It; MP808; TM88

YG chronology
Still Brazy (2016)	Stay Dangerous (2018)	4Real 4Real (2019)

Singles from Stay Dangerous
- 1. "Suu Whoop" Released: February 16, 2018; 2. "Big Bank" Released: May 25, 2018

Stay Dangerous (stylised in all caps) is the third studio album by American rapper YG. It was released on August 3, 2018, by 4Hunnid Records and Def Jam Recordings. The album features guest appearances from various rappers, including 2 Chainz, ASAP Rocky, Ty Dolla Sign, Quavo, Mozzy, Jay 305, Big Sean, YoungBoy Never Broke Again and Nicki Minaj.

Stay Dangerous was supported by two singles: "Suu Whoop" and "Big Bank". The album received generally positive reviews from critics and debuted at number five on the US Billboard 200.

== Promotion ==
On August 2, 2018, YG released a trailer for the album, inspired by Dos Equis's The Most Interesting Man in the World ad campaign.

== Singles ==
The album's lead single, "Suu Whoop", was released for streaming and digital download on February 16, 2018. Its music video was released on March 13, 2018.

The album's second single, "Big Bank" featuring 2 Chainz, Big Sean and Nicki Minaj, was released on May 25, 2018. Its music video was released a month later. It peaked at number 16 on the US Billboard Hot 100 and was certified four-times platinum by the Recording Industry Association of America (RIAA).

=== Promotional singles ===
The lead promotional single, "Handgun" featuring ASAP Rocky, was released on July 26, 2018, alongside its music video.

== Critical reception ==
Professional ratings
Aggregate scores
Source	Rating
AnyDecentMusic?	6.5/10
Metacritic	71/100
Review scores
Source	Rating
AllMusic	3/5 stars
The A.V. Club	B
Entertainment Weekly	B+
The Guardian	3/5 stars
HipHopDX	3.2/5
Pitchfork	6.5/10
PopMatters	6/10
Rolling Stone	3.5/5 stars
Slant Magazine	3/5 stars
XXL	3/5

Stay Dangerous was met with generally positive reviews. At Metacritic, which assigns a normalized rating out of 100 to reviews from mainstream publications, the album received an average score of 71, based on 16 reviews. Aggregator AnyDecentMusic? gave it 6.5 out of 10, based on their assessment of the critical consensus.

Isaac Feldberg of Entertainment Weekly praised the album saying, "YG's objectives across Stay Dangerous are more narrow and (for him) natural. Reuniting with long-time producer DJ Mustard for around half the album, YG is largely content to low-ride in his lane, swaggering across Bloods-allegiant bangers (electrifying "Suu Whoop") and incisive tell-alls from the hood ("Too Brazy" "Deeper Than Rap")." Jack Riedy of Consequence of Sound said, "Though it doesn't quite reach the heights of his first two, his new album, Stay Dangerous, is another solid project from one of the best on the West Coast." Clayton Purdom of The A.V. Club gave the album a positive review stating, "It pretty much all works, in the way that all of YG's music works, anchored by superlative taste and a flow as versatile and reliable as T.I. in his prime." Meaghan Garvey of Rolling Stone wrote: "Mustard's beats here don't exactly reinvent the wheel, but they serve as hydraulics to YG's low-riding delivery; on "Too Cocky", the producer's minimalist West Coast bounce pairs perfectly with YG's unexpected and inspired Right Said Fred interpolation." Jackson Howard of Pitchfork saying "For YG, an artist we've come to expect the unexpected from, someone currently standing at a career-defining intersection, Stay Dangerous is an exercise in predictability."

In a mixed review, XXL's Chris Gibbons stated: "Stay Dangerous doesn't quite feel like the grand statement of Still Brazy or My Krazy Life. It's a slight step back from a rapper who is capable of much greater. While the brief glimpses of his personal life aren't quite enough to elevate the project, it's worthwhile to hear him breezing over Mustard beats once again." In another mixed review, The Guardian's Rachel Aroesti stated: "YG doesn't cover his subject matter with a huge amount of wit or creativity. Yet the rapper makes up for lyrical dullness with a sound that can be tantalising." Zachary Hoskins of Slant Magazine said, "The rigid codes of masculinity governing hardcore rap, though, keep YG's lyrics from showing as much range as Mustard's beats."

== Commercial performance ==
In YG's home country of United States, Stay Dangerous debuted at number five on the US Billboard 200 earning 56,000 album-equivalent units, which included 11,000 pure album sales in its first week. It serves as YG's third consecutive top-ten album on the chart. In its second week, the album dropped to number 13 on the chart, earning an additional 23,000 units. On April 10, 2019, the album was certified gold by the Recording Industry Association of America (RIAA) for combined sales and album-equivalent units of over 500,000 units in the United States.

In Australia, the album opened at number 15 on the ARIA Albums Chart, becoming YG's first top 20 album on the country. In Canada, Stay Dangerous debuted at number nine on the Canadian Albums Chart. It serves as YG's second non-consecutive top-ten album in the country.

== Track listing ==
Credits adapted from Tidal.

Stay Dangerous track listing
No.	Title	Writer(s)	Producer(s)	Length
1.	"10 Times"	Keenon Jackson; Dijon McFarlane	DJ Mustard	2:38
2.	"Bulletproof" (featuring Jay 305)	Jackson; Keith Stinson; Jay Cummins	KJ Santana	2:33
3.	"Handgun" (featuring ASAP Rocky)	Jackson; Bryan Simmons; Terrell McNeal; Rakim Mayers	TM88; MP808	3:34
4.	"Suu Whoop"	Jackson; McFarlane; Jordan Holt	DJ Mustard; Holt^{[a]}	3:04
5.	"Cant Get in Kanada"	Jackson; McFarlane; Leslie Wakefield Jr.	DJ Mustard; Official^{[a]}	2:21
6.	"Too Cocky"	Jackson; McFarlane; Christopher Fairbrass; Richard Fairbrass; Robert Manzoli	DJ Mustard	2:52
7.	"Big Bank" (featuring 2 Chainz, Big Sean and Nicki Minaj)	Jackson; McFarlane; Nye Lee Jr.; Tauheed Epps; Sean Anderson; Onika Maraj	DJ Mustard	3:57
8.	"Power" (featuring Ty Dolla Sign)	Jackson; McFarlane; Ruben Sosa; Tyrone Griffin Jr.	DJ Mustard; Citoonthebeat^{[a]}	2:52
9.	"Slay" (featuring Quavo)	Jackson; McFarlane; Quavious Marshall; Willie Hutch	DJ Mustard	4:44
10.	"666" (featuring YoungBoy Never Broke Again)	Jackson; Michael Williams; Peyton Landers; Kentrell Gaulden; Craig Lawson; Bobby Sandimanie; Jonathan Smith; Michael Tyler	Mike Will Made It; Ziti^{[a]}	4:39
11.	"Too Brazy" (featuring Mozzy)	Jackson; McFarlane; Sosa; Timothy Patterson	DJ Mustard; Citoonthebeat^{[a]}	3:30
12.	"Pussy Money Fame"	Jackson; Enoch Harris	Lil Rich	2:58
13.	"Deeper Than Rap"	Jackson; Harris	Lil Rich	3:22
14.	"Free the Homies Interlude"	Marlon Williams; McFarlane	DJ Mustard	1:53
15.	"Bomptown Finest"	Jackson; McFarlane	DJ Mustard	5:23
Total length:				50:21

Notes

- ^{^[a]} signifies a co-producer
- "Handgun" is known as "Band Drum" on the clean version of the album
- "Bulletproof" features background vocals by Carter Kim
- "Handgun" and "666" features additional vocals by Albert Thompson
- "Free the Homies Interlude" features voice by Leandre Herman

Sample credits

- "Too Cocky" contains an interpolation from "I'm Too Sexy", written by Christopher Fairbrass, Richard Fairbrass, and Robert Manzoli, and performed by Right Said Fred.

== Personnel ==
Credits adapted from Tidal.

Musicians

- DJ Mustard – guitar (track 14)
- Marlon Williams – guitar (track 14)
- Richard "Hymnbeats" Antione – additional keyboards (track 14)

Technical

- Dee Brown – recording (tracks 1, 2, 5–8, 10–13, 15)
- David Pizzimenti – recording (tracks 3, 4)
- Nolan Presley – recording (track 7)
- Gregg Rominiecki – recording (track 7)
- Cyrus Taghipour – recording (track 9)
- Mark Dorflinger – recording (track 10)
- DJ Mustard – recording (track 14)
- Derek "MixedbyAli" Ali – mixing (tracks 2–5, 8–11, 15)
- Michael "MikFly" Dottin – mixing (tracks 1–3, 6–13), recording (track 15)
- Finis "KY" White – vocal mixing (track 7)

== Charts ==
=== Weekly charts ===
Chart performance for Stay Dangerous
Chart (2018)	Peak position
Australian Albums (ARIA)	15
Canadian Albums (Billboard)	9
Dutch Albums (Album Top 100)	71
New Zealand Albums (RMNZ)	21
Swiss Albums (Schweizer Hitparade)	54
US Billboard 200	5
US Top R&B/Hip-Hop Albums (Billboard)	5

=== Year-end charts ===
2018 year-end chart performance for Stay Dangerous
Chart (2018)	Position
US Billboard 200	173
US Top R&B/Hip-Hop Albums (Billboard)	63

== Certifications ==
Certifications for Stay Dangerous
Region	Certification	Certified units/sales
United States (RIAA)	Gold	500,000^{‡}
^{‡} Sales+streaming figures based on certification alone.

== Release history ==
Release dates and formats for Stay Dangerous
Region	Date	Label(s)	Format(s)	Ref.
Various	August 3, 2018	4Hunnid; Def Jam	Digital download; streaming	
Various	August 31, 2018	4Hunnid; Def Jam	CD	
Various	November 9, 2018	4Hunnid; Def Jam	Vinyl	
