= Untreated Trauma =

Studio album by Mozzy
- Released: September 17, 2021
- Genre: Hip hop
- Length: 27:45
- Label: Mozzy Reccords; EMPIRE

Mozzy chronology
Kommunity Service (2021)	Untreated Trauma (2021)	Survivor’s Guilt (2022)

Professional ratings
Review scores
Source	Rating
AllMusic	3.5/5 stars
HipHopDX	3.7/5

Untreated Trauma is the sixth studio album by American rapper Mozzy. It was released on September 17, 2021 via Mozzy Records/EMPIRE. It features guest appearances from Babyface Ray, Celly Ru, E Mozzy, EST Gee, Kalan.FrFr and YFN Lucci. The album peaked at number 19 on the US Billboard 200 chart.

== Commercial performance ==
In the week of October 2, 2021, Untreated Trauma debuted at number 19 on the Billboard 200 with 19,500 album-equivalent units (including 10,500 in pure album sales), making it the best-selling R&B/hip-hop album for that week. The album also accumulated 11.5 million on-demand streams that same week.

Untreated Trauma also debuted at number 10 on the Top R&B/Hip-Hop Albums chart and at number 9 on the Top Rap Albums, becoming Mozzy's first and second top-10 album on both charts respectively and his sixth entry overall on both charts.

== Track listing ==
No.	Title	Length
1.	"Straight to 4th"	2:51
2.	"Beat the Case" (featuring EST Gee and Babyface Ray)	3:15
3.	"Tycoon"	2:09
4.	"My Life Different"	2:40
5.	"Reeboks" (featuring E Mozzy)	2:40
6.	"Whole 100" (featuring Kalan.FrFr)	2:40
7.	"Slimey"	2:40
8.	"Let You Know" (featuring YFN Lucci)	2:31
9.	"Step Brothers" (featuring Celly Ru)	2:17
10.	"Again & Again"	3:02
Total length:		27:45

== Charts ==
Chart (2021)	Peak position
US Billboard 200	19
US Top R&B/Hip-Hop Albums (Billboard)	10
US Top Rap Albums (Billboard)	9
US Independent Albums (Billboard)	3
