= Big Bank =

Single by YG featuring 2 Chainz, Big Sean and Nicki Minaj

from the album Stay Dangerous
- Released: May 25, 2018
- Genre: Hip hop; hyphy
- Length: 3:58
- Label: 4Hunnid; CTE World; Def Jam
- Songwriters: Sean Anderson; Keenon Jackson; Onika Maraj; Nye Lee Jr.; Dijon McFarlane; Tauheed Epps
- Producer: DJ Mustard

YG singles chronology
"4 Days" (2018)	"Big Bank" (2018)	"Dangerous World" (2018)

2 Chainz singles chronology
"Accelerate" (2018)	"Big Bank" (2018)	"Bigger Than You" (2018)

Big Sean singles chronology
"Alone" (2018)	"Big Bank" (2018)	"Overtime" (2019)

Nicki Minaj singles chronology
"Ball for Me" (2018)	"Big Bank" (2018)	"Bed" (2018)

Music video
- "Big Bank" on YouTube

"Big Bank" (stylised in all caps) is a song by the American rapper YG featuring 2 Chainz, Big Sean and Nicki Minaj. Produced by DJ Mustard, it was released on May 25, 2018, as the second single from YG's third studio album, Stay Dangerous (2018).

== Chart performance ==
Big Bank debuted at number 66 on the US Billboard Hot 100 on the chart dated June 9, 2018. After climbing the charts for weeks, the song eventually reached its peak position at number 16 on the chart dated August 18, 2018, becoming YG's highest-charting song as a lead artist. On September 10, 2020, the single was certified quadruple platinum by the Recording Industry Association of America (RIAA) for combined sales and streaming equivalent units of over four million units in the United States.

== Madden NFL 19 controversy ==
The song is featured on the soundtrack of the 2018 video game Madden NFL 19. Prior to its release, it was revealed Electronic Arts had removed quarterback Colin Kaepernick's name from the song, which led to outcry on social media. Big Sean, who raps the verse, called the action "disappointing and appalling". EA responded to the criticism by saying:

"We made an unfortunate mistake with our Madden NFL soundtrack. Members of our team misunderstood the fact that while we don’t have rights to include Colin Kaepernick in the game, this doesn't affect soundtracks. We messed up, and the edit should never have happened. We will make it right, with an update to Madden NFL 19 on August 6 that will include the reference again. We meant no disrespect, and we apologize to Colin, to YG and Big Sean, to the NFL, to all of their fans and our players for this mistake."

== Music video ==
The music video for "Big Bank" premiered via YG's Vevo channel on June 23, 2018.

== Live performances ==
YG performed the song at the BET Awards alongside 2 Chainz, Big Sean and Nicki Minaj on June 24, 2018.

== Charts ==
=== Weekly charts ===
Chart (2018)	Peak position
Canada Hot 100 (Billboard)	51
New Zealand (Recorded Music NZ)	29
US Billboard Hot 100	16
US Hot R&B/Hip-Hop Songs (Billboard)	13
US Rhythmic Airplay (Billboard)	1

=== Year-end charts ===
Chart (2018)	Position
US Billboard Hot 100	63
US Hot R&B/Hip-Hop Songs (Billboard)	35
US Rhythmic (Billboard)	14

== Certifications ==
Region	Certification	Certified units/sales
Canada (Music Canada)	Gold	40,000^{‡}
New Zealand (RMNZ)	Platinum	30,000^{‡}
United States (RIAA)	5× Platinum	5,000,000^{‡}
^{‡} Sales+streaming figures based on certification alone.

== Release history ==
Region	Date	Format	Label	Ref.
Various	May 25, 2018	Digital download	4Hunnid; CTE World; Def Jam	
United States	July 12, 2018	Urban contemporary radio	Def Jam	
United States	September 25, 2018	Contemporary hit radio	Def Jam	
