= Hit Me When U Leave the Klub: The Playlist =

Studio album by Tyga and YG
- Released: September 29, 2023
- Genre: West Coast hip-hop
- Length: 37:29
- Labels: Last Kings; 4Hunnid; EMPIRE
- Producers: Bizness Boi; Bone Collector; DTP; Gotdamnitdupri; IceNberg; LarryJayy; Man Man; Mike Crook; QuakeBeatz; Ryan OG; Sean Momberger; Swish; Xplosive Beats

YG chronology
I Got Issues (2022)	Hit Me When U Leave the Klub: The Playlist (2023)	Just Re'd Up 3 (2024)

Tyga chronology
Legendary (2019)	Hit Me When U Leave the Klub: The Playlist (2023)	NSFW (2025)

Singles from Hit Me When U Leave the Klub: The Playlist
- 1. "West Coast Weekend" Released: June 8, 2023; 2. "Platinum" Released: June 16, 2023; 3. "Party T1m3" Released: August 25, 2023; 4. "Brand New" Released: September 29, 2023

Hit Me When U Leave the Klub: The Playlist is a collaborative album by American rappers Tyga and YG, released on September 29, 2023, by Last Kings, 4Hunnid, and Empire. The album contains guest appearances from Lil Wayne, Busta Rhymes, and Blxst. It was supported by four singles: "West Coast Weekend", "Platinum", "Party T1me", and "Brand New".

== Background and promotion ==
The album was announced during Tyga and YG's set at the Rolling Loud music festival in March 2023. The album has been described as a "compilation of California club bangers".

The album was planned to have a supporting tour, named the "Str8 to the Klub Tour", with Saweetie serving as a supporting act. However, it was cancelled due to poor ticket sales.

== Critical reception ==
Professional ratings
Review scores
Source	Rating
AllMusic	3/5 stars

AllMusic gave the album a generally mixed assessment, describing the rappers' performances as "irreverent" and noting that the quality of their wordplay varied considerably. The publication nevertheless praised the record's "lean" production and named tracks such as "Choose Up" and "West Coast Weekend" as examples of the duo successfully adapting their style to smoother R&B-influenced material.

Aaron Williams of Uproxx was more positive, arguing that the album succeeded because both performers understood their respective strengths rather than attempting to radically reinvent themselves. Williams described the collaboration as an effective example of a joint rap project and praised the artists for concentrating on their established styles.

== Track listing ==
Credits adapted from Tidal.

Hit Me When U Leave the Klub: The Playlist track listing
No.	Title	Writer(s)	Producer(s)	Length
1.	"Rubber Band Man"	Micheal Ray Nguyen-Stevenson; Keenon Dequan Ray Jackson	IceNberg; LarryJayy	2:32
2.	"Brand New" (with Lil Wayne)	Stevenson; Jackson; Dwayne Michael Carter Jr.; Diamonté Quiava Valentin Harper	Swish; Mike Crook	3:02
3.	"Thumpin"	Stevenson; Jackson	Gotdamnitdupri	2:41
4.	"Get Me Litt"	Stevenson; Jackson; Destin Choice Route	Bizness Boi; Sean Momberger	2:14
5.	"Perk 10"	Stevenson; Jackson	QuakeBeatz	2:31
6.	"Time for That"	Stevenson; Jackson	Swish; Mike Crook	2:49
7.	"Choose Up"	Stevenson; Jackson	Gotdamnitdupri; Man Man	2:23
8.	"Big One" (with Busta Rhymes)	Stevenson; Jackson; Trevor George Smith Jr.	Swish	3:24
9.	"I'm tha Reason"	Stevenson; Jackson	Swish; Man Man	2:36
10.	"West Coast Weekend" (with Blxst)	Stevenson; Jackson; Matthew Dean Burdette	Swish; Mike Crook; Ryan OG	3:19
11.	"Party T1m3"	Stevenson; Jackson	Bone Collector; Xplosive Beats	2:34
12.	"Boachella"	Stevenson; Jackson	IceNberg; LarryJayy; Man Man; Bone Collector; Xplosive Beats	2:18
13.	"Platinum"	Stevenson; Jackson	DTP; Man Man; Bone Collector; Xplosive Beats	2:38
14.	"FWU"	Stevenson; Jackson	DTP; Man Man	2:21
Total length:				37:29

Notes

- "Party T1m3" is stylized as "PARTy T1M3".
- "Platinum" is stylized in all caps.

Sample credits

- "West Coast Weekend" contains samples of "All About You", written by Tupac Shakur, Johnny Jackson, Calvin Broadus, Larry Blackmon, Yafeu Fula, Bruce Washington, Thomas Jenkins, and Nathaniel Hale, as performed by 2Pac.

== Charts ==
Chart performance for Hit Me When U Leave the Klub: The Playlist
Chart (2023)	Peak position
US Billboard 200	101
US Top R&B/Hip-Hop Albums (Billboard)	44
