= Toot It and Boot It =

2010 debut single by YG

Single by YG

from the album The Real 4Fingaz
- Released: June 8, 2010
- Recorded: 2009
- Genre: Dirty rap; hyphy; trap
- Length: 4:03
- Label: Pu$haz Ink; Def Jam
- Songwriters: Keenon Jackson; Tyrone Griffin; Ted Bluechel; Nye Lee; Marquise Newman
- Producers: Chordz; Ty Dolla Sign; G Ca$$o

YG singles chronology
"Toot It and Boot It" (2010)	"Function" (2012)

Music video
- ”Toot It and Boot It” on YouTube

"Toot It and Boot It" is the debut single by American rapper YG featuring uncredited vocals from American singer Ty Dolla Sign, taken from the former's second mixtape, The Real 4Fingaz (2010). The song was officially released on June 8, 2010, by Def Jam Recordings. The song peaked at number 67 on the US Billboard Hot 100 and number 12 on the US Hot Rap Songs chart. An official remix along with its music video was released, featuring additional appearances from fellow American rappers 50 Cent and Snoop Dogg. The song features samples of "Songs In the Wind" by The Association, part of their 1966 album Renaissance. The track was later sampled on "Young, Wild & Free" by Snoop Dogg and Wiz Khalifa (featuring Bruno Mars).

== Charts ==
=== Weekly charts ===
Chart (2010–2011)	Peak position
US Billboard Hot 100	67
US Hot R&B/Hip-Hop Songs (Billboard)	60
US Hot Rap Songs (Billboard)	12
US Rhythmic Airplay (Billboard)	12

=== Year-end charts ===
Chart (2010)	Position
US Rhythmic (Billboard)	49

== Certifications ==
Region	Certification	Certified units/sales
United States (RIAA)	Platinum	1,000,000^{‡}
^{‡} Sales+streaming figures based on certification alone.
