= Kommunity Service =

Studio album by YG and Mozzy
- Released: May 21, 2021
- Genre: West Coast hip hop
- Length: 28:31
- Label: 4Hunnid; EMPIRE
- Producer: Ambezza; BankrollGotIt; BGrand; Cubeatz; DaveO; Dez Wright; Diego Ave; Drum Dummie; Jay P Bangz; Larry Jay; Musik MajorX; Paul Cabbin; Swish; Tariq Beats; T-Lew

YG chronology
My Life 4Hunnid (2020)	Kommunity Service (2021)	I Got Issues (2022)

Mozzy chronology
Occupational Hazard (2020)	Kommunity Service (2021)	Untreated Trauma (2021)

Singles from Kommunity Service
- 1. "Bompton to Oak Park" Released: April 22, 2021; 2. "Perfect Timing" Released: May 3, 2021

Kommunity Service is a collaborative studio album by American rappers YG and Mozzy. It was released on May 21, 2021, by Mozzy Records, 4Hunnid Records, and Empire Distribution. Production was handled by several record producers, including Dave-O, Tariq Beats, Jay P Bangz, Swish, and Cubeatz. It features guest appearances from A Boogie wit da Hoodie, Blxst, Celly Ru, D3szn, E Mozzy, G Herbo, Ty Dolla $ign, Tyga, and Young M.A. The album peaked at number 88 on the Billboard 200 and number 44 on the Top R&B/Hip-Hop Albums in the United States.

== Background ==
The project was announced under the initial title Perfect Timing on May 3, 2021, alongside the release of what would have been the album's title track. The single followed the release of the album's lead single "Bompton to Oak Park" on April 22, 2021. Later, on May 18, 2021, the rappers announced the project's release date under the new title Kommunity Service, along with its track listing and cover art. The artwork is a tribute to the cult classic film Belly and the late rapper DMX, showing YG and Mozzy in all-white suits and red bandana-print ties. In a press release, YG stated that the project is "strictly for the streets." Mozzy added that they're "just doing [their] 'Kommunity Service'. West Coast been closed, so it's time to turn it back up."

== Critical reception ==
Professional ratings
Aggregate scores
Source	Rating
Metacritic	75/100
Review scores
Source	Rating
AllMusic	3.5/5 stars
Exclaim!	8/10
HipHopDX	4/5
Pitchfork	6.6/10

Kommunity Service was met with generally favorable reviews from critics. At Metacritic, which assigns a weighted average rating out of 100 to reviews from mainstream publications, this release received an average score of 75, based on four reviews.

Wesley McLean of Exclaim! wrote that the album "manages to deliver on almost every front. It's an impressive collaborative effort from two of California's brightest stars, yet another solid release in Mozzy's rapidly expanding catalogue and a much-needed return to form for YG following a few subpar releases". Ben Brutocao of HipHopDX wrote: "Mozzy’s strengths are YG’s weaknesses and vice-versa, which is the making of an ideal collaboration. There is an iron-clad authenticity to every note and word on the album: It’s rap that makes you start doing pushups, rap that you’ll most likely hear in the next Fast and Furious movie, and most importantly, rap that you’ll remember for longer than a few weeks". AllMusic's Fred Thomas resumed "although Kommunity Service is short, it still shows versatility by approaching various styles track to track". Paul A. Thompson of Pitchfork wrote: "while Kommunity Service only hints at what a true synthesis of those artists could be, at times the implication is enough".

== Track listing ==
No.	Title	Writer(s)	Producer(s)	Length
1.	"Gangsta"	Keenon Jackson; Timothy Patterson	BGrand; Dave-O; Musik MajorX; Tariq Beats	2:24
2.	"Dangerous" (featuring G Herbo)	Jackson; Patterson; Herbert Randall Wright III	Bankrollgotit; Diego Ave; Swish	2:11
3.	"Bompton to Oak Park"	Jackson; Patterson	Dave-O; Jay P Bangz	2:44
4.	"MAD" (featuring Young M.A)	Jackson; Patterson; Katorah Marrero	Ambezza; Cubeatz; Swish	2:58
5.	"Vibe with You" (featuring Ty Dolla $ign)	Jackson; Patterson; Tyrone William Griffin Jr.; Kalan Montgomery; Kelsie Smith; Rayven Justice	Dave-O; Paul Cabbin; Tariq Beats	3:08
6.	"Drop a Location" (featuring A Boogie Wit Da Hoodie)	Jackson; Patterson; Artist Julius Dubose	Dez Wright; Tariq Beats	2:14
7.	"Toot It Up" (featuring Tyga)	Jackson; Patterson; Micheal Ray Nguyen-Stevenson	Larry Jay	3:26
8.	"First 48" (featuring E Mozzy, Celly Ru and D3szn)	Jackson; Patterson; Eric Cry; Marcel Young; Glenstine Rodney	T-Lew	3:17
9.	"Bite Down"	Jackson; Patterson	Drum dummie	2:49
10.	"Perfect Timing" (featuring Blxst)	Jackson; Patterson; Matthew Burdette	Dave-O; Jay P Bangz	3:16
Total length:				28:31

== Charts ==
Chart (2021)	Peak position
US Billboard 200	88
US Top R&B/Hip-Hop Albums (Billboard)	44
US Independent Albums (Billboard)	9
