= My Life 4Hunnid =

Studio album by YG
- Released: October 2, 2020
- Genre: Hip-hop; West Coast hip-hop
- Length: 32:31
- Label: 4Hunnid; Def Jam
- Producer: Scoop DeVille; Benjamin Lasnier; Bouvé; Chris Payton; Diego Ave; DJ Swish; Franchise; Go Grizzly; Iceberg; Kyle Junior; Larry June; Lethal; Lil Rich; Mike Crook; Musik MajorX; Nas Moore; Pasqué; Paul Cabbin; Psymun; Quintin Gulledge; Rance; Sool Got Hits; Tariq Beats; Verrsaucy

YG chronology
4Real 4Real (2019)	My Life 4Hunnid (2020)	Kommunity Service (2021)

Singles from My Life 4Hunnid
- 1. "Laugh Now Kry Later!" Released: May 1, 2020; 2. "FTP" Released: June 2, 2020; 3. "Swag" Released: July 10, 2020; 4. "Out on Bail" Released: September 23, 2020

Professional ratings
Review scores
Source	Rating
AllMusic	3.5/5 stars

My Life 4Hunnid is the fifth studio album by American rapper YG, released on October 2, 2020, by 4Hunnid Records and Def Jam Recordings. The album features guest appearances from D3szn, Lil Wayne, Chris Brown, Tyga, Lil Tjay, Tay2xs, Gunna, Ty Dolla Sign, Calboy, and Lil Mosey.

== Background ==
The title is a reference to the 400 block of West Spruce Street in Compton, CA, where he grew up.

On the album's cover art, YG is wearing a red shirt with the album's title written all over it and a red light is shining on his body. This is due to the fact that the rapper is closely associated with the Bloods street gang, in which they wear the color red.

== Singles ==
YG released the album's lead single, "Laugh Now Kry Later!", on May 1, 2020, alongside the official music video. The album's original title was supposed to be the same name as the single. The second single, "FTP", which stands for "Fuck the Police", a protest single supporting the protests related to the Black Lives Matter movement, was released on June 2, 2020, in coincidence with Blackout Tuesday.

== Commercial performance ==
In the United States, My Life 4Hunnid debuted at number four on the US Billboard 200 with 64,000 album-equivalent units, which included 40,000 pure album sales (a majority of which were paired with bundles from his 4 Hunnid clothing line).

== Track listing ==
Credits adapted from Tidal.

No.	Title	Writer(s)	Producer(s)	Length
1.	"Jealous"	Keenon Jackson; Paul Cabbin; Altariq Crapps; Timothy Wells, Jr.; Quinton Cook	Tariq Beats; Musik MajorX	2:31
2.	"Blood Walk" (with D3szn featuring Lil Wayne)	Jackson; Glenstine Rodney; Dwayne Carter, Jr.; Michael Crook; Jason Herrera; Joseph Meija; Karen Civil	Mike Crook; Verrsaucy; Lethal	2:40
3.	"Traumatized Interlude"			0:09
4.	"Out On Bail"	Jackson; Harrison Bouvé; Enoch Harris	Bouvé; Lil Rich	2:19
5.	"Rodeo" (featuring Chris Brown and Tyga)	Jackson; Christopher Brown; Michael Stevenson; E. Molina; Bruce Fisher; Christopher Wong Won; Michael Ross; David Hobbs; Stanley Richardson; Quincy Jones; Leon Ware; Luther Campbell; Stanley Richardson	Scoop DeVille	3:01
6.	"Swag"	Jackson; Benjamin Lasnier; Quintin Gulledge; Ahana	Lasnier; Gulledge; Swish	2:31
7.	"Hate on Me" (featuring Lil Tjay)	Jackson; Tione Merritt; Kevin Price; Nasir Moore; Rasool Diaz	Go Grizzly; Nas Moore; Rasool Diaz	2:45
8.	"War Scars" (with Tay2xs)	Jackson; De’Tayvion Webb; Tung Vu Hong	Kyle Junior	3:23
9.	"Surgery" (with Gunna featuring Ty Dolla Sign)	Jackson; Sergio Kitchens; Tyrone Griffin, Jr.; Dylan Berg; Irvin Mejia; Kelton Scott II	Iceberg; Pasqué; Franchise	3:36
10.	"Thug Kry" (featuring Calboy and Lil Mosey)	Jackson; Calvin Woods; Lathan Echols; Ahana; Diego Avendano	Swish; Diego Ave	3:33
11.	"Traumatized Interlude #2"			0:11
12.	"FTP"	Jackson; Ahana; Larry Sanders	Swish; Larry Jayy	2:40
13.	"Laugh Now Kry Later!"	Jackson; Berg; Mejia; Scott	Iceberg; Pasqué; Franchise	2:55
Total length:				30:24

Notes

- ^{^[a]} signifies a co-producer
- "Swag" is stylized in all caps

== Charts ==
Chart (2020)	Peak position
Australian Albums (ARIA)	56
Canadian Albums (Billboard)	35
US Billboard 200	4
US Top R&B/Hip-Hop Albums (Billboard)	3
