= Beyond Bulletproof =

Studio album by Mozzy
- Released: May 1, 2020
- Genre: Hip hop
- Length: 41:42
- Labels: Mozzy Records; Empire
- Producers: Jay P. Bangz; Musik MajorX; Tariq Beats; Drum Dummie; Greg Sekeres; India Got Them Beats; JabariOnTheBeat; James Maddocks; Jared Scharff; L Finguz; Manu; MMMonthebeat; Mook Got The Keys Jumpin; Seph Got The Waves; TNTXD; Yung Lan

Mozzy chronology
Blood Cuzzins (2019)	Beyond Bulletproof (2020)	Occupational Hazard (2020)

Singles from Beyond Bulletproof
- 1. "Big Homie From The Hood" Released: December 12, 2019; 2. "Overcame" Released: January 14, 2020; 3. "I Ain't Perfect" Released: March 26, 2020; 4. "Pricetag" Released: April 8, 2020; 5. "Boyz to Men" Released: April 21, 2020

Beyond Bulletproof is the fifth studio album by American rapper Mozzy from Sacramento, California. It was released on May 1, 2020, via Mozzy Records and Empire Distribution. Production was handled by sixteen record producers, including Jay P Bangz, Musik MajorX, Tariq Beats, TNTXD, and Yung Lan. It features guest appearances from Blxst, Celly Ru, E Mozzy, Eric Bellinger, G Herbo, King Von, Lil Poppa, Polo G, and Shordie Shordie. The album peaked at number 43 on the Billboard 200.

The album was supported by several singles, including "Big Homie from the Hood," "Overcame," "I Ain't Perfect," "Pricetag," and "Boyz to Men."

== Background ==
In an interview, Mozzy explained the meaning of the title stating:

In my neighborhood and the ghettos of America, 'bulletproof' means 'love.' So this is a message that nobody can tamper with. The love that I've got for you, it’s bulletproof – it's Teflon. We seasoned up the expression, I'm taking it further and saying that I love you regardless of your flaws or the rules of the street.

== Singles ==
The album's lead single, "Big Homie from the Hood" was released, along with its music video on December 12, 2019. It samples the 2004 single, "Let Me Love You" by American singer Mario.

On January 14, 2020, Mozzy released the albums second single, "Overcame", along with a music video, which was directed by David Camarena.

The album's third single, "I Ain't Perfect" featuring Blxst was released on March 26, 2020.

The fourth single, "Pricetag" featuring Polo G and Lil Poppa, was released along with a music video on April 8, 2020.

On April 21, 2020, Mozzy released the album's fifth and final single "Boyz to Men". The single's music video was released the same day.

== Critical reception ==
Professional ratings
Aggregate scores
Source	Rating
Metacritic	77/100
Review scores
Source	Rating
AllMusic	3.5/5 stars
HipHopDX	3.9/5
Pitchfork	7.3/10
RapReviews	8/10

Beyond Bulletproof was met with generally favorable reviews from critics. At Metacritic, which assigns a weighted average rating out of 100 to reviews from mainstream publications, this release received an average score of 77, based on four reviews.

RapReviews.com critic Ryan Feyre said, "Mozzy's greatest strength as a writer is clear intimacy. Every time he spits a verse, I feel like he's talking to me one-on-one with a cigar in hand and his posse surrounding him. There's wisdom attached to his words because he's been through it all. ... Mozzy still carries demons, but there are indeed shimmers of happiness percolating throughout some of these passages". Kenan Draughorne of HipHopDX said, "He doesn't dazzle with sinewy flows or clever melodies; he spits what's on his mind and trusts it will resonate. It definitely resonates on Beyond Bulletproof, due to his transparent lens and well-suited production. Chalk it up as a victory for Sacramento's lyrical champion". Sheldon Pearce of Pitchfork summed up, "Beyond Bulletproof is the closest Mozzy has come to making his songs accessible". AllMusic's Fred Thomas said, "Lyrical themes orbit around topics he often returns to: crime, struggle, and street vengeance. With Beyond Bulletproof, however, the delivery is shades more relaxed and even introspective, allowing for a clearer view of Mozzy's pain as well as his personality".

== Track listing ==
No.	Title	Producer(s)	Length
1.	"Unethical & Deceitful"	Jay P Bangz	2:14
2.	"So Lonely" (featuring Shordie Shordie)	Yung Lan; James Maddocks; Greg Sekeres	3:24
3.	"Body Count" (featuring G Herbo and King Von)	Manu	4:04
4.	"Betrayed"	MMMonthebeat	3:02
5.	"Bulletproofly"	TNTXD	3:21
6.	"Boyz to Men"	Jay P Bangz	2:36
7.	"I Ain't Perfect" (featuring Blxst)	Tariq Beats; Musik MajorX; Jared Scharff	3:32
8.	"Can't Let You Go" (featuring Eric Bellinger)	Tariq Beats; Musik MajorX	2:35
9.	"Pricetag" (featuring Polo G and Lil Poppa)	India Got Them Beats; Seph Got The Waves	3:50
10.	"The Homies Wanna Know"	JabariOnTheBeat	3:37
11.	"Overcame"	Mook Got The Keys Jumpin	2:49
12.	"Off the Muscle" (featuring Celly Ru and E Mozzy)	L Finguz	3:39
13.	"Big Homie from the Hood"	Drum Dummie	2:59
Total length:			41:42

== Charts ==
Chart (2020)	Peak position
US Billboard 200	43
US Top R&B/Hip-Hop Albums (Billboard)	25
US Top Rap Albums (Billboard)	18
US Independent Albums (Billboard)	4
