= Rexx Life Raj =

American rapper and singer

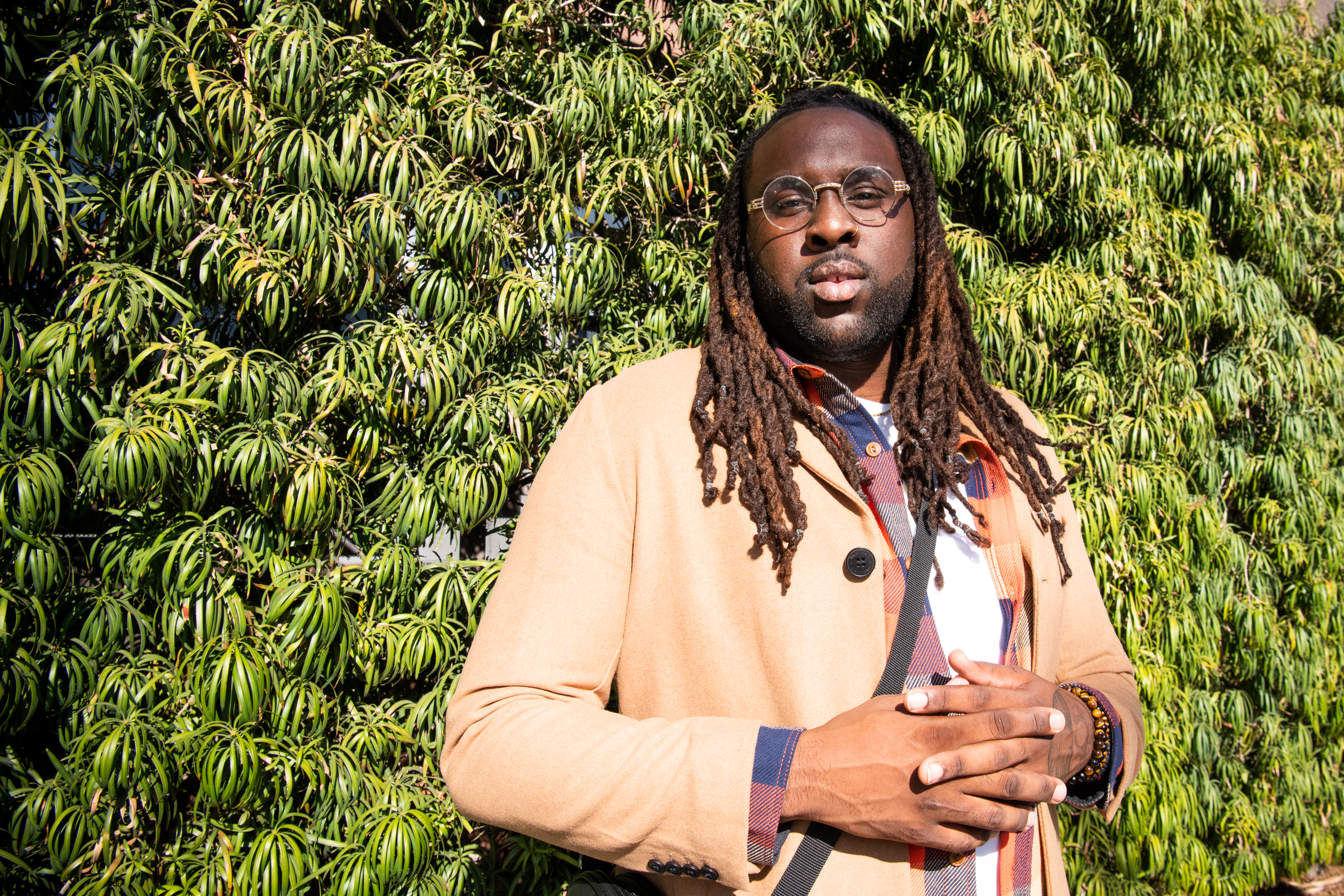

Background information
- Born: Faraji Omar Wright; January 30, 1990 (age 36); Berkeley, California, U.S.
- Genre: Hip hop
- Occupations: Rapper, singer
- Labels: Rexx Life/EMPIRE, Emoji Goats, Dead at 27
- Website: rexxliferaj.com

Faraji Omar Wright, also known as Rexx Life Raj, is an American rapper and singer. He has released five albums, including the Father Figure trilogy, and four EPs.

== Early life ==
Faraji Omar Wright grew up in Berkeley, California. His mother was in a gospel group called The Marshall Quartet with his aunts, uncle, and grandmother. His father was a Black Panther. In middle school, Wright began recording his own music, making the beats on a Casio keyboard and singing with a karaoke machine, making CDs he sold at school. Wright went to middle and high school with G-Eazy.

In 2010, he played offensive tackle and guard for the Fiesta Bowl-winning Boise State University football team. After graduation, Wright returned home to California to pursue music while working at his parents' package delivery business.

"Neo-soul music became my favorite when I could begin to appreciate it. I was into Lauryn Hill, Erykah Badu, and Musiq Soulchild. [Kid Cudi's] Man on the Moon: End of Day is one of, if not my favorite album of all-time", he told Billboard.

== Career ==
Wright adopted the professional stage name Rexx Life Raj for his rap and singing career. He released his first EP for sale, Hidden Clouds, in 2014, which featured the single "Put On". That same year, he released the Portraits EP with producer Tele Fresco. In 2015, he released another two projects, the full-length album, The Escape, with guests Iamsu!, Will Fraker, City Shawn, and the EP, Dreamland: Telegraph Ave., with YMTK, Ellen Purtell, and Lolo Zouaï.

In 2016, with his second album, Father Figure, Raj developed his sound, combining rhymes with singing "confessional" and political lyrics in tracks like "Handheld GPS" and, the album's first single, "Moxie Java" featuring another Vallejo-area rapper Nef the Pharaoh.

Raj's sequel album, Father Figure 2: Flourish, came out in 2017 with features from G-Eazy, Russ, and Iman Europe. That year he toured with Mr. Carmack.

In 2018, he released EP California Poppy, produced entirely by Kyle Betty, and toured twice in support of both Marc E. Bassy and Bas, as well as his first headlining tour in Europe in 2019.

In 2019, Raj released Father Figure 3: Somewhere Out There produced by Sango, Kenny Beats, JULiA LEWiS, Avedon and Bay Area producers Kyle Betty, DTB, Wax Roof and Drew Banga. Songs included "Burgundy Regal," about his two childhood best friends, one of whom was eventually killed, the other incarcerated; "Your Way", an acoustic duet with Kehlani that also featured Russ, and was premiered on Zane Lowe's Beats 1 show. Father Figure 3: Somewhere Out was recorded most of the vocals in hotels and Airbnbs on the road touring as opening act for Bas.

Raj did a headline tour of the United States in 2019.

In 2022, he released his fifth album The Blue Hour with features from Wale, Larry June, Russ, and Fireboy DML.

== Discography ==
Year	Recording	Label	Notes
2014	Hidden Clouds	Dead at 27	EP
2014	Portraits	Dead at 27	EP
2015	The Escape	Rexx Life	Album
2015	Dreamland: Telegraph Avenue	Rexx Life	EP
2016	Father Figure	Rexx Life/EMPIRE	Album
2017	Father Figure 2: Flourish	Rexx Life/EMPIRE	Album
2017	Emoji Goats (with YMTK)	Emoji Goats	EP
2018	California Poppy	Rexx Life	EP
2019	Father Figure 3: Somewhere Out	Rexx Life/EMPIRE	Album
2020	California Poppy 2	Rexx Life/EMPIRE	EP
2022	The Blue Hour	Rexx Life/EMPIRE	Album
2023	California Poppy 3	Rexx Life/EMPIRE	Album
2025	In Rhythm	Rexx Life/EMPIRE	Album
