= Mozzy =

American rapper (born 1987)

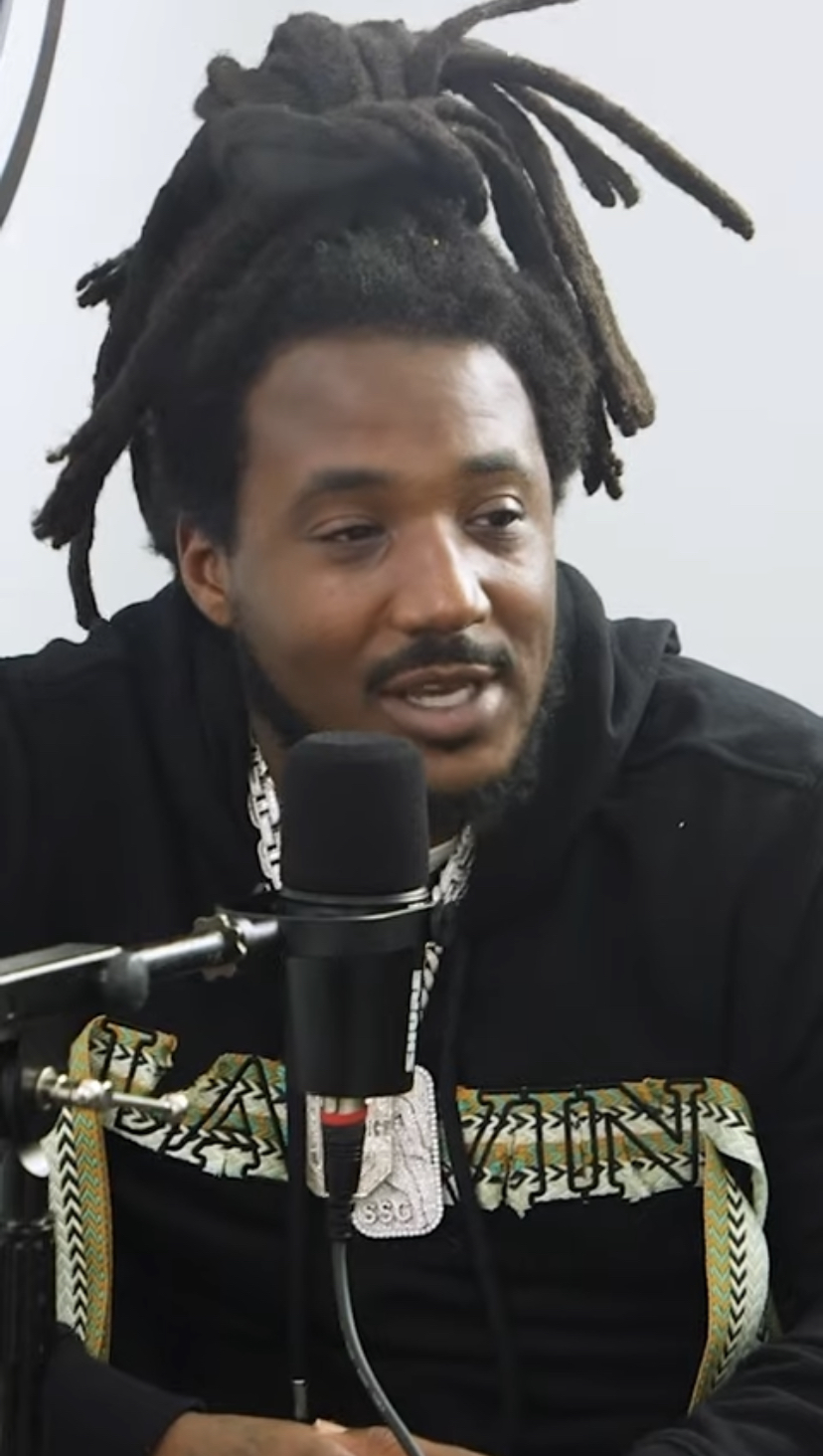
- Mozzy in 2023

Background information
- Also known as: Lil Tim
- Born: Timothy Cornell Patterson; June 24, 1987 (age 39); Oak Park, Sacramento, California, U.S.
- Genres: West Coast hip-hop; trap; gangsta rap
- Occupations: Rapper; songwriter
- Years active: 1999–present
- Labels: Livewire; Virgin; Collective; Interscope; EMPIRE; Real Talk; Black Market
- Website: www.mozzyfoundation.com

Timothy Cornell Patterson (born June 24, 1987), known professionally as Mozzy, is an American rapper from Sacramento, California. He signed with Yo Gotti's record label Collective Music Group (CMG), an imprint of Interscope Records in 2022, having previously been signed with the independent label Black Market Records. He is best known for his 2021 single "Last One Standing" (with Skylar Grey, Polo G, and Eminem) from the film Venom: Let There Be Carnage, which peaked at number 78 on the Billboard Hot 100.

Patterson began his recording career in 1999 under the name Lil Tim. He gained recognition with the release of his mixtape Bladadah (2015), which was ranked as the 22nd Best Rap Album of that year by Rolling Stone, and gave him the "best run" of 2015 according to Complex. Each of his first seven studio albums—1 Up Top Ahk (2017), Gangland Landlord (2018), Beyond Bulletproof (2020), Occupational Hazard (2020), Untreated Trauma (2021), Survivor's Guilt (2022), and Children of the Slums (2024)—entered the Billboard 200, in addition to his collaborative album with fellow California rapper YG—Kommunity Service (2021)—and compilation albums with CMG—Gangsta Art (2022) and Gangsta Art 2 (2023).

== Early life ==
Patterson grew up on 4th Avenue, in Sacramento's Oak Park neighborhood. His parents were not in his life, so he was raised by his grandmother Brenda Patterson-Usher, a Black Panther party member, who owned several homes throughout Oak Park. Patterson attended Sacramento High School and American Legion Continuation School, but eventually dropped out and earned a GED. He worked various local jobs until he decided to pursue his music career full-time in 2010. In a 2017 interview with CivilTV, he stated that he used to walk around his neighborhood with a hoodie over his head out of embarrassment as to not be noticed by his neighbors and peers. He later states that this was his motivation to pursue music full-time.

== Career ==
=== Career beginnings ===
In 2010 under the stage name "Lil Tim", Mozzy released a single titled "U Ain't Really Like 'Dat", his first release as a full-time musician. Mozzy released his first solo mixtape in 2011 under the title Money Means Mozzy.

In April 2013, Mozzy released a diss track titled 'The Truth', which was aimed at several rappers and gang members in South Sacramento. In an interview with VladTV in June 2016, Mozzy claims Alonzo Walsh, nicknamed 'Zilla Zoe' to those close to him, had appeared in the video and was killed in a drive by shooting within 12 hours of the videos release as revenge. The Sacramento Police Department concluded Walsh's death stemmed from a gang rivalry. Patterson stated that he had advised Walsh before the video shoot not to appear due to its 'message'.

=== 2014–2016: Goonbody Embodiment and Bladadah ===
In March 2014, Mozzy released the track "I'm Just Bein Honest", featuring Philthy Rich, aimed at rapper CML Lavish D, which began a rap feud.

Mozzy released his third solo album, Goonbody Embodiment, which features a collaboration with Oakland rapper Philthy Rich, on the track "I'm Just Being Honest" in early May 2014, which caused a longstanding controversy In December the same year, Compton rapper YG released a single titled "City Mad" featuring Mozzy and associate "Slim 400" leading up to the release of his album, Still Krazy.

In 2015, he released the Mixtape Bladadah, which had been awarded the "best run of 2015" by Complex magazine for had the "best run of 2015", and was ranked the 22nd best rap album of 2015 by Rolling Stone

In January 2016, Vallejo rapper Nef the Pharaoh released the album Neffy Got Wings, featuring a track with Mozzy called "Devil's Team". Mozzy moved from Sacramento to Los Angeles, California and released the album Gang Related Siblings, featuring his fellow Oak Park native and producer June later that year.

=== 2016–2017: Mandatory Check, Fake Famous, and 1 Up Top Ahk ===
On August 2, 2016, he released Lil Timothy N Thingz, a collection of songs recorded in 2008 while he had still been known as "Lil Tim".

In November 2016, Mozzy released the mixtape Mandatory Check, which reached no. 7 on the Billboard Rap Albums chart.

In January 2017, Mozzy released the mixtape Fake Famous. It features several artists, including YG, Jadakiss, and G-Eazy. In August 2017, Mozzy released his debut studio album, 1 Up Top Ahk, which charted at number 68 on the Billboard 200.

In August 2017, a feud between Mozzy and C-Bo began when Mozzy released a music video for the song "New Era New King", dissing C-Bo. C-Bo responded with a song within the same month titled "Body 4 Body".

=== 2018–2020: Gangland Landlord, Internal Affairs, and Beyond Bulletproof ===
In 2018, Mozzy's second studio album Gangland Landlord was released. It peaked at number 57 on the US Billboard 200.

In May 2019, Mozzy released the mixtape Internal Affairs, which features guest appearances from Lil Poppa and TeeJay3k, among others. In 2019, Mozzy released a full-length collaboration album called Chop Stixx and Banana Clips, with Gunplay. Writing about the project for Freemusicempire, Dan-O praised the project, stating "Gunplay and Mozzy paint pictures so you can see the crook's whole journey, not just the sentence".

On May 1, 2020, he released his third studio album, Beyond Bulletproof. The 13-track project follows 2019's Internal Affairs and includes the singles "Pricetag", "I Ain't Perfect", "Overcame", and "Big Homie from the Hood". The music video for "Big Homie from the Hood" was filmed at McClatchy Park, near 4th Avenue in the Oak Park Neighborhood of South Sacramento where the rapper grew up. Mozzy enlisted various artists on the album, including King Von, G Herbo, Eric Bellinger, and Polo G. The album debuted at number 43 on the Billboard 200, becoming Mozzy's highest-charting at the time.

=== 2020–2021: Occupational Hazard, Kommunity Service, and Untreated Trauma ===
On September 23, 2020, Mozzy returned with his second project of 2020, Occupational Hazard. He described it as his favorite project and said the album goes back to his "old" style.

Mozzy started 2021 by releasing the single "Bompton to Oak Park", which was a collaboration with fellow California rapper YG. The single was the lead single to a collaborative album titled Kommunity Service, which was released on May 21 of that year. The album peaked at number 88 on the Billboard 200. In September of that year, Mozzy released his sixth studio album, titled Untreated Trauma. The album debuted at number 19 on the Billboard 200, surpassing Beyond Bulletproof as his highest-charting album.

On September 30, 2021, Mozzy was featured on the song "Last One Standing" by Skylar Grey, along with Eminem and Polo G, featured on the soundtrack for the film Venom: Let There Be Carnage.

=== 2022–present: Survivor's Guilt and Kollect Kall ===
On February 10, 2022, Mozzy signed his major-label contract in a joint venture with CMG and Interscope Records and shortly after, released the single "Real Ones" featuring Roddy Ricch, which was the lead single to his album Survivor's Guilt. It was released on July 22, 2022, and peaked at number 40 on the Billboard 200.

== Personal life ==
Between 2005 and 2008, Patterson was arrested three times by the Sacramento Police for possession crimes, including illegal possession of a firearm and evading police. He was arrested again in 2014 and served a sentence in San Quentin State Prison, during which his brother and colleague E Mozzy released the album Free Mozzy. After his release, Mozzy decided to focus solely on his music, releasing four solo albums in 2015. Despite receiving offers to perform across the nation and worldwide, Patterson was unable to leave the state of California until 2017 due to being on probation.

Patterson was arrested in July 2018 during a traffic stop in Las Vegas for gun possession.

In July 2022, Patterson pled guilty to a charge of possession of a firearm by a convicted felon and was sentenced to one year in prison, as well as a $55,000 fine. He served his sentence at USP Atwater and was released in May 2023 after serving 10 months.

Patterson is a father to two daughters. His youngest daughter was born in early 2018.

== Discography ==
=== Studio albums ===
List of studio albums with selected chart positions
Title	Album details	Peak chart positions			
Title	Album details	US	US R&B/HH	US Rap	US Ind.
1 Up Top Ahk	Released: August 18, 2017; Label: Mozzy Records / Empire Distribution	68	36	—	7
Gangland Landlord	Released: October 5, 2018; Label: Mozzy Records / Empire Distribution	57	27	25	9
Beyond Bulletproof	Released: May 1, 2020; Label: Mozzy Records / Empire Distribution	43	25	18	4
Occupational Hazard	Released: September 23, 2020; Label: Mozzy Records / Empire Distribution	190	—	—	38
Untreated Trauma	Released: September 17, 2021; Label: Mozzy Records / Empire Distribution	19	10	9	3
Survivor's Guilt	Released: July 22, 2022; Label: Mozzy Records / Collective Music Group / Interscope	40	23	14	—
Children of the Slums	Released: April 19, 2024; Label: Mozzy Records / Collective Music Group / Virgin	199	—	—	33
Brash Dummies	Released: August 30, 2024; Label: Mozzy Records / Collective Music Group / Virgin	—	—	—	—
Intrusive Thoughts	Released: April 18, 2025; Label: Mozzy Records / Collective Music Group / Empire Distribution	—	—	—	—

=== Compilation albums ===
Title	Details	Peak chart positions
Title	Details	US
Gangsta Art (with CMG the Label)	Released: July 15, 2022; Label: CMG, Interscope; Format: Digital download, streaming	11
Gangsta Art 2 (with CMG the Label)	Released: September 29, 2023; Label: CMG, Interscope; Format: Digital download, streaming	78

=== Collaborative albums ===
Title	Release date	Label
Dope Money (with J-Roq)	January 5, 2012	Independent
Earthquakes and Murder Rates (with Dutch Santana)	April 29, 2016	Blood Work Ent.
Extracurricular Activities (with Stevie Joe)	April 29, 2016	Green Carpet Ent. / Livewire Records
Fraternal Twins (with E Mozzy)	May 12, 2016	Mozzy Records
Mob Ties (with Red-Dot)	May 27, 2016	Fallout Records
Promise Not to Fumble (with Troublez)	July 22, 2016	Troublez Music
Gang Related Siblings (with June)	August 18, 2016	Mozzy Records
Political Ties (with Philthy Rich)	September 2, 2016	Mozzy Records / SCMMLLC
Fraternal Twins 2 (with E Mozzy)	October 19, 2016	Mozzy Records
Tapped In (with Trae tha Truth)	December 16, 2016	Mozzy Records / ABN / Empire
Can't Fake the Real (with Blac Youngsta, Hosted by DaBoyDame)	May 19, 2017	Play Too Much Entertainment
Dreadlocks & Headshots (with Gunplay)	June 2, 2017	Real Talk Entertainment
Money Makkin Murder (with Lit Soxx)	December 2, 2017	Muscle Up Music
Legendary Gangland (with Yhung T.O.)	December 8, 2017	Mozzy Records / SOB X RBE / Empire
Hell Made (with Yowda)	December 26, 2017	Mozzy Records / YMI LLC
Run It Up Activities (with Kae One)	June 8, 2018	Team Player Records
Slimey Individualz (with Berner)	February 13, 2019	Bern One Ent / Mozzy Records / Empire
Chop Stixx & Banana Clips (with Gunplay)	September 13, 2019	Real Talk Entertainment
Blood Cuzzins (with Tsu Surf)	November 20, 2019	Mozzy Records / Foundation Media / Empire
Kommunity Service (with YG)	May 21, 2021	Mozzy Records / 4Hunnid / Empire
Bloody Waters (with Lil Blood)	September 10, 2021	Mozzy Records ‘’ Cadillac (with Sidhu Moosewala)

=== Mixtapes and EPs ===
Title	Album details	Peak chart positions			
Title	Album details	US R&B/HH	US Rap	US Ind.	US Heat.
Izizzel Izzy Izie Izim	Released: 2011; Label: independent	—	—	—	—
Money Means Mozzy	Released: 2011; Label: independent	—	—	—	—
Money Makin Mozzy	Released: 2011; Label: independent	—	—	—	—
Dope Fiend Tryna Get His Corsica Back	Released: December 20, 2011; Label: independent	—	—	—	—
The Tonite Show with Mozzy (Hosted by DJ Fresh)	Released: November 19, 2013; Label: Sumo / Fresh in the Flesh	—	—	—	—
Goonbody Embodiment	Released: February 14, 2014; Label: independent	—	—	—	—
Next Body On You	Released: April 19, 2014; Label: independent	—	—	—	—
Next Body On You Part 2	Released: November 7, 2014; Label: independent	—	—	—	—
Gangland Landscape	Released: April 25, 2015; Label: independent	—	—	—	—
Bladadah	Released: July 11, 2015; Label: independent	—	—	—	—
Yellow Tape Activities	Released: September 11, 2015; Label: Black Market	—	—	—	—
Down to the Wire: 4th Ave Edition	Released: November 27, 2015; Label: Live Entertainment	—	—	—	—
Hexa Hella Extra Headshots 2	Released: February 9, 2016; Label: independent	—	—	—	—
Beautiful Struggle	Released: March 11, 2016; Label: Mozzy	—	—	—	—
Mandatory Check	Released: June 10, 2016; Label: Mozzy / Empire Distribution	11	7	26	6
Lil Timothy n' Thingz	Released: July 29, 2016; Label: Mozzy	—	—	—	—
1 Up Top Finna Drop (EP)	Released: November 16, 2016; Label: Mozzy / Empire Distribution	—	—	—	—
Fake Famous	Released: January 26, 2017; Label: Mozzy / Empire Distribution	—	—	—	—
Spiritual Conversations (EP)	Released: March 2, 2018; Label: Mozzy / Empire Distribution	—	—	18	—
Internal Affairs	Released: May 28, 2019; Label: Mozzy / Empire Distribution	—	—	—	—
Kollect Kall (EP)	Released: April 7, 2023; Label: Mozzy / Collective Music Group / Interscope	—	—	—	—

=== Singles ===
==== As lead artist ====
Title	Year	Peak chart positions								Certifications	Album
Title	Year	US	US R&B/HH	US Rap	AUS	CAN	IRE	UK	WW	Certifications	Album
"I Ain't Perfect" (featuring Blxst)	2020	—	—	—	—	—	—	—	—	RIAA: Gold	Beyond Bulletproof
"Pricetag" (featuring Polo G and Lil Poppa)	2020	—	— (Note: "Pricetag" did not enter the Hot R&B/Hip Hop Songs, but peaked at number 17 on the R&B/Hip-Hop Digital Song Sales chart.)	— (Note: "Pricetag" did not enter the Hot Rap Songs, but peaked at number 10 on the Rap Digital Song Sales chart.)	—	—	—	—	—		Beyond Bulletproof
"Last One Standing" (with Skylar Grey, Polo G and Eminem)	2021	78	31	25	70	38	47	46	53	RIAA: Gold	Non-album single

==== As featured artist ====
Title	Year	Peak chart positions			Certifications	Album
Title	Year	US Bub.	US R&B/HH	US Rap	Certifications	Album
"Mando" ($tupid Young featuring Mozzy)	2017	—	—	—	RIAA: Gold	One of One
"Steppers" (Yo Gotti, Moneybagg Yo and 42 Dugg featuring CMG the Label, EST Gee, Blac Youngsta and Mozzy)	2022	4	26	25		Gangsta Art

=== Other charted and certified songs ===
Title	Year	Peak chart positions		Certifications	Album
Title	Year	US Bub.	US R&B/HH	Certifications	Album
"Sleep Walkin"	2017	—	—	RIAA: Platinum	1 Up Top Ahk
"Tomorrow Ain't Promised" (featuring Rexx Life Raj, Boosie Badazz, and E Mozzy)	2017	—	—	RIAA: Gold	1 Up Top Ahk
"Excuse Me" (with Yhung T.O. featuring DCMBR and Too Short)	2017	—	—	RIAA: Gold	Legendary Gangland and Gangland Landlord
"Gangsta Art" (Yo Gotti, Moneybagg Yo and CMG the Label featuring Blac Youngsta, Lehla Samia, EST Gee, 42 Dugg and Mozzy)	2022	17	41		Gangsta Art
