= YG (rapper) =

American rapper (born 1990)

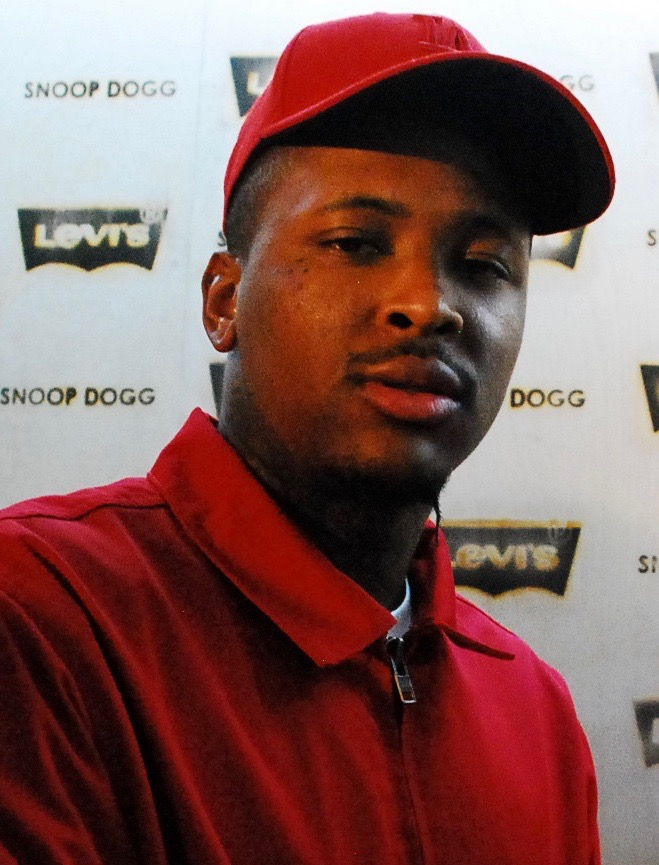
- YG in 2015

Background information
- Born: Keenon Dequan Ray Jackson; March 9, 1990 (age 36); Compton, California, U.S.
- Genres: West Coast hip-hop; Gangsta rap; G-Funk
- Occupations: Rapper; songwriter; actor
- Works: YG discography
- Years active: 2008–present
- Labels: 4Hunnid; EpicDef Jam; CTE World; Interscope; BMG; 10K Projects
- Children: 2
- Website: 4hunnid.com

Keenon Dequan Ray Jackson (born March 9, 1990), better known by his stage name YG (acronym for "Young Gangsta"), is an American rapper. He released his debut mixtape, 4Fingaz, in 2008, and its follow-up, The Real 4Fingaz, the following year. The latter spawned the hit song "Toot It and Boot It", which entered the Billboard Hot 100 at number 67 and received platinum certification by the Recording Industry Association of America (RIAA). He signed a recording contract with Def Jam Recordings in October 2009, which entered joint-venture with Atlanta-based rapper Jeezy's record label, CTE World, in 2013.

His 2013 single, "My Nigga" (featuring Jeezy and Rich Homie Quan), peaked at number 19 on the Billboard Hot 100. The song and its follow-ups, "Left, Right" (featuring DJ Mustard) and "Who Do You Love?" (featuring Drake), preceded the release of his debut studio album, My Krazy Life (2014), which peaked at number two on the Billboard 200 and saw positive critical reception. Also in 2014, he guest appeared on Jeremih's single "Don't Tell 'Em", which peaked at number six on the Hot 100 and remains his highest-charting song. His second album, Still Brazy (2016), was met with critical acclaim despite less commercial orientation, as it explored political and social issues for its subject matter.

His next three studio albums — Stay Dangerous (2018), 4Real 4Real (2019), and My Life 4Hunnid (2020) — each debuted within the Billboard 200's top ten; the former spawned the single "Big Bank" (featuring 2 Chainz, Big Sean and Nicki Minaj), which peaked at number 16 on the Billboard Hot 100 and remains his highest-charting song as a lead artist. His sixth album, I Got Issues (2022) moderately entered the chart and served as his final release on Def Jam; his seventh album, The Gentlemen's Club (2026), failed to enter the Billboard 200. His collaborative albums, Kommunity Service (2021) with Mozzy and Hit Me When U Leave the Klub: The Playlist (2023) with Tyga, were both self-released and met with critical praise.

== Early life ==
Keenon Dequan Ray Jackson was born on March 9, 1990, in Compton, California. He grew up in Paramount, California going to Craig Williams Elementary School in Lakewood, California and then Paramount High and Mayfair High in Bellflower, California but represents the 400 block of West Spruce Street in Compton, California. The 400 block name would inspire his "4hunnid" tag, along with the names of his record label and streetwear brands. His stage name "YG" stands for "Young Gangsta." YG joined the Tree Top Piru Bloods in 2006 at age 16. His father served time in jail for tax fraud.

== Career ==
=== 2008–2012: Beginnings ===
YG created the "Pu$haz Ink" record label and group with DJ Mustard in 2008. After releasing several songs that garnered him a large following on the internet, such as "She A Model" and "Aim Me" YG signed to Def Jam in 2009. According to Max Gousse, the senior VP of A&R at Island/Def Jam who inked the rapper, the signing stemmed from a newfound emphasis on West Coast artists by label president/CEO L.A. Reid, as well as, YG's technical ability and stage presence. However, just as he was getting his buzz up in mid-2009, he was arrested on a parole violation, stemming from a previous charge of residential burglary. Following this, he worked on mixtapes, touring, and a clothing line based on his brand, 4Hunnid. Def Jam re-released "Toot It and Boot It," which features singer Ty Dolla Sign in June 2010, and became the rapper's first hit song. He was also included as part of XXL's 2011 Freshmen Class. Beginning with YG's mixtape The Real 4 Fingaz, Mustard began further producing on YG's projects. Their work resulted in songs such as "I'm Good", "Bitches Ain't Shit" featuring Tyga and Nipsey Hussle, and "You Broke", also featuring Nipsey Hussle. The singles were met with moderate success, but not near as much as his debut single.

=== 2012–2014: Signing with CTE World and My Krazy Life ===
In 2012, he announced his debut album, then titled “I'm 4rm Bompton”. Later in June 2013, he revealed that Jeezy's record label CTE World would release the album. He was then featured on Yo Gotti's "Act Right" also featuring Jeezy. It would peak at number 100 on the Billboard Hot 100. He was then prominently featured on the CTE World mixtape, Boss Yo Life Up Gang in August 2013.

On September 4, 2013, YG announced that his debut album would be released on November 19, 2013, via Def Jam Recordings and that he has changed the album title to My Krazy Life. He also revealed that Drake would be featured on a song titled "Who Do You Love?", produced by DJ Mustard. Shortly thereafter, he released the album's lead single "My Nigga" featuring Rich Homie Quan and Jeezy, also produced by DJ Mustard. The song has since peaked at number 19 on the US Billboard Hot 100. On December 10, 2013, YG released the DJ Mustard-produced "Left, Right" as the album's second single. The following day, Def Jam announced that My Krazy Life would be released on March 18, 2014 and that "Who Do You Love?" featuring Drake would be the album's next single. On February 18, 2014, YG revealed the cover artwork for his debut album My Krazy Life. The artwork features YG posing for a mugshot, with his name and album title detailed in the placard around his neck. It was released on March 18, 2014.

=== 2015–2019: Still Brazy, Stay Dangerous and 4Real 4Real ===
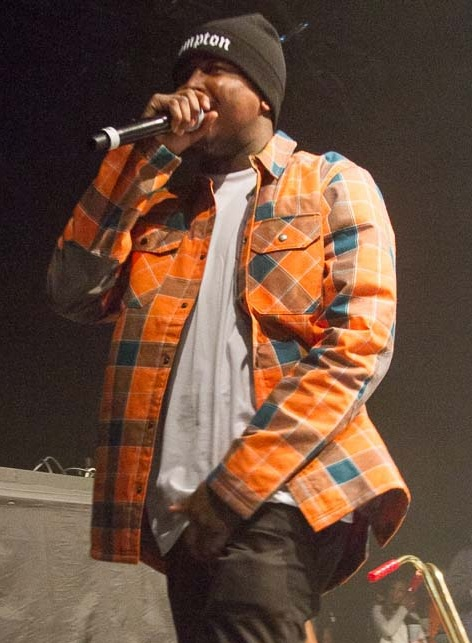
YG performing in 2015

On June 24, 2015, in an interview with Billboard, YG revealed that his second studio album would be called Still Krazy and it would be released in 2015 On July 15, 2015, YG teased the first single for the album, "Twist My Fingaz" on Instagram. The same day, YG released the single, "Cash Money" featuring Krayzie Bone. The full version of "Twist My Fingaz" was released July 17, 2015. On December 12, 2015, he released the second single, titled "I Want a Benz" featuring rappers Nipsey Hussle and 50 Cent.

Still Brazy was released on June 17, 2016. The third single "Why You Always Hatin?" premiered on OVO Sound Radio on May 21, 2016, featuring rappers Drake and Kamaiyah. On November 25, 2016, he digitally released the Black Friday inspired Red Friday, containing 8 new tracks.

YG announced through social media Just Re'd Up 3: Know Your Worth on December 17, 2016, and again on March 16, 2017. The project was to be executively produced DJ Mustard. It has yet to release, with no comment from YG or DJ Mustard.

On February 3, 2017, the song "I Don't", by American singer Mariah Carey was released, featuring YG. Carey and YG performed "I Don't" live on Jimmy Kimmel Live! on February 15, 2017. On March 24, 2017, a remix featuring Remy Ma and YG was released.

YG announced his third studio album would be Stay Dangerous on his Instagram page in February 2018. It was released the same year.

On April 3, 2019, YG announced a "surprise album" titled 4Real 4Real via Twitter originally due for release on April 12, being delayed to May 24 due to the death of his close friend Nipsey Hussle. It was released to positive reviews. The album includes the single "Go Loko" and the diss track aimed at 6ix9ine, "Stop Snitchin".

=== 2020–present: My Life 4Hunnid and The Gentlemen's Club ===
As of 2020, YG has released a number of songs, including the protest track, "FTP (Fuck the Police)", with the video shot at a Black Lives Matter protest in Hollywood, following the murder of George Floyd. He also joined Public Enemy, alongside Nas, Questlove, and Rapsody, among others, at the 2020 BET Awards for a performance of Public Enemy's classic track "Fight the Power". On July 10, YG released the single "War", with a video where he is dressed as footballer Colin Kaepernick.

On September 15, 2020, YG took to his social media to announce his new album My Life 4Hunnid, which was released on October 2, 2020. The album was entirely recorded during the COVID-19 pandemic and was "highly influenced" by 2Pac. The same week, he released the single "Money Mouf", with Saweetie and Tyga. On September 23, 2020, YG released the single, "Out on Bail", inspired by 2Pac's song of the same name.

YG's 2014 song "Meet the Flockers" has sparked accusations of racism against the Asian American community, especially Chinese Americans, since 2016. In the song, YG raps "First, you find a house and scope it out / Find a Chinese neighborhood, cause they don't believe in bank accounts." In the succeeding lyrics, YG describes a home invasion and burglary. Receiving little controversy when first released, over the years the song accumulated media attention, scrutiny, and protest. By 2021, community members, politicians such as San Francisco Supervisor Jane Kim, and YouTube employees demanded that the song be removed from YouTube. YouTube stated that the song's lyrics did violate its hate speech policies, but refused to remove the song on artistic grounds. YG has described "Meet the Flockers" as being representative of the culture he grew up in, and alluded to past experiences committing crimes. By 2021, the song was reuploaded to streaming platforms with the controversial lyrics edited out.

On May 3, 2021, YG announced his first collaborative album, with Sacramento rapper Mozzy. It was announced under the working title Perfect Timing, but was later changed to Kommunity Service and released on May 21, 2021. The cover art serves as a tribute to late rapper DMX and the film Belly, in which he starred in. The album was supported by two singles: "Bompton to Oak Park" and "Perfect Timing" featuring Blxst.

Since his collaboration with Mozzy, YG has released two more projects: his sixth studio album, 2022's I Got Issues and 2024's Just Re'd Up 3. YG also performed at The Pop Out: Ken and Friends, a 2024 Kendrick Lamar concert occurring in the wake of the Lamar-Drake feud.

On May 27, 2026, YG announced his eighth studio album, The Gentlemen's Club. The album was released on June 19, 2026 and features guest appearances from Pusha T, Tyler, the Creator, Shoreline Mafia, JID, Ab-Soul, and Buddy. On On July 23, 2026, YG's collaboration with The Game, Timbaland and Swizz Beatz, "Red People", was released.

== Other ventures ==
=== Pushaz Ink ===
When YG originally came up with the idea for a label (originally titled Pushaz Ink, stylized as Pu$haz Ink), he later attempted to co-found it with DJ Mustard and Ty Dolla $ign. Originally the "label" was used as a promotional tool and a brand for YG and DJ Mustard's group of rap collaborators they had grown up with. But as they moved forward in laying the groundwork for the label and its roster, plans for the label were scrapped when their meeting with Capitol failed and the three artists decided to go their separate ways.

=== 4Hunnid Records ===
4Hunnid Records
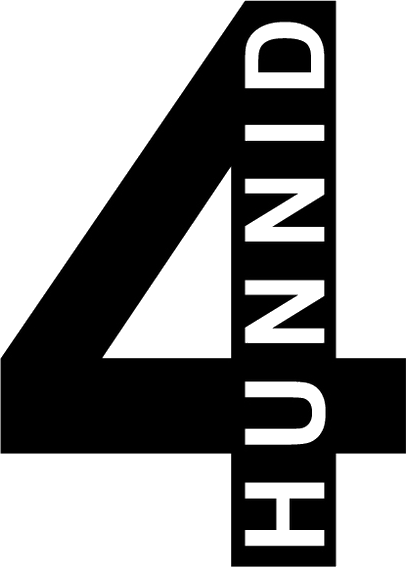
- Founded: 2015; 11 years ago
- Founder: YG; Brandon Z. Moore
- Distributor: Epic Records
- Genre: Hip-hop
- Country of origin: United States
- Location: Compton, California
- Official website: 4hunnid.com

There were rumors throughout 2016 that YG would be launching a new label under the name 4Hunnid. They originally begun when YG released a fashion line prominently featuring the 4Hunnid logo. This was confirmed to be true on August 17, 2016, when Billboard magazine reported that YG signed a distribution deal for the label under the 4Hunnid name with Interscope Records and Empire Distribution. The name is a reference to the 400 block of West Spruce Street in Compton, CA, where he grew up.

== Personal life ==
YG has two daughters from a previous relationship named Harmony and Vibe, born May 2015 and July 2019, respectively. YG is a member of the Compton-based Westside Tree Top Piru gang. On January 25, 2012, shots were fired during the filming of YG's music video "I'm a Thug". The police shut down and closed the set.

On June 12, 2015, YG was shot in the hip at a recording studio in Studio City, California, resulting in three separate wounds in his hip. Authorities said that YG was "very uncooperative" when asked about the incident. His manager later revealed that his injuries were not life-threatening and said he was "fine" and recovering. He returned to the studio the next day.

A 2018 robbery case against YG was dismissed in 2022 after he settled with a man who alleged that the rapper stole a chain from him in a Las Vegas casino. The chain was worth between $3,000-$9,000.

In 2019, a Cadillac Escalade owned by YG was involved in a shooting and police chase from Compton to Inglewood, California.

On September 6, 2019, it was confirmed that he and singer Kehlani were dating. As of 2023, YG was dating rapper Saweetie.

In January 2020, YG was arrested at his Southern California home on robbery charges. He was set to perform a Nipsey Hussle tribute at the Grammys several days before the arrest. He was held on $250,000 bail at the Men's Central Jail for arraignment on January 28, 2020. Charges against YG were ultimately not filed.

YG is a notable fan of the Los Angeles Rams NFL team, and was known to have befriended then-running back Todd Gurley. He was frequently spotted wearing a Rams home jersey in several video shoots and at several Rams’ home games, including one instance during the 2017 season against the Houston Texans in which Rams’ receiver Robert Woods caught a touchdown and jumped onto the table in the back of the endzone to celebrate alongside YG.

In October 2024, YG was arrested for driving under the influence.

On March 28, 2025, YG released a single called "2004" featuring Buddy and The Gang, in which he opened up about having been raped and taken advantage of sexually by an older woman when he was a minor.

== Discography ==
Studio albums

- My Krazy Life (2014)
- Still Brazy (2016)
- Stay Dangerous (2018)
- 4Real 4Real (2019)
- My Life 4Hunnid (2020)
- I Got Issues (2022)
- The Gentlemen's Club (2026)

Collaborative albums

- Kommunity Service (with Mozzy) (2021)
- Hit Me When U Leave the Klub: The Playlist (with Tyga) (2023)

== Filmography ==
Films and television
Year	Title	Role	Notes
2012	We the Party	C.C.	Support role
2012	Mac & Devin Go to High School	Student/Smoker	Cameo
2012	White T	YG	Performer
2014	Blame It On the Streets	YG	Main role; also executive producer and writer
2018	White Boy Rick	Leo Curry	Support role
2020	Dave	Himself	
2021	The Demi Lovato Show	Himself	Episode: "YG Uses His Voice"
2022	Good Mourning	Party Cameo	
2025	Night Patrol	Tripp	Also executive producer

== Tours ==
Headlining

- Fuck Donald Trump Tour (2016)
- Stay Dangerous Tour (2019)
- The Gentlemen's Club Tour

Supporting

- Drake vs. Lil Wayne (with Drake & Lil Wayne) (2014)
- Forest Hills Drive Tour (with J.Cole) (2015)
- Endless Summer Tour (with G-Eazy & Logic) (2016)
- The Damn Tour (with Kendrick Lamar) (2017)
- Legendary Nights Tour (with Meek Mill & Future) (2019)

== Awards and nominations ==
Year	Awards	Category	Nominated work	Result
2014	BET Awards	Best Collaboration	"My Nigga" (with Young Jeezy and Rich Homie Quan)	Nominated
2014	BET Hip Hop Awards	Best Collabo, Duo or Group	"My Nigga" (with Young Jeezy and Rich Homie Quan)	Won
2014	BET Hip Hop Awards	Best Club Banger	"My Nigga" (with Young Jeezy and Rich Homie Quan)	Nominated
2014	BET Hip Hop Awards	People's Champ Award	"My Nigga (Remix)" (with Lil Wayne, Nicki Minaj, Meek Mill and Rich Homie Quan)	Nominated
2014	BET Hip Hop Awards	Best Club Banger	"Cut Her Off (Remix)" (with K Camp, Lil Boosie and Too Short)	Nominated
2014	BET Hip Hop Awards	Rookie of the Year	—N/a	Nominated
2015	iHeartRadio Music Awards	Hip Hop/R&B Song of the Year	"Don't Tell 'Em" (with Jeremih)	Won
2015	Billboard Music Awards	Top R&B Song	"Don't Tell 'Em" (with Jeremih)	Nominated
2015	MTV Europe Music Awards	Best World Stage Performance	—	Nominated
