= Mustard production discography =

The following list is a discography of production by Mustard, an American hip hop and R&B music producer from Los Angeles, California. It includes a list of songs produced, co-produced and remixed by year, artist, album and title. In addition to producing songs for other artists, he has released four solo albums, 10 Summers (2014), Cold Summer (2016), Perfect Ten (2019), and Faith of a Mustard Seed (2024), which he produced entirely. He also executive produced projects other than his own such as YG's debut album My Krazy Life and Kid Ink's Summer in the Winter mixtape.

== Singles ==
List of singles produced, with selected chart positions and certifications, showing year released and album name
| Title | Year | Peak chart positions | | | | | | | | | | Certifications | Album |
| Title | Year | US | US Hot R&B/Hip Hop | US Rap | AUS | CAN | GER | IRE | NZ | SWI | UK | Certifications | Album |
|---|---|---|---|---|---|---|---|---|---|---|---|---|---|
| "Rack City" (Tyga) | 2011 | 7 | 1 | 2 | 56 | 53 | 60 | — | — | — | 39 | RIAA: 5× Platinum; ARIA: Gold; BPI: Gold; BVMI: Gold | Careless World: Rise of the Last King |
| "Bitches Aint Shit" (YG featuring Tyga and Nipsey Hussle) | 2012 | 100 | — | — | — | — | — | — | — | — | — | | Just Re Up'd |
| "T.O." (Problem featuring Skeme) | 2012 | — | 118 | — | — | — | — | — | — | — | — | | Welcome to Mollyworld |
| "#grindmode" (YG featuring 2 Chainz and Nipsey Hussle) | 2012 | — | — | — | — | — | — | — | — | — | — | | 4 Hunnid Degreez |
| "We In da Club" (Bow Wow) | 2012 | — | 112 | — | — | — | — | — | — | — | — | | —N/a |
| "I'm Different" (2 Chainz) | 2012 | 27 | 6 | 6 | — | — | — | — | — | — | — | RIAA: 3× Platinum | Based on a T.R.U. Story |
| "R.I.P." (Young Jeezy featuring 2 Chainz) | 2012 | 58 | 17 | 12 | — | — | — | — | — | — | — | RIAA: Platinum | It's tha World |
| "You Broke" (YG featuring Nipsey Hussle) | 2013 | — | — | — | — | — | — | — | — | — | — | | Just Re'd Up 2 |
| "HeadBand" (B.o.B featuring 2 Chainz) | 2013 | 53 | 16 | 15 | — | 67 | — | — | — | — | — | RIAA: 4× Platinum; RMNZ: Gold | Underground Luxury |
| "Helluva Night" (Ludacris) | 2013 | 96 | 31 | 23 | — | — | — | — | — | — | — | | #IDGAF |
| "Throw It Up" (Tyga) | 2013 | — | — | — | — | — | — | — | — | — | — | | Well Done 4 |
| "My Nigga" (YG featuring Jeezy and Rich Homie Quan) | 2013 | 19 | 5 | 4 | 69 | — | — | — | — | — | 53 | RIAA: 5× Platinum; BPI: Gold; MC: Gold | My Krazy Life |
| "Paranoid" (Ty Dolla Sign featuring B.o.B) | 2013 | 29 | 9 | — | — | — | — | — | — | — | — | RIAA: 2× Platinum; BPI: Silver; MC: Gold | Beach House EP |
| "Show Me" (Kid Ink featuring Chris Brown) | 2013 | 13 | 4 | 3 | 46 | 67 | 36 | — | 40 | 32 | 23 | RIAA: 4× Platinum; ARIA: Gold; BPI: Platinum; BVMI: Gold | My Own Lane |
| "Up Down (Do This All Day)" (T-Pain featuring B.o.B) | 2013 | 62 | 17 | — | — | — | — | — | — | — | 74 | RIAA: Platinum; BPI: Silver | T-Pain Presents Happy Hour: The Greatest Hits |
| "This D" (TeeFlii) | 2013 | — | — | — | — | — | — | — | — | — | — | | AnnieRUO'TAY |
| "Strong" (Young Dro) | 2013 | — | — | — | — | — | — | — | — | — | — | | High Times |
| "How to Be the Man" (Riff Raff) | 2013 | — | — | — | — | — | — | — | — | — | — | | Neon Icon |
| "Feelin' Myself" (Will.i.am featuring French Montana, Miley Cyrus, Wiz Khalifa and DJ Mustard) | 2013 | 96 | 29 | 18 | 34 | — | 55 | 3 | 16 | — | 2 | BPI: Platinum; RMNZ: Platinum | #willpower |
| "Left, Right" (YG featuring DJ Mustard) | 2013 | — | 44 | — | — | — | — | — | — | — | — | RIAA: Gold | My Krazy Life |
| "Numb" (August Alsina featuring B.o.B and Yo Gotti) | 2013 | — | 38 | — | — | — | — | — | — | — | — | RIAA: Gold | Testimony |
| "Na Na" (Trey Songz) | 2014 | 21 | 5 | — | 83 | — | — | — | — | — | 20 | RIAA: 2× Platinum; BPI: Gold; RMNZ: Platinum | Trigga |
| "2 On" (Tinashe featuring Schoolboy Q) | 2014 | 24 | 5 | — | 29 | 74 | — | — | — | — | 127 | RIAA: 4× Platinum; ARIA: Platinum; BPI: Platinum; MC: Gold; RMNZ: 2× Platinum | Aquarius |
| "Or Nah" (Ty Dolla Sign featuring Wiz Khalifa and DJ Mustard) | 2014 | 48 | 12 | — | — | 78 | — | — | — | — | — | RIAA: Diamond; BPI: Platinum; MC: 2× Platinum | Beach House EP |
| "Who Do You Love?" (YG featuring Drake) | 2014 | 54 | 15 | 6 | — | — | — | — | — | — | 87 | RIAA: 2× Platinum | My Krazy Life |
| "Main Chick" (Kid Ink featuring Chris Brown) | 2014 | 60 | 16 | 9 | — | — | 99 | — | — | — | 59 | RIAA: Platinum; BPI: Gold | My Own Lane |
| "24 Hours" (TeeFlii featuring 2 Chainz) | 2014 | 85 | 21 | 15 | — | — | — | — | — | — | — | | Starr |
| "Don't Tell 'Em" (Jeremih featuring YG) | 2014 | 6 | 2 | — | 14 | 30 | 57 | — | — | 70 | 5 | RIAA: 5× Platinum; ARIA: Platinum; BPI: Platinum; BVMI: Gold; IFPI DEN: Platinum; RMNZ: 2× Platinum | Late Nights |
| "No Mediocre" (T.I. featuring Iggy Azalea) | 2014 | 33 | 8 | 6 | 36 | 79 | — | — | 34 | — | 49 | RIAA: Platinum; ARIA: Gold; MC: Gold | Paperwork |
| "She" (Keyshia Cole) | 2014 | — | — | — | — | — | — | — | — | — | — | | Point of No Return |
| "You and Your Friends" (Wiz Khalifa featuring Snoop Dogg and Ty Dolla Sign) | 2014 | 82 | 21 | 18 | — | — | — | — | — | — | — | RIAA: Platinum | Blacc Hollywood |
| "Don't Panic" (French Montana) | 2014 | — | 37 | — | — | — | — | — | — | — | — | | —N/a |
| "Collide" (Justine Skye) | 2014 | — | 38 | — | — | — | — | — | — | — | — | RIAA: Platinum; BPI: Gold | Evolve |
| "I Don't Fuck with You" (Big Sean featuring E-40) | 2014 | 11 | 1 | 1 | 47 | 35 | 95 | — | 25 | — | 67 | RIAA: 9× Platinum; ARIA: 3× Platinum; BPI: Platinum; MC: 3× Platinum; RMNZ: 3× Platinum | Dark Sky Paradise |
| "Party Ain't a Party" (Jamie Foxx featuring 2 Chainz) | 2014 | — | — | — | — | — | — | — | — | — | — | | Non-album single |
| "L.A. Love (La La)" (Fergie) | 2014 | 27 | — | 5 | 53 | 28 | 100 | — | — | — | 3 | RIAA: Platinum; BPI: Gold; RMNZ: Gold | Double Dutchess |
| "Post to Be" (Omarion featuring Chris Brown and Jhene Aiko) | 2014 | 13 | 5 | — | 79 | 51 | — | — | — | — | 108 | RIAA: 6× Platinum; BPI : Platinum; RMNZ: 2× Platinum | Sex Playlist |
| "It Ain't You" (Jordin Sparks) | 2014 | — | — | — | — | — | — | — | — | — | — | | Right Here, Right Now |
| "Be Real" (Kid Ink featuring DeJ Loaf) | 2015 | 43 | 12 | 7 | — | — | — | 77 | — | — | — | RIAA: 2× Platinum; BPI: Gold; BVMI: Gold | Full Speed |
| "Only Right" (Ty Dolla $ign featuring YG, TeeCee 4800 and Joe Moses) | 2015 | — | — | — | — | — | — | — | — | — | — | | Free TC |
| "Figure 8" (Maliibu N Helene) | 2015 | — | — | — | — | — | — | — | — | — | — | | —N/a |
| "Freak of the Week" (Krept & Konan featuring Jeremih) | 2015 | — | — | — | — | — | — | — | — | — | 9 | BPI: Platinum | The Long Way Home |
| "Wuzhanindoe" (Gunplay featuring YG) | 2015 | — | — | — | — | — | — | — | — | — | — | | Living Legend |
| "Sorry to Interrupt" (Jessie J with Jhené Aiko and Rixton) | 2015 | — | — | — | — | — | — | — | — | — | — | | —N/a |
| "Get Home" (JR Castro featuring Kid Ink and Quavo) | 2015 | — | — | — | — | — | — | — | — | — | — | | —N/a |
| "The Fix" (Nelly featuring Jeremih) | 2015 | 62 | 20 | — | 3 | — | — | — | 15 | — | 82 | RIAA: Platinum; ARIA: 2× Platinum; BPI: Silver; RMNZ: 2× Platinum | —N/a |
| "Saved" (Ty Dolla $ign featuring E-40) | 2015 | 81 | 25 | — | — | — | — | — | — | — | — | RIAA: Platinum; MC: Gold | Free TC |
| "Promise" (Kid Ink featuring Fetty Wap) | 2015 | 57 | 19 | 9 | — | — | — | — | — | — | — | RIAA: 2× Platinum; BPI: Silver | Summer in the Winter |
| "Whole Lotta Lovin'" (Travis Scott featuring DJ Mustard) | 2016 | — | 38 | — | — | — | — | — | — | — | — | RIAA: Gold | |
| "Wavy" (Ty Dolla $ign featuring Joe Moses) | 2016 | — | 53 | — | — | — | — | — | — | — | — | RIAA: Platinum; BPI: Silver; MC: Gold | Free TC (Deluxe) |
| "Needed Me" (Rihanna) | 2016 | 7 | 3 | — | 48 | 27 | 57 | 58 | 16 | 45 | 45 | RIAA: Diamond; ARIA: 6× Platinum; BPI: 4× Platinum; BVMI: 4× Platinum; GLF: 6× Platinum; IFPI SWI: 4× Platinum; MC: Gold; RMNZ: 5× Platinum | Anti |
| "Just a Lil' Thick (She Juicy)" (Trinidad James featuring Mystikal and Lil Dicky) | 2016 | — | 52 | — | — | — | — | — | — | — | — | RIAA: Gold | —N/a |
| "Don't Hurt Me" (DJ Mustard featuring Nicki Minaj and Jeremih) | 2016 | — | — | — | — | — | — | — | — | — | — | RIAA: Gold | Cold Summer |
| "Want Her" (DJ Mustard featuring Quavo and YG) | 2017 | — | — | — | — | — | — | — | — | — | — | RIAA: Platinum | Cold Summer |
| "I Don't" (Mariah Carey featuring YG) | 2017 | 89 | 35 | — | — | — | — | — | — | — | — | | Non-album single |
| "Love U Better" (Ty Dolla Sign featuring Lil Wayne and The-Dream) | 2017 | — | 51 | — | 97 | — | — | — | — | — | — | RIAA: Gold | Beach House 3 |
| "Freaky Friday" (Lil Dicky featuring Chris Brown) | 2018 | 8 | 5 | — | 4 | 10 | 24 | 5 | 1 | 34 | 1 | RIAA: 5× Platinum; MC: 3× Platinum; ARIA: 3× Platinum; BPI: 2× Platinum; RMNZ: 3× Platinum | Non-album single |
| "Boo'd Up" (Ella Mai) | 2018 | 5 | 1 | 7 | 46 | 43 | – | 85 | 8 | – | 52 | RIAA: 8× Platinum; BPI: Gold; ARIA: 2× Platinum; MC: 2× Platinum; RMNZ: 3× Platinum | Ready |
| "Big Bank" (YG featuring 2 Chainz, Big Sean & Nicki Minaj) | 2018 | 16 | 13 | 11 | – | 53 | – | – | 29 | – | – | RIAA: 5× Platinum; MC: Gold | Stay Dangerous |
| "Trip" (Ella Mai) | 2018 | 11 | 6 | – | 77 | – | – | – | 22 | – | 47 | RIAA: 6× Platinum; BPI: Gold; ARIA: 2× Platinum; MC: 2× Platinum; RMNZ: 3× Platinum | Ella Mai |
| "With You" (Mariah Carey) | 2018 | – | 21 | – | – | – | – | – | – | – | – | | Caution |
| "Pure Water" (Mustard with Migos) | 2019 | 23 | 10 | 8 | 45 | 20 | — | 56 | 8 | — | 62 | RIAA: 5× Platinum; BPI: Gold; RMNZ: 2× Platinum | Perfect Ten |
| "Go Loko" (YG featuring Tyga and Jon Z) | 2019 | 49 | 16 | 13 | 41 | 30 | — | 65 | 15 | 36 | — | RIAA: 2× Platinum | 4Real 4Real |
| "Ballin'" (Mustard with Roddy Ricch) | 2019 | 11 | 4 | — | — | 37 | — | 54 | — | — | 72 | RIAA: 7× Platinum; ARIA: Platinum; BPI: Platinum; MC: Platinum; RMNZ: 3× Platinum | Perfect Ten |
| "Heartless" (Polo G) | 2019 | — (Note: "Heartless" did not enter the Billboard Hot 100, but peaked at number three on the Bubbling Under Hot 100 chart.) | — | — | — | — | — | — | — | — | — | RIAA: 3× Platinum; MC: 2× Platinum; RMNZ: Gold | The Goat |
| "Mood Ring" (Britney Spears) | 2020 | — (Note: "Mood Ring" did not chart in Billboard Hot 100, however it peaked at number 23 on Bubbling Under Hot 100 chart.) | — | — | — | — (Note: "Mood Ring" did not chart in Canadian Hot 100, however it peaked at number 32 on Canada Digital Song Sales.) | — | — | — | — | — (Note: "Mood Ring" did not chart in UK Singles Chart, however it peaked at number 18 on UK Download component chart.) | | Glory (2020 re-release) |
| "High Fashion" (Roddy Ricch featuring Mustard) | 2020 | 20 | 12 | — | 72 | 30 | — | 48 | — | — | 45 | RIAA: 4× Platinum; ARIA: Gold; BPI: Gold; MC: Platinum; RMNZ: Platinum | Please Excuse Me for Being Antisocial |
| "Late at Night" (Roddy Ricch featuring Mustard) | 2021 | 20 | 6 | — | 49 | 24 | — | 38 | — | — | 40 | BPI: Silver; RMNZ: Platinum | Live Life Fast |
| "DFMU" (Ella Mai) | 2022 | 85 | 22 | — | — | — | — | — | — | — | — | RIAA: Platinum | Heart on my Sleeve |
| "Not Like Us" (Kendrick Lamar) | 2024 | 1 | 1 | — | 9 | 2 | 54 | 11 | 6 | 18 | 10 | ARIA: 6× Platinum; BPI: 2× Platinum; BRMA: Platinum; MC: Platinum; RMNZ: 4× Platinum; SNEP: Diamond | Non-album single |
| "TV Off" (Kendrick Lamar featuring Lefty Gunplay) | 2024 | 2 | 1 | — | 12 | 7 | 26 | 5 | 5 | 19 | 6 | ARIA: Platinum; BPI: Gold; BRMA: Gold; RMNZ: Platinum | GNX |
"—" denotes releases that did not chart or were not released in that territory.

== 2010–2011 ==
=== YG - The Real 4Fingaz ===
- "Glowin" (featuring Reem Riches and Ty Dolla Sign)

=== Dom Kennedy - From the Westside with Love, II ===
- 03 "When I Come Around"

=== Lil Twist - The Golden Child ===
- "Getting Crazy"

=== Soulja Boy - Gold On Deck ===
- "Don't Sleep (featuring Young Lo)"
- "F.A.N."

=== Ty Dolla Sign - Hou$e on the Hill ===
- "All Star" (featuring Joe Mosees and DJ Mustard) (produced with Fuego)
- "Go Get It" (featuring Wiz Khalifa) (produced with Terrace Martin)

=== Ty Dolla Sign - Backup Drive, Vol. 1 ===
- "Overtime" (featuring YG and DJ Mustard)

=== Ty Dolla Sign - Backup Drive, Vol. 2 ===
- "Naughty" (featuring YG, Mann, Reem Riches and DJ Mustard) (produced with Traknox)

=== Tyga - #BitchImTheShit ===
- "Pop It"
- "In This Thing"

=== YG - Just Re'd Up ===
- "I'm Good"
- "Patty Cake" (featuring DJ Mustard)
- "Pillow Talking" (featuring Short Dawg)
- "Bitches Ain't Shit" (featuring Tyga and Nipsey Hussle)
- "Honestly"
- "I Got Bitches" (featuring Ty Dolla Sign and DJ Mustard)
- "Dippin N Sippin" (featuring Ty Dolla Sign and PC)

== 2012 ==
=== 2 Chainz - Based on a T.R.U. Story ===
- 06. "I'm Different" (produced with Mike Free)

=== DJ Drama - Quality Street Music ===
- 09. "Real Niggas In The Building" (featuring Travis Porter and Kirko Bangz)

=== Freddie Gibbs - Baby Face Killa ===
- 19. "Every City" (featuring YG)

=== French Montana - Mac and Cheese 3 ===
- 21. "Thrilla In Manilla" (featuring Tyga)

=== Joe Moses - From Nothing to Something ===
- 15. "Ratchets" (featuring Tyga)
  - "Ratchets (Remix)" (featuring The Game and Snoop Dogg)

=== Kid Ink - Rocketshipshawty ===
- 13. "Last Time"

=== Meek Mill ===
- 00. "I'm Rollin"

=== Problem - Welcome to Mollyworld ===
- 14. "T.O." (featuring Skeme)

=== Tyga - Careless World: Rise of the Last King ===
- 11. "Rack City"
  - "Rack City (Remix)" (featuring Wale, Fabolous, Young Jeezy, Meek Mill and T.I.)

=== Tyga - Well Done 3 ===
- 01. "No Luck"
- 10. "Ratchets" (featuring Joe Moses)

=== YG - 4 Hunnid Degreez ===
- 02. "I'ma Thug" (featuring Meek Mill)
- 04. "Cali Living" (featuring Dom Kennedy and Riko)
- 05. "Blunted" (featuring Casey Veggies and Shitty)
- 06. "Gangbang" (featuring TeeCee4800)
- 08. "Do It With My Tongue"
- 09. "Keenon Jackson" (featuring TeeCee4800)
- 10. "Take Everything From Her"
- 11. "Mess Around" (featuring Charley Hood)
- 12. "Yo Body"
- 13. "Go So Deep" (featuring Ty Dolla Sign and PC)
- 14. "She Don't Love Me" (featuring Ty Dolla Sign)
- 15. "Respect Her Hustle"
- 16. "Grindmode" (featuring Nipsey Hussle and 2 Chainz)
- 21. "God Is My Witness" (featuring Tanea)
- 22. "Westside 4 Fingaz" (featuring Reem Riches and Riko)

=== Ty Dolla Sign and Joe Moses - Whoop! ===
- 04. "T.O.P" (featuring Dusto (Relly Nation)
- 05. "Tricks" (featuring Kurupt)
- 08. "Weekend"
- 09. "The Man"
- 16. "Pass Her to the Homie" (featuring Yung)
- 17. "End Of Discussion" (featuring Reem Riches)

=== Young Jeezy - It's Tha World ===
- 08. "R.I.P." (featuring 2 Chainz)
  - R.I.P. (Remix) (featuring Kendrick Lamar, YG and Chris Brown)
  - R.I.P. (G-Mix) (featuring Snoop Dogg, Too $hort and E-40)
- 13. "All The Same" (featuring E-40)

=== Teyana Taylor - The Misunderstanding Of Teyana Taylor ===
- 06. "Bad Boy" (featuring Honey Cocaine)

=== TeeFlii - AnnieRUO'TAY ===
- 05. "This Dick"
- 14. "Celebrate"

=== Yowda - Fresh Out Da Pot ===
- 01. "Forgot That"
- 02. "She Knocks"
- 03. "Shut Up" (featuring YG)

=== Honey Cocaine - 90's Gold ===
- 00. "Thug Life Doe"

=== The Rej3ctz - CR33ZTAPE - RATED R ===
- 07. "Dance" (featuring YG, Kurupt, Daz of D.P.G)
- 08. "Player's Way" (featuring Too $hort)

=== Red Cafe - American Psycho ===
- 12. "Game Over"

=== Iamsu! - The Miseducation Of Iamsu! (Bonus Track) ===
- 00. "Facetime" (featuring Kool John)

=== TeeCee4800 - Loyalty Is Everything ===
- 04. Money

=== Reem Riches - Road 2 Reem Riches ===
- 03. "Strange"

=== G. Perico - Tha Innerprize ===
- 04. "Bustin" (featuring PC)

=== Antidote - Let It Blow ===
- 00. "Let It Blow"

=== Pink Dollaz - Pink Drugs ===
- 07. "Stuntin" (featuring Sean Mack)
- 10. "Ahhh"
- 11. "Bad Bitch"

=== E-40 - The Block Brochure: Welcome to the Soil 3 ===
- 19. "Over Here" (featuring Too Short and Droop-E) (Bonus Track)

== 2013 ==
=== Paul Wall - Checkseason ===
- 09. "Gettin Tho'd" (featuring Kid Ink and YG)

=== Tyga - Hotel California ===
- 05. "Hit 'Em Up" (featuring Jadakiss)

=== TeeFlii and DJ Mustard - Fireworks ===
- Full album

=== B.o.B - Underground Luxury ===
- 10. "HeadBand" (featuring 2 Chainz) (produced with Mike Free)

=== DJ Mustard - Ketchup ===
- 02. "Intro" (featuring Lil Snupe)
- 03. "Burn Rubber" (featuring Joe Moses and YG) (produced with DJ Official)
- 04. "4G's" (featuring TeeCee4800, E-40, Ty Dolla Sign and C. Hood)
- 05. "Take It To The Neck" (featuring Clyde Carson and YG)
- 06. "Put This Thang On Ya" (featuring Ty Dolla Sign) (produced with Ty Dolla Sign of D.R.U.G.S)
- 07. "Bounce That" (featuring Skeme, Casey Veggies, TeeCee4800, RJ and Royce The Choice)
- 08. "LadyKilla" (featuring Cocc Pistol Cree)
- 09. "Stupid Dumb" (featuring Bounce and Dorrough)
- 10. "Been From The Gang" (featuring Kay Ess, YG, Nipsey Hussle and RJ)
- 12. "Straight Ryder" (featuring Candice)
- 13. "Nothin Like Me" (featuring Dom Kennedy)
- 14. "Fuck That Nigga" (featuring Ty Dolla Sign, TeeFLii, Tory Lanez and Constantine)
- 16. "See Me Gettin’ Money" (featuring YG, Cash Out and K. Smith)
- 17. "Paranoid" (featuring Ty Dolla Sign and Joe Moses)
- 18. "CNN" (featuring Kid Ink)
- 19. "Don’t Trust Nobody" (featuring Killa Kam and RJ)
- 21. "Midnight Run" (featuring Royce The Choice, Skeme and Casey Veggies)

=== Dom Kennedy - Get Home Safely ===
- 18. "Nothin Like Me" (featuring DJ Mustard)

=== The Game - OKE: Operation Kill Everything ===
- 11. "Same Hoes" (featuring Nipsey Hussle and Ty Dolla Sign)

=== Kirko Bangz - Progression III ===
- 12. "Shirt By Versace" (featuring YG, French Montana, G Haze)

=== Ty Dolla Sign - Beach House 2 ===
- 03. "Paranoid" (featuring B.o.B)
- 12. "Dolla Sign" (featuring YG)

=== YG - Boss Yo Life Up Gang ===
- 04. "Shame On You" (featuring Nipsey Hussle and Payroll)
- 05. "Next Bitch" (featuring Doughboyz Cashout and Young Jeezy)
- 14. "Fuck You" (featuring Young Jeezy)

=== YG - Just Re'd Up 2 ===
- 02. "Im 4rm Bompton"
- 04. "Im A Real 1"
- 05. "This Yick" (featuring Dom Kennedy and Joe Moses)
- 06. "Make It Clap"
- 08. "Million" (producer with Mike Lee)
- 09. "Sprung" (featuring TeeFLii)
- 10. "I Wanna B Down" (producer with Nic Nack)
- 15. "You Broke" (featuring Nipsey Hussle)
- 16. "Gotta Get Dough" (featuring TeeCee4800)
- 18. "Fuck It" (featuring Reem Riches)
- 19. "B I T C H" (featuring D-Lo) (producer with Mike Lee)
- 20. "Dont Trust" (featuring Young Scooter)
- 21. "I Smoke I Drank" (featuring Beautiful April)
- 22. "I Like" (featuring Juicy J)
- 23. "I'll Do Ya" (featuring Ty Dolla Sign)

=== R. Kelly - Black Panties ===
- 11. "Spend That" (featuring Young Jeezy) (producer with Mike Free and R. Kelly)

=== Tyga - Well Done 4 ===
- 02. "Bang Out (featuring Eazy-E)"
- 14. "Throw It Up (with DJ Mustard)"

=== Bow Wow - GreenLight 5 ===
- 02. "Caked Up"
- 04. "We In Da Club"

=== RJ - O.M.M.I.O ===
- 03. "Ride Wit Me (produced with DJ Swish)"
- 04. "Shoulda Coulda" (featuring KayEss)
- 06. "Get It" (Feat TeeFlii)
- 23. "Dick N' Instructions"

=== Travis Porter - Mr Porter ===
- 02. "Goin Deep" (featuring Tyga)
- 12. "Nine Times Outta Ten" (featuring YG)
- 17. "Need One's"

=== TeeFlii - AnnieRUO'TAY 2 ===
- 04. "Sprung" (featuring YG)
- 06. "Pussy"
- 15. "A Thug (featuring Fattboxx)"

=== TeeCee4800 and Nano and Reem Riches - Mid-Town Money ===
- 02. "Nigga Get Off" (featuring RJ)
- 03. "Callin"
- 05. "Pop A Molly"
- 11. "Highlights"
- 13. "Let Me Hit It"
- 18. "4G'z" (featuring E-40, Ty Dolla Sign and Charley Hood)

=== Dorrough Music - Shut The City Down ===
- 11. "After Party"

=== Joe Moses - From Nothing To Something Vol. 2 ===
- 04. "Get Nekkid"
- 08. "Nothing To Something"
- 17. "Ratchets (Remix)" (featuring Tyga)

=== DJ Mustard ===
- 00. Money (featuring TeeCee4800)

=== will.I.am - #willpower ===
- 13. Feeling Myself (featuring Miley Cyrus, French Montana and Wiz Khalifa)

=== SNL ===
- 00. "Homies"

=== Legacy - Dolo ===
- 04. "Someone Young"

=== Young Jeezy ===
- 00. "The Homie" (featuring YG)

=== Young Lace - Bipolar ===
- 13. "Straight Gas" (featuring 504Yung and Privilege)

=== Reem Riches - Road To Reem Riches 2 ===
- 02. Money on my Mind (produced with Wizzo GMB)
- 17. Go Up (featuring Jay 305)

=== Charley Hood - G.P.G.O: Got Pimpin Goin On ===
- 15. Shawty (featuring DJ Mustard)

=== KayEss - Mollywater ===
- 12. "Been From The Gang" (featuring YG, Nipsey Hussle and RJ)

=== Ludacris - #IDGAF ===
- 04. "Helluva Night"

=== Tae Snap - Blue Flame ===
- 05. "Fa Da Dough" (featuring Problem)

=== S.L.A.M Squad - T.I.U. (Turn It Up) ===
- 00. "T.I.U. (Turn It Up)"

=== Young Dro - High Times ===
- 03. "Strong"

=== DxFresh ===
- 00. "Ciroc Shots" (featuring Rapper Kooh)

=== Chasen Dreams - The Takeover ===
07. "Turn Up"

Flo Rida

00. Rear View (featuring August Alsina)

T-Pain

00. "Up Down" (Do This All Day) (featuring B.o.B)

== 2014 ==
=== Kid Ink - My Own Lane ===
- 03. "Show Me" (featuring Chris Brown)
- 06. "Main Chick" (featuring Chris Brown)
- 09. "Rollin'"

=== Ty Dolla Sign - Beach House EP ===
- 02. "Paranoid" (featuring B.o.B)
- 03. "Paranoid (Remix)" (featuring Trey Songz, French Montana and DJ Mustard)
- 04. "Or Nah" (featuring Wiz Khalifa and DJ Mustard) (produced with Mickley Adam)

=== Alley Boy - Alley Shakur: The Soul of a Runaway Slave (Mixtape) ===
- 15. "Celebration" (featuring Yung Berg and Joe Moses)

=== Rick Ross - Mastermind ===
- 14. "Sanctified" (featuring Big Sean and Kanye West) (Additional vocals from Betty Wright) (produced with Kanye West, Mike Dean)

=== Plies - Da Last Real Nigga Left ===
- 16. "Baking Soda" (featuring Tyga)

=== YG - My Krazy Life ===
- 02. "BPT"
- 03. "I Just Wana Party (featuring Schoolboy Q and Jay Rock)
- 04. "Left, Right"
- 05. "Bicken Back Being Bool"
- 07. "My Nigga" (featuring Rich Homie Quan and Young Jeezy)
- 08. "Do It To Ya" (featuring TeeFLii) (produced with C-Ballin)
- 10. "Who Do You Love" (featuring Drake)
- 14. "Sorry Momma" (featuring Ty Dolla Sign) (produced with Terrace Martin)
- 15. "When I Was Gone" (featuring RJ, Tee Cee, Charlie Hood, Reem Riches and Slim 400)
- 16. "Bompton"
- 17. "My Nigga" (Remix) (featuring (featuring Lil Wayne, Nicki Minaj, Meek Mill and Rich Homie Quan)
- 18. "459" (featuring Natasha Mosley)

=== Jason Derulo - Talk Dirty ===
- 06. "Kama Sutra" (featuring Kid Ink)

=== August Alsina - Testimony ===
- 15. "Numb" (featuring B.o.B and Yo Gotti)

=== Jennifer Lopez - A.K.A. ===
- 16. "Girls" (featuring Tyga)

=== Trey Songz - Trigga ===
- 03. "Na Na"

=== RJ - Takin Niggas Beats ===
- 10. "How U Feel"

=== Gucci Mane and Young Thug - The Purple Album ===
- 07. "Riding Around" (featuring Young La and Dk)
- 10. "Umm Hmm" (featuring MPA Wicced)

=== Sir Michael Rocks - Banco ===
- 14. "Ain't Nothing Like" (featuring Chuck Inglish and Too Short)

=== DJ Mustard - 10 Summers ===
- 01. "Low Low" (featuring Nipsey Hussle, TeeCee and RJ)
- 02. "Ghetto Tales" (featuring Jay 305 and TeeCee)
- 03. "Throw Your Hood Up" (featuring Dom Kennedy, Royce and RJ)
- 04. "No Reason" (featuring YG, Jeezy, Nipsey Hussle, and RJ)
- 05. "Giuseppee" (featuring 2 Chainz and Jeezy and Yo Gotti)
- 06. "Face Down" (featuring Lil Wayne, Big Sean, YG and Boosie Badazz)
- 07. "Down On Me" (featuring 2Chainz and Ty Dolla Sign)
- 08. "Can't Tell Me Shit" (featuring IamSu! and AKAFrank)
- 09. Tinashe Checks In (Interlude)
- 10. "4 Digits" (featuring Fabolous and Eric Bellinger)
- 11. Ty Dolla Sign Checks In (Interlude)
- 12. "Deep" (featuring Rick Ross, Wiz Khalifa, TeeFlii)
- 13. "Vato" (featuring YG, Jeezy and Que)

=== Wiz Khalifa - Blacc Hollywood ===
- 15. "You and Your Friends" (featuring Snoop Dogg and Ty Dolla Sign)

=== Ty Dolla Sign - Sign Language ===
- 09. "Type of Shit I Hate" (featuring Fabolous and YG)

=== Young Thug - 1017 Thug 3: The Finale ===
- 08. "L.A Swag"

=== Young Scrap - Faded Ambition ===
- 11. "Love LA" (featuring DJ Mustard)
- 13. "Bust It Open" (featuring DJ Mustard)

=== Jeezy - Seen It All : The Autobiography ===
- 00. "Link Up" (featuring Beenie Man and Ty Dolla Sign) (Bonus Track)

=== Que - Can You Digg It? ===
- 07. "Rich Nigga Problems" (featuring 2 Chainz)

=== Tinashe - Aquarius ===
- 05. "2 On" (featuring Schoolboy Q) (produced with Redwine and DJ Marley Waters)

=== T.I. - Paperwork ===
- 07. "No Mediocre" (featuring Iggy Azalea)

=== Vell - Stay Down to Come Up (mixtape) ===
- 02. "Oakland" (featuring DJ Mustard)
- 03. "Can You Feel It ?" (featuring Samm)
- 07. "Run"
- 10. "Childish" (featuring Ty Dolla Sign; produced with Larry Jayy)
- 13. "D.O.A."
- 17. "Right Here"

=== Keyshia Cole - Point of No Return ===
- 09. "She"

=== Mila J - M.I.L.A. ===
- 01. "My Main" (featuring Ty Dolla Sign)

=== Tinashe ===
- 00. "Fuckin with Me"

=== Omarion - Sex Playlist ===
- 02. "Post to Be" (featuring Chris Brown and Jhene Aiko)

=== YG - Blame It on the Streets ===
- 04. "Ride with Me" (featuring RJ and Nipsey Hussle)
- 09. "2015 Flow"

=== Nipsey Hussle - Mailbox Money ===
- 07. "Where Yo Money At?" (featuring Pacman)

=== Aka Frank - Legend EP ===
- 02. "Real One" (featuring London)
- 04. "Can't Tell Me Shit" (featuring Iamsu!)

=== Riff Raff - Neon Icon ===
- 12. "How to Be the Man"

=== DJ Mustard ===
- 00. "Vato" (featuring Que, YG and Jeezy)

=== Mikey oOo and JoJoe ===
- 00. "On My Clock" (featuring TeeFlii and DJ Mustard)

=== Slim 400 - Keepin It 400 ===
- 06. "Where the Party At?" (featuring TeeFlii)

=== Kiki Rowe - Kiki Rowe ===
- 02. "Trust Issues"

=== Yowda - Free El Chapo ===
- 10. "Bitch I Got It" (featuring Shorty T, Sav L)
- 13. "Forgot That" (featuring Tracy T)

=== Young Offishall ===
- 00. "Turnt"

=== Eric Statz ===
- 00. "Been Hit"
- 00. "Swoop" (featuring DJ Mustard)

=== Young Lawless - NAR F-TS ===
- 05. "Summer Time" (featuring Ty Dolla Sign and Kam Parker)

=== Ray Casino ===
- 00. "Thuggin"

=== Meek Mill ===
- 00. "She Don't Know" (featuring Ty Dolla Sign)

=== The HoodStarz - 56 Months ===
- 11. "Handle That" (featuring Clyde Carson and Show Banga)

=== Alexa Goddard - Marilyn ===
- 02. "Pretty Girls" (featuring DJ Mustard)

=== Rich City Lil Tae ===
- 00. "Polo" (featuring Lil Cyko)

=== David Cash - Escape: The Revenge of the Slappers ===
- 03. "Chevy (Remix)" (featuring E-40, Problem and Clyde Carson)
- 04. "Bumper"

=== iShowOff ===
- 00. "Ain't Built for This" (featuring Sean Kingston)

=== Jamie Foxx ===
- 00. "Party Ain't a Party" (featuring 2 Chainz)

=== Tory Lanez - Conflicts of my Soul: The 416 Story ===
- 11. "Know What's Up / The Take (featuring Kirko Bangz)" (produced with Tory Lanez and Xaphoon Jones)

=== Rihanna ===
- 00. "FourFiveSeconds" (DJ Mustard Remix)

=== Compton World - The Function ===
- 01. "Everyday"
- 02. "7-11"
- 03. "Domino"
- 04. "Goin Up"
- 05. "My Niggaz"
- 07. "Where The Party At" (featuring Stacey Lee)
- 08. "Tonite" (featuring Stacey Lee)
- 09. "Sum 'Mo Wit It" (featuring Slim 400)
- 10. "Swerve"

=== Bobby Brackins ===
- 00. "Hot Box" (DJ Mustard Remix)

=== N$ ===
- 00. "Wussap" (featuring Crooked I and DJ Mustard) (produced with Kenny Stevens)

=== Travis Porter ===
- 00. "I Need Ones (Remix) (with Ben J)

=== Earl Swavey - Yurple Rain ===
- 03. "Yurple Rain" (featuring DJWorm2G)
- 09. "Give It To You" (featuring Extindo Gang)

=== KSnS ===
- 00. "Drop It"

=== Bluejay ===
- 00. "My Team" (featuring DJ Mustard)

=== Famous Uno ===
- 00. "Switch" (featuring DJ Mustard)

=== D. Hawk ===
- 00. "Don't Wanna Be A Player No More"

=== Swish ===
- 00. "All The Way"

=== Ko$$ ===
- 00. "For Dem Bandz"

=== Clyde Carson - Playboy ===
- 03. "Bring 'Em Out"
- 06. "Back It Up" (featuring August Alsina)

=== Lashawn's Away - Trilluminati ===
- 04. "Better Know" (featuring TeeFlii)

=== Extindo Gang - Up in Smoke Vol. 1 ===
- 03. "Get On" (featuring Too $hort and Hitta J3)

=== Shabere ===
- 00. "Can't Tell"

=== Elway - Come Get This Work 2 ===
- 08. "Love These Hoes" (featuring Banc Cali and Av LMKR)

=== Cocc Pistol Cree - Postpar2m ===
- 05. "Lady Killa"

=== Alja Kamilton ===
- 00. "Tip Of Yo Tongue"

=== Done Deal - Western Hospitality XVI ===
- 12. "Realest" (featuring Av LMKR and AD Da Loc)

=== Jay Lyriq ===
- 00. "Money" (featuring Joe Young and Shorty Mack)

=== Master P ===
- 00. "What The Business Is" (featuring Clyde Carson and Eastwood)

=== Usher ===
- 00. "Or Nah"

=== Christian ===
00. "What it is"

== 2015 ==
=== Gucci Mane - Mr Clean, The Middle Man ===
- 10. "Vampire"

=== Kid Ink - Full Speed ===
- 07. "Be Real" (featuring Dej Loaf; produced with J Gramm and Twice as Nice)
- 10. "About Mine" (featuring Trey Songz; produced with Twice as Nice)

=== TeeFLii - Starr ===
- 12. "24 Hours" (featuring 2 Chainz)

=== Big Sean - Dark Sky Paradise ===
- 04. "I Don't Fuck with You" (featuring E-40; produced with Kanye West)
- 09. "I Know" (featuring Jhene Aiko)
- 10. "Deep" (featuring Lil Wayne)

=== Tyga and Chris Brown - Fan of a Fan: The Album ===
- 02. "Nothin Like Me" (featuring Ty Dolla Sign)
- 16. "Banjo"

=== Dok2 ===
- 04. "Multillionaire"

=== Ty Dolla Sign - Free TC ===
- 03. "Saved" (featuring E-40)
- 13. "Only Right" (featuring TeeCee4800, YG and Joe Moses)

=== Jamie Foxx - Hollywood : A Story of a Dozen Roses ===
- 17. "Pretty Thing"

=== Jessie J ===
- 00. "Sorry to Interrupt" (featuring Jhene Aiko and Rixton)

=== Krept and Konan - The Long Way Home ===
- 11. "Freak of the Week" (featuring Jeremih)

=== RJ - O.M.M.I.O 2 ===
- 04. "Dance With Me" (featuring Dom Kennedy)
- 06. "Hoes Come Easy"
- 07. "Comfortable"
- 08. "Watch What You Say"
- 16. "Just Might Let Her"
- 17. "Difference"
- 19. "Gudda" (featuring Plies and Jay 305)

=== RJ and Choice - Rich Off Mackin ===
- 01. "Intro"
- 03. "Playin Tricks" (produced with DJ Swish)
- 04. "Favor For Flavor" (featuring Splacc)
- 05. "Fuck Wit Yall" (featuring Leswood)
- 06. "Do It" (featuring Terrace Martin)
- 11. "I Just Came To Play" (featuring Shaun Sloan)
- 13. "Just Might" (featuring Que)
- 15. "Value"

=== DJ Mustard - 10 Summers : The Mixtape Vol.1 ===
- 01. "Intro" (featuring RJ, Big Mike and Choice)
- 02. "Body Count" (featuring RJ and Skeme, Co-Prod with Larry Jayy)
- 04. "Shooters" (featuring The Game, RJ, Skeme and Joe Moses, Co-Prod with Larry Jayy)
- 05. "Tool" (featuring TeeCee4800 and Jay 305)
- 06. "Trippin Off Hoes" (featuring RJ and Choice)
- 07. "You Know It" (featuring Nef The Pharaoh, Splacc and Big Mike)
- 08. "I Be Wit" (featuring Choice)
- 09. "All About You" (featuring TeeFlii, Choice and Casey Veggies)
- 11. "Broke Boy" (featuring IamSu!, Choice and RJ)
- 12. "Overdose" (featuring TeeFlii, IamSu! and Choice)
- 14. "Mr Big Bank Budda" (featuring DrakeO)
- 15. "Ice Cream" (featuring Dom Kennedy and Ty Dolla Sign)
- 16. "Love" (featuring Justine Skye)
- 17. "Down Love" (featuring TeeFlii)

=== IamSu! - Eyes On Me ===
- 02. "Nothin Less"

=== King Los - God Money War ===
- 08. "Can't Fade Us" (featuring Ty Dolla Sign)

=== Eric Bellinger - Cuffing Season ===
- 02. "You Can Have The Hoes" (featuring Boosie Badazz)

=== Nelly ===
- 00. "The Fix" (featuring Jeremih)

=== TeeCee4800 - Realness Over Millions ===
- 01. "Gettin 2 It" (featuring Ty Dolla Sign and RJ)
- 08. "Tool" (featuring Jay 305)
- 09. "7 In The Mornin"
- 14. "25 To Life"

=== Hurricane Chris - Hurricane Season ===
- 03. "Sections" (featuring Ty Dolla Sign)
- 16. "Breakin Her Back"

=== The Game - The Documentary 2 ===
- 2–14. "My Flag / Da Homies" (featuring Ty Dolla Sign, Jay 305, AD, Mitchy Slick, Joe Moses, RJ and Skeme)

=== Joe Moses - Brackin ===
- 10. "Is You Down" (featuring Kevin McCall)

=== Gunplay - Living Legend ===
- 06. "Wuzhanindoe" (featuring YG)

=== Young Sam - Trapfornia 2 ===
- 08. "We Know It" (featuring Joe Moses)

=== Vell ===
- 00. "Ain't Yo Brother"

=== Ester Dean - Miss Ester Dean ===
- 06. "New Shit"

=== DrakeO The Ruler - I Am Mr Mosely ===
- 02. "Gone In 60 Seconds"
- 06. "Mr Big Bank Budda"

=== MustardMayo ===
- 00. Got U (featuring Marc E.Bassy, Iamsu! and Symba)

=== T-Pain ===
- 00. "Make That Shit Work" (featuring Juicy J)

=== iLoveMakonnen - I Love Makonnen 2 ===
- 03. "Second Chance"

=== K Kutta ===
- 03. "Nascar Money" (featuring Flo Rida)

=== Choice - By Choice Not Force ===
- 01. "I Be Wit"
- 02. "Move Around" (featuring RJ)
- 03. "Everything New"
- 04. "SportCenter"
- 07. "Catch Me If You Can" (featuring DrakeO The Ruler)

=== Yellow Claw - Blood For Mercy ===
- 05. "In My Room" (featuring DJ Mustard, Ty Dolla Sign and Tyga)

=== Kid Ink ===
- 00. "Lie To Kick It" (featuring Ty Dolla Sign and Bricc Baby)

=== DJ Mustard - NBA 2K16 Soundtrack ===
- 00. "Ball At Night" (Instrumental)
- 00. "You Don't Want It" (featuring RJ)

=== Jeremih - Late Nights ===
- 12. "Don't Tell 'Em" (featuring YG)
- 00. "Peace Sign" (featuring Fabolous and Red Cafe) (Leftover)

=== Rick Ross - Black Market ===
- 11. "Peace Sign" (additional vocals by Red Cafe and Jeremih)

=== Trey Songz - To Whom It May Concern ===
- 08. "Stuck"

=== Tayf3rd ===
- 00. "Too Fast For You" (produced with Groovy Jose)

=== Joelle James ===
- 00. "Rookie Of The Year"

=== Fat Trel - SDMG ===
- 16. "That's Life" (featuring YG)

=== The Game ===
- 00. "Freakshow" (featuring Ed Sheeran)

=== M.I.C - A.W.A.P (All Work All Play) ===
- 03. "G Thang" (featuring Rayven Justice) (produced with The DreemTeam)

=== Joe Moses - From Nothing 2 Something 3 ===
- 03. "Mr Get Dough"
- 07. "Lit" (featuring Ty Dolla Sign)

=== Young Scooter - Jug Season ===
- 07. "All With Me" (featuring Casino)

=== Kid Ink - Summer in the Winter ===
- 01. "Bunny Ranch"
- 02. "Real Recognize"
- 03. "Promise" (featuring Fetty Wap)
- 04. "Rewind" (featuring Akon)
- 06. "Same Day"
- 08. "Summer In The Winter" (featuring Omarion)
- 10. "That's On You"
- 11. "Time Out"

=== Jay 305 - Inner City Hero ===
- 13. "Thuggin'" (featuring Joe Moses)

=== Salty ===
- 00. "Bando" (featuring Iamsu! and G Val)

=== Jordin Sparks - Right Here Right Now ===
- 14. "It Ain't You"

=== iShowOff ===
- 00. "I Remember It All"

=== SmokeOne - #FreeSmokeOne ===
- 03. "Let That Bitch Go" (featuring RJ)

=== Ty Dolla Sign - Airplane Mode ===
- 03. "Rich Ni$$a" (featuring YG) (produced with Twice As Nice)
- 09. "Money Ruin Friendships" (featuring Joe Moses)

=== Fresco ===
- 00. "Popular" (featuring DJ Mustard)
- 00. "Popular" (Remix) (featuring RJ and DJ Mustard)

=== Ty Dolla Sign - Free TC ===
- 18. "Wavy (featuring Joe Moses)"
- 20. "Westside"

=== Migos ===
- 00. "Look at My Dab" (DJ Mustard and 4B Remix)

=== DJ Mustard ===
- 00. "Why'd You Call" (featuring Ty Dolla Sign and iLoveMakonnen)

=== Cashmere Cat and DJ Mustard ===
- 00. "Ice Rink"

=== Zhu, DJ Snake and DJ Mustard ===
- 00. "Faded 2.0"

=== Beyoncé ===
- 00. "7/11" (DJ Mustard Remix) (produced with DJ Freedo, Ricky Mears and DJ Iknoso)

=== Cam and China ===
- 00. "Nada"

=== Mistah FAB - S.T.F.K. 2 ===
- 07. "None Of Y'all"

=== N.O.R.E. ===
- 00. "We Don't (featuring Rick Ross, Ty Dolla Sign and City Boy Dee)

=== Posse ===
- 00. "Ride Or Die" (featuring Lil Yase and Yatta)

=== Infinity ===
- 00. "Bright Lights" (featuring DJ Beamon)

=== Rayven Justice - The Cassette Playlist ===
- 04. Tucked Off

=== Commence ===
- 00. "In This"

=== Kid Demigod ===
- 00. "California Street Dream" (produced with Jose Frenchie)

=== Gmomo - Spazzing Out Vol. 1: Lost Identity ===
- 04. "Stay Gettin Tatted" (featuring Young Sam and DJ Mustard)

=== Galantis ===
- 00. "Runaway" (DJ Mustard Remix)

=== Mr Capone-E ===
- 00. "Loco" (featuring Migos and Mally Mall)

=== JR Castro ===
- 00. "Get Home" (featuring Kid Ink and Migos)

=== Ben Harris ===
- 00. "Dat Ass Doe"

=== Jim Jones ===
- 00. "Gang" (featuring T-Rav and Neek Bucks)

=== Da Illest ===
- 00. "Fire" (featuring Mila J)

=== Indian Blue - Million Dollar Dreams ===
- 05. "No Reason" (featuring Slim 400)
- 07. "Fucc Yo Bitch" (featuring YG and Juvenile)

== 2016 ==
=== DJ Mustard ===
- 00. "Whole Lotta Lovin'" (featuring Travis Scott)

=== Tinashe ===
- 00. "Secret"
- 00. "They're On"

=== Ella Mai - Time EP ===
- Full album

=== Ella Mai ===
- 00. "No Rush"

=== Ty Dolla Sign ===
- 00. "Bang My Line"

=== Kid Ink ===
- 00. "Rounds" (featuring Fabolous and Jeremih)

=== Rihanna - Anti ===
- 07. "Needed Me"

=== Bonnie McKee ===
- 00. "Tough Enough"

=== Trinidad James ===
- 00. "Just a Lil' Thick (She Juicy)" [featuring Mystikal and Lil Dicky]

=== Sean Paul ===
- 00. "Tell Dem Again"

=== A$AP Ferg - Always Strive and Prosper ===
- 03. "Strive" (featuring Missy Elliott) (produced with Stelios Phili)

=== Eric Statz ===
- 00. "Hide Girl" (featuring DJ Mustard)
- 00. "Hide Girl 2" (featuring DJ Mustard)
- 00. "Hide Girl 3" (featuring DJ Mustard)

=== Travis Scott ===
- 00. "Party Till"

=== Luce Cannon ===
- 00. "Watch Me"

=== Teyana Taylor ===
- 00. "Freak On" (featuring Chris Brown)

=== Wale - Summer on Sunset ===
- 04. "Thought It" (featuring Ty Dolla Sign and Joe Moses)

=== Joe Moses - Live 4rom the 5ive ===
- 10. "To a Boss" (featuring Ty Dolla Sign)

=== DJ Esco - Project E.T (Esco Terrestrial) ===
- 01. "Projet E.T Intro"
- 11. "Stupidly Crazy" (featuring Casey Veggies and Nef the Pharaoh)

=== G-Eazy ===
- 00. "In the Meantime" (featuring Quavo)

=== Rae Sremmurd - SremmLife 2 ===
- 07. "Set The Roof" (featuring Lil Jon) (produced with Mike Will Made It and HighDefRazjah)

=== Britney Spears - Glory ===
- 13. "Mood Ring" (2020 reissue bonus track)

=== Ty Dolla Sign - Campaign ===
- 13. "Pu$$y" (featuring Trey Songz and Wiz Khalifa) (produced with Allen Ritter)

=== DJ Mustard - Cold Summer ===
- 1. "Been a Long Time" (featuring YG and Ty Dolla Sign) (produced with Twice as Nice)
- 2. "Ridin' Around" (featuring Nipsey Hussle and RJ)
- 3. "Want Her" (featuring Quavo and YG)
- 4. "Dope Boy" (featuring O.T. Genasis and Jeezy) (produced with Larry Jayy)
- 5. "Know My Name" (featuring Rich the Kid and RJ)
- 6. "Lil Baby" (featuring Ty Dolla Sign) (produced with Rance)
- 7. "Shake That Ass" (featuring TeeCee4800 and K Camp) (produced with Christopher Sanders)
- 8. "Don't Hurt Me" (featuring Nicki Minaj and Jeremih) (produced with Twice as Nice)
- 9. "Party" (featuring Young Thug and YG)
- 10. "Main Bitch" (featuring RJ)
- 11. "What These Bitches Want" (featuring Meek Mill, Nipsey Hussle and Ty Dolla Sign) (produced with Terrace Martin)
- 12. "10,000 Hours" (featuring Ella Mai) (produced with J-Holt)
- 13. "Another Summer" (featuring Rick Ross, John Legend and James Fauntleroy) (produced with Rance, Cardiak and Focus)

=== Kiki Rowe ===
- 00. “Trust Issues”

=== Post Malone - Stoney ===
- 02. "Big Lie" (produced with Twice as Nice)

== 2017 ==
=== Ashanti ===
- "Say Less" (feat. Ty $)

=== A Boogie wit da Hoodie - The Bigger Artist ===
- 09. "Somebody" (featuring Don Q)

=== Big Sean - I Decided. ===
- 08. "Owe Me" (produced with Travis Scott and Amaire Johnson)

=== Kacy Hill - Like a Woman ===
- 01. "Like a Woman"

=== Meek Mill - Wins and Losses ===
- 04. "Whatever You Need" (featuring Chris Brown and Ty Dolla Sign) (produced with James Royo and Rance)

=== Demi Lovato - Tell Me You Love Me ===
- 08. "Lonely" (featuring Lil Wayne) (Vocal production by Mitch Allan; additional vocal production by Scott Robinson)

=== Ella Mai - Ready EP ===
- Full album

=== 21 Savage - Issa Album ===
- 07. "FaceTime" (produced with Twice as Nice)

=== Bebe Rexha ===
- 00. "Naughty"

=== RJ - Mr. LA ===
- 02. Blammer (co-produced with Authentic)
- 03. Brackin (co-produced with Authentic and Larry J)
- 05. Thank God (feat. Blac Youngsta)
- 08. 2 Grown
- 09. Is It Mine (feat. Ty Dolla $ign)
- 13. Nobody (co-produced with FeezyDisABangah)

=== DJ Mustard and RJ - The Ghetto ===
- Full album

== 2018 ==
=== Comethazine - BAWK$EE ===
- 15. Sticks out the Window

=== SOB x RBE - GANGIN ===
- 05. Can't

=== Lil Dicky ===
- 00. "Freaky Friday" (featuring Chris Brown) (additional vocals from Ed Sheeran, DJ Khaled, and Kendall Jenner) (Co-produced with Cashmere Cat)

=== Peewee Longway - State of the Art ===
- 15. "Tapper Gon Be a Trapper" (feat. Quavo & Offset)

=== YG - Stay Dangerous ===
- 01. - "10 Times"
- 04. - "Suu Whoop" (co-produced with Jordan Holt)
- 05. - "Cant Get in Kanada" (co-produced with Official)
- 06. - "Too Cocky"
- 07. - "Big Bank"
- 08. - "Power" (co-produced with Citoonthebeat)
- 09. - "Slay"
- 11. - "Too Brazy" (co-produced with Citoonthebeat)
- 14. - "Free the Homies Interlude"
- 15. - "Bomptown Finest"

=== Belly ===
- 00. - "4 Days" (Featuring YG)

=== Cardi B - Invasion of Privacy ===
- 11. - "She Bad" (Featuring YG) (co-produced with DJ Official)

=== Mariah Carey - Caution ===
- 02. - "With You"

=== Lil Wayne - Tha Carter V ===
- 16. - "Open Safe"

== 2019 ==
=== Mustard and Migos ===
- 02. - "Pure Water"

=== 2 Chainz - Rap or Go to the League ===
- 11. "2 Dollar Bill" (feat. E-40 & Lil Wayne)

=== 03 Greedo - Still Summer in the Projects ===
- Full album

=== YG - 4Real 4Real ===
- 02. "Bottle Service" (produced with Cubeatz)
- 03. "In the Dark"
- 04. "Go Loko"
- 06. "I Was on the Block"

=== Mustard - Perfect Ten ===
- Full album

=== Young Thug - So Much Fun ===
- 18. "Boy Back" (featuring Nav)

=== Snoop Dogg - I Wanna Thank Me ===
- 08. "Blue Face Hunnids" (feat. YG)

=== Roddy Ricch - Please Excuse Me for Being Antisocial ===
- 11. "High Fashion" (feat. Mustard)

== 2020 ==
=== Big Sean - Detroit 2 ===
- 14. "Time In" (feat. Twenty88)

=== Nav - Good Intentions ===
- 15. "Did You Wrong"

=== Pop Smoke - Shoot for the Stars, Aim for the Moon ===
- 11. "West Coast Shit" (featuring Tyga and Quavo)

=== Ty Dolla $ign - Featuring Ty Dolla $ign ===
- 13. "Real Life" (featuring Roddy Ricch and Mustard)
- 15. "By Yourself" (featuring Jhené Aiko and Mustard)
- 21. "Everywhere"

=== Megan Thee Stallion - Good News ===
- 11. "Intercourse" (featuring Popcaan and Mustard)

== 2021 ==
=== Roddy Ricch - Live Life Fast ===
- 1. "Late at Night"

== 2022 ==
=== Vince Staples - Ramona Park Broke My Heart ===
- 04. "Magic"
- 13. "Bang That"

=== Lil Uzi Vert - Red and White ===
- 8. "GLOCK IN MY PURSE" (produced with COLBYYT)

=== Unc & Phew - Only Built for Infinity Links ===
- 5. "See Bout It"

=== Ty $ & Mustard ===
- "My Friends" (feat. Lil Durk) {produced with FNZ, Nic Mac & Waterboy}

== 2023 ==
=== Blxst - Just for Clarity 2 ===
- 01. "Ghetto Cinderella" (feat. Mustard & Terrace Martin) (produced with Unknown Nick & Luis Huighs)

=== Swifty Blue & Joe Peshi ===
- 01. "Juggling" (feat. Mustard & BSG)

=== Jay Rock & Anderson .Paak ===
- "Too Fast (Pull Over)" (featuring Latto) (produced with GYLTTYRP)

== 2024 ==
=== ¥$ (Kanye West and Ty Dolla Sign) - Vultures 1 ===
- 07. "Do It" (featuring YG)
  (produced with Ye, Ty Dolla Sign, Aver Ray, Camper, Chrishan, DTP, Lukasbl and The Legendary Traxster)

=== Kendrick Lamar ===
- "Not Like Us" (produced with Sounwave & Momberger)

==== GNX ====
- "TV Off" (produced with Sounwave, Antonoff, Momberger)
- ”Hey Now” (produced with Sounwave, Antonoff)

=== Mustard - Faith of a Mustard Seed ===
- Full album

=== YG - Just Re'D Up 3 ===
- 01. "Go Brazy" (feat. Mustard & Baby Stone Gorillas)
- 02. "Right Now"
- 15. "Lover Make" (produced with Jay Wavvy & Larry Jayy)
- 00. "I'm in Love"

=== Ella Mai - 3 ===
- Full EP
