= 100 Bands =

2019 single by Mustard

Single by Mustard featuring Quavo, 21 Savage, YG and Meek Mill

from the album Perfect Ten
- Released: May 10, 2019
- Genre: Hip hop; trap
- Length: 2:59 (single version); 2:15 (album version)
- Label: 10 Summers Records; Interscope
- Songwriter(s): Dijon McFarlane; Quavious Marshall; Shéyaa Bin Abraham-Joseph; Keenon Jackson; Robert Williams; Leslie Wakefield, Jr.
- Producer(s): Mustard

Mustard singles chronology
"Pure Water" (2019)	"100 Bands" (2019)	"Ballin'" (2019)

Quavo singles chronology
"Bacc At It Again" (2019)	"100 Bands" (2019)	"In da Trap" (2019)

21 Savage singles chronology
"Monster" (2019)	"100 Bands" (2019)	"Floating" (2019)

YG singles chronology
"Go Loko" (2019)	"100 Bands" (2019)	"Feel Up" (2019)

Meek Mill singles chronology
"Tap" (2019)	"100 Bands" (2019)	"You Stay" (2019)

Music video
- 100 Bands on YouTube

"100 Bands" is a song by American record producer Mustard featuring American rappers Quavo, 21 Savage, YG and Meek Mill. It was released as the second single from Mustard's third studio album, Perfect Ten, on May 10, 2019. It was produced by Mustard and co-produced by the late Official, who is uncredited.

The album version omits 21 Savage's verse. The song appeared on the soundtrack for the 2019 racing video game Need for Speed Heat.

== Charts ==
Chart performance for "100 Bands"
Chart (2019)	Peak position
New Zealand Hot Singles (RMNZ)	29
US Bubbling Under Hot 100 Singles (Billboard)	25

== Certifications ==
Certifications for "100 Bands"
Region	Certification	Certified units/sales
United States (RIAA)	Gold	500,000^{‡}
^{‡} Sales+streaming figures based on certification alone.
