= Baguettes in the Face =

2019 song by Mustard featuring Nav, Playboi Carti, and A Boogie wit da Hoodie

Song by Mustard featuring Nav, Playboi Carti, and A Boogie wit da Hoodie

from the album Perfect Ten
- Released: June 28, 2019
- Genre: Trap
- Length: 2:54
- Label: 10 Summers; Interscope
- Songwriters: Dijon McFarlane; Navraj Goraya; Jordan Carter; Artist Dubose; Larry Sanders
- Producers: Mustard; Larry Jayy (co.); Geronimo

"Baguettes in the Face" is a song by American record producer Mustard featuring Canadian rapper Nav and American rappers Playboi Carti and A Boogie wit da Hoodie. Written by the artists alongside co-producer Larry Jayy, it was released through 10 Summers and Interscope Records as the fourth track from Mustard's third studio album, Perfect Ten, on June 28, 2019.

== Background and composition ==
The song is an anthem that sees the three rappers boasting about their expensive jewelry and women that they want to be with, but they cannot handle them because of their hedonism. Nav handles most of the song by rapping the chorus and first verse, and Playboi Carti on the second verse and then A Boogie wit da Hoodie being on the third verse.

While interviewed by Carl Lamarre of Billboard on July 9, 2019, Mustard was asked about his favorite collaboration on the album. First, Mustard and Nav were working on "Baguettes in the Face" in the studio, and Mustard was also talking to Nav's manager Cash, wanting Nav to appear on the song, also telling him that he is a fan of Nav and his music. Mustard also stated that his intention for the collaboration was "being the first guy" that had Nav rapping on "an uptempo beat" as he claimed that he has "never heard him on one". When the two were working together, Mustard played Nav some beats that the latter usually uses on his own music, but Nav instead wanted to try on a Mustard-type instrumental, so Mustard played him a new one and Nav tried it. After Nav recorded his vocals on the song, Mustard liked it and sent the then-unfinished song to Playboi Carti and A Boogie wit da Hoodie, who sent their respective verses back. When Mustard was questioned about what made Nav stand out to him, he praised Nav's voice and called it "incredible", bringing up Nav's 2019 single "Tap" for an example. Mustard also brought up his collaboration with the American hip hop trio Migos on their joint early 2019 single "Pure Water", the lead single from the same album, referencing a line that Quavo from the group used in the first verse, "Give me the beat and I'll ride it like a jetski". Furtherly explaining, Mustard said that he did not understand where the line came from and why it was used, stating that Nav is the same way, and he wants his beats to have "a different sound".

== Critical reception ==
The song received mostly positive reviews from critics, with Nav's feature receiving particular praise. Contrary, Scott Glaysher of HipHopDX panned the song, calling it a "snooze fest" and saying the song "could have very well been created in a streaming service algorithm lab."

== Charts ==
Chart performance for "Baguettes in the Face"
| Chart (2019) | Peak position |
|---|---|
| Canada Hot 100 (Billboard) | 47 |
| New Zealand Hot Singles (RMNZ) | 18 |
| US Billboard Hot 100 | 81 |
| US Hot R&B/Hip-Hop Songs (Billboard) | 33 |
| US Rolling Stone Top 100 | 39 |

== Certifications ==
Certifications for "Baguettes in the Face"
| Region | Certification | Certified units/sales |
|---|---|---|
| Brazil (Pro-Música Brasil) | Gold | 20,000^{‡} |
| New Zealand (RMNZ) | Platinum | 30,000^{‡} |
| United Kingdom (BPI) | Silver | 200,000^{‡} |
| United States (RIAA) | Platinum | 1,000,000^{‡} |
^{‡} Sales+streaming figures based on certification alone.
