= Major Distribution =

Major Distribution may refer to:

- "Major Distribution" (50 Cent song)
- "Major Distribution" (Drake and 21 Savage song)
