= Pop It =

Pop It may refer to:

- "Pop It", a song by Sidney Bechet, 1939
- "Pop It", a song by rapper YG (see DJ Mustard production discography)
- "Pop It", a song by Lil Wayne, 2007
- Pop-It, a fidget toy
