= Get Home =

Get Home may refer to:

- "Get Home" (JR Castro song) (2015)
- "Get Home", a song by Sarah Slean from The Baroness (2008)
- "Get Home", a song by Bastille from Bad Blood (2013)
- "Get Home", a song by Angus & Julia Stone from Angus & Julia Stone (2014)
