= Go Loko =

Single by YG featuring Tyga and Jon Z

from the album 4Real 4Real
- Language: English; Spanish
- Released: May 3, 2019
- Genre: Trap
- Length: 5:04: 4:02 (radio edit)
- Label: Def Jam
- Songwriters: Keenon Jackson; Dijon MacFarlane; Shah Rukh Zaman Khan; Michael Stevenson; Jonathan Resto Quiñones
- Producers: Mustard and GYLTTRYP

YG singles chronology
"Stop Snitchin" (2019)	"Go Loko" (2019)	"100 Bands" (2019)

Tyga singles chronology
"Light It Up" (2019)	"Go Loko" (2019)	"Haute" (2019)

Jon Z singles chronology
"Después Que Te Perdí" (2019)	"Go Loko" (2019)	"Ya No Eres Mia" (2019)

Music video
- "Go Loko" on YouTube

"Go Loko" is a song by American rapper YG featuring fellow American rapper Tyga and Puerto Rican rapper Jon Z. It was released as the second single from YG's album 4Real 4Real on May 3, 2019. The music video was released alongside the song. It debuted at number 71 on the US Billboard Hot 100 before peaking at number 49.

== Live performances ==
The artists performed the song on Jimmy Kimmel Live! on May 6. The three also performed the song on The Ellen DeGeneres Show on May 23, with accompaniment from a mariachi band. The latter show did not censor any Spanish profanities in Jon Z's verse during its initial broadcast, despite the English profanities being sufficiently censored. This resulted in The Ellen DeGeneres Show removing the performance video from their website 24 hours later.

== Charts ==
=== Weekly charts ===
Chart (2019)	Peak position
Australia (ARIA)	41
Austria (Ö3 Austria Top 40)	74
Belgium (Ultratip Bubbling Under Flanders)	21
Canada Hot 100 (Billboard)	30
Germany (GfK)	65
Hungary (Stream Top 40)	29
Ireland (IRMA)	65
Latvia (LAIPA)	24
Lithuania (AGATA)	28
New Zealand (Recorded Music NZ)	15
Slovakia Singles Digital (ČNS IFPI)	55
Sweden Heatseeker (Sverigetopplistan)	1
Switzerland (Schweizer Hitparade)	36
US Billboard Hot 100	49
US Hot R&B/Hip-Hop Songs (Billboard)	16
US Rhythmic Airplay (Billboard)	7
US Rolling Stone Top 100	34

=== Year-end charts ===
Chart (2019)	Position
Canada (Canadian Hot 100)	92
US Hot R&B/Hip-Hop Songs (Billboard)	45
US Rhythmic (Billboard)	33

== Certifications ==
Region	Certification	Certified units/sales
Portugal (AFP)	Gold	5,000^{‡}
United States (RIAA)	2× Platinum	2,000,000^{‡}
^{‡} Sales+streaming figures based on certification alone.
