= 4Real 4Real =

2019 studio album by YG

Studio album by YG
- Released: May 24, 2019
- Genres: Hip hop; West Coast hip hop
- Length: 47:07
- Labels: 4Hunnid; Def Jam
- Producers: 1-O.A.K.; Corbett; Cronkite; Cubeatz; GYLTTRYP; Hit-Boy; Musik MajorX; Mustard; Swish; Tariq Beats; TnTXD; Yung Tago

YG chronology
Stay Dangerous (2018)	4Real 4Real (2019)	My Life 4Hunnid (2020)

Singles from 4Real 4Real
- 1. "Stop Snitchin" Released: April 24, 2019; 2. "Go Loko" Released: May 3, 2019

4Real 4Real (stylized in all caps) is the fourth studio album by American rapper YG, released on May 24, 2019, by 4Hunnid Records and Def Jam Recordings. The album features guest appearances from G-Eazy, DaBaby, Tyga, Meek Mill, Ty Dolla $ign, and Nipsey Hussle, among others.

== Background ==
YG released the album Stay Dangerous in August 2018. Eight months later, he revealed his next album at Coachella, which he had intended to release that day, but the death of fellow rapper and friend Nipsey Hussle led to the album's release being delayed to May 3, and later being further delayed to May 24. In the meantime, he released both of the album's singles.

== Singles ==
YG initially previewed the lead single "Stop Snitchin" at Coachella on April 14, 2019. The performance was supported by pictures of rappers Skinnyfromthe9 and 6ix9ine on a monitor, who both agreed to plea deals in August 2018 and February 2019, respectively, earning themselves the label "snitches" from the hip hop community. The song was released as the lead single from the album on April 24, 2019. It peaked at number 98 on the Billboard Hot 100 chart. A music video was released on April 24. A remix featuring DaBaby, along with another music video directed by Cole Bennett, was released on June 9.

The second single, "Go Loko", featuring guest appearances from Tyga and Jon Z, was released on May 3, 2019, along with an accompanying music video. It peaked at number 49 on the Billboard Hot 100 chart, and was certified platinum by the Recording Industry Association of America on August 23 for shipping 1,000,000 certification units.

== Critical reception ==
Professional ratings
Aggregate scores
Source	Rating
Metacritic	70/100
Review scores
Source	Rating
Consequence of Sound	positive
Highsnobiety	4/5 stars
Pitchfork	7.2/10
RapReviews	8/10
Rolling Stone	2.5/5 stars

4Real 4Real received generally positive reviews from critics. At Metacritic, which assigns a normalized rating out of 100 to reviews from mainstream publications, the album received an average score of 70, based on 8 reviews. Karas Lamb stated that "4Real 4Real carries some of the most introspective writing from YG to date." Sheldon Pearce of Pitchfork praised the album saying "4Real 4Real doesn't quite reestablish YG as the album artist of My Krazy Life and Still Brazy, but what it lacks in a satisfying through line it makes up for in highlights." Steve Juon of RapReviews said, "It's another solid album from an artist who like his late friend can crossover into a lot of areas (and arenas) given the chance."

In a mixed review, Danny Schwartz of Rolling Stone said, "Released just nine months after Stay Dangerous, 4Real 4Real flies well below the lofty standard YG set with his first two albums and smells of his eagerness to get out of his label contract."

== Commercial performance ==
In YG's home country of United States, 4Real 4Real debuted at number seven on the US Billboard 200 with 37,000 album-equivalent units, which included 4,000 pure album sales. It serves as YG's fourth consecutive top-ten album in the United States. In Canada, 4Real 4Real debuted at number eight on the Canadian Albums Chart, serving as YG's third non-consecutive top-ten album in the country.

== Track listing ==
Credits adapted from Tidal.

No.	Title	Writer(s)	Producer(s)	Length
1.	"Hard Bottoms & White Socks"	Keenon Jackson; Enoch Harris	Lil Rich	3:48
2.	"Bottle Service"	Jackson; Dijon MacFarlane; Kevin Gomringer; Tim Gomringer	Mustard; Cubeatz^{[a]}	2:53
3.	"In the Dark"	Jackson; MacFarlane; Lawrence Smith; Jalil Hutchins	Mustard	3:12
4.	"Go Loko" (featuring Tyga and Jon Z)	Jackson; MacFarlane; Shah Rukh Zaman Khan; Michael Stevenson; Jonathan Quiñones	Mustard; GYLTTRYP^{[a]}	4:59
5.	"Stop Snitchin"	Jackson; Thomas Horton; Aaron Tago	TnTXD; Yung Tago	2:30
6.	"I Was on the Block" (featuring Valee and Boogie)	Jackson; MacFarlane; Valee Taylor; Anthony Dixson	Mustard	4:01
7.	"Keshia Had a Baby" (featuring Rose Gold)	Jackson; Samuel Ahana; Rebekah Muhammed	Swish	3:58
8.	"Heart 2 Heart" (featuring Meek Mill, Arin Ray and Rose Gold)	Jackson; Ahana; Quinton Cook; Timothy Wells, Jr.; Robert Williams; Arin Ray; Muhammed	Swish; Tariq Beats; Musik MajorX^{[a]}	3:51
9.	"Play Too Much" (featuring Safe)	Jackson; Brandon McFarland; Saif Musaad	1-O.A.K.	3:24
10.	"Do Not Disturb" (featuring Kamaiyah and G-Eazy)	Jackson; Chauncey Hollis; Dustin Corbett; Kamaiyah Johnson; Gerald Gillum; Pharrell Williams; Chad Hugo; Michael Tyler	Hit-Boy; Corbett^{[a]}	3:06
11.	"Do Yo Dance" (featuring Kamaiyah, RJ, Mitch and Ty Dolla Sign)	Jackson; McFarland; Johnson; Tyrone Griffin, Jr.; Mark Wood; Rodney Brown; Jordan Mitchell; Stephen Shockley; Fred Alexander; Frederick Lewis; Marvin Craig; Norman Beavers; Otis Stokes; Thomas Shelby; Tiemeyer McCain	1-O.A.K.	4:30
12.	"Her Story" (featuring Day Sulan)	Jackson; Jonathan Cuskey; Daysha Morgan; Dashon Wright	Cronkite	1:57
13.	"My Last Words" (Nipsey Tribute)	Jackson		2:41
14.	"Stop Snitchin (Remix)" (featuring DaBaby)	Jackson; Horton; Tago; Jonathan Kirk	TnTXD; Yung Tago	2:17
Total length:				47:07

Notes

- ^{^[a]} signifies a co-producer

Sample credits

- "In the Dark" contains an interpolation of "Freaks Come Out at Night" written by Lawrence Smith and Jalil Hutchins and performed by Whodini.
- "Go Loko" contains a sample of "Some Cut" performed by Trillville.
- "Do Not Disturb" contains an interpolation of "Shake Ya Ass" written by Michael Tyler, Pharrell Williams, and Chad Hugo and performed by Mystikal feat. Pharrell Williams.
- "Do Yo Dance" contains a sample of "Fantastic Voyage" written by Fred Alexander, Norman Beavers, Marvin Craig, Frederick Lewis, Tiemeyer McCain, Thomas Shelby, Stephen Stockley, Otis Stokes and Mark Wood and performed by Lakeside.
- "My Last Words" contains audio taken from YG's speech at Nipsey Hussle's memorial service in Los Angeles on 11 April 2019.

== Charts ==
=== Weekly charts ===
Chart performance for 4Real 4Real
Chart (2019)	Peak position
Australian Albums (ARIA)	25
Austrian Albums (Ö3 Austria)	68
Belgian Albums (Ultratop Flanders)	119
Canadian Albums (Billboard)	8
Dutch Albums (Album Top 100)	35
French Albums (SNEP)	139
German Albums (Offizielle Top 100)	89
Irish Albums (IRMA)	96
Latvian Albums (LAIPA)	9
Lithuanian Albums (AGATA)	12
New Zealand Albums (RMNZ)	17
Norwegian Albums (VG-lista)	29
Swiss Albums (Schweizer Hitparade)	36
US Billboard 200	7
US Top R&B/Hip-Hop Albums (Billboard)	5

=== Year-end charts ===
2019 year-end chart performance for 4Real 4Real
Chart (2019)	Position
US Top R&B/Hip-Hop Albums (Billboard)	84

== Certifications ==
Certifications for 4Real 4Real
Region	Certification	Certified units/sales
United States (RIAA)	Gold	500,000^{‡}
^{‡} Sales+streaming figures based on certification alone.
