= B. Smyth =

American R&B singer (1992–2022)

- Smith in 2022

Background information
- Born: Brandon Alexander Smith; March 12, 1992; Fort Lauderdale, Florida, U.S.
- Died: November 17, 2022 (aged 30)
- Genres: R&B; pop rap
- Occupations: Singer; songwriter; rapper; dancer
- Years active: 2005–2022
- Labels: ByStorm; RCA; Motown (former)
- Website: b-smyth.com

Brandon Alexander Smith (March 12, 1992 (Note: Other sources state 1994.) – November 17, 2022), known professionally as B. Smyth, was an American singer, songwriter, rapper and dancer from Fort Lauderdale, Florida.

== Early life ==
Smith was born in Fort Lauderdale, Florida. He started out his career by posting his own covers of popular songs on YouTube, including "Stay" by Rihanna and "Quickie" by Miguel, in which some of his covers he posted have received over 500,000 views. His videos led to him performing at various high-profile talent shows, where his style drew comparisons to prominent artists Chris Brown and Usher.

== Career ==
Smyth's success at talent shows landed him a recording contract with Motown in 2012. He released his debut single, "Leggo" featuring 2 Chainz, on December 11, 2012. The song reached No. 41 on Hot R&B Songs and No. 20 on Bubbling Under Hot 100 Singles, peaking at number 12 on the latter chart.

Smyth released his first EP, The Florida Files, on October 15, 2013, featuring his second single, "Win Win" featuring Future. The song was produced by Mike Will Made It and Pluss.

Smyth switched record labels from Motown to ByStorm Entertainment and RCA Records. On December 4, 2015, he released his first single with ByStorm and RCA, "Creep" featuring Young Thug. The song was produced by Dun Deal.

== Death ==
Smyth died from pulmonary fibrosis on November 17, 2022, at the age of 30.

== Discography ==
=== Extended plays ===
| Title | Album details |
|---|---|
| The Florida Files | Released: January 1, 2013; Label: Motown; Format: Digital download |
| Thr3 | Released: 2017; Label: Motown; Format: Digital download |

=== Singles ===
| Title | Year | Peak chart positions | | Album |
| Title | Year | US | US R&B | Album |
|---|---|---|---|---|
| "Leggo" (featuring 2 Chainz) | 2012 | — (Note: "Leggo" did not enter the Billboard Hot 100, but peaked at number 12 on the Bubbling Under Hot 100 Singles.) | 41 | Non-album single |
| "Win Win" (featuring Future) | 2013 | — | — | The Florida Files |
| "Twerkoholic" | 2014 | — | — | Non-album singles |
| "Creep" (featuring Young Thug) | 2015 | — | — | Non-album singles |
| "Love Killa" | 2016 | — | — | Non-album singles |
| "Gold Wrappers" (featuring Rick Ross) | 2016 | — | — | Non-album singles |
| "Might Cuff U" | 2017 | — | — | Thr3 |
| "Kisses" | 2017 | — | — | Thr3 |
"—" denotes items which were not released in that country or failed to chart.
