= Parking Lot (Mustard and Travis Scott song) =

Single by Mustard and Travis Scott

from the album Faith of a Mustard Seed
- Released: June 21, 2024
- Length: 2:53
- Label: 10 Summers; BMG
- Songwriters: Dijon McFarlane; Jacques Webster II; Nicholas Balding; Keanu Torres; Stefano Bauer; Quintin Gulledge
- Producers: Mustard; Nic Nac; Keanu Beats; Farmer

Mustard singles chronology
"In My Room" (Euro Trash Remix) (2023)	"Parking Lot" (2024)	"Pray for Me" (2024)

Travis Scott singles chronology
"FTCU" (SleezeMix) (2024)	"Parking Lot" (2024)	"Oh Shhh..." (2024)

Music video
- "Parking Lot" on YouTube

"Parking Lot" is a song by American record producer Mustard and American rapper and singer Travis Scott. It was released through 10 Summers and BMG Rights Management as the lead single from Mustard's fourth studio album, Faith of a Mustard Seed, on June 21, 2024. The song was produced by Mustard himself, Nic Nac, Keanu Beats, and Farmer, all of whom wrote it with Travis Scott and Quintin Gulledge.

On June 17, 2024, Mustard announced the title of the song, along with its cover art and release date. The next day, he announced that Travis Scott would be the other co-lead artist of the song and shared a video of them recording it in a studio, in which a snippet of the chorus plays in the background.

== Lyrics and composition ==
Mustard's production is described as "soulful" while it's noted that the song is about how Travis enjoys "a woman’s company in a parking lot during the summer". The track is described as "Mustard's hard-hitting grooves" synced with "Scott's psych-trap sound".

== Critical reception ==
HotNewHipHop's Danilo Castro stated that Travis' "trademark woozy delivery fits perfectly over the repetitive beat" and that the track "adopts some of Scott's production flourishes on the back end, which serves as a nice change-up".

== Charts ==
=== Weekly charts ===
Weekly chart performance for "Parking Lot"
Chart (2024)	Peak position
Australia Hip Hop/R&B (ARIA)	19
Canada Hot 100 (Billboard)	49
Global 200 (Billboard)	74
Greece International (IFPI)	34
New Zealand Hot Singles (RMNZ)	5
Switzerland (Schweizer Hitparade)	69
UK Singles (Official Charts)	83
UK Indie (Official Charts)	23
US Billboard Hot 100	57
US Hot R&B/Hip-Hop Songs (Billboard)	17
US Rhythmic Airplay (Billboard)	2

=== Year-end charts ===
2024 year-end chart performance for "Parking Lot"
Chart (2024)	Position
US Hot R&B/Hip-Hop Songs (Billboard)	67
US Rhythmic (Billboard)	36

== Certifications ==
Certifications for "Parking Lot"
Region	Certification	Certified units/sales
New Zealand (RMNZ)	Gold	15,000^{‡}
United States (RIAA)	Gold	500,000^{‡}
^{‡} Sales+streaming figures based on certification alone.
