= Leggo (song) =

2012 single by B. Smyth featuring 2 Chainz

Single by B. Smyth featuring 2 Chainz
- Released: December 11, 2012
- Length: 4:02
- Label: Motown
- Songwriters: Brandon Smith; Tauheed Epps
- Producer: Mike Stackz

B. Smyth singles chronology
"Leggo" (2012)	"Win Win" (2013)

2 Chainz singles chronology
"I'm Different" (2012)	"Leggo" (2012)	"R.I.P." (2013)

Music video
- "Leggo" on YouTube

"Leggo" is the debut single by American singer B. Smyth, released on December 11, 2012. It features American rapper 2 Chainz and was produced by Mike Stackz.

== Background ==
In an interview with Complex, B. Smyth explained how the song and his collaboration with 2 Chainz came about:

That was put together by Def Jam and Motown. After we did the song, they asked me who would I like to put on there. I said 2 Chainz, amongst other rappers. With him being signed to Def Jam, it wasn't too hard to get him on the record. From there we sent him the song and he did it. Then we ended up putting the record out and making it the first single.

"Leggo" became B. Smyth's breakthrough hit and most successful song. The music video for the song gained over 4 million views in 2013. It debuted at number 20 on the Bubbling Under Hot 100 Singles chart and peaked at number 12.

== Charts ==
Chart (2013)	Peak position
US Bubbling Under Hot 100 (Billboard)	12
US Hot R&B/Hip-Hop Songs (Billboard)	41
US Rhythmic Airplay (Billboard)	18

== Release history ==
Release dates and formats for "Leggo"
Region	Date	Format	Label(s)	Ref.
United States	May 7, 2013	Mainstream airplay	IDJMG	
