= Promise (Kid Ink song) =

Single by Kid Ink featuring Fetty Wap

from the album Summer in the Winter
- Released: December 24, 2015
- Recorded: 2015
- Genre: Hip hop
- Length: 3:44
- Label: Tha Alumni Music Group; 88 Classic; RCA Records
- Songwriters: Brian Collins; Dijon McFarlane; Lewis Hughes; Nicholas Audino; Willie Maxwell II; James Royo
- Producers: DJ Mustard; Twice as Nice

Kid Ink singles chronology
"Dolo" (2015)	"Promise" (2015)	"Nasty" (2016)

Fetty Wap singles chronology
"Bang My Head" (2015)	"Promise" (2015)	"Jimmy Choo" (2016)

"Promise" is a song by American rapper and singer Kid Ink featuring fellow American rapper and singer Fetty Wap. Written alongside James Royo and producers DJ Mustard and Twice as Nice, it was released on Christmas Eve 2015 by Tha Alumni Music Group, 88 Classic, and RCA Records as the only single from his sixth solo mixtape Summer in the Winter, released a day later on Christmas.

== Music video ==
The song's accompanying music video premiered on March 14, 2016 on Kid Ink's Vevo channel on YouTube. It was directed by Mike Ho.

== Commercial performance ==
"Promise" debuted at number 92 on Billboard Hot 100 for the chart dated March 5, 2016. It eventually made it way to number 57. On February 10, 2025, the single was certified double platinum by the Recording Industry Association of America (RIAA) for combined sales and streaming equivalent units of over a million units in the United States.

== Charts ==
=== Weekly charts ===
Chart (2016)	Peak position
Australia (ARIA)	61
US Billboard Hot 100	57
US Hot R&B/Hip-Hop Songs (Billboard)	19
US Rhythmic Airplay (Billboard)	6

=== Year-end charts ===
Chart (2016)	Position
US Hot R&B/Hip-Hop Songs (Billboard)	66
US Rhythmic (Billboard)	31

== Certifications ==
Region	Certification	Certified units/sales
Australia (ARIA)	Gold	35,000^{‡}
New Zealand (RMNZ)	Platinum	30,000^{‡}
United Kingdom (BPI)	Silver	200,000^{‡}
United States (RIAA)	2× Platinum	2,000,000^{‡}
^{‡} Sales+streaming figures based on certification alone.
