= JR Castro =

- Born: Richard James Castro; August 12, 1986 (age 40); Las Vegas, Nevada, U.S.
- Genre: R&B
- Occupation: Singer-songwriter
- Instrument: Vocals
- Years active: 2007–present
- Labels: Global Music; EMPIRE
- Formerly of: I-15
- Website: www.jrcastrolv.com

Richard James "JR" Castro (born August 12, 1986) is an American R&B singer-songwriter from Las Vegas, Nevada. Castro was originally a member of the Interscope/Zone 4 R&B act I-15, best known for their 2007 single, "Lost in Love". In 2015, he gained attention for his debut solo single "Get Home" featuring Kid Ink and Quavo.

== Career ==
=== Career beginnings ===
Castro started his career as a member of I-15, an R&B trio. They gained attention with their 2007 single "Lost in Love", which was produced by Polow Da Don. In 2007 the group was featured on the single "Soulja Girl" by American rapper Soulja Boy. It peaked at number 32 on the US Billboard Hot 100.

=== 2015–present: Songs You Were Made To and Sexpectations, Vol.1 ===
In July 2015, Castro released his debut solo single "Get Home", which was produced by DJ Mustard and features guest appearances from American rappers Kid Ink and Quavo of Migos. An official music video for the single was released in October 2015. "Get Home" peaked at number 11 on the US Rhythmic chart and topped the Bubbling Under R&B/Hip-Hop Singles chart.

In February 2016, Castro premiered the music video for the Timbaland-produced single "FMN". While talking about how he met Timbaland, Castro said; "I met Timbaland in Vegas backstage one year at a Justin Timberlake concert in 2014. He heard my music going around the city, being in Vegas. At the time the music I had out was strictly in the city and he got a hold of it. He thought it was dope. It was a blessing for me as it was Timbaland." On August 22, 2016, Castro released his debut EP Songs You Were Made To, which features guest appearances from Poo Bear and Goldie. On October 13, 2017, he released his second EP titled Sexpectations, Vol.1.

== Discography ==
=== EPs ===
List of EPs, showing selected details
Title	Details
Songs You Were Made To	Released: August 22, 2016; Label: PMG; Format: Digital download
Sexpectations, Vol.1	Released: October 13, 2017; Label: PMG / EMPIRE; Format: Digital download

=== Singles ===
==== As lead artist ====
List of singles as lead artist, with selected chart positions, showing year released and album name
Title	Year	Peak chart positions		Album
Title	Year	US R&B /HH	US Rhy.	Album
"Get Home" (featuring Kid Ink and Quavo)	2015	— (Note: "Get Home" did not enter the Billboard R&B/Hip-Hop Singles, but peaked at number 1 on the Bubbling Under R&B/Hip-Hop Singles chart.)	11	Sexpectations, Vol.1
"FMN" (featuring Timbaland)	2016	—	—	Sexpectations, Vol.1
"Right Away"	2016	—	31	Sexpectations, Vol.1
"They Don't Know"	2016	—	—	Songs You Were Made To
"Sexpectations"	2017	—	—	Sexpectations, Vol. 1
"Sh** You Like" (featuring Dizzy Wright)	2018	—	—	Sexpectations, Vol. 1
"Bon Voyage" (featuring Breakfast N Vegas)	2018	—	—	TBA
"For Me or Against Me"	2020	—	—	TBA
"Familiar Place (Red Eye To Vegas)"	2020	—	—	TBA
"The Morning After"	2020	—	—	TBA
"—" denotes items which were not released in that country or failed to chart.

==== As featured artist ====
List of singles as a featured artist, showing year released and album name
Title	Year	Album
"Soulja Girl" (Soulja Boy featuring JR Castro (as part of I-15))	2007	souljaboytellem.com
"Want To" (Micah Banks featuring JR Castro, Iamsu! and AD)	2016	Non-album singles
"Unused to You" (InkMonstarr featuring JR Castro)	2016	Non-album singles
"Magic" (Abrina featuring JR Castro)	2016	Non-album singles

== See also ==
- 3LW
- Kiely Williams
