= Summer in the Winter =

Mixtape by Kid Ink
- Released: December 25, 2015
- Recorded: 2015
- Genre: Hip-hop
- Length: 36:55
- Label: RCA
- Producer: DJ Mustard (exec.); Twice as Nice; X Side; J-Holt; The Featherstones; K.E.; D.A. Doman

Kid Ink chronology
| Full Speed (2015) | Summer in the Winter (2015) | RSS2 (2016) |

Singles from Summer in the Winter
- 1. "Promise" Released: December 24, 2015

Summer in the Winter is a commercial mixtape by American rapper Kid Ink, released on Christmas Day, 2015 by RCA Records. It was produced largely by DJ Mustard, who acted as executive producer; additional producers on the mixtape include D.A. Doman, Twice as Nice, K.E. on the Track, and The Featherstones, among others. Released the following day of his single "Promise", guest performers on the project include Fetty Wap (who performs on the song), Akon, Omarion, Bia, and Starrah.

== Commercial performance ==
Summer in the Winter debuted at number 50 on the US Billboard 200, with 16,000 equivalent album units (selling 11,000 in pure sales).

== Singles ==
"Promise" served as the lead single from the project. It was released on December 24, 2015, along the promotional single "Blowin' Swishers Pt.2".

== Track listing ==
Credits were adapted from Tidal.

| No. | Title | Writer(s) | Producer(s) | Length |
|---|---|---|---|---|
| 1. | "Bunny Ranch" | Brian Collins; Te Whiti Warbrick; Lewis Hughes; Nicholas Audino; Dijon McFarlane | DJ Mustard; Twice as Nice | 2:48 |
| 2. | "Real Recognize" | Collins; McFarlane; Audino; Hughes | DJ Mustard | 3:18 |
| 3. | "Promise" (featuring Fetty Wap) | Collins; McFarlane; Hughes; Audino; Willie Maxwell II | DJ Mustard | 3:44 |
| 4. | "Rewind" (featuring Akon) | Collins; McFarlane; Maurice Simmonds; Audino; Hughes; Aliaune Thiam; Herby Azor | DJ Mustard | 4:00 |
| 5. | "Blowin' Swishers Pt. 2" (featuring Starrah) | Collins; Jordan Holt; Kevin Erondu; Brittany Hazzard | J-Holt; K.E. on the Track | 3:02 |
| 6. | "Same Day" | Collins; McFarlane; Holt; Zihirr Mitchell | DJ Mustard | 3:02 |
| 7. | "Bank" | Collins; David Doman; Marlin Bonds | D.A. Got That Dope | 3:49 |
| 8. | "Summer in the Winter" (featuring Omarion) | Collins; McFarlane; Khaled Rohaim; Warbrick; Audino; Hughes; Omari Grandberry | DJ Mustard | 3:07 |
| 9. | "Good Idea" (featuring Bia) | Collins; William Featherstone; Matthew Featherstone; Christopher Featherstone; Justin Featherstone; Brittany Hazzard | The Featherstones | 3:16 |
| 10. | "That's on You" | Collins; Rohaim; McFarlane; Audino; Hughes | DJ Mustard | 3:30 |
| 11. | "Time Out" | Collins; Rohaim; McFarlane; Audino; Hughes | DJ Mustard | 3:19 |

Notes

- "Promise" feature background vocals from Lewis Hughes
- "Bank" feature background vocals from Marlin Bonds
- "Summer in the Winter", "That's on You" and "Time Out" feature background vocals from Khaled Rohaim

== Charts ==
| Chart (2016) | Peak position |
|---|---|
| Canadian Albums (Billboard) | 50 |
| Dutch Albums (Album Top 100) | 93 |
| Swiss Albums (Schweizer Hitparade) | 73 |
| UK Album Downloads (OCC) | 50 |
| UK R&B Albums (OCC) | 10 |
| US Billboard 200 | 50 |
| US Top R&B/Hip-Hop Albums (Billboard) | 10 |

== Release history ==
| Country | Date | Format | Label | Ref. |
|---|---|---|---|---|
| Worldwide | December 25, 2015 | Digital download; Online streaming | RCA | |
