= Stop Snitchin (song) =

2019 single by YG

Single by YG

from the album 4Real 4Real
- Released: April 24, 2019
- Genre: Hardcore hip hop; West Coast hip hop
- Length: 2:30
- Label: 4Hunnid; Def Jam; Universal Music Group
- Songwriters: Keenon Jackson; Thomas Horton; Aaron Tago
- Producers: TnTXD; Yung Tago

YG singles chronology
"La La Land" (2019)	"Stop Snitchin" (2019)	"Go Loko" (2019)

Music video
- "Stop Snitchin" on YouTube

"Stop Snitchin" is a song by American rapper YG, released as the lead single for his fourth studio album 4Real 4Real on April 24, 2019. It is a diss track aimed at rapper 6ix9ine.

== Background ==
"Stop Snitchin" is a diss song towards rapper 6ix9ine, whose feud with YG reignited in 2018 starting with YG's video for his song "Bulletproof", in which a 6ix9ine lookalike is being locked up and taunted by prison inmates before the word "pedophile" flashes, alluding to the child sexual performance charges he pled guilty to in 2015. In November 2018, 6ix9ine was arrested on multiple federal crime charges. The song's diss refers to his plea deal and cooperation with federal prosecutors.

YG premiered the song during his Coachella set in April 2019, performing in front of a photo of 6ix9ine's mugshot emblazoned across the festival's jumbotron.

The single was released on April 24, 2019. A rat is shown on the cover artwork, referencing the slang definition of the word, meaning one who tells on others to authorities.

“Stop Snitchin” is one of the most profane songs of all time; YG curses 223 times in it.

== Remix ==
The official remix of the song features American rapper DaBaby, and it appeared in YG's album 4Real 4Real.

== Music video ==
The music video was released alongside the single. In it, YG plays the leader of a slave rebellion.

== Charts ==
=== Weekly charts ===
Chart (2019)	Peak position
US Billboard Hot 100	98
US Hot R&B/Hip-Hop Songs (Billboard)	40

== Certifications ==
Region	Certification	Certified units/sales
United States (RIAA)	Platinum	1,000,000^{‡}
^{‡} Sales+streaming figures based on certification alone.
