= Get Home (JR Castro song) =

Single by JR Castro featuring Kid Ink and Quavo

from the album Sexpectations, Vol.1
- Released: July 31, 2015
- Recorded: 2015
- Genre: R&B; hip hop
- Length: 4:00
- Songwriters: Jason Boyd, Brian Collins, Sean Combs, Kervin Cotton, Faith Evans, James Giannos, Dominic Jordan, Quavious Marshall, Dijon McFarlane, Daen Simmons, Carl E. Thompson
- Producer: DJ Mustard

JR Castro singles chronology
"Get Home" (2015)	"FMN" (2016)

Kid Ink singles chronology
"That's How You Know" (2015)	"Get Home" (2015)	"Dolo" (2015)

Quavo singles chronology
"What Are You Thinking?" (2014)	"Get Home" (2015)	"Why You Hating" (2016)

"Get Home" is a song by American recording artist JR Castro. It was released on July 31, 2015, as the first single from his second EP, Sexpectations, Vol.1 (2017). The track, produced by DJ Mustard, features guest appearances from American rappers Kid Ink and Quavo of Migos.

== Music video ==
The official music video for "Get Home" premiered on October 9, 2015, on Castro's VEVO channel.

== Track listing ==
Digital download

- "Get Home" (featuring Kid Ink and Quavo) (Explicit) – 4:00
- "Get Home" (featuring Kid Ink and Quavo) (Clean) – 4:00

== Charts ==
Chart (2015–16)	Peak position
US Bubbling Under R&B/Hip-Hop Singles (Billboard)	1
US Rhythmic Airplay (Billboard)	11
