= Major Distribution (50 Cent song) =

Single by 50 Cent featuring Snoop Dogg and Young Jeezy

Single by 50 Cent featuring Snoop Dogg and Young Jeezy
- Released: February 5, 2013
- Recorded: 2012
- Genre: Hip-hop; gangsta rap
- Length: 4:23
- Label: Shady; Aftermath; G-Unit; Interscope; Universal
- Songwriters: Curtis Jackson; Calvin Broadus; Jay Jenkins; Marvin Coady; Wilton Godfrey; Chuck Jackson
- Producer: Soul Professa

50 Cent singles chronology
"Hate Bein' Sober" (2012)	"Major Distribution" (2013)	"We Up" (2013)

Snoop Dogg singles chronology
"Slow Motion" (2012)	"Major Distribution" (2013)	"Ashtrays and Heartbreaks" (2013)

Young Jeezy singles chronology
"R.I.P." (2013)	"Major Distribution" (2013)	"R.I.P. (Remix)" (2013)

"Major Distribution" is a song by American rapper 50 Cent. It was originally released as a single in promotion for his abandoned sixth studio album Street King Immortal. The song premiered on December 20, 2012, on New York City radio station Hot 97 with DJ Enuff. The song, produced by Soul Professa, features fellow American rappers Snoop Dogg and Young Jeezy. It was made available for purchase on February 5, 2013.

== Background ==
The song's release on the iTunes Store was announced with the official music video, after being released in December. Young Jeezy's verse, recorded in the second half of 2012, was confirmed by 50 Cent in an interview with DJ Whoo Kid, in July.

== Music video ==
A music video for was filmed throughout December and January, being directed by Eif Rivera. It includes cameo appearances from 50 Cent's fellow G-Unit members, including Tony Yayo and Kidd Kidd. Also, the affiliates of Snoop Dogg and Young Jeezy appear in the video, such as Kurupt, Daz Dillinger and members of CTE World, respectively. A teaser video was released before the song's release on December 20, via 50 Cent's YouTube channel. The music video came out on January 23, 2013, on VEVO channel of 50 Cent. On January 28, 2013, it was made available for purchase on iTunes Store.

The music video and song has been viewed over 30 million times on YouTube.

=== Controversy ===
In the video, G-Unit flaunts Gunplay's MMG chain that was taken from him at a brawl backstage at the 2012 BET Hip Hop Awards. G-Unit's Kidd Kidd has the chain draped around his sons neck in the video.

== Track listing ==
Digital download

1. "Major Distribution" (featuring Snoop Dogg and Young Jeezy) - 4:23

== Credits and personnel ==
- Songwriter – Curtis Jackson, Calvin Broadus, Jay Jenkins, Marvin Coady, W. Godfrey & Chuck Jackson
- Production – Soul Professa

== Charts ==
Chart (2013)	Peak position
US Bubbling Under Hot 100 Singles (Billboard)	13
US Hot R&B/Hip-Hop Songs (Billboard)	43
UK Hip Hop/R&B (Official Charts)	32

== Release history ==
Country	Date	Format	Label	Ref
Canada	February 5, 2013	Digital download	Shady, Aftermath, Interscope	
United States	February 5, 2013	Digital download	Shady, Aftermath, Interscope	
