= Whole Lotta Lovin' (Mustard and Travis Scott song) =

"Whole Lotta Lovin"

Single by DJ Mustard and Travis Scott
- Released: January 8, 2016
- Recorded: 2016
- Genre: Hip house
- Length: 4:59
- Label: Roc Nation; Pu$haz Ink
- Songwriters: Dijon McFarlane; Jacques Webster II; Julian Gramma; Nick Audino
- Producers: DJ Mustard; J Gramm

DJ Mustard singles chronology
"In My Room" (2015)	"Whole Lotta Lovin" (2016)	"Don't Hurt Me" (2016)

Travis Scott singles chronology
"Antidote" (2015)	"Whole Lotta Lovin" (2016)	"Bake Sale" (2016)

"Whole Lotta Lovin" is a song by American hip hop producer DJ Mustard and American rapper Travis Scott. It was released as a single on January 8, 2016, by Roc Nation and Pu$haz Ink.

== Music video ==
The music video of the song was released on YouTube on January 11, 2016. In the video, Travis Scott was in the same place with Mustard, on the road and at the party. The video talks about love of a blonde hair girl and love of a lesbian couple.

== Charts ==
Chart (2016)	Peak position
US Bubbling Under Hot 100 (Billboard)	18
US Hot R&B/Hip-Hop Songs (Billboard)	38

== Certifications ==
Region	Certification	Certified units/sales
United States (RIAA)	Gold	500,000^{‡}
^{‡} Sales+streaming figures based on certification alone.
