= R.I.P. (Young Jeezy song) =

Single by Jeezy featuring 2 Chainz

from the album It's tha World
- Released: February 5, 2013
- Recorded: 2012
- Genre: Hip hop
- Length: 3:18
- Label: CTE World; Def Jam
- Songwriters: Jay Jenkins; Tauheed Epps; Dijon McFarlane
- Producer: DJ Mustard

Young Jeezy singles chronology
"Show Out" (2013)	"R.I.P." (2013)	"Major Distribution" (2013)

2 Chainz singles chronology
"Leggo" (2012)	"R.I.P." (2013)	"Rich As Fuck" (2013)

"R.I.P." is a song by American rapper Jeezy, released as the second single from his twelfth mixtape It's tha World (2012). It features vocals from fellow rapper 2 Chainz and was produced by record producer DJ Mustard.

== Music video ==
The music video was filmed on March 6, 2013, at a Los Angeles club and on March 24, 2013, the music video was released. The music video features cameo appearances from Snoop Dogg, Warren G, Trey Songz, Nelly, T.I., Big Sean, E-40, Nipsey Hussle, YG, DJ Drama, Ne-Yo and Ludacris.

== Remixes ==
The official remix was released on March 29, 2013, and features YG, Kendrick Lamar and Chris Brown. In the song Chris Brown disses Canadian rapper Drake. On April 7, DJ Skee released an extended remix featuring rapper Riff Raff. The following day the official "G-Mix" was released featuring Snoop Dogg, Too Short and E-40.

== Charts ==
=== Weekly charts ===
Chart (2013)	Peak position
US Billboard Hot 100	58
US Hot R&B/Hip-Hop Songs (Billboard)	17
US Hot Rap Songs (Billboard)	12

=== Year-end charts ===
Chart (2013)	Position
US Hot R&B/Hip-Hop Songs (Billboard)	52
US Rap Songs (Billboard)	40

== Certifications ==
Region	Certification	Certified units/sales
United States (RIAA)	Platinum	1,000,000^{‡}
^{‡} Sales+streaming figures based on certification alone.

== Release history ==
Country	Date	Format	Label	Ref.
United States	February 5, 2013	Digital download	Def Jam Recordings	
United States	February 12, 2013	Rhythmic contemporary radio	Def Jam; The Island Def Jam Music Group	
