= Faith of a Mustard Seed =

Studio album by Mustard
- Released: July 26, 2024
- Recorded: 2023 – 2024
- Genre: Hip-hop
- Length: 50:40
- Label: 10 Summers; BMG
- Producer: Agape Woodlyn; Boobie; Dammo the Great; Farmer; Cam Griffin; J.Lbs; JHolt; Keanu Beats; LarryJayy; Lewis Hughes; Masego; Mike Robbins; Monte Booker; Mustard; Nic Nac; Peter Lee Johnson; Phoelix; Quintin Gulledge; Samuel Jammeh; Sean Momberger; Terrace Martin; Victor Thell

Mustard chronology
Perfect Ten (2019)	Faith of a Mustard Seed (2024)

Singles from Faith of a Mustard Seed
- 1. "Parking Lot" Released: June 21, 2024; 2. "Pray for Me" Released: July 12, 2024

Faith of a Mustard Seed is the fourth studio album by American record producer Mustard. It was released through 10 Summers Records and BMG Rights Management on July 26, 2024. The album features guest appearances from Kirk Franklin, Lil Yachty, BlueBucksClan, 42 Dugg, Vince Staples, Schoolboy Q, Quavo, Rob49, Travis Scott, Ty Dolla Sign, Charlie Wilson, Masego, Blxst, A Boogie wit da Hoodie, Roddy Ricch, Future, Ella Mai, Kodak Black, Young Thug, and Lil Durk. Production was handled by Mustard and Masego themselves, alongside Monte Booker, Terrace Martin, and Nic Nac, among others. Faith of a Mustard Seed serves as the follow-up to Mustard's previous album, Perfect Ten (2019), and is also his first release under BMG after his contract with Interscope Records ended.

== Background and promotion ==
On June 5, 2024, his 34th birthday, Mustard shared a trailer video of the album on social media, in which he announced its title and shared that it would be released in the summer of that year. Shortly after, American rapper Schoolboy Q reposted Mustard's announcement on his Twitter account, stating that he had already heard the album and shared his opinion on it: "Heard it. Shit go dumb. LA bout to do it again... LA up this year". Five days later, Mustard took to social media to share the cover art and release date of the album. On June 21, 2024, he released the lead single of the album, "Parking Lot", a collaboration with American rapper and singer Travis Scott. He released the second single, "Pray for Me", on July 12, 2024. Exactly ten days later, he revealed the tracklist of the album and released the sole promotional single, "One Bad Decision", which features English singer-songwriter Ella Mai and American rapper Roddy Ricch.

== Critical reception ==
Professional ratings
Review scores
Source	Rating
Beats Per Minute	6/10
The Guardian	2/5 stars

Writing for Beats Per Minute in a mediocre review, Chase McMullen wrote that the album "is another collection of crisp, often luxurious Mustard beats" and that "this is music clearly created in an entirely different head space" in comparison to Mustard's previous records. The Guardian's Chal Ravens wrote in a negative review that the album is "an occasionally biographical tale of childhood nostalgia, middle-age melancholy and returning to the church" while stating that "the clicks and claps are too often drowned out by familiar ideas".

== Commercial performance ==
Faith of a Mustard Seed debuted at number 50 on the US Billboard 200 and number 11 on the Top R&B/Hip-Hop Albums charts selling 18,000 units in its first week.

== Track listing ==
Faith of a Mustard Seed track listing
No.	Title	Writer(s)	Producer(s)	Length
1.	"Show Me the Way" (featuring Kirk Franklin)	Dijon McFarlane; Kirk Franklin; Ahmanti Booker; Michael Neil; Quintin Gulledge	Mustard; Monte Booker; Phoelix; Gulledge^{[a]}	1:44
2.	"Up Now" (featuring Lil Yachty, BlueBucksClan, and 42 Dugg)	McFarlane; Miles McCollum; Deon Hawkins, Jr.; Jaylar Abram; Dion Hayes; Larry Sanders, Jr.; Lewis Hughes; Sean Momberger	Mustard; LarryJayy; Hughes; Momberger	4:25
3.	"Pressured Up" (featuring Vince Staples and Schoolboy Q)	McFarlane; Vincent Staples; Quincy Hanley; Terrace Martin; Jason Pounds	Mustard; Martin; J.Lbs	3:59
4.	"One of them Ones" (featuring Quavo and Rob49)	McFarlane; Quavious Marshall; Robert Thomas; Nicholas Balding; Peter Lee Johnson; Gulledge	Mustard; Nic Nac; Johnson; Gulledge^{[a]}	3:48
5.	"Parking Lot" (with Travis Scott)	McFarlane; Jacques Webster II; Balding; Keanu Torres; Stefan Bauer; Gulledge	Mustard; Nic Nac; Keanu Beats; Farmer	2:53
6.	"7 to 7"	McFarlane	Mustard	0:54
7.	"A Song for Mom" (with Ty Dolla Sign, Charlie Wilson, and Masego)	McFarlane; Tyrone Griffin, Jr.; Charles Wilson; Micah Davis	Mustard; Masego	2:09
8.	"Worth a Heartbreak" (with Blxst and A Boogie wit da Hoodie)	McFarlane; Matthew Burdette; Artist Dubose; Balding; Mike Robbins; Johnson	Mustard; Nic Nac; Robbins; Johnson^{[a]}	3:31
9.	"Truth Is" (featuring Roddy Ricch)	McFarlane; Rodrick Moore, Jr.; Jordan Holt	Mustard; JHolt	2:31
10.	"Mines" (with Ty Dolla Sign, Future, and Charlie Wilson)	McFarlane; Griffin; Nayvadius Wilburn; Wilson; Gulledge; Johnson	Mustard; Gulledge^{[a]}; Johnson^{[a]}	3:35
11.	"One Bad Decision" (featuring Ella Mai and Roddy Ricch)	McFarlane; Ella Howell; Moore; Sean Momberger	Mustard; Momberger	3:46
12.	"Yak's Prayer" (featuring Kodak Black)	McFarlane; Bill Kapri; Sanders; Momberger	Mustard; LarryJayy; Momberger	3:25
13.	"Ghetto" (featuring Young Thug and Lil Durk)	McFarlane; Jeffery Williams; Durk Banks; Cameron Griffin; Aubrey Robinson; Johnson	Mustard; Cam Griffin; Boobie; Johnson^{[a]}	3:58
14.	"Pray for Me"	McFarlane; Jason Jackson; Damien Farmer; Agape Jerry; Samuel Jammeh; Victor Thell	Mustard; Dammo the Great; Agape Woodlyn; Jammeh; Thell	10:00
Total length:				50:38

Note

- ^{^[a]} signifies an additional producer

== Personnel ==
- Mustard – mixing
- Cyrus "Nois" Taghipour – mixing
- David Pizzimenti – mixing, engineering
- Nicolas De Porcel – engineering
- Trey Pearce – engineering on "Show Me the Way" and "A Song for Mom"
- Gentuar Memishi – engineering on "Up Now"
- Macxsn – engineering on "Up Now"
- Noah Hashimoto – engineering on "Up Now"
- Gehring Miller – engineering on "Parking Lot", "7 to 7", and "One Bad Decision"
- Rafael "Fai" Bautista – engineering on "A Song for Mom"
- Richard "Segal" Huredia – engineering on "Worth a Heartbreak" and "Yak's Prayer"
- Chris Dennis – engineering on "Truth Is" and "One Bad Decision"
- Ben "Bengineer" Chang – engineering on "One Bad Decision"
- Dyryk – engineering "Yak's Prayer"
- Bainz – engineering on "Ghetto"
- Xavier Daniel – engineering on "Ghetto"
- Jusvibes – engineering on "Ghetto"
- Samson Byus Jr. – engineering on "Pray for Me"

== Charts ==
Chart performance for Faith of a Mustard Seed
Chart (2024)	Peak position
US Billboard 200	50
US Top R&B/Hip-Hop Albums (Billboard)	11
