= It's tha World =

Mixtape by Jeezy
- Released: December 12, 2012
- Recorded: 2012
- Genres: Hip hop; Southern hip-hop; gangsta rap; hardcore hip-hop
- Length: 60:13
- Labels: Def Jam; Corporate Thugz
- Producers: Lil Lody; Jahlil Beats; Kenoe; D Rich; Shawty Redd; The Renegades; Black Metaphor; Cardo; DJ Mustard; Warren G; Certified Truck Bangers; Got Coke; Terry "T.A." Allen; Mike WiLL Made It; Will-A-Fool; Key Wane

Jeezy chronology
The Real Is Back 2 (2011)	It's tha World (2012)

Singles from It's Tha World
- 1. "Get Right" Released: October 11, 2012; 2. "R.I.P." Released: February 5, 2013

It's tha World is the twelfth mixtape by American rapper Jeezy. It was released on December 12, 2012. The mixtape features guest appearances from 2 Chainz, YG, Birdman, Lil Boosie, E-40, and Trey Songz, among others.

== Singles ==
The lead single from the mixtape "Get Right" was released on October 11, 2012. On November 24, 2012, the first song was released in promotion of the mixtape titled "How It Feel" featuring Lil Lody. The mixtape was announced on December 1, 2012. On December 4, 2012, the second song was released in promotion of the mixtape titled "Stylin'".

On December 11, 2012, the third song was released in promotion of the mixtape titled "R.I.P." featuring 2 Chainz. It was eventually released as the second official single. It peaked at #59 on the Billboard Hot 100. The music video was filmed on March 6, 2013, at a Los Angeles club and on March 24, 2013, the music video was released for "R.I.P." The music video features cameo appearances from Snoop Dogg, Trey Songz, Nelly, Big Sean, E-40, Nipsey Hussle, YG, Ne-Yo and Ludacris. The official remix was released on March 29, 2013, and features YG, Kendrick Lamar and Chris Brown.

On December 12, 2012, the music video for "El Jefe" was released. On December 19, 2012, the music video for "How It Feel" featuring Lil Lody was released.

== Critical response ==
Professional ratings
Review scores
Source	Rating
AllHipHop	(7.5/10)
XXL	(L)

It's tha World was met with generally mixed reviews from music critics. King Eljay of AllHipHop gave the mixtape a 7.5 out of 10, saying "It’s one of the stronger releases from Jeezy that we’ve had in recent memory, and it’s fully deserving of the free download. Jeezy’s improving his consistency, and even with the few filler songs sprinkled in (along with redundant topics, of course), if he continues in this vein there’s no real reason to think he’ll fall off any time soon. With production from the aforementioned Lodi, Jahlil Beats, Black Metaphor, Cardo, Mike Will, and more, Its Tha World is a nice serving of Jeezy that will hold us over until he pops next". Ralph Bristout of XXL gave the mixtape an L, saying "There are moments when the beats don’t match up to the sermons, leaving the ’tape’s overall cohesiveness in shambles. The DJ Mustard-produced “R.I.P.” (w/ 2 Chainz) is an example, as it comes off more lackluster than it appears on paper— especially as it sits between the more tranquil “Escobar” and “Just Got Word.” The beats (“Too Many Commas,” “Evil”) are not at fault. They just don't quite fit the bill compared to gems pocketed on past ’tapes like Trappin’ Ain’t Dead or even the last year's Real Is Back series. Albeit, Its Tha World serves as another batch of solid offering for the man whose become Public Enemy #1 as of late. No worries though, as he puts it on “Damn Liar,” “[It’ll] be a cold day in hell before they melt me".

Jesse Fairfax of HipHopDX said "Experimenting well with new trends, California party starter DJ Mustard is responsible for "R.I.P." and "All the Same" (benefitted by 2 Chainz and E-40 respectively), while West coast rookie YG brings his own youthful authenticity to "Just Got Word," all examples of the creative versatility which has made for Young Jeezy's longevity. Never neglecting to issue reminders of his glorious contributions to Rap, the tape closes with the self-entitled "Thank Me" aimed at anyone who has failed to relinquish proper appreciation. Jeezy has mastered the art of survival in music using It's Tha World as yet another showcase for loud and energetic boasts of materialism and fantasies that he's a major part of today's cocaine trade. The main fault to be found lies in repetition, as his rags to riches tale risks becoming stale to an audience all too familiar with this running routine".

== Track listing ==
No.	Title	Producer(s)	Length
1.	"El Jefe Intro"	Lil Lody	4:36
2.	"Knob Broke"	Jahlil Beats; Key Wane	4:04
3.	"Stylin"	Kenoe	3:14
4.	"How It Feel" (featuring Lil Lody)	D. Rich; Shawty Redd	4:42
5.	"Millions"	The Renegades	3:11
6.	"Get Right"	Black Metaphor	4:07
7.	"Escobar"	Cardo	3:41
8.	"R.I.P." (featuring 2 Chainz)	DJ Mustard	3:18
9.	"Just Got Word" (featuring YG)	Warren G	2:59
10.	"Damn Liar"	Certified Truck Bangers	4:21
11.	"Too Many Commas" (featuring Birdman)	Kenoe; Got Koke	3:27
12.	"Turn Up or Die" (featuring Lil Boosie)	Terry "T.A." Allen	3:39
13.	"All The Same" (featuring E-40)	DJ Mustard	3:17
14.	"Tonight" (featuring Trey Songz)	Mike WiLL Made It	3:50
15.	"Evil"	Will-A-Fool	3:16
16.	"Thank Me"	Lil Lody	3:12
17.	"Es El Mundo Outro"	Lil Lody	1:19
