= Perfect Ten (album) =

Studio album by Mustard
- Released: June 28, 2019
- Recorded: 2018–2019
- Genre: Hip hop
- Length: 32:10
- Label: 10 Summers; Interscope
- Producer: 1500 or Nothin'; Gylttryp; Justus West; Khaliel; Larry Jayy; Geronimo; Mustard; Official; Quintin Gulledge; Ryan Brown

Mustard chronology
| Cold Summer (2016) | Perfect Ten (2019) | Faith of a Mustard Seed (2024) |

Singles from Perfect Ten
- 1. "Pure Water" Released: January 16, 2019; 2. "100 Bands" Released: May 10, 2019; 3. "Ballin'" Released: August 20, 2019

Perfect Ten is the third studio album by American record producer Mustard, released on June 28, 2019, by 10 Summers Records and Interscope Records. It includes the singles "Pure Water", "100 Bands", and "Ballin'", which were Mustard's only hit songs as a solo act. By December 2019, the album was certified gold by the Recording Industry Association of America (RIAA) for sales of 500,000 album-equivalent units, and by November 2020, it received platinum certification — signifying 1,000,000 album-equivalent units.

It features collaborations from 1TakeJay, Migos, Quavo as a solo artist, YG, Tyga, ASAP Ferg, ASAP Rocky, Nav, Playboi Carti, A Boogie wit da Hoodie, Future, Young Thug, Gunna, Ty Dolla Sign, Ella Mai, Roddy Ricch, and the late Nipsey Hussle.

== Background ==
Mustard said that the album features "a lot of anthems" and that "all of [his] friends are on it". The cover is an image of Mustard as a child.

== Promotion ==
Mustard announced the album at the Power 106 Liftoff Edition concert festival on May 18, then on social media on May 21, 2019.

== Critical reception ==
Professional ratings
Review scores
| Source | Rating |
|---|---|
| AllMusic | 3.5/5 stars |

Fred Thomas of AllMusic gave the album 3.5 stars out of 5, calling the album "another vibrant exhibit of Mustard's gifts at arranging sounds that can start the party or spark deep feelings."

== Track listing ==
Perfect Ten track listing
| No. | Title | Writer(s) | Producer(s) | Length |
|---|---|---|---|---|
| 1. | "Intro" (featuring 1TakeJay) | Dijon McFarlane; Jachin Jenkins; Leslie Wakefield, Jr.; Carl E. Martin | Mustard; Official^{[a]} | 1:52 |
| 2. | "Pure Water" (with Migos) | McFarlane; Quavious Marshall; Kiari Cephus; Kirshnik Ball; Shah Rukh Zaman Khan | Mustard; GYLTTRYP^{[a]} | 3:12 |
| 3. | "On God" (with YG and Tyga featuring ASAP Ferg and ASAP Rocky) | McFarlane; Keenon Jackson; Michael Stevenson; Darold Ferguson, Jr.; Rakim Mayers; Khan | Mustard; GYLTTRYP^{[a]}; Quintin Gulledge^{[b]} | 4:23 |
| 4. | "Baguettes in the Face" (featuring Nav, Playboi Carti and A Boogie wit da Hoodie) | McFarlane; Navraj Goraya; Jordan Carter; Artist Dubose; Larry Sanders | Mustard; Larry Jayy^{[a]} | 2:54 |
| 5. | "Interstate 10" (featuring Future) | McFarlane; Nayvadius Wilburn; Khan; Justus West | Mustard; GYLTTRYP^{[a]}; West^{[b]} | 3:17 |
| 6. | "100 Bands" (album version; featuring Quavo, YG and Meek Mill) | McFarlane; Marshall; Jackson; Robert Williams; Wakefield, Jr. | Mustard; Official^{[c]} | 2:15 |
| 7. | "Woah Woah" (featuring Young Thug and Gunna) | McFarlane; Jeffery Williams; Sergio Kitchens; Gulledge; West | Mustard; 1500 or Nothin'^{[a]}; Khaliel^{[b]} | 3:51 |
| 8. | "Surface" (featuring Ty Dolla Sign and Ella Mai) | McFarlane; Tyrone Griffin, Jr.; Ella Howell; Khan; Nija Charles; Gulledge; Leon Huff; Kenneth Gamble; Kenneth Burke; Allan Felder; Norma Wright | Mustard; GYLTTRYP^{[a]}; Gulledge^{[b]} | 3:14 |
| 9. | "Ballin'" (with Roddy Ricch) | McFarlane; Rodrick Moore, Jr.; Khan; Danielle Jones | Mustard; GYLTTRYP^{[a]}; West^{[b]} | 3:00 |
| 10. | "Perfect Ten" (with Nipsey Hussle) | McFarlane; Ermias Asghedom; Gulledge; West | Mustard; 1500 or Nothin'^{[a]}; Ryan Brown^{[b]} | 4:12 |
| Total length: | | | | 32:10 |

Notes

- ^{^[a]} signifies a co-producer
- ^{^[b]} signifies an additional producer
- ^{^[c]} signifies an uncredited co-producer

Samples

- "Intro" samples "If I Ever Fall in Love" by Shai.
- "Ballin'" samples "Get It Together" by 702.

== Personnel ==
- David Pizzimenti – recording (tracks 1, 2, 3, 5, 7–10), mixing (tracks 1–3, 5, 7–10)
- Christian "CQ" Quinonez – recording (track 3)
- Pro Logic – recording (track 4)
- Roark Bailey – recording (track 4)
- Bryan Anzel – recording (track 5)
- Alex Tumay – recording (tracks 7)
- Chris Ascher – recording (track 8)
- James Royo – recording (track 8)
- Mustard – mixing (track 1, 3–5, 7–10)
- Dave Kutch – mastering (tracks 1–5, 7–10)

== Charts ==
=== Weekly charts ===
Weekly chart performance for Perfect Ten
| Chart (2019–2020) | Peak position |
|---|---|
| Australian Albums (ARIA) | 62 |
| Belgian Albums (Ultratop Flanders) | 129 |
| Canadian Albums (Billboard) | 8 |
| Dutch Albums (Album Top 100) | 66 |
| Latvian Albums (LAIPA) | 23 |
| Lithuanian Albums (AGATA) | 29 |
| New Zealand Albums (RMNZ) | 39 |
| Norwegian Albums (VG-lista) | 20 |
| Swedish Albums (Sverigetopplistan) | 36 |
| US Billboard 200 | 8 |
| US Top R&B/Hip-Hop Albums (Billboard) | 5 |

=== Year-end charts ===
Year-end chart performance for Perfect Ten
| Chart (2019) | Position |
|---|---|
| US Billboard 200 | 135 |
| US Top R&B/Hip-Hop Albums (Billboard) | 50 |
| Chart (2020) | Position |
| Swedish Albums (Sverigetopplistan) | 90 |
| US Billboard 200 | 77 |
| US Top R&B/Hip-Hop Albums (Billboard) | 47 |

== Certifications ==
Certifications for Perfect Ten
| Region | Certification | Certified units/sales |
|---|---|---|
| Denmark (IFPI Danmark) | Gold | 10,000^{‡} |
| United States (RIAA) | Platinum | 1,000,000^{‡} |
^{‡} Sales+streaming figures based on certification alone.
