= Pure Water (Mustard and Migos song) =

Single by Mustard and Migos

from the album Perfect Ten
- Released: January 16, 2019
- Recorded: 2018
- Genre: West Coast hip-hop; crunk
- Length: 3:14
- Label: 10 Summers; Interscope
- Songwriters: Dijon McFarlane; Kiari Kendrell Cephus; Kirsnick Khari Ball; Quavious Keyate Marshall
- Producers: Mustard; Gylttryp

Mustard singles chronology
"Anywhere" (2018)	"Pure Water" (2019)	"100 Bands" (2019)

Migos singles chronology
"Hot Summer" (2018)	"Pure Water" (2019)	"Stripper Bowl" (2019)

Music video
- "Pure Water" on YouTube

"Pure Water" is a song by American producer Mustard and American hip hop trio Migos, released as a single on January 16, 2019. It reached the top 40 on the Billboard Hot 100 and the top 20 of the Canadian Hot 100. It was ranked 20th on Billboard's Best Songs of 2019 list and Complex named it the 33rd best song of the year.

== Critical reception ==
Stereogum said that the beat has "the crisp, snapping West Coast minimalism that made Mustard the producer of the moment half a decade ago" and called the squealing melodic loop reminiscent of "prime crunk-era Lil Jon".

== Charts ==
=== Weekly charts ===
Chart (2019)	Peak position
Australia (ARIA)	45
Canada Hot 100 (Billboard)	20
Ireland (IRMA)	56
Latvia (LAIPA)	25
New Zealand Hot Singles (RMNZ)	8
Slovakia Singles Digital (ČNS IFPI)	92
Sweden Heatseeker (Sverigetopplistan)	3
UK Singles (OCC)	62
UK Hip Hop/R&B (OCC)	37
US Billboard Hot 100	23
US Hot R&B/Hip-Hop Songs (Billboard)	10
US Rhythmic Airplay (Billboard)	1
US Rolling Stone Top 100	25

=== Year-end charts ===
Chart (2019)	Position
Canada (Canadian Hot 100)	51
US Billboard Hot 100	55
US Hot R&B/Hip-Hop Songs (Billboard)	24
US Rhythmic (Billboard)	14
US Rolling Stone Top 100	31

== Certifications ==
Region	Certification	Certified units/sales
Brazil (Pro-Música Brasil)	Platinum	40,000^{‡}
Denmark (IFPI Danmark)	Platinum	90,000^{‡}
Italy (FIMI)	Gold	50,000^{‡}
New Zealand (RMNZ)	2× Platinum	60,000^{‡}
Poland (ZPAV)	Gold	25,000^{‡}
Portugal (AFP)	Gold	5,000^{‡}
United Kingdom (BPI)	Gold	400,000^{‡}
United States (RIAA)	5× Platinum	5,000,000^{‡}
^{‡} Sales+streaming figures based on certification alone.
