= Mustard (music producer) =

American record producer (born 1990)

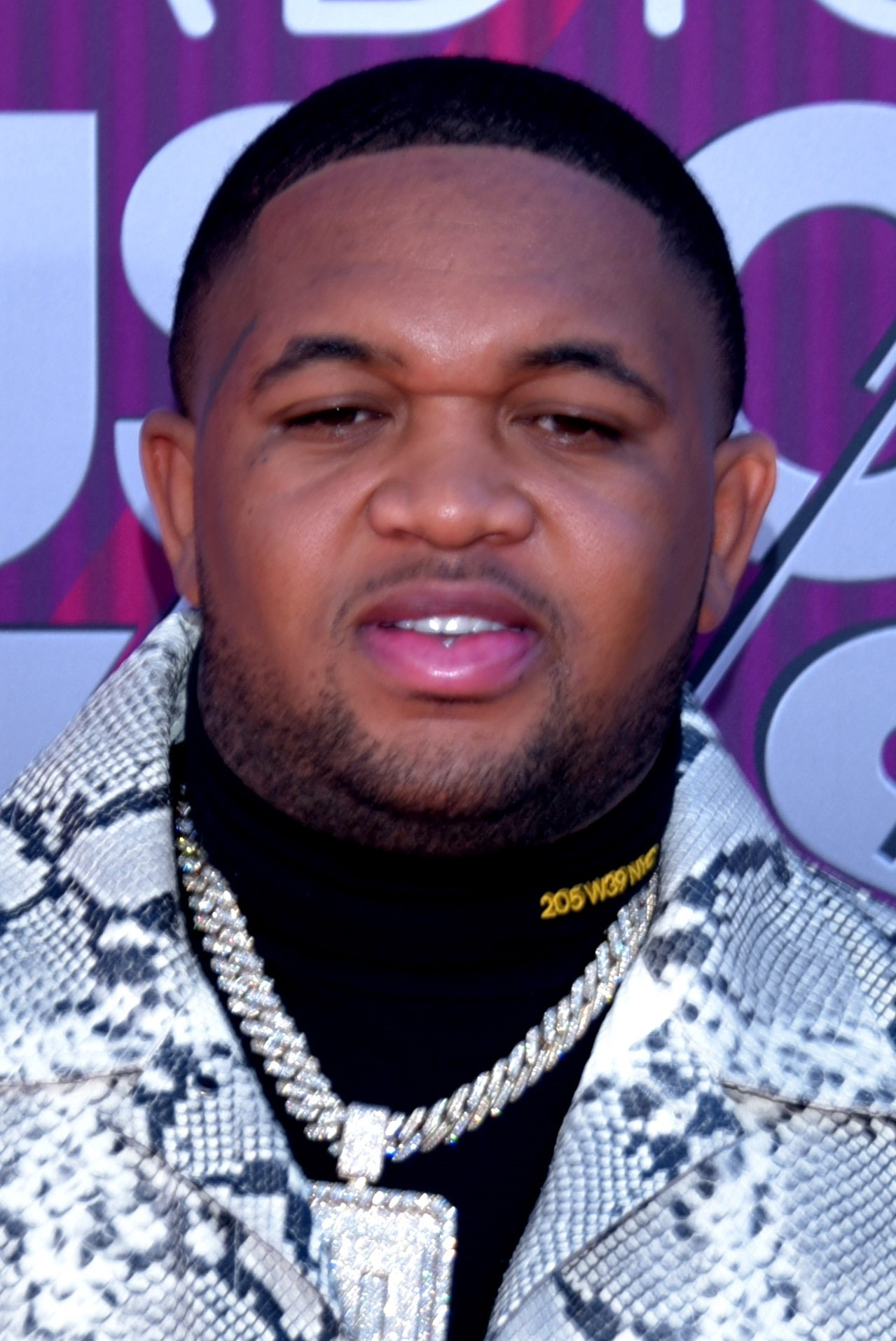
- Mustard in 2019

Background information
- Also known as: DJ Mustard
- Born: Dijon Isaiah McFarlane; June 5, 1990 (age 36); Los Angeles, California, U.S.
- Genres: Hip-hop; trap; R&B
- Occupations: Record producer; disc jockey; songwriter; music executive
- Works: Production discography
- Years active: 2009–present
- Labels: Interscope; Roc Nation; 10 Summers; Republic; Pushaz Ink; Thump; BMG
- Spouse: Chanel Thierry (m. 2020; div. 2023)
- Children: 4
- Website: www.foams.world

Dijon Isaiah McFarlane (born June 5, 1990), known professionally as Mustard (formerly DJ Mustard), is an American record producer. A frequent collaborator of fellow California-based artists YG and Ty Dolla Sign, he began his career producing singles and albums for both rappers, and has since done so for other acts in hip-hop and R&B. He first saw recognition for having produced Tyga's 2011 single "Rack City".

Mustard's production style has been described as up-tempo and club-oriented, but also rudimentary and melodic. Most of his works begin or end with the producer tag "Mustard on the beat, ho!"—a voice sample of YG (who says it at the end of "I'm Good", one of their early collaborations)—and include heavy use of synthesizers, claps, and frequent, reverberated use of a "hey!" voice clip. He has been credited as influential in the sound of both mainstream and West Coast hip-hop productions during the early-to-mid 2010s, a style he refers to as "ratchet music".

Mustard signed with Republic Records and Roc Nation to release his debut studio album, 10 Summers (2014), which narrowly entered the Billboard 200; his second album, Cold Summer (2016), failed to chart. He then signed with Interscope Records to release his third album, Perfect Ten (2019), which peaked within the top ten of the chart and spawned the Billboard Hot 100-top 40 singles "Ballin'" (featuring Roddy Ricch) and "Pure Water" (with Migos). He produced Kendrick Lamar's 2024 single "Not Like Us", which became his first production to peak atop the Billboard Hot 100, won five Grammy Awards, and foresaw the release of Mustard's fourth album, Faith of a Mustard Seed (2024). He founded the record label 10 Summers Records in 2014, through which he has signed musical acts including British singer Ella Mai, as well as fellow California-based artists Kiana Ledé and RJMrLA.

== Early life ==
Dijon Isaiah McFarlane was born on June 5, 1990, in Los Angeles, California. In a 2013 interview with The Fader magazine, he stated that his father was deported when he was young and that his father was currently residing in Jamaica. They were still able to maintain contact with each other.

When McFarlane was 11 years old, his uncle, Tyrei Lacy, who was both a parental figure and a DJ, let him DJ at a family party. Soon thereafter he was spinning records at parties as a student at Dorsey High. He began DJing more as he got older, and became much more skilled at the craft which led to him DJing at the local clubs. McFarlane was baptized when he was 12 and became interested in Christianity.

His stage name refers to the condiment Dijon mustard.

== Career ==
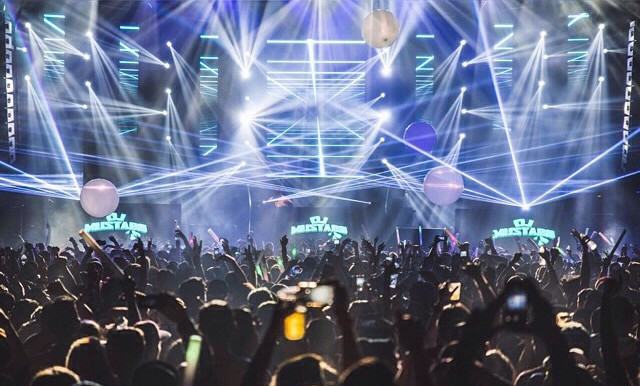
A DJ Mustard concert

In an interview with Sway's Universe, DJ Mustard described his business relationship with West coast rapper YG. Since YG's second mixtape The Real 4Fingaz, he has produced on all of his mixtapes. "I started making beats for YG; he was one [of] the first people to do my beats. I started with him, so for us to do a mixtape was easy. We created this dancing sound. I feel like we owed it to the streets and we're not stopping." DJ Mustard has produced singles by YG such as "Snitches Ain't Shit" featuring rappers Tyga and Nipsey Hussle, and "You Broke" also featuring Nipsey Hussle. During 2010, DJ Mustard released an unofficial compilation album with various artists through the label Thump Records that was called Let's Jerk named after the street dance called jerking in Los Angeles.

During late 2011, DJ Mustard produced Tyga's third single "Rack City" from his second album Careless World: Rise of the Last King. The song was released in December 2011, and peaked at number 7 on the Billboard Hot 100 chart, number 1 on the Hot R&B/Hip-Hop Songs chart, and number 2 on the Hot Rap Songs chart. It was also certified 2× platinum by the RIAA. According to Mustard, the beat for the song was originally for YG. YG told Mustard that Tyga needed a beat, so he sent the beat to Tyga. DJ Mustard's career was given a huge blast from the song. He also produced two tracks from Tyga's mixtape Well Done 3, the third installment of his Well Done series and his song "Hit Em Up" featuring rapper Jadakiss from his third album Hotel California, released on April 9, 2013.

During 2012, DJ Mustard produced Atlanta rapper 2 Chainz's song "I'm Different" that was released as the third single from his major debut album Based on a T.R.U. Story on November 8. The song charted at number 6 on the Hot R&B/Hip-Hop Songs chart and was certified gold by the RIAA, selling over 500,000 copies digitally. Also later in 2012, DJ Mustard produced the song R.I.P. by Atlanta rapper Jeezy that was released as the lead single from his twelfth mixtape It's tha World on February 5, 2013. The song features 2 Chainz, making this the second time he has rapped over Mustard's beats since "I'm Different". The song charted at number 17 on the Hot R&B/Hip-Hop Songs chart. Mustard has also produced tracks on rapper Bow Wow's seventh album Underrated such as "We In Da Club" which was released as the second single from that album. However, as stated by Bow Wow in 2012, the album has been indefinitely been delayed and he is no longer focusing on it.

On June 3, 2013, DJ Mustard released his official debut mixtape, Ketchup. The mixtape contained guest appearances from artists such as Lil Snupe, YG, Ty$, Joe Moses, Kid Ink, Nipsey Hussle, Casey Veggies, Ca$h Out, Clyde Carson, Dorrough, Dom Kennedy, and Lil Jon. Later in June, Mustard produced Atlanta rapper B.o.B's song HeadBand featuring 2 Chainz, which was released as the second single from his third studio album Underground Luxury. The song has charted at number 21 on the Hot R&B/Hip-Hop Songs chart. On September 17, DJ Mustard produced West coast rapper Kid Ink's song "Show Me" featuring Chris Brown, released as the first single from his upcoming second studio album My Own Lane. The single peaked at number 1 on the U.S. Rhythmic Billboard Chart. On September 17, 2013, DJ Mustard produced YG's mega-anthem "My Nigga" for his debut studio album "My Krazy Life", which peaked at number 5 on the U.S. Rhythmic Billboard chart. On November 18, 2013, DJ Mustard announced that he had signed to Jay-Z's Roc Nation as an artist, and revealed plans to release his own studio album. On December 18, 2013, he was named the runner-up for producer of the year by HipHopDX. On March 11, 2014, DJ Mustard produced Kid Ink's "Main Chick" also featuring Chris Brown for his second studio album My Own Lane. It peaked at number 3 on the U.S. Rhythmic Billboard chart. During 2014, DJ Mustard produced several other hit singles, including Tinashe’s commercial debut single, "2 On".

In 2016, worked with Trea Fittz on his debut album, released October 11. He released "Don't Hurt Me" with Jeremih and Nicki Minaj on his album Cold Summer. The album included long-time collaborators YG and Ty Dolla Sign. The album also included Rick Ross, Jeezy, K Camp, and more. It was released on September 30, 2016.

On June 28, 2019, Mustard's third album, Perfect Ten was released, and spawned the Grammy-nominated single, "Ballin'.

In February 2023, Mustard was announced as part of the voice cast in the animated sports comedy film Sneaks.

In 2024, Mustard produced the Kendrick Lamar diss track, "Not Like Us", released as part of the Drake–Kendrick Lamar feud. He also co-produced two tracks on Lamar's 2024 album GNX, "Hey Now" and "TV Off". Lamar's screaming of Mustard's name on "TV Off" became an internet meme. He appeared during Lamar's performance of the song at the Super Bowl LIX halftime show.

On April 1, 2025, Mustard was officially announced as the opening act of the Kendrick Lamar and SZA co-headlining Grand National Tour, with his own set list.

== Production style ==
Ratchet music
- Stylistic origins: Hyphy; trap
- Cultural origins: 2010s, United States
- Typical instruments: Vocals; digital audio workstation

Fusion genres
- RnBass

Mustard's production style has been described as an up-tempo, radio-friendly, club-oriented, catchy hip-hop style which he calls "ratchet music". His body of work has been recognized by critics as sonically cohesive and recognizable in that many of his tracks have recurring, identifiable motifs. Most apparent is his producer signature "Mustard on that beat, ho!" which prefaces the beat drop in many of his songs. This signature is often strategically placed to span the third and fourth counts of the measure preceding the song's drop to make it more catchy. The producer tag is a sample from YG's song "I'm Good". The tag has also appeared in songs by Ty Dolla $ign, Tyga, Young Jeezy, and Kendrick Lamar. On a compositional level, however, Mustard's motifs also include: an ambient chant of "Hey!" on the off-beats in the background of his music; the emphasized, minimalist bass synth opening to many songs (most notably on "My Nigga", "R.I.P.", and "Rack City"), 808 kicks and the use of crisp hand-claps and snap-snares.

Mustard uses the music production software Reason, first using 5, 6 and currently using 6.5. In an interview with The Fader magazine he stated, "With this ratchet music, I'm trying to create my own sound. I want to make this to where it can't leave, this is something that everybody's gonna get used to. Like how everybody got used to Lil Jon or Luke. I don't want it to be something that comes and goes, I want it to be something that's here forever like a real culture."

As a result of the recognizably and commonality between many of Mustard's chart-topping singles, a number of artists who employ production similar to DJ Mustard's have been criticized for lack of originality and plagiarism. In a July 2014 interview with Tim Westwood, the rapper YG, whose album My Krazy Life was mostly produced by Mustard, stated that Iggy Azalea's song "Fancy" 'jocked' Mustard's style. Like many of Mustard's songs, the song includes a minimalist G-funk style synth and samples a layered "Hey" voice chant. He has been compared to rap producers like Dr Dre and many old rappers from the golden age of hip hop.

== Personal life ==
Mustard started dating Chanel Thierry in 2009 and they were married on October 10, 2020. They have two sons and a daughter. They separated in 2022 and divorced in 2023. He filed for sole custody of their children in 2024, after which she accused him of attempting to "destroy [her] name" in an effort to avoid paying child support.

In July 2024, Mustard welcomed his fourth child, a daughter, with girlfriend Brittany Stroud.

== Discography ==
=== Studio albums ===
List of albums, with selected chart positions
Title	Album details	Peak chart positions							Certifications
Title	Album details	US	US R&B/HH	US Rap	AUS	CAN	NOR	NZ	Certifications
10 Summers	Released: August 11, 2014; Label: Pu$haz Ink, Roc Nation, Republic; Format: CD, digital download, streaming	143	20	14	—	—	—	—	
Cold Summer	Released: September 16, 2016; Label: Pu$haz Ink, Roc Nation, Republic; Format: CD, digital download, streaming	—	24	14	—	—	—	—	
Perfect Ten	Released: June 28, 2019; Label: 10 Summers, Interscope; Format: CD (Limited), digital download, streaming	8	5	3	62	8	25	39	RIAA: Platinum
Faith of a Mustard Seed	Released: July 26, 2024; Label: 10 Summers, BMG; Formats: CD, digital download, streaming	50	11	10	—	—	—	—	
Perfect Eleven	Released: TBA; Label: 10 Summers, BMG; Formats: Digital download, streaming	TBA	TBA	TBA	TBA	TBA	TBA	TBA	
"—" denotes a recording that did not chart or was not released in that territory.

=== Mixtapes ===
List of mixtapes, with selected details
Title	Album details
Ketchup	Released: June 3, 2013; Label: Self-released; Formats: Digital download
10 Summers: The Mixtape Vol.1 (with 10 Summers)	Released: July 23, 2015; Label: 10 Summers; Formats: Digital download

=== Singles ===
==== As lead artist ====
List of songs, with selected chart positions, showing year released and album name
Title	Year	Peak chart positions										Certifications	Album
Title	Year	US	US R&B/HH	US Rap	AUS	BEL (FL)	CAN	IRE	NZ Hot	UK	WW	Certifications	Album
"Money" (featuring TeeCee4800)	2013	—	—	—	—	—	—	—	—	—	—		Non-album single
"Throw It Up" (with Tyga)	2013	—	—	—	—	—	—	—	—	—	—		Well Done IV
"This D" (with TeeFLii)	2013	—	—	—	—	—	—	—	—	—	—		Annieruo'tay
"Vato" (featuring YG, Jeezy and Que)	2014	—	—	—	—	—	—	—	—	—	—		Non-album single
"Down on Me" (featuring Ty Dolla Sign and 2 Chainz)	2014	—	—	—	—	—	—	—	—	—	—		10 Summers
"Why'd You Call" (featuring Ty Dolla Sign and ILoveMakonnen)	2015	—	—	—	—	—	—	—	—	—	—		Non-album single
"In My Room" (with Yellow Claw featuring Ty Dolla Sign and Tyga)	2015	—	—	—	—	99	—	—	—	—	—	RIAA: Gold	Blood for Mercy
"Whole Lotta Lovin" (with Travis Scott)	2016	— (Note: "Whole Lotta Lovin'" did not enter the Billboard Hot 100, but peaked at number eighteen on the Bubbling Under Hot 100 chart.)	38	—	—	—	—	—	—	—	—	RIAA: Gold	Non-album single
"Don't Hurt Me" (featuring Nicki Minaj and Jeremih)	2016	—	— (Note: "Don't Hurt Me" did not enter the Hot R&B/Hip-Hop Songs chart, but peaked at number nine on the Bubbling Under R&B/Hip-Hop Singles chart.)	—	20	—	—	—	—	—	—	RIAA: Gold; RMNZ: Gold	Cold Summer
"Want Her" (featuring Quavo and YG)	2017	—	—	—	—	—	—	—	—	—	—	RIAA: Gold; RMNZ: Gold	Cold Summer
"Anywhere" (with Nick Jonas)	2018	—	—	—	—	—	—	—	—	—	—		Non-album singles
"Dangerous World" (featuring Travis Scott and YG)	2018	—	—	—	—	—	—	—	—	—	—		Non-album singles
"Pure Water" (with Migos)	2019	23	10	8	45	—	20	56	—	62	—	RIAA: 5× Platinum; BPI: Gold; RMNZ: 2× Platinum	Perfect Ten
"100 Bands" (featuring Quavo, 21 Savage, YG and Meek Mill)	2019	— (Note: "100 Bands" did not enter the Billboard Hot 100, but peaked at number twenty-five on the Bubbling Under Hot 100 chart.)	—	—	—	—	—	—	29	—	—	RIAA: Gold	Perfect Ten
"Ballin'" (with Roddy Ricch)	2019	11	4	3	72	—	34	42	—	37	—	RIAA: 7× Platinum; ARIA: Platinum; BPI: Platinum; MC: Platinum; RMNZ: 3× Platinum	Perfect Ten
"Parking Lot" (with Travis Scott)	2024	57	17	15	—	—	49	—	5	83	74	RIAA: Gold	Faith of a Mustard Seed
"Pray for Me"	2024	—	—	—	—	—	—	—	—	—	—		Faith of a Mustard Seed
"—" denotes a recording that did not chart or was not released in that territory.

==== As featured artist ====
List of songs, with selected chart positions, showing year released and album name
Title	Year	Peak chart positions									Certifications	Album
Title	Year	US	US R&B/HH	US Rap	AUS	BEL (FL)	CAN	IRE	NZ Hot	UK	Certifications	Album
"Feelin' Myself" (will.i.am featuring Miley Cyrus, French Montana, Wiz Khalifa and DJ Mustard)	2013	96	26	15	34	—	—	3	16	2	BPI: Platinum; RMNZ: Platinum	#willpower
"Left, Right" (YG featuring DJ Mustard)	2013	—	44	—	—	—	—	—	—	—	RIAA: Gold	My Krazy Life
"Or Nah" (Ty Dolla Sign featuring The Weeknd,Wiz Khalifa and DJ Mustard)	2014	48	12	—	—	48	78	—	—	—	RIAA: Diamond; BPI: Platinum; MC: 2× Platinum; RMNZ: 3× Platinum	Beach House EP
"Heartless" (Polo G featuring Mustard)	2019	— (Note: "By Yourself" did not enter the Billboard Hot 100, but peaked at number three on the Bubbling Under Hot 100 chart.)	—	—	—	—	—	—	—	—	RIAA: 3× Platinum; BPI: Silver; MC: 2× Platinum; RMNZ: Gold	The Goat
"High Fashion" (Roddy Ricch featuring Mustard)	2020	20	12	7	48	—	30	48	25	45	RIAA: 4× Platinum; ARIA: Gold; BPI: Gold; MC: Platinum; RMNZ: Platinum	Please Excuse Me for Being Antisocial
"By Yourself" (Ty Dolla Sign featuring Jhené Aiko and Mustard)	2021	— (Note: "By Yourself" did not enter the Billboard Hot 100, but peaked at number sixteen on the Bubbling Under Hot 100 chart.)	—	—	—	—	—	—	30	—		Featuring Ty Dolla Sign
"—" denotes a recording that did not chart or was not released in that territory.

==== Promotional singles ====
Song, showing year released and album name
Title	Year	Album
"One Bad Decision" (featuring Ella Mai and Roddy Ricch)	2024	Faith of a Mustard Seed

=== Other charted songs ===
List of other charted songs, with selected chart positions, showing year released and album name
Title	Year	Peak chart positions				Certifications	Album
Title	Year	US	US R&B/HH	CAN	NZ Hot	Certifications	Album
"On God" (with YG and Tyga featuring ASAP Ferg and ASAP Rocky)	2019	—	—	—	30		Perfect Ten
"Baguettes in the Face" (featuring Nav, Playboi Carti, and A Boogie wit da Hoodie)	2019	81	33	47	18	RIAA: Platinum; BPI: Silver; RMNZ: Platinum	Perfect Ten
"Still Chose You" (The Kid Laroi featuring Mustard)	2021	100	38	65	30		F*ck Love 3: Over You

== Filmography ==
=== Film ===
Year	Title	Role	Ref.
2025	Sneaks	Marcel and Himself (voices)	

== Accolades ==
Organization	Year	Category	Nominated work(s)	Result	Ref.
Grammy Awards	2019	Song of the Year	"Boo'd Up"	Nominated	
Grammy Awards	2019	Best R&B Song	"Boo'd Up"	Won	
Grammy Awards	2020	Best Rap/Sung Collaboration	"Ballin'"	Nominated	
Grammy Awards	2025	Record of the Year	"Not Like Us"	Won	
Grammy Awards	2025	Producer of the Year, Non-Classical	Himself	Nominated	
Grammy Awards	2026	Best Rap Song	"tv off"	Won	
iHeartRadio Music Awards	2021	Hip-Hop Song of the Year	"High Fashion"	Nominated	
Soul Train Music Awards	2016	The Ashford & Simpson Songwriter's Award	"Needed Me"	Nominated	
