= Wolfpack Party =

Studio album by The Pack
- Released: August 24, 2010
- Genre: Hip-hop; frat rap; hyphy
- Length: 69:10
- Label: SMC; Indie Pop
- Producer: The Pack (exec.); Will Bronson (exec.); Cyrano (of The Cataracs); DecadeZ; Lil B; Young L

The Pack chronology
Based Boys (2007)	Wolfpack Party (2010)

Professional ratings
Review scores
Source	Rating
AllMusic	3/5 stars
Spin	7/10 stars
Pitchfork	5.7/10

Wolfpack Party is the second and final studio album by the Bay Area rap group the Pack. It was released on August 24, 2010, through SMC Recordings and Indie Pop.

== Background and release ==
The Pack was formed in Berkeley, California in 2005, and consisted of four rappers: Lil B, Young L, Stunnaman, and Lil Uno. They are best known for their 2006 breakout hit "Vans". The Pack released their debut EP Skateboards 2 Scrapers in 2006, and their debut album Based Boys the following year. Leading up to the release of Wolfpack Party, Lil B embarked on a solo career and overshadowed the Pack. Wolfpack Party was released on August 24, 2010, through SMC Recordings/Indie Pop.

== Composition ==
Wolfpack Party is a hip hop album. Spin magazine's Ben Detrick wrote that the album "sounds as if Bay Area hyphy, Spank Rock, and Euro-trance were muddled in Seth Brundle’s telepod."

== Track listing ==
Writing and production credits adapted from liner notes.

No.	Title	Writer(s)	Producer(s)	Length
1.	"Bass Remix III"	L. Omadhebo; D. Johnson; K. Jenkins	Young L	2:19
2.	"Wolfpack Party"	B. McCartney; L. Omadhebo; K. Jenkins; D. Johnson; N. Hollowell-Dhar	Cyrano (of The Cataracs)	4:09
3.	"Dance Floor" (featuring Dev)	L. Omadhebo; K. Jenkins; B. McCartney; D. Johnson; N. Hollowell-Dhar; D. Vine	Young L; Lil B (co.)	3:38
4.	"Red Light"	L. Omadhebo; K. Jenkins; D. Johnson	Young L	4:11
5.	"Sex on the Beach" (featuring Dev)	B. McCartney; L. Omadhebo; D. Johnson; K. Jenkins; N. Hollowell-Dhar	Cyrano (of The Cataracs)	2:56
6.	"Superman"	K. Jenkins; B. McCartney; L. Omadhebo; D. Johnson; A.M. Turner	DecadeZ	4:30
7.	"Bend That Corner" (featuring Husalah)	L. Omadhebo; D. Johnson; J. Ratliff	Young L	4:21
8.	"Drunk Off Money"	K. Jenkins; L. Omadhebo; D. Johnson	Young L	4:10
9.	"E.T."	D. Johnson; L. Omadhebo; B. McCartney	Young L	2:57
10.	"Aye!"	D. Johnson; B. McCartney; K. Jenkins; L. Omadhebo; N. Hollowell-Dhar	Cyrano (of The Cataracs)	2:23
11.	"Front Back"	B. McCartney; L. Omadhebo; D. Johnson; K. Jenkins	Young L	4:18
12.	"Make Me Cum"	L. Omadhebo; D. Johnson; K. Jenkins; B. McCartney	Young L	3:02
13.	"One U Need"	L. Omadhebo; K. Jenkins; B. McCartney	Young L	3:27
14.	"Stuntin' When I Roll Up"	L. Omadhebo; D. Johnson; K. Jenkins	Young L	3:34
15.	"Booty Bounce" (featuring Mistah F.A.B., D-Lo & Sleepy D)	B. McCartney; L. Omadhebo; K. Jenkins; S. Cox Jr.; D. Porter	Young L	3:45
16.	"Worried Bout Mine"	K. Jenkins; L. Omadhebo; D. Johnson	Young L	5:02

Japanese deluxe edition bonus tracks
No.	Title	Producer(s)	Length
17.	"Basedboys"	Young L	3:16
18.	"80's Baby" (featuring Tokyo)	Young L	3:38
19.	"Titties"	Young L	3:34
