= Based Boys =

Studio album by The Pack
- Released: October 30, 2007
- Studio: Various
- Genres: Hip-hop; hyphy; West Coast hip-hop
- Length: 64:33
- Labels: Up All Nite; Jive; Rawkus; Zomba
- Producers: Billy Hume; Mr. Collipark; Pit; The Replacement Killers; Traxamillion; Young L

The Pack chronology
Skateboards 2 Scrapers (2006)	Based Boys (2007)	Wolfpack Party (2010)

Based Boys is the debut studio album by American hip-hop group the Pack. It was released on October 30, 2007, through Up All Nite, an imprint of Jive Records, Rawkus and Zomba Records. It follows the group's breakout hit "Vans" and debut EP Skateboards 2 Scrapers, which were released in 2006.

A hip-hop and hyphy album, Based Boys consists of 17 songs, including 4 bonus tracks. It received mixed reviews from critics, who considered it unoriginal and repetitive, however the production by Young L was often praised. Upon the album's release, it was deemed a commercial failure, and the Pack were dropped from their label.

== Background and release ==
The Pack was formed in Berkeley, California in 2005, and consisted of four rappers: Lil B, Young L, Stunnaman, and Lil Uno. Following the success of their 2006 breakout hit "Vans", the Pack released their debut EP Skateboards 2 Scrapers on December 19 of that same year. Leading up to the release of Based Boys, the group said that it "evolved from 'Vans'". The album was released on October 30, 2007, via rapper Too Short's Jive Records imprint Up All Nite, along with Rawkus and Zomba Records. It was deemed a commercial failure, and the group was dropped from their record labels.

== Production ==
The majority of the production and recording on The Pack was done by Young L, along with several other tracks produced by Hume, Mr. Collipark, the Replacement Killers, Traxamillion, and Pit. "Backseat" features guitar recordings from Mike Hartnett, while a remix version of "The Milky Way" features additional production from Evan Taubenfield. The Pack was recorded in five studios and mixed in three studios in California and Georgia.

== Composition ==
Based Boys is a hip-hop and hyphy album consisting of 17 tracks, including four bonus tracks. The opening track, "Rumble", was called a fight song by Billboard's Chuck Eddy. He also described the song's beat as "an early Schoolly D-style clang rhythm". The following tracks "I Look Good" and "In My Car" see the Pack rapping about how they and their car look good. On the latter song, the final verse is rapped by Lil Uno, who delivers it without rhyming any lines. The sixth song, "The Milky Way", features production from Mr. Collipark, and has themes of astronomy. The following track "Rock N Roll" was produced by the Replacement Killers and is the only non-hyphy song on the album. The fifteenth song, "Candy", contains an interpolation of Lesley Gore's 1963 song "It's My Party". The final track is "Vans", which is a song about the American skateboarding shoe brand Vans.

== Critical reception ==
Professional ratings
Review scores
Source	Rating
AllMusic	2/5 stars
RapReviews	6/10

Based Boys received mixed reviews. Critics called it simple and accessible rap, and many felt that the album was repetitive and unoriginal. Young L's production was often praised; Spin magazine's Charles Aaron wrote that aside from the production, the group failed to stand out among the Bay Area hyphy scene. Writing for RapReviews, Pedro Hernandez said he disliked that the Pack mostly stuck to hyphy music but stated that "they just do their thing and do it well."

== Track listing ==
All tracks are written by Brandon McCartney, DaMonte Johnson, Keith Jenkins and Lloyd Omadhebo, and produced by Young L, except where noted.

No.	Title	Writer(s)	Producer(s)	Length
1.	"Rumble"			4:36
2.	"I Look Good"			3:14
3.	"In My Car"			3:32
4.	"My Girl Gotta Girl Too"			3:40
5.	"Gimme Racks"			6:09
6.	"The Milky Way"	McCartney; Johnson; Jenkins; Omadhebo; Michael Crooms; Billy Hume	Mr. Collipark; Hume^{[a]}	3:03
7.	"Rock N Roll"	McCartney; Johnson; Jenkins; Omadhebo; Anthony Martini; Harvey Miller; Paul Laurence	The Replacement Killers	4:28
8.	"In the Club"			4:10
9.	"Club Stuntin'"	McCartney; Johnson; Jenkins; Omadhebo; Sultan Banks	Traxamillion	4:06
10.	"At the Club"			3:15
11.	"Booty Bounce Bopper" (featuring Main Affiliate)	McCartney; Jenkins; Omadhebo; Nile LeBlanc		3:52
12.	"Fly"			4:00
13.	"Backseat"	McCartney; Johnson; Jenkins; Omadhebo; Jason Pittman; Mike Hartnett	Pit	3:10

Bonus tracks
No.	Title	Writer(s)	Producer(s)	Length
14.	"The Milky Way (Remix)" (featuring Kaya)	McCartney; Johnson; Jenkins; Omadhebo; Crooms; Hume; Evan Taubenfeld	Mr. Collipark; Hume^{[a]}; Taubenfeld^{[b]}	2:44
15.	"Candy"			2:41
16.	"I'm Shinin'"			3:45
17.	"Vans"			4:15
Total length:				64:40

Notes

- ^{^[a]} signifies a co-producer
- ^{^[b]} signifies an additional producer
- "Backseat" features guitar from Mike Hartnett
- "Rock N Roll" contains a sample of "Rock Me Tonight (For Old Times Sake)", written by Paul Laurence and performed by Freddie Jackson.

== Credits and personnel ==
Credits are adapted from the album's liner notes.

Studios

- Recorded at Young L Productions Studio, Albany, CA (tracks 1–5, 8–12, 15–17)
- Recorded at Doppler Studios, Atlanta, GA (track 6–7)
- Recorded at the Zone Studios, Norcross, GA (track 6)
- Recorded at 11th Street Studios, Atlanta, GA (track 13)
- Recorded at Big Evil Corp. Studios, Santa Monica, CA (track 14)
- Mixed at Patchwerk Studios, Atlanta, GA (tracks 1–5, 7–9, 11–12, 15, 17)
- Mixed at the Zone Studios, Atlanta, GA (track 6, 13–14)
- Mixed at Visions Audio, Berkeley, CA (track 10)

Musicians

- Young L – production (tracks 1–5, 8, 10–13, 15–17)
- Hume – production (tracks 6, 14)
- Mr. Collipark – production (track 6, 14)
- The Replacement Killers – production (track 7)
- Traxamillion – production (track 9)
- Pit – production (track 13)
- Mike Hartnett – guitars (13)
- Evan Taubenfield – additional production (track 14)

Technicians

- Young L – recording (tracks 1–5, 8–12, 15–17); mixing (track 16)
- Leslie Brathwaite – mixing (tracks 1–5, 7–9, 11–12, 15, 17)
- Justin Trawick – assistant (tracks 1–5, 7–9, 12)
- Rob Skipworth – recording (track 6–7)
- Billy Hume – recording (track 6); mixing (track 13–14)
- Aaron J. Holton – recording (track 7)
- D-Wiz – mixing (track 10)
- Steve Fisher – recording (track 13)
- Adam LaRossa – assistant (track 13)
- Evan Taubenfield – recording (track 14)
- Kevin Kadish – assistant (track 14)
- Kori Anders – assistant (track 15, 17)
