= Let's Go Brandon =

American political slogan coined in 2021

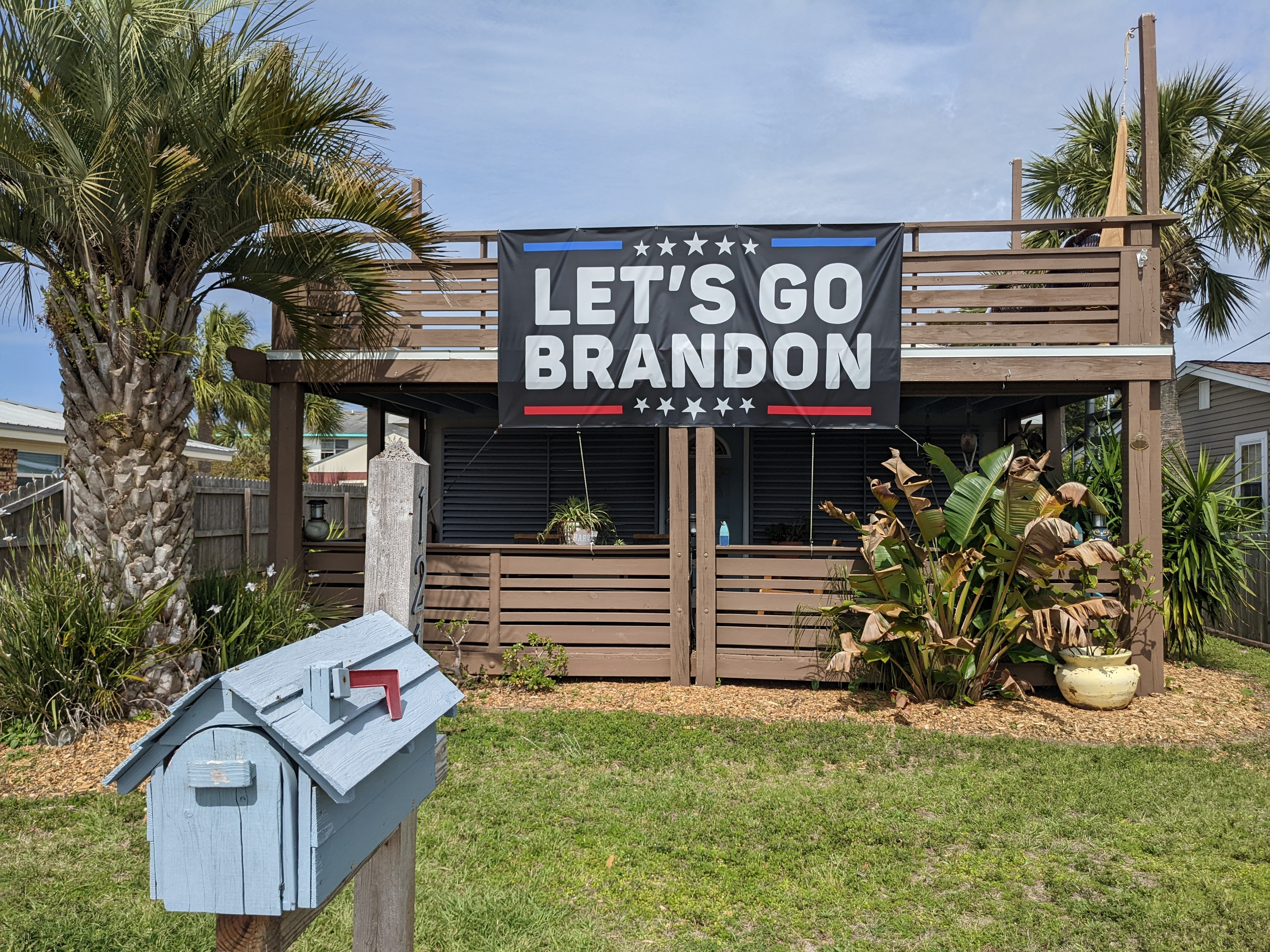
- A "Let's Go Brandon" sign outside a Florida residence
- Origin: NBC Sports interview from the 2021 Sparks 300 after Brandon Brown's first career win
- Original form: Fuck Joe Biden
- Context: Biden's administration as 46th president of the United States
- Coined by: Kelli Stavast
- Meaning: Opposition to the Presidency of Joe Biden

"Let's Go Brandon" is a political slogan and Internet meme used as a euphemism for the phrase "Fuck Joe Biden" in reference to former U.S. president Joe Biden.

Chants of "Fuck Joe Biden" began during sporting events in early September 2021. On October 2, 2021, during a televised interview with the Sparks 300 race winner Brandon Brown at Talladega Superspeedway in Talladega, Alabama, NBC Sports reporter Kelli Stavast incorrectly interpreted the chant in the background as "Let's Go Brandon", which sparked the meme. The slogan has become well known through use by Republican Party politicians and critics of Biden. The phrase quickly spread to popular culture, with rap songs using the phrase placing high on record charts.

== Origins ==
=== Background: Anti-Biden chants ===
In early September 2021, chants of "Fuck Joe Biden" were reported to have broken out in several college football games in the Southern United States. Later that month, the phenomenon spread to other universities, including the University of Wyoming. Similar anti-Biden chants took place during the September 2021 Ryder Cup.

The Washington Examiner reported that "Fuck Joe Biden" was chanted by some attendees at a Megadeth concert in September 2021, and at an October 2021 protest in response to a vaccine mandate for educators in New York City.

=== Initial use ===
The portion of the Brandon Brown interview in which the crowd chants "Fuck Joe Biden", and the interviewer says, "Let's go, Brandon"

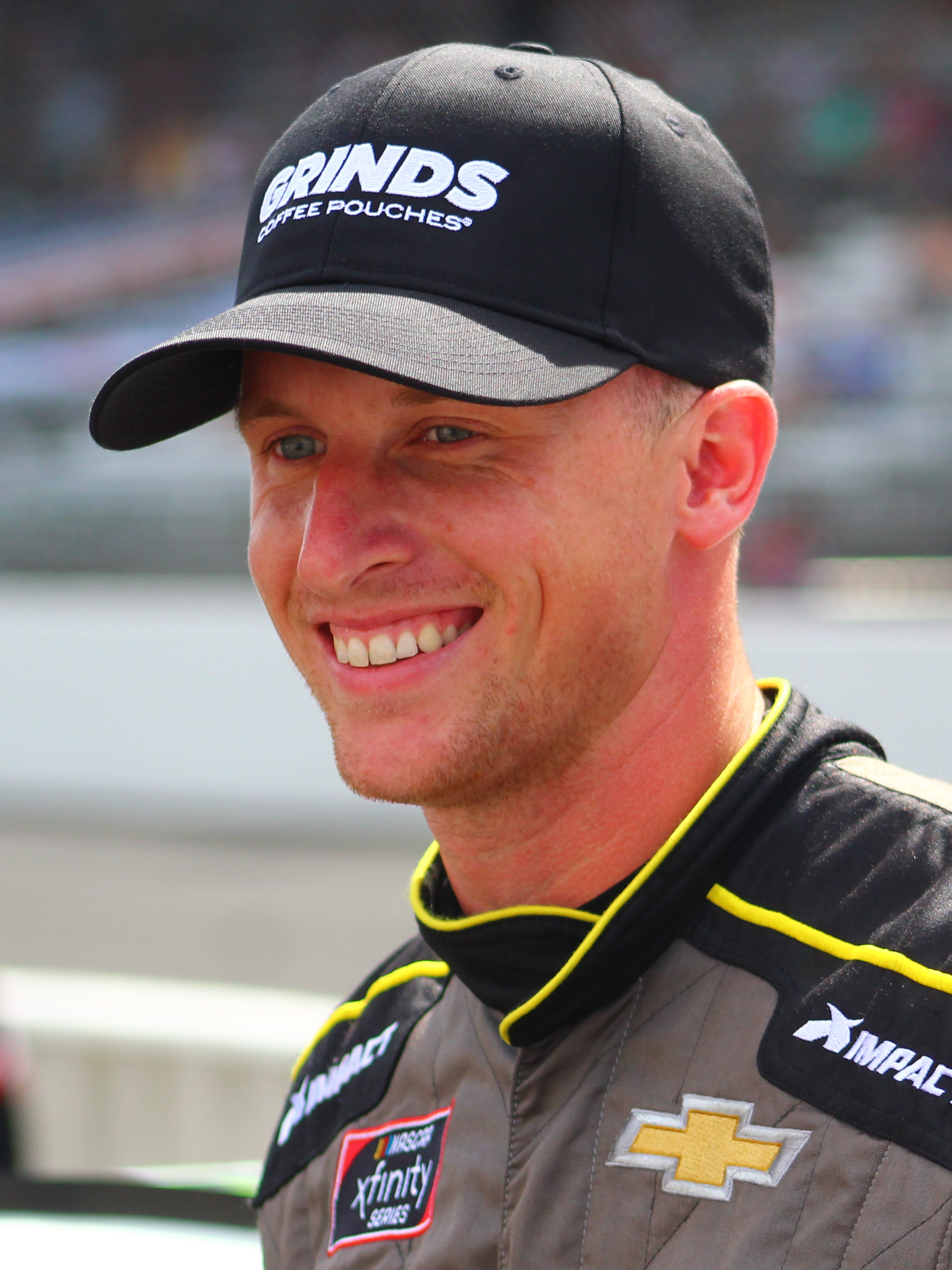
Race car driver Brandon Brown in October 2021

On October 2, 2021, racing driver Brandon Brown was being interviewed by NBC Sports reporter Kelli Stavast at the Talladega Superspeedway in Lincoln, Alabama, following his NASCAR Xfinity Series victory in the 2021 Sparks 300, which was shortened due to darkness. Fans were chanting "Fuck Joe Biden", and this became audible to viewers of the broadcast.

On the live broadcast, while wearing a headset, reporter Stavast stated, "You can hear the chants from the crowd, 'Let's go, Brandon!'". The race was Stavast's last race with NBC Sports, which did not retain her for later broadcasts and quietly removed her from their staff directory afterward.

As of December 2023, Stavast has not clarified if she misunderstood the chant or intentionally misquoted it. A reporter with the Associated Press said that the chant was "at first difficult to make out".

=== Early spread and reactions ===
Footage of the interview went viral, leading to the adoption of the phrase by critics of President Biden as an expression of antipathy toward him. It has also been reported as a protest against perceived liberal bias in mainstream media, based on speculation that the reporter's description of the crowd's chant was intended to conceal anti-Biden sentiment.

Conservative commentators Ben Shapiro and Tomi Lahren spread the phrase via Twitter. The slogan has been printed on clothing, a billboard, and a banner flown behind a plane over a pro-Donald Trump rally in Iowa.

As the phrase began to increase in use, Brandon Brown found the phrase amusing and tweeted: "To all the other Brandons out there, You're welcome! Let's go us". In private, he was ambivalent about the phrase because it overshadowed his Talladega win and threatened to scare off corporate sponsors leery of controversy. He planned to ignore the phrase, but later worried that his silence was perceived as a tacit endorsement of the sentiment. In October 2021, Brown's Brandonbilt Motorsports team was struggling to acquire sponsorship, as companies were hesitant to support him due to his indirect association with the chant and its political undertones. In December 2021, Brown, who is a Republican, said he had remained quiet during its proliferation because he had "zero desire to be involved in politics," before expressing his wish for it to be used in a positive context instead. Brown took a more mixed stance in an op-ed for Newsweek, in which he said he was "not going to endorse anyone" or be silent about issues important to him.

On November 5, 2021, NASCAR president Steve Phelps denounced any implied association with the slogan, saying that the organization does not want to be associated with politics on either the left or the right.

== Usage ==
=== Analysis ===
Linguist John McWhorter analyzed the linguistic attributes of the chant in The Atlantic, likening the use of "Brandon" to a hlonipha – a substitution of a forbidden word. He wrote that the anti-Biden euphemism has a similar tone to the word SNAFU, which stands for "Situation Normal – All Fucked Up", or to the word "cuckservatives" (a portmanteau of "cuckold" and "conservatives") which is used by some nationalists or paleoconservatives to describe neoconservatives perceived as being in fact liberals. McWhorter described the Let's Go Brandon phenomenon as "simply fascinating", and a "wild, woolly kink in the intersection of language, politics, wit, and creativity."

On November 20, 2021, the editorial board of the Pittsburgh Post-Gazette said that the chant "reveals a moral bankruptcy of those who chant it even in church". In a November 23, 2021, opinion piece for The Washington Post, Marc Thiessen, a former chief speechwriter for President George W. Bush, commented that the chant was tame compared to what has been said about other presidents. Initially, Thiessen was not a fan of the chant, but concluded his comments with, "it is a perfectly harmless and humorous way for Americans to express their frustration at a flailing – and failing – presidency."

=== Politics ===
Congressman Bill Posey's October 21, 2021, speech on the floor of the House of Representatives, which he concludes with "Let's go Brandon"

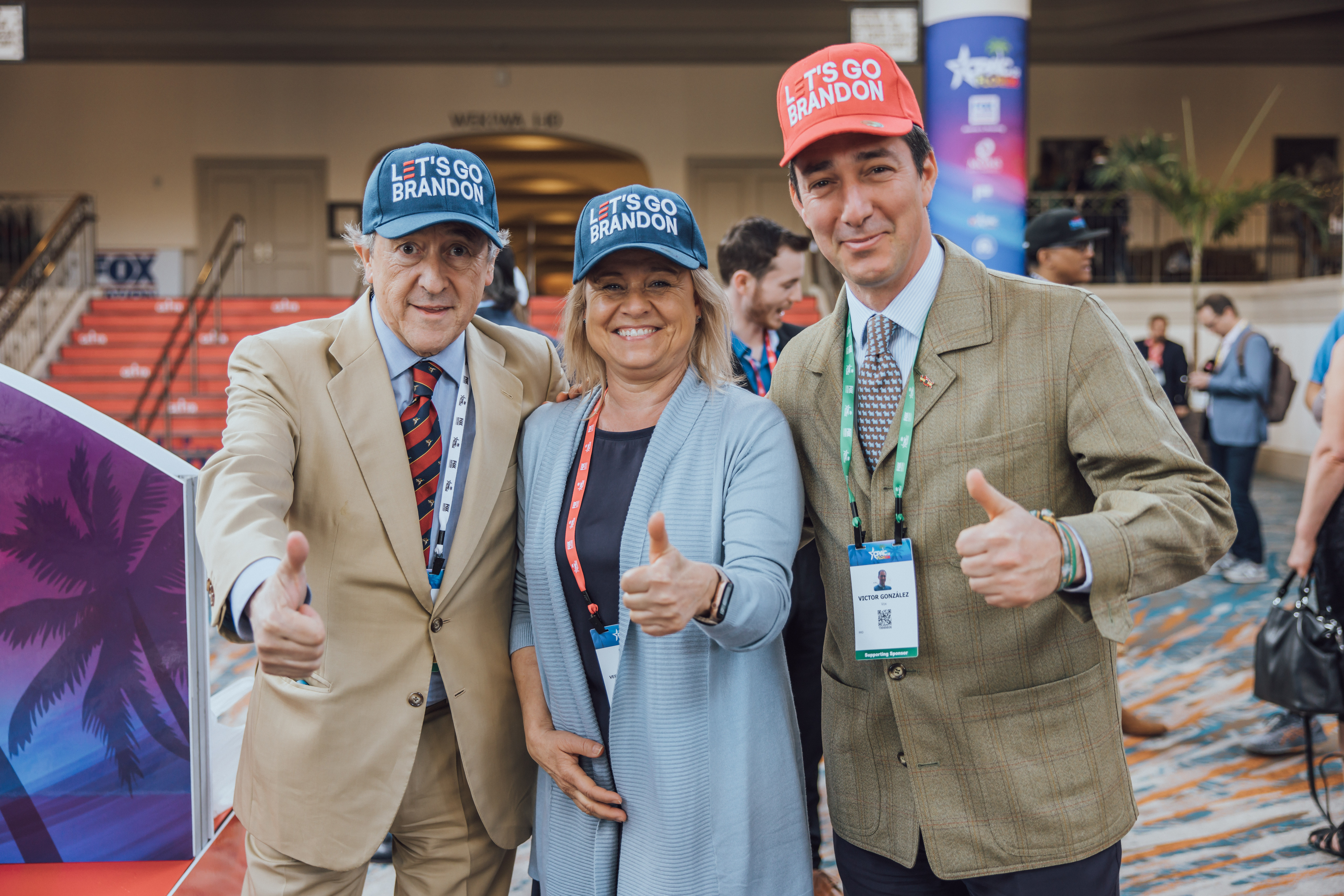
Attendees at the 2022 Conservative Political Action Conference wearing "Let's Go Brandon" hats in which the font on the cap is designed to imitate the font used in Joe Biden's 2020 campaign logo

Republican politicians have used the phrase publicly. On October 21, 2021, Republican congressman Bill Posey concluded remarks on the House floor with "Let's go, Brandon". Texas governor Greg Abbott used the phrase in an October 22 tweet. He attributed the popularity of the phrase to frustration with Biden's "disastrous policies", including his handling of the COVID-19 pandemic and the southern border. The following week, Republican representative Jeff Duncan wore a face mask with the phrase printed on it on the House floor. Senator Ted Cruz posed with a "Let's Go Brandon" sign that was hung in Houston at the 2021 World Series. Later in 2021, a rapidly increasing number of national Republican politicians explicitly supported or referred to the phrase.

On November 12, 2021, when asked about Biden's views regarding the phrase, White House press secretary Jen Psaki responded, "I don't think he spends much time focused on it or thinking about it."

While Biden and First Lady Jill Biden were taking phone calls for NORAD's Santa tracker hotline on December 24, 2021, a caller ended his chat by saying, "Merry Christmas and let's go Brandon," to which Biden smiled and responded, "Let's go Brandon, I agree."

At the 2022 White House Correspondents' Dinner, Biden acknowledged the phrase by joking, "Republicans seem to support one fella, some guy named Brandon. He's having a good year, I'm kind of happy for him."

In April 2022, Colorado state representative Dave Williams ran for the House of Representatives and attempted to be listed on the ballot under the name "Dave 'Let's Go Brandon' Williams". Colorado secretary of state Jena Griswold denied Williams' request under the reasoning that "Let's go Brandon" is a slogan and not a nickname. Williams sued, with former Colorado secretary of state Scott Gessler acting as his attorney. Although Denver district judge Andrew McCallin agreed with Williams that he had successfully proved that he used "Let's go Brandon" as his nickname, the judge ultimately ruled that Secretary of State Griswold acted within her authority in denying Williams the use of the nickname on the ballot. Williams attempted to appeal the verdict to the Colorado Supreme Court, but the court refused to hear his appeal.

The phrase has been used on bumper stickers supporting Brandon Presley, a Democratic candidate for Governor of Mississippi in 2023.

Republican candidate Brandon Herrera used the phrase as a campaign slogan for his 2026 congressional campaign.

=== Music ===
Soon after the chant went viral, an anti-Biden rap song called "Let's Go Brandon" was recorded by Loza Alexander. The song first went viral on TikTok before rising to number one on the iTunes Store Top Hip-Hop/Rap Songs list, and number two on the platform's Top Songs list, on October 18, 2021. Alexander's song reached number 38 on the Billboard Hot 100 for the week of November 6, 2021.

Another song with the same title was released by Bryson Gray, a conservative Christian rapper, reaching number one on iTunes. It debuted at number 28 on the US Hot 100. The music video for Gray's song, which included the line "Biden said the jab stop the spread, it was lies" (in reference to COVID-19 vaccination efforts by Biden) was taken down by YouTube for containing "medical misinformation". A country rap song of the same name was recorded by Forgiato Blow. On October 27, iTunes had different "Let's Go Brandon" recordings at numbers one, two, four and eight.

On January 25, 2022, Kid Rock released a single, "We the People", in which he attacks the media, Dr. Anthony Fauci, masks, COVID-19 restrictions, and Big Tech, and which features the chant "Let's go Brandon" in the chorus.

=== Brandon Brown sponsorship ===
In early November, a right-wing ERC20 token called "LGBcoin" (LGB) began trading, and on December 30, 2021, LGBcoin announced that it would be sponsoring Brandon Brown's Brandonbilt Motorsports for the 2022 NASCAR Xfinity Series season. Brandonbilt's spokesman told Fox Business that approval was received on December 26, but on January 5, 2022, FOX Sports journalist Bob Pockrass reported that NASCAR had not approved the sponsorship. In response, investor James Koutoulas threatened a lawsuit against NASCAR, and called for a boycott until the decision was reversed.

In February 2022, the U.S. 11th Circuit Court of Appeals ruled in a lawsuit against Bitconnect that the Securities Act of 1933 extends to targeted solicitation using social media. In April 2022, a class-action lawsuit was filed in Florida by plaintiff Eric De Ford against the LGBcoin cryptocurrency company and its promoters Brandon Brown, NASCAR, and political commentator Candace Owens. The plaintiff alleges they made false or misleading statements about LGBcoin being a pump and dump scheme.

Another suit was filed by Koutoulas and the Let'sGoBrandon.com Foundation against NASCAR in September 2025, seeking $76 million in damages for the sponsorship being rejected. A jury in Miami-Dade County, Florida, ruled in NASCAR's favor on October 6.

=== Other ===
In 2022, a nine-year-old autistic boy named Brandon Brundidge saw a sign with the phrase; not knowing the political meaning, he assumed they were supporting him. It inspired him to try swimming and biking without training wheels. His mother, Sheletta Brundidge, wrote a book called Brandon Spots His Sign, and they later met Brandon Brown.

== Dark Brandon ==
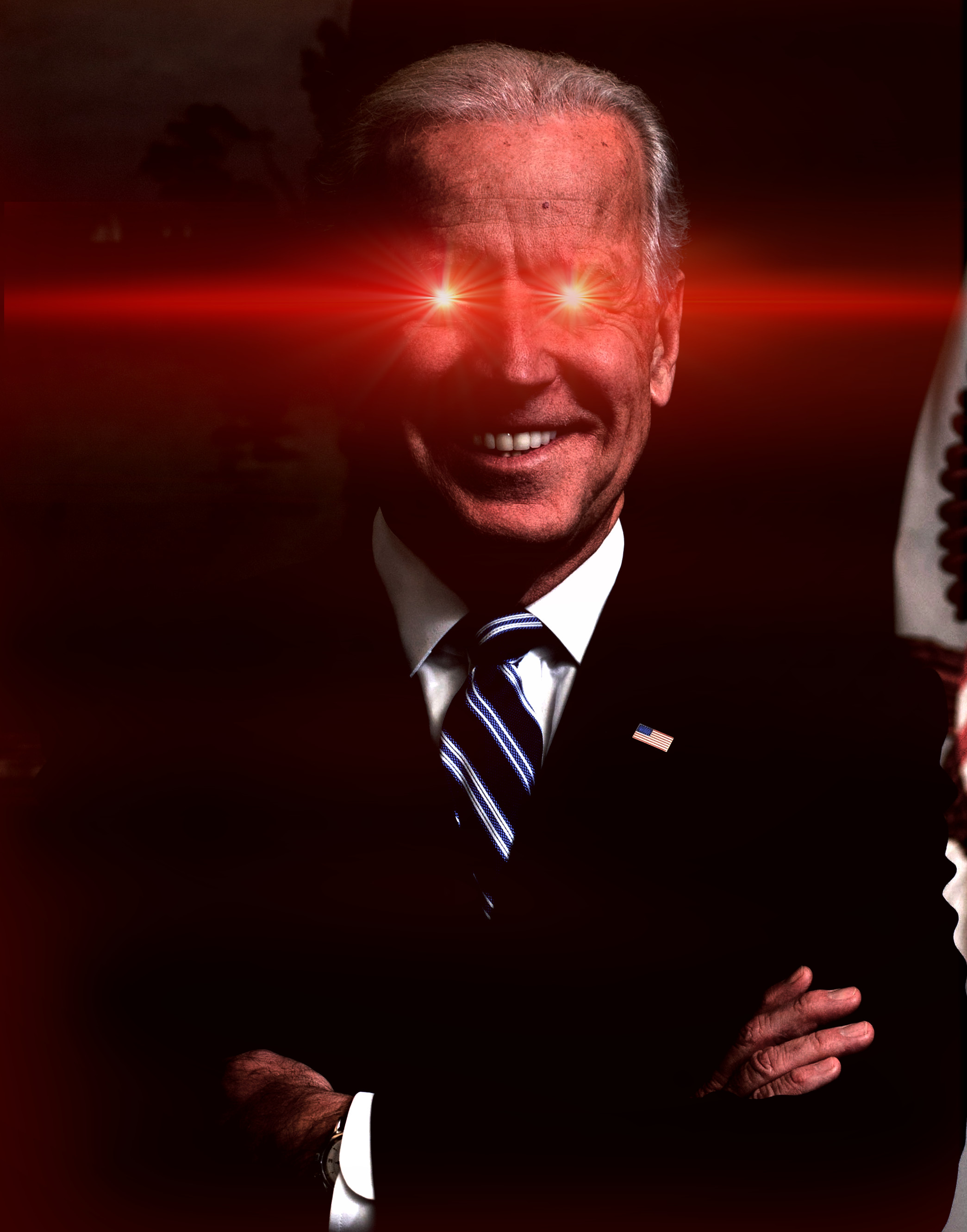
"Dark Brandon" imagery

The phrase "Dark Brandon" was initially a meme created by online progressives to parody supporters of "Dark MAGA", a prediction promoted by former U.S. representative Madison Cawthorn that former president Trump would return to power "with a vengeance". It copies the "fashwave" aesthetic used initially by online supporters of figures like Donald Trump or Ron DeSantis.

In September 2022, the phrase was used to mock Biden and compare him to Adolf Hitler, during his Battle for the Soul of the Nation speech on Trump and his supporters. During the speech, TV cameras framed Biden in front of a background illuminated by red lighting, along with two uniformed Marines on either side, with The Guardian calling it "dark", and New York Magazine saying the speech prompted "numerous comparisons of Biden to Hitler and Satan".

The term was soon comically adopted by Biden's supporters and used in memes to support Biden's presidency.

=== Official reactions ===
Several White House officials, members of the Biden team, and U.S. senator Chris Murphy made posts referencing "Dark Brandon" on social media. Biden's 2024 re-election campaign also embraced the persona, making use of "Dark Brandon" imagery on their website's error message page and selling merchandise which references the meme. According to the campaign, such products accounted for more than half of online purchase revenue on Biden's official website store.

During the 2023 White House Correspondents Dinner, Biden himself acknowledged the meme, donning aviator sunglasses and joking to the next speaker, "I'm going to be fine with your jokes, but I'm not sure about Dark Brandon." The term is often used when Biden "goes on the offensive". An Agence France-Presse journalist wrote that the variant rebranded "him from ineffectual grandfather figure to a kind of political terminator". On August 3, Biden posted a reel on Instagram where he drank coffee from a mug with "Dark Brandon" imagery. The video went viral with over 9 million views and half a million likes. In February 2024, Biden used the persona in social media posts poking fun at a right-wing conspiracy theory alleging that Super Bowl LVIII was rigged in favor of the Kansas City Chiefs to boost Biden's reelection campaign, with the help of singer-songwriter Taylor Swift and her boyfriend, Chiefs tight end Travis Kelce.

Reception of the meme has been mixed, with some arguing that official acknowledgement by the Biden administration "killed" the meme.

== Gallery ==
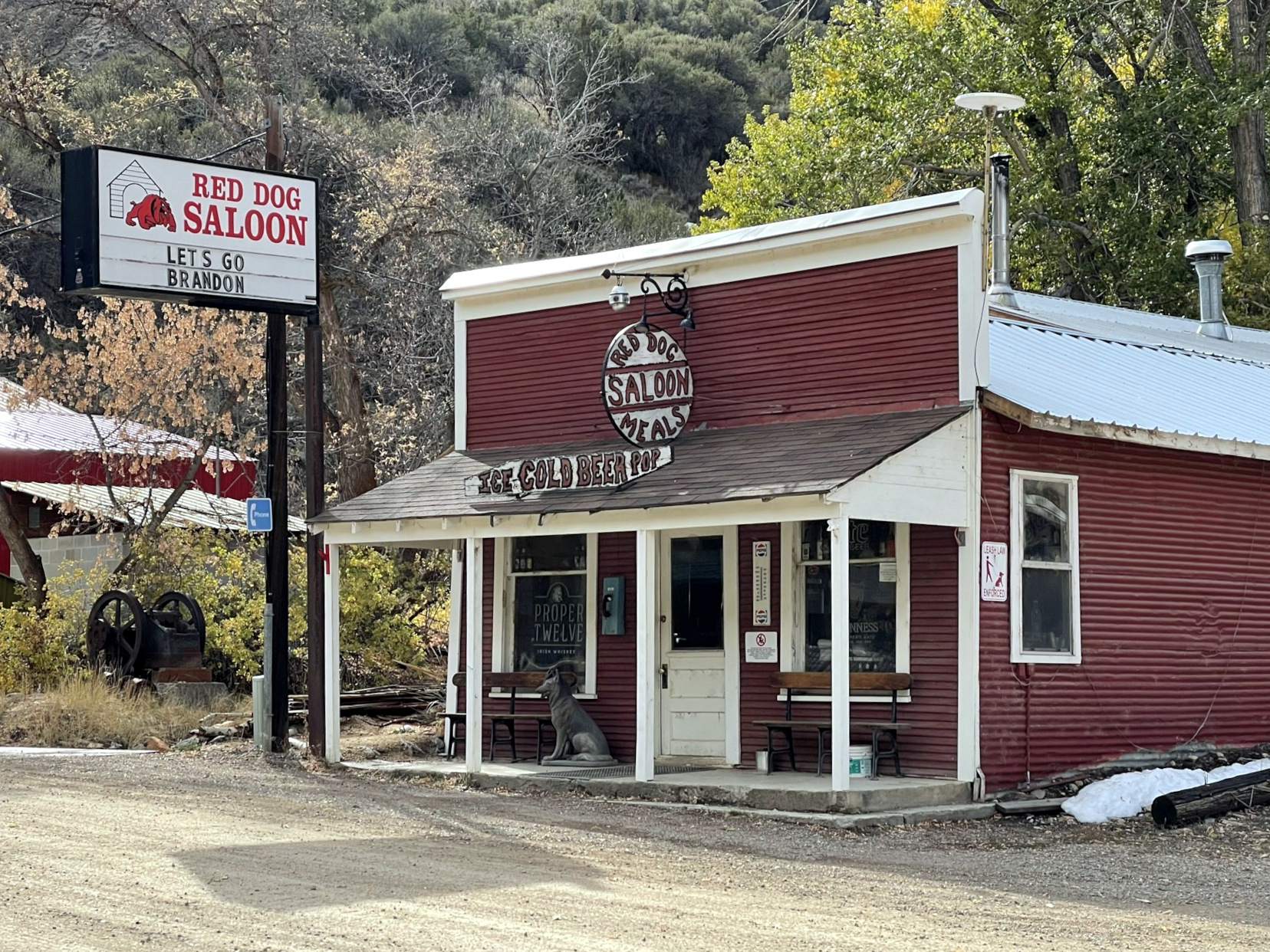
The slogan posted on a sign at a bar in Jarbidge, Nevada

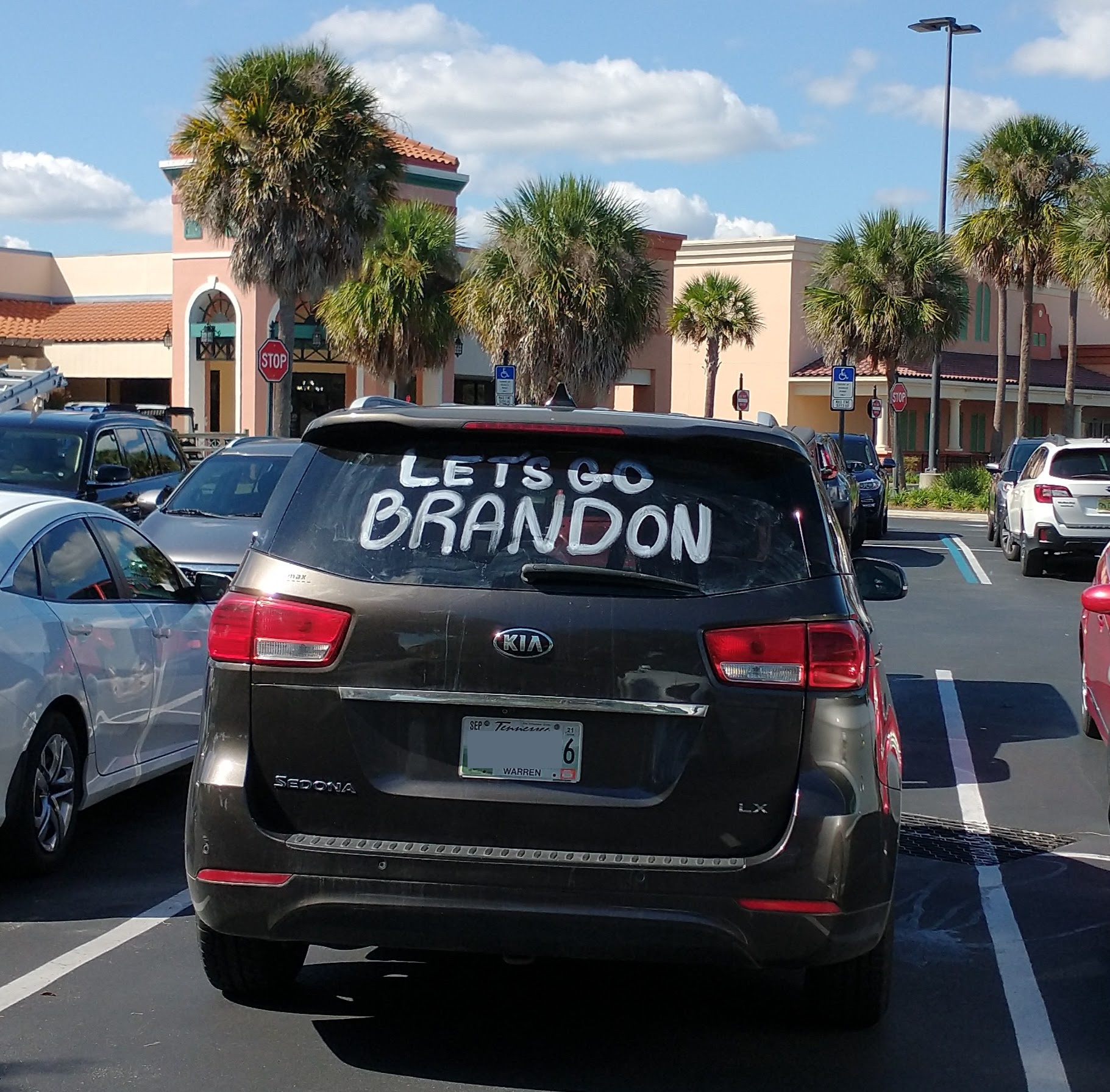
An automobile with the slogan written on the rear glass, parked in The Villages, Florida

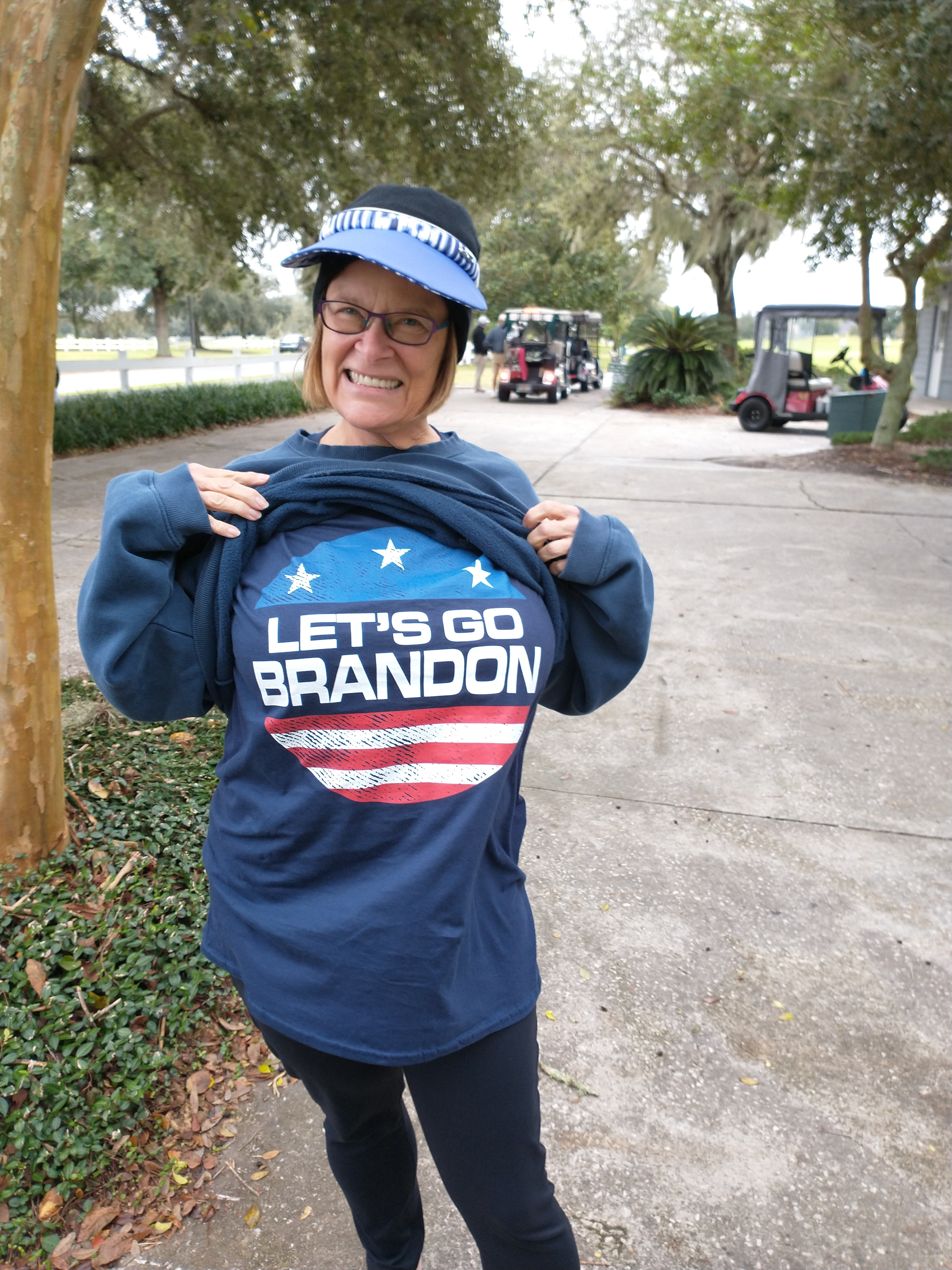
A woman wearing a shirt with the slogan

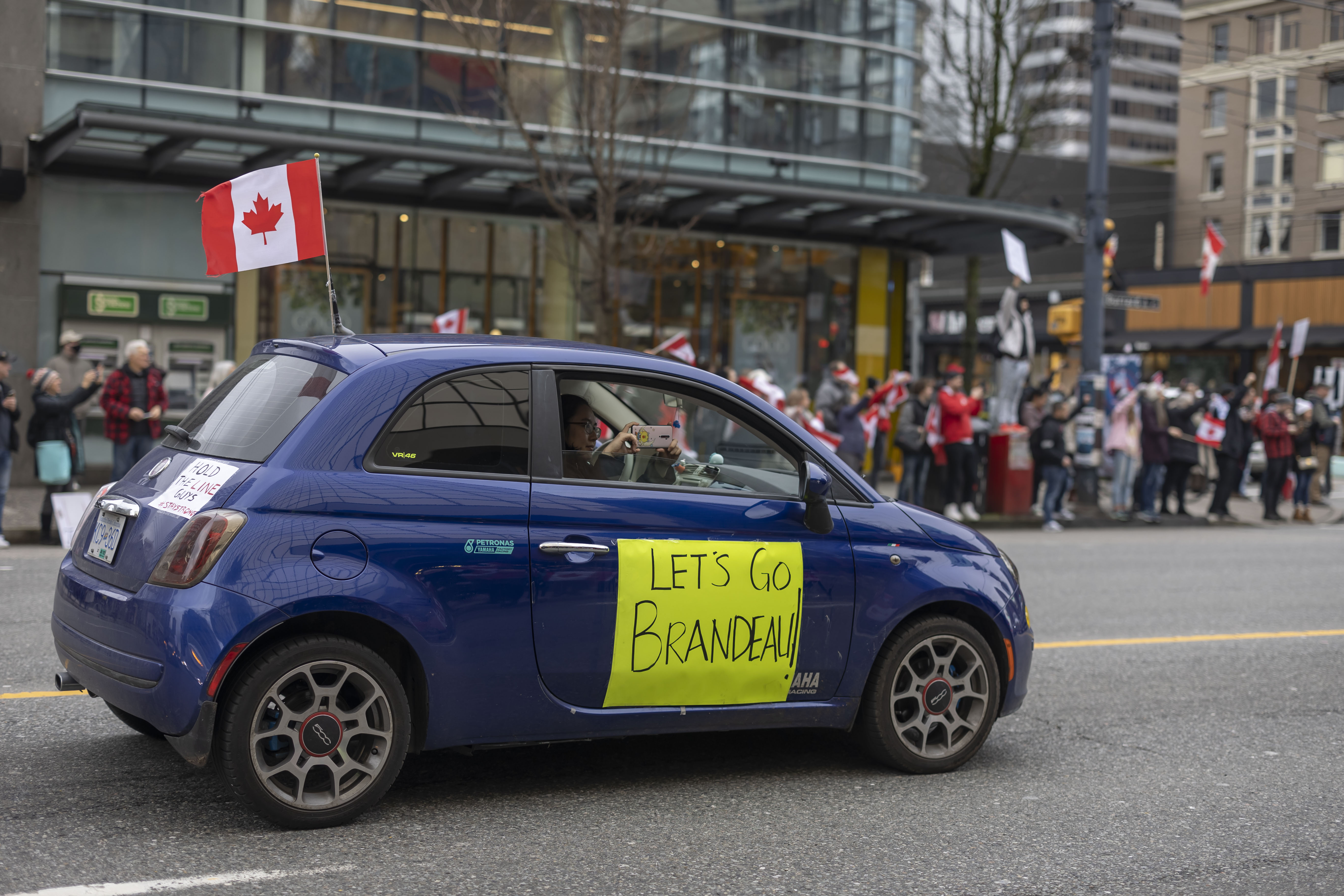
A Canadian adaptation of the slogan with the name Brandon slightly changed to end with a suffix "eau", designed to rhyme with the name of Canadian prime minister Justin Trudeau

== See also ==
- O1G, a similar slogan used in opposition to Hungarian prime minister Viktor Orbán
- "FDT", a protest song by American rappers YG and Nipsey Hussle, whose title is an initialism for "Fuck Donald Trump"
- It's Joever, an Internet meme relating to Joe Biden
- Thanks, Obama, a slogan which gained popular use through viral memes criticizing the presidency of Barack Obama
- "Maggie Out": an anti-Margaret Thatcher chant used during Thatcher's time as Prime Minister of the United Kingdom
- Mondegreen
- Minced oath
- "Putin khuylo!", a slogan used in opposition to Russian president Vladimir Putin, which became popular in Ukraine after the annexation of Crimea
- "Trump Always Chickens Out" (TACO): an acronym used to describe the tariff policies of Donald Trump
