= Tell Me When to Go =

Single by E-40 featuring Keak da Sneak

from the album My Ghetto Report Card
- Released: February 1, 2006
- Recorded: 2005
- Genre: Crunk; hyphy; West Coast hip-hop
- Length: 3:57
- Label: BME, Sick Wid It, Warner Bros.
- Songwriters: Earl Stevens, Joseph Simmons, Darryl McDaniels
- Producer: Lil Jon

E-40 singles chronology
"Quarterbackin'" (2006)	"Tell Me When to Go" (2006)	"Snap Yo Fingers" (2006)

Keak da Sneak singles chronology
"Tell Me When to Go" (2006)	"Fast (Like a Nascar)" (2007)

Music video
- "Tell Me When to Go" on YouTube

Audio sample
- file; help

"Tell Me When to Go" is the first single from E-40's BME/Warner Bros. debut, My Ghetto Report Card. Keak da Sneak is also featured on the track. It was produced by Lil Jon, and one of the first singles to kick off the hyphy movement on a national level and popularized the phrase "ghost ride the whip". The song reached number 35 in the U.S. and eventually was certified Platinum by the RIAA on February 2, 2024. The song first premiered online on the Myspace.com homepage and it was the first hip-hop single to premiere online before being released.

The song samples "Dumb Girl" by Run-DMC.

The song is featured in the 2007 Xbox 360/PlayStation 3 video game Def Jam: Icon. E-40 is a playable character in the video game and provides his own voice and likeness. It also appeared in "The Fugitive", a season 4 episode of the scripted comedy series Brooklyn Nine-Nine.

== Music video ==
The black and white music video, produced by production company Immigrant Films, was directed and edited by Bernard Gourley and lensed by cinematographer David Claessen. Filmed at the abandoned 16th Street station in West Oakland, it features cameo appearances from D-Shot, B-Legit, Dem Hoodstarz, Haji Springer, Too Short, Lil Jon, Rick Rock, The Federation, Battle Loco, Lil Scrappy, J. Valentine, Mistah F.A.B., Big Rich, Turf Talk, The Crest Creepaz, Frank D. and the Architeckz turf dancing crew with choreography by Jeriel Bey. This video peaked number 72 on BET's Notarized: The Top 100 Videos of 2006.

In 2016, director Dante Ariola and cinematographer Chris Soos recreated the music video for a Beats Studio Wireless headphones commercial, also titled – and set to – "Tell Me When to Go", starring Golden State Warriors' power forward Draymond Green and featuring E-40 and cameos by Green's then-Warriors teammates Ian Clark, Brandon Rush, and Shaun Livingston as well as Oakland natives Gary Payton and Brian Shaw. The 90-second version also features Keak da Sneak. The spot is one of three that earned Ariola a DGA best commercial director nomination in 2017.

== Live performances ==
"Tell Me When to Go" was performed live, the day before the 2006 MTV Video Music Awards in a club in New York City. This performance featured E-40 and Lil Jon rapping, while a rock instrumental was played by Metal Skool. The event was held at Snitch, a rock-themed club.

== Charts ==
Chart (2006)	Peak position
US Billboard Hot 100	35
US Pop 100 (Billboard)	50
US Hot R&B/Hip-Hop Songs (Billboard)	37
US Hot Rap Songs (Billboard)	8

== Remixes ==
The official remix features a new verse from E-40 and features Kanye West, Ice Cube, and The Game.

The "Bay Area Remix" includes the entire hyphy roster. It features Too Short, B-Legit, Clyde Carson, Turf Talk, Richie Rich, San Quinn, The Federation, Hoodstarz, Messy Marv, Mistah F.A.B., Yukmouth, Big Rich, PSD, J-Diggs and rap group Balance. At the start of the song, E-40 proclaims "RIP Mac Dre, Dre you supposed to be on this one baby", referring to rapper Mac Dre, who is considered the originator of the hyphy movement.

Another remix was done by Chingo Bling entitled "Tell Me When to Go (Remix)" from the album They All Want Him, But Who Can Afford Him.

Another popular remix was done by producer Trackademicks entitled "Tell Me When to Go (Trackademicks Remix)", released in February 2006 on his independently released compilation, The Spring Progress Report.

== Cultural impact ==
In March 2022, a music documentary about the hyphy movement, We Were Hyphy, was released. It explored the part "Tell Me When to Go" played in the hyphy movement, as well as interviewing many of the well-known artists of the time, such as Keak da Sneak, and Rick Rock. It also featured contemporaneous musicians, including G-Eazy, Kamaiyah and P-Lo talking about the hyphy movement.

The San Francisco 49ers play "Tell Me When to Go" when they score touchdowns at Levi's Stadium.

== Certifications ==
Region	Certification	Certified units/sales
United States (RIAA)	Platinum	1,000,000^{‡}
^{‡} Sales+streaming figures based on certification alone.

== Release history ==
Region	Date	Format(s)	Label(s)	Ref.
United States	January 31, 2006	Rhythmic contemporary radio	Reprise, Warner Bros.	
