= Drew Deezy =

American rapper

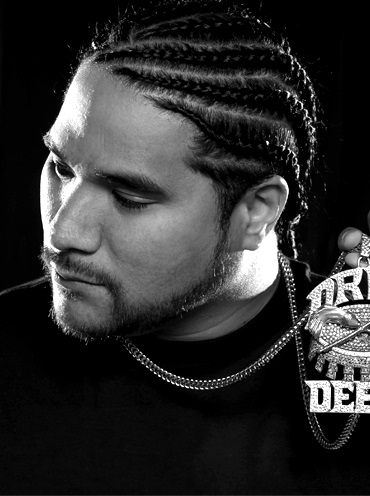

Background information
- Origin: San Jose, California, United States
- Genres: West Coast hip hop, hyphy
- Occupations: Musician, rapper
- Years active: 1999–present
- Label: 454 Life Entertainment
- Website: http://454.vn

Drew Deezy is a Samoan American rapper from San Jose, California.

== Career ==
In 2010, Drew signed with 454 Life Entertainment and was featured in the label's compilation album "As Real As It Gets". He was featured in the July 2011 issue of New Zealand magazine Rip It Up magazine.

== Discography ==
=== Albums ===
- 2004: It's Our Time
- 2010: As Real As It Gets
- 2012: The Poly Tape
- 2015: The Poly Tape 2

=== Mixtapes/Street Albums ===
- 2011: Connected

=== Singles ===
- 2010: "We Get Money" Drew Deezy, Thai Viet G, Feat. Glasses Malone & Matt Blaque. Produced by Traxamillion
- 2010: "I Don't See Nothing Wrong" Drew Deezy, Thai Ngo, Feat. Bobby V.. Produced by Traxamillion
- 2012: "Go Gettah" Feat. Spawnbreezie Produced by Bigg Seff
- 2012 "Come back to me" Feat. Fiji Produced by Bigg Seff & Uce Nation
- 2015 "50/50" Feat. Fiji & Tenelle
- 2019 “On the gang” Feat. Scrillz Produced by Bigg Seff
