= A Good Night in the Ghetto =

Mixtape by Kamaiyah
- Released: March 14, 2016
- Genre: Hip hop
- Length: 44:24
- Label: Self-released
- Producer: Drew Banga; CT Beats; DJ Official; Trackademicks; WTF Nonstop; Link Up; 1-O.A.K.; P-Lo

Kamaiyah chronology
| A Good Night in the Ghetto (2016) | Before I Wake (2017) |

A Good Night in the Ghetto is the debut mixtape by American rapper and singer Kamaiyah. It was released on March 14, 2016. The production is handled by Drew Banga, CT Beats, DJ Official, Trackademicks, WTF Nonstop, Link Up, 1-O.A.K., and P-Lo. "F*ck It Up" features a guest appearance from fellow rapper YG.

Kamaiyah stated that she "wanted to make a soundtrack for the average 18-25 year old thriving, living and having a good time". She said, "I feel like a lot of music nowadays is hella dark, and I didn't want to make a project that was dark."

Music videos were created for "Out the Bottle", "How Does It Feel", "For My Dawg", "F*ck It Up", "Mo Money Mo Problems", "I'm On", and "Freaky Freaks".

== Critical reception ==
Professional ratings
Review scores
| Source | Rating |
|---|---|
| Exclaim! | 9/10 |
| The Line of Best Fit | 9/10 |
| Pitchfork | 8.2/10 |

Ryan Lunn of The Line of Best Fit described it as "a mixtape that uses positive energy in order to bring attention to difficult subjects, like a parent giving their child a chocolate bar before taking them to get a flu jab." Jayson Greene of Pitchfork said, "The songs are simple, unfussy, and full of space, with a low-key mood meant less for a raucous house party and more for a casual basement hangout." James Wilt of Exclaim! commented that "There's not a single song worth skipping on A Good Night, although the three short interludes (all titled 'Hoochie Hotline Interlude') don't add much."

=== Accolades ===
| Publication | Accolade | Rank | Ref. |
|---|---|---|---|
| Complex | 50 Best Albums of 2016 | 21 | |
| The Guardian | 15 Best Mixtapes of 2016 | N/A | |
| Pitchfork | 50 Best Albums of 2016 | 47 | |
| Rolling Stone | 40 Best Rap Albums of 2016 | 17 | |

== Track listing ==
| No. | Title | Producer(s) | Length |
|---|---|---|---|
| 1. | "I'm On" | Drew Banga | 3:29 |
| 2. | "Out the Bottle" (featuring Zay) | CT Beats | 3:16 |
| 3. | "Hoochie Hotline" | | 0:47 |
| 4. | "N*ggas" | CT Beats | 4:18 |
| 5. | "F*ck It Up" (featuring YG) | DJ Official | 2:22 |
| 6. | "Break You Down" | CT Beats | 4:39 |
| 7. | "Hoochie Hotline 2" | | 0:38 |
| 8. | "Come Back" | Trackademicks | 4:00 |
| 9. | "How Does It Feel" | CT Beats | 2:37 |
| 10. | "Mo Money Mo Problems" | WTF Nonstop | 3:07 |
| 11. | "Hoochie Hotline 3" | | 0:39 |
| 12. | "Ain't Going Home Tonight" | Link Up | 2:37 |
| 13. | "Swing My Way" | 1-O.A.K. | 2:44 |
| 14. | "Freaky Freaks" | Trackademicks | 2:36 |
| 15. | "One Love" | P-Lo | 3:12 |
| 16. | "For My Dawg" | CT Beats | 3:30 |
| Total length: | | | 44:24 |
