= Why You Always Hatin? =

Single by YG featuring Drake and Kamaiyah

from the album Still Brazy
- Released: May 21, 2016
- Recorded: 2015
- Studio: 17 Hertz Studio
- Genre: West Coast hip hop
- Length: 3:18
- Label: 400; CTE; Def Jam
- Songwriters: Keenon Jackson; Kamaiyah Johnson; Aubrey Graham; August Moon; Tyrone Thomas; Clarence Eugene Thomas
- Producer: CT Beats

YG singles chronology
"FDT (Fuck Donald Trump)" (2016)	"Why You Always Hatin?" (2016)	"One Time Comin" (2016)

Drake singles chronology
"Pop Style" (2016)	"Why You Always Hatin?" (2016)	"For Free" (2016)

Kamaiyah singles chronology
"How Does It Feel" (2015)	"Why You Always Hatin?" (2016)	"Break You Down" (2016)

Music video
- "Why You Always Hatin?" on YouTube

"Why You Always Hatin?" is a song by American rapper YG featuring Canadian rapper Drake and fellow American rapper Kamaiyah. It was released as the third single from YG's second studio album Still Brazy on May 21, 2016. YG previously worked with Drake on "Who Do You Love".

== Music video ==
The song's accompanying music video premiered on August 15, 2016 on YG's Vevo YouTube account.

== Charts ==
=== Weekly charts ===
Chart (2016)	Peak position
Canada Hot 100 (Billboard)	72
US Billboard Hot 100	62
US Hot R&B/Hip-Hop Songs (Billboard)	18
US Rhythmic Airplay (Billboard)	15

=== Year-end charts ===
Chart (2016)	Position
US Hot R&B/Hip-Hop Songs (Billboard)	70

== Certifications ==
Region	Certification	Certified units/sales
United States (RIAA)	2× Platinum	2,000,000^{‡}
^{‡} Sales+streaming figures based on certification alone.
