= We Were Hyphy =

2022 music documentary film

- Directed by: Laurence Madrigal
- Story by: Laurence Madrigal, Ryan McDowell, Jason O’Mahony
- Produced by: Jason O’Mahony
- Starring: Mistah FAB, Kamaiyah, Keak da Sneak, P-Lo, Rafael Casal
- Narrated by: Benjamin Earl Turner
- Edited by: Laurence Madrigal
- Production company: Castle G Productions
- Release date: April 1, 2022
- Running time: 85 minutes
- Country: United States
- Language: English

We Were Hyphy is a 2022 documentary film about Hyphy, a sub-genre of hip-hop.

The term hyphy (/ˈhaɪfiː/ HY-fee) is Oakland slang meaning "hyperactive". More specifically, it is an adjective describing hip hop and the culture associated with the area. The term was coined by Oakland rapper Keak da Sneak.

== Synopsis ==
This music documentary traces Hyphy's genesis on Bay Area streets and examines its influence with interviews from well-known Hyphy figures including Keak da Sneak and Mistah FAB to modern-day artists such as Kamaiyah, Rafael Casal, P-Lo, and G-Eazy who grew up during the Hyphy movement and were deeply influenced by it.

The film takes viewers on a journey through Hyphy culture and sound, "showcasing a movement that uniquely captured a special time and place in modern history."

Through interviews with Bay Area artists including G-Eazy and Kamaiyah, journalists, and industry professionals, We Were Hyphy provides an intimate glimpse into Hyphy culture from two perspectives – through the eyes of the artists who created the iconic sound, and through Bay Area residents who grew up under the influence of hyphy's "uniquely charismatic spell".

The documentary opens on scenes of West Oakland, and shows a mural of Mac Dre and slow motion footage of a black muscle car doing a doughnut (driving). "‘Hyphy is a lot of different things. But at its core, it’s music,’ the film's narrator Benjamin Earl Turner explains."

The regional subgenre, which the film succinctly describes as a sped-up and more eccentric version of Mobb Music, itself an earlier, grittier genre of Bay Area hip-hop, culminated in a number of high-profile releases: Super Sic Wit It by Mistah FAB, Super Hyphy by Keak Da Sneak, Feelin’ Myself by Mac Dre and, of course, Tell Me When To Go, by E-40.

The film also tells the darker side of the hyphy movement's history, namely the impact that the untimely death of Mac Dre in 2004 had on the movement.

The documentary reflects how hyphy is "an energy, a feeling" and something "that you feel inside," sampling from some of the genre's top hits and using archived footage to create a vivid experience that transports viewers to a different time and place.

== Cast ==
The film features a number of the original Hyphy artists and additionally speaks to newer artists who were inspired by the Hyphy music of their youth. Featured Hyphy artists include Keak da Sneak, and Mistah FAB. Contemporary (as of 2022) artists include Kamaiyah, Rafael Casal, P-Lo, and G-Eazy.

== Reception ==
The movie was well received, in general, with Zoe Zorka, in The Source saying it "takes viewers on a journey through the unique Hyphy culture and sound, showcasing a movement that uniquely captured a special time and place in modern history."

Bryson "Boom" Paul, also in The Source noted that the film is a "beautifully shot, heartbreakingly sweet story" that it is "a love song to all those who were brought together by the sounds of the Hyphy era.

However, Nastia Voynovskaya in KQED noted the limitations of the documentary to fully explore the complexity of Hyphy saying, "We Were Hyphy is just one hyphy history, not the hyphy history. Could a completely thorough, definitive documentary about such an explosive, chaotic movement even exist? We Were Hyphy is a good starting point of a conversation on screen."
