= Traxamillion =

American hip hop producer (1979–2022)

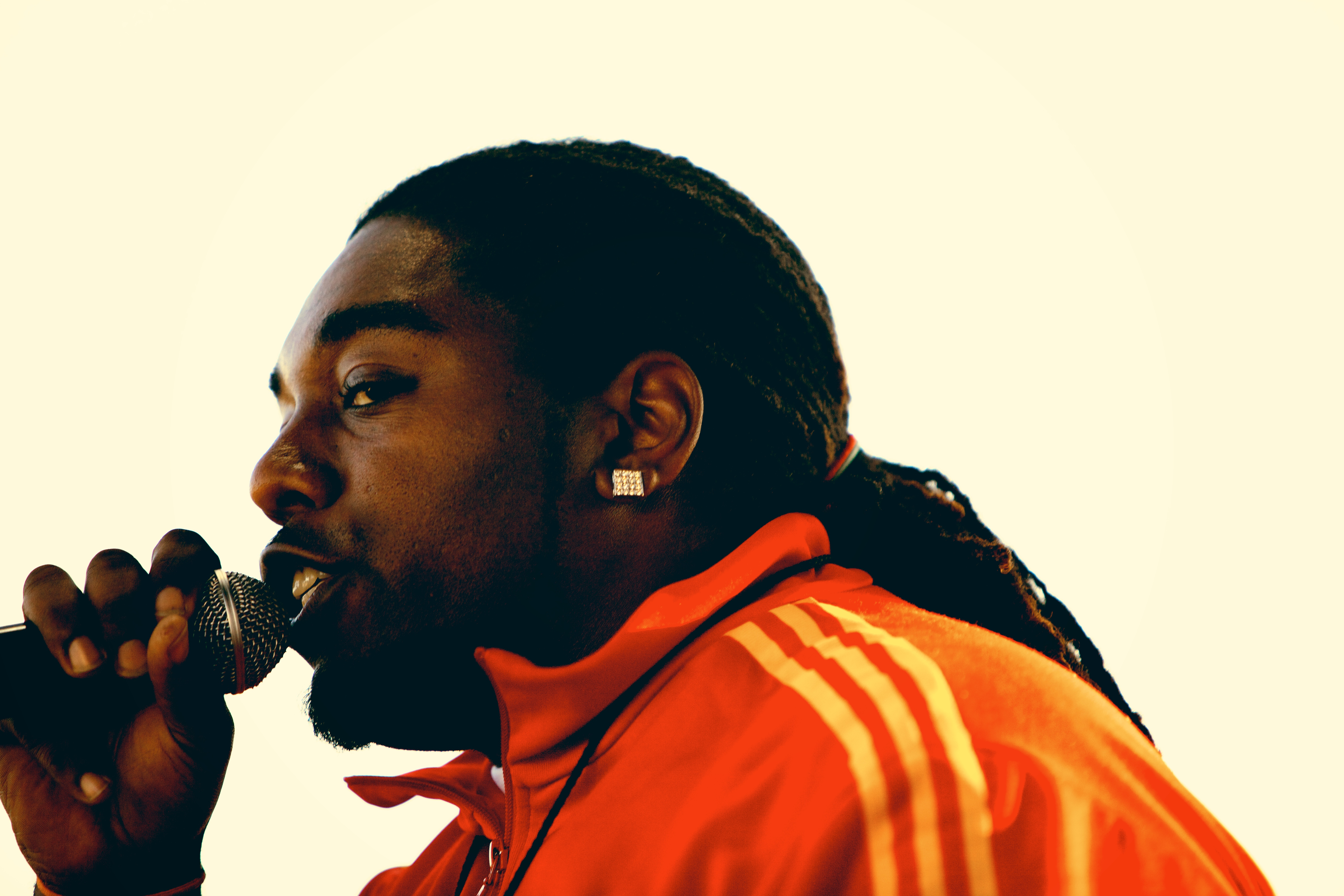
- Traxamillion at Hot Import Nights in 2009

Background information
- Also known as: The Slapp Addict
- Born: Sultan Banks; February 26, 1979; San Jose, California, U.S.
- Died: January 2, 2022 (aged 42) San Jose, California, U.S.
- Genres: West Coast hip hop, Hyphy
- Occupations: Record producer, rapper
- Labels: 54 Life, Slapp Addict, Official
- Website: traxamillion.com

Sultan Banks (February 26, 1979 – January 2, 2022), better known as Traxamillion, was an American hip hop producer. He produced records such as Keak da Sneak's "Super Hyphy" and Dem Hoodstarz "Grown Man Remix". His first album, The Slapp Addict, was a compilation of Bay Area hyphy artists and was released August 22, 2006.

== Early life ==
Banks grew up in San Jose, California. While attending Markham Middle School in the early 1990s, Banks visited KSCU, the student radio station at Santa Clara University, and sometimes performed freestyle raps live on the station.

== Music career ==
Early in his music career, Banks rapped with a backpack rap style with lyrics similar to Bay Area group Hieroglyphics. However, he decided that he would be more successful making music targeted to nightclubs, so he bought a Casio keyboard to compose beats in that style.

Traxamillion's productions, including "Super Hyphy" by Keak da Sneak and "Grown Man" by Dem Hoodstarz, were often played on KMEL and other local radio stations around 2005.

Traxamillion also released a mixtape called The Slapp Addict Mixtape, which features mainstream artists as well as local Bay Area artists, and was responsible for producing the remix of "About Us" by Brooke Hogan featuring E-40. In addition to being a producer, Traxamillion also rapped, which he demonstrated on tracks such as "Bring It Back" and "Skrape" on The Slapp Addict. His song "The Movement" is featured on College Hoops 2K7.

In 2010, Traxamillion signed with 454 Life Entertainment after producing the label's second single "We Get Money" by Drew Deezy and Thai VG featuring Glasses Malone. He went on to produce a majority of the label's compilation album "As Real As It Gets".

In 2017, Traxamillion was diagnosed with "a rare form of cancer". On January 2, 2022, he died from the disease, aged 42, while under hospice care at his aunt's home in San Jose. He was remembered as "an influential Bay Area hip-hop producer" and "a key architect of one of its most notable musical movements: hyphy."

== Discography ==
=== Albums ===
- 2006: The Slapp Addict
- 2012: My Radio
- 2016: The Tech Boom
- 2020: For The City (with City Shawn)
- 2021: Sirens

=== Mixtapes ===
- 2007: Ridin' High
- 2012: Traxamillion Did It

=== EPs ===
- 2016: The Trapp Addict
- 2018: Traxamillion Presents: It Was a Hot Summer (with Ziggy)

=== Singles ===
- 2005: "Super Hyphy" (feat. Keak Da Sneak)
- 2006: "From The Hood" (feat. The Jacka, Husalah and San Quinn)
- 2006: "Sideshow" (feat. Mistah F.A.B. and Too Short)
- 2006: "Club Stuntin" (feat. The Pack)
- 2006: "Gas, Skrape" (feat. Izz Thizz)
- 2006: "On Citas" (feat. Keak Da Sneak)
- 2006: "Cruisin Down The Avenue" (feat. Soz). Produced by Traxamillion
- 2006: "Yellow Bus" (feat. Mistah F.A.B.)
- 2006: "About Us (remix)" (feat. Brooke Hogan and Paul Wall)
- 2007: "Radar" (feat. Izz Thizz)
- 2007: "San Francisco Anthem" (feat. San Quinn, Big Rich, and Boo Banga)
- 2007: "White Kids Aren't Hyphy" (MC Lars)
- 2009: "808"
- 2010: "We Get Money" Drew Deezy, Thai, Feat. Glasses Malone & Matt Blaque. Produced by Traxamillion
- 2010: "I Don't See Nothing Wrong" Drew Deezy, Thai, Feat. Bobby V.. Produced by Traxamillion
- 2012: "Boy" (feat. Clyde Carson and Ya Boy) Produced by Traxamillion
- 2012: "Boy(Russian Remix)" (feat. Clyde Carson, SIFO, Seva Rizhsky, HarmLess, Dan_D) Produced by Traxamillion
- 2013: "Real One"
- 2016: "Mood RN" (feat. Flammy Marciano)
- 2020: "I Don't Wanna Dance" (feat. City Shawn and Too $hort)
- 2021: "Handstand" (feat. Shanti and Krissy Blanko)
- 2021: "Been Awhile" (feat. Mickey Shiloh)
- 2021: "Madness" (feat. Chenelle McCoy)

=== Guest appearances ===
- 2007: "Somebody Like You" (Chantelle Paige feat. Traxamillion) (he co-wrote and produced the track as well).
- 2008: "Lil Mama" (Roderick feat. Traxamillion) (he only produced the track)
- 2014: "Rich Boy" (J Shabs Ft. Milla, MultiMilanaire, Traxamillion) (He co-produced the beat alongside MultiMilanaire)
- 2015: "Elevators" (Fly Commons feat. Nio Tha Gift, Erk Tha Jerk, Traxamillion) (he co-produced the beat)
