= Still Brazy =

2016 studio album by YG

Studio album by YG
- Released: June 14, 2016
- Studios: Encore (Burbank); The Mothership (Inglewood); Paramount (Hollywood); Poolside (Universal City); UMPG (Santa Monica)
- Genres: West Coast hip-hop; gangsta rap; G-funk
- Length: 47:50
- Labels: 4Hunnid; CTE; Def Jam
- Producers: CT Beats; Hit-Boy; Larrance Dopson; P-Lo; Swish; Terrace Martin; Ty Dolla Sign

YG chronology
Blame It On the Streets (2014)	Still Brazy (2016)	Stay Dangerous (2018)

Singles from Still Brazy
- 1. "Twist My Fingaz" Released: July 16, 2015; 2. "FDT" Released: March 30, 2016; 3. "Why You Always Hatin?" Released: May 21, 2016

Still Brazy is the second studio album by American rapper YG. It was made available for streaming on June 14, 2016, by Apple Music. Later, it was released physically for the digital download purchases on June 17, 2016, by 4Hunnid Records, CTE World and Def Jam Recordings. The album features production handled by Swish, P-Lo, Terrace Martin, Larrance Dopson, CT Beats, Ty Dolla Sign and Hit-Boy, while YG enlisted the collaborators such as Lil Wayne, Drake, Nipsey Hussle and Slim 400, among others.

Still Brazy was supported by three singles: "Twist My Fingaz", "FDT" and "Why You Always Hatin?" The album received widespread acclaim from critics and debuted at number six on the US Billboard 200, earning 38,000 album-equivalent units in its first week. It was certified gold by the Recording Industry Association of America (RIAA).

== Promotion ==
To promote the album release, YG released the track, "I Wanna Benz", was released on December 12, 2015. The song features guest appearances from American rappers Nipsey Hussle and 50 Cent, with production was provided by London on da Track. The track also premiered by Oliver El-Khatib on the twelfth episode of OVO Sound Radio. The album was made available for streaming on June 14, 2016. Later, it was released physically for the digital download purchases on June 17.

== Singles ==
The lead single from the album, "Twist My Fingaz", was released on July 16, 2015. The song was produced by Terrace Martin.

The second single from the album, "FDT" (stylized for "Fuck Donald Trump"), was released on March 30, 2016. The song features a guest appearance from American rapper Nipsey Hussle, with production was provided by Swish. Much of the original lyrics in the single version was censored and replaced with newer verses on the album, after YG revealed the government contacted his label regarding the song. On July 20, 2016, YG released a remixed version of the track, "FDT Part 2". The song features guest appearances from American rappers G-Eazy and Macklemore.

The third single from the album, "Why You Always Hatin?", was released on May 21, 2016. The song premiered by Oliver El-Khatib on OVO Sound Radio. The song features guest appearances from Canadian rapper Drake and American rapper Kamaiyah, with production was handled by CT Beats.

=== Promotional singles ===
The album's first promotional single, "Still Brazy", was released on June 3, 2016, alone with an accompanied music video. The track was produced by Ty Dolla Sign and Swish.

The album's second promotional single, "Word Is Bond", was released on July 29, 2016, alone with an accompanied music video. The song features a guest appearance from American rapper Slim 400, with production was handled by P-Lo.

== Critical reception ==
Professional ratings
Aggregate scores
Source	Rating
AnyDecentMusic?	7.7/10
Metacritic	83/100
Review scores
Source	Rating
AllMusic	4/5 stars
Consequence	B+
Crack	8/10
Exclaim!	8/10
HipHopDX	4.2/5
Pitchfork	8.0/10
PopMatters	8/10
Slant Magazine	4/5 stars
Spin	8/10
Tiny Mix Tapes	4/5

Still Brazy was met with widespread critical acclaim. At Metacritic, which assigns a normalized rating out of 100 to reviews from mainstream publications, the album received an average score of 83, based on 14 reviews. Aggregator AnyDecentMusic? gave it 7.7 out of 10, based on their assessment of the critical consensus.

David Jeffries of AllMusic said, "A heavy album that doesn't pander to what's PC, what's on the radio, or what safe, suburban America believes." Martín Caballero of The Boston Globe said, "Here, it's less about what Y.G. does than how he does it; digging deeper into vintage G-funk flavors with a blend of personal, party, and political tracks, the young Compton rapper takes a sizzling step forward." Michael Madden of Consequence said, "It's full of the kind of warm G-funk that never fails to transport you to the part of the country it belongs to." Exclaim!'s Themistoklis Alexis gave the album a positive review, writing that it succeeds in "evoking the crown jewels of West Coast hip-hop royalty." Trent Clark of HipHopDX said, "Still Brazy is a testament that real-life experience breeds the best music but we can do without the shootouts from this point on."

Grant Rindner of PopMatters said, "No one out there is crafting visceral street tales like he is, and if he could just trim his track lists a bit, he has the talent to make a gangster rap classic in the future." Patrick Taylor of RapReviews said, "While most of the album is concerned with asserting that YG is still a G despite his fame, it closes with a trio of protest songs." Jon Caramanica of The New York Times said, "Still Brazy is an artisanal, proletarian Los Angeles gangster rap record, less tribute to the sound's golden age than a full-throated and wholly absorbed recitation." Sheldon Pearce of Pitchfork said, "Still Brazy solidifies YG as a torch-bearer for west coast gangster rap." Sam C. Mac of Slant Magazine said, "Make no mistake—musically and lyrically, this is an expansion." Drew Millard of Spin said, "YG has gone and done himself one better, creating a record that stands tall alongside the full-lengths he once mined."

=== Rankings ===
Select rankings of Still Brazy
Publication	List	Rank	Ref.
2DOPEBOYZ	Best Hip Hop Albums of 2016	6	
Billboard	50 Best Albums of 2016	27	
Complex	The 50 Best Albums of 2016	19	
Fact	The 50 Best Albums of 2016	14	
Pitchfork	The 50 Best Albums of 2016	22	
PopMatters	The 70 Best Albums of 2016	47	
Spin	The 50 Best Albums of 2016	39	
Stereogum	The 50 Best Albums of 2016	32	

== Commercial performance ==
Still Brazy debuted at number six on the Billboard 200, earning 38,000 album-equivalent units, (including 28,000 copies in pure albums sales) in its first week. It marked YG's second top ten debut on the chart. On July 22, 2020, the album was certified gold by the Recording Industry Association of America (RIAA) for combined sales and album-equivalent units of over 500,000 units in the United States.

== Track listing ==
Credits were adapted from the album's liner notes.

Still Brazy track listing
No.	Title	Writer(s)	Producer(s)	Length
1.	"Pops Hot Intro"	Ulysses Jackson		0:14
2.	"Don't Come to LA" (featuring Sad Boy, A.D. and Bricc Baby)	Keenon Jackson; Samuel Ahana; Armand Douglas; Zihirr Mitchell; Mario Hernandez	Swish	3:35
3.	"Who Shot Me?"	K. Jackson; Ahana; Paloma Ford; Samuel "Sam Hook" Jean	Swish	3:47
4.	"Word Is Bond" (featuring Slim 400)	K. Jackson; Paulo Rodriguez; Vincent Cohran	P-Lo	3:16
5.	"Twist My Fingaz"	K. Jackson; Terrace Martin; George Clinton Jr.; Walter Morrison; Garry Shider	Martin	4:14
6.	"Good Times Interlude" (featuring Syke 800, Duce, Marley Blu and Burnt Out)	K. Jackson; Martin; Clinton Jr.; Morrison; Shider		0:38
7.	"Gimmie Got Shot"	K. Jackson; Ahana; Brandon Monroe	Swish	2:46
8.	"I Got a Question" (featuring Lil Wayne)	K. Jackson; Larrance Dopson; Dwayne Carter Jr.	Dopson; YG^{[a]}	3:38
9.	"Why You Always Hatin?" (featuring Drake and Kamaiyah)	K. Jackson; Clarence Thomas; Aubrey Graham; Kamaiyah Johnson; August Moon; Thomas Tyrone	CT Beats; Kamaiyah^{[b]}	3:16
10.	"My Perception" (featuring Slim 400)	Cohran		0:14
11.	"Bool, Balm & Bollective"	K. Jackson; Martin; Ahana	Martin	3:35
12.	"She Wish She Was" (featuring Joe Moses and Jay 305)	K. Jackson; Dopson; Lamar Edwards; Marcus White; Dedrick Rolison; O'Shea Jackson Jr.; Jay Cummins; Joseph Allen	Dopson	3:57
13.	"YG Be Safe" (featuring The Homegirl)	Traysha Williams		0:03
14.	"Still Brazy"	K. Jackson; Tyrone Griffin Jr.; Ahana; William Curtis; John Flippin	Ty Dolla Sign; Swish	3:22
15.	"FDT" (featuring Nipsey Hussle)	K. Jackson; Ahana; Ermias Asghedom; Steve Carless; Oscar Jackson	Swish	3:46
16.	"Blacks & Browns" (featuring Sad Boy)	K. Jackson; Rodriguez; Hernandez; Nye Lee	P-Lo	4:10
17.	"Police Get Away wit Murder"	K. Jackson; Chauncey Hollis	Hit-Boy	3:19
Total length:				47:50

Notes

- ^{^[a]} signifies a co-producer
- ^{^[b]} signifies an additional producer
- "Who Shot Me?" contains additional vocals by Chelsea Davis, Knock Squared, and Paloma Ford
- "Gimmie Got Shot" contains additional vocals by Nano and Tanea

== Personnel ==
Credits for Still Brazy adapted from AllMusic.

- Jay 305 – featured artist
- Zachary Acosta – mixing assistant
- AD – featured artist
- Derek "MixedByAli" Ali – mixing
- Matt Anthony – engineer
- Bricc Baby – featured artist
- Marley Blu – featured artist
- Dee Brown – engineer
- Matt Burnette-Lemon – package design
- Burnt Out – featured artist
- Miriah Renee Carey – vocals
- Steve Carless – executive producer
- Vincent Cohran – vocals
- Dashone Wright – vocals
- Chelsea Davis – vocals
- Neil Denning – engineer
- Larrance Dopson – keyboards
- Drake – featured artist
- Duce – featured artist
- Paloma Ford – vocals
- Kenneth Gayton – vocals
- Chris Gehringer – mastering
- Tyquan Givens – vocals
- Hit-Boy – producer
- The Homegirl – featured artist
- Nipsey Hussle – featured artist
- Keenon Jackson – executive producer
- Ulysses Jackson – vocals
- Brandon Jones – vocals
- Kamaiyah – additional production, featured artist
- Nye Lee Jr. – assistant executive producer, vocals
- Ro Lexx – photography
- Lil' Wayne – featured artist
- Travis Margis – engineer
- Terrace Martin – keyboards, producer
- Marquis Medina – vocals
- Mike Miller – cover photo
- Brandon Moore – keyboards
- Joe Moses – featured artist
- Caroline Bentley Noble – vocals
- P-Lo – producer
- Adam Pena – engineer
- Sad Boy – featured artist
- Sickamore – executive producer
- Slim 400 – featured artist
- Knock Squared – vocals
- Swish – keyboards, producer
- Syke 800 – featured artist
- Ty Dolla Sign – producer
- Marlon Williams – guitar
- Traysha Williams – vocals
- YG – primary artist, vocals

== Charts ==
=== Weekly charts ===
Chart performance for Still Brazy
Chart (2016)	Peak position
Australian Albums (ARIA)	24
Belgian Albums (Ultratop Flanders)	151
Canadian Albums (Billboard)	19
New Zealand Albums (RMNZ)	39
Swiss Albums (Schweizer Hitparade)	58
US Billboard 200	6
US Top R&B/Hip-Hop Albums (Billboard)	3

=== Year-end charts ===
2016 year-end chart performance for Still Brazy
Chart (2016)	Position
US Billboard 200	182
US Top R&B/Hip-Hop Albums (Billboard)	44

== Certifications ==
Certifications for Still Brazy
Region	Certification	Certified units/sales
United States (RIAA)	Gold	500,000^{‡}
^{‡} Sales+streaming figures based on certification alone.
