= Sheletta Brundidge =

American children's author (born 1972)

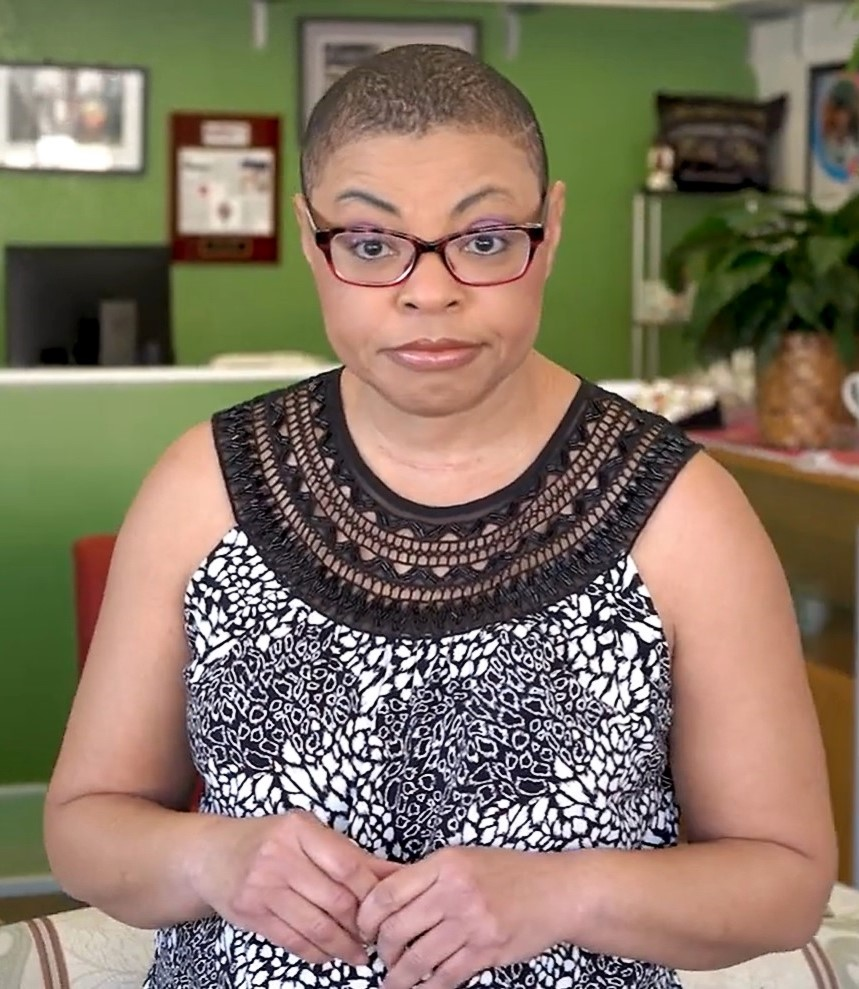
- Brundidge in a 2022 video promoting the COVID vaccine for Ramsey County, Minnesota
- Born: 1972 (age 53–54)
- Education: University of Houston
- Occupations: Children's author; Comedian; Activist; Podcaster
- Children: 4
- Writing career
- Notable awards: USA Today's Women of the Year (2022); Anthem Award for Leader of the Year (2022)
- Website: shelettamakesmelaugh.com

Sheletta Brundidge is an American children's author, an Emmy Award winning comedian, and a local activist. Brundidge has focused on autism in her books, and is an advocate for autistic people and children. She is the author of Brandon Spots His Sign, which was inspired by her autistic son Brandon drawing inspiration from Let's Go Brandon signs around his neighborhood.

== Personal life ==
Brundidge grew up in Texas and earned her B.S. from the University of Houston in radio and television broadcasting. Brundidge is the mother of four children, three of whom are on the autism spectrum. After seeking support services from Texas for her children, she was told the waiting list was "at least ten years", prompting her and her family to move out of Texas to Minnesota.

== Career ==
=== Books ===
Brundidge published her first book, Cameron Goes to School, in April 2020. She cites her frustration over the lack of children's books focusing on autism in Black children as motivation in creating the book.

In April 2021, Brundidge published Daniel Finds His Voice after watching her son, Daniel, respond well to learning through music.

In April 2022, Brundidge published Brandon Spots His Sign after her son, Brandon, became excited over spotting Let's Go Brandon signs. In response to her book, Brandon received a signed letter from President Biden, and also formed a friendship with Brandon Brown, whose name originated the phrase. Brown stated their meeting was a chance to "reclaim a phrase that he feels has gotten too nasty".

=== Activism ===
Brundidge cites her family's personal experience with autism as the driving force behind her advocacy. Brundidge has worked with Minnesota police to improve police encounters with non-verbal citizens and the NFL in support of sensory friendly restrooms in football stadiums. She has also collaborated with the Minnesota Department of Health on autism testing for families of color.

Brundidge has advocated for public awareness on carbon monoxide detectors after losing five family members to carbon monoxide poisoning in 2020.

In Minnesota, a school bus carrying 20 children was put in danger after the bus driver suffered a medical injury. Then a local store clerk, Embro Ahmed, sprang into action, stopping the bus and saving the children inside. Ahmed's action moved Author Sheletta Brundidge, who planned a secret event to surprise Ahmed with a $1,000 check for his heroic deed. The surprise touched Ahmed, and he later said, "I really felt like it was my duty. "Also, too, it's kids we're talking about, you know. Even if I were to die, it would still be worth it."

=== Podcasting ===
Brundidge runs a production company for her podcast Sheletta Makes Me Laugh.

== Published works ==
- Cameron Goes to School (2020; co-authored with Lily Coyle)
- Daniel Finds His Voice (2021; co-authored with Lily Coyle)
- Brandon Spots His Sign (2022; co-authored with Lily Coyle)
- A Walk to the Store (2022; co-authored with Judeah Reynolds)
- Andrew Does His Dance (2024; co-authored with Andrew James Brundidge)

== Honors ==
Brundidge was named as one of USA Today's women of the year in 2022, which recognizes women who have made a significant impact.

In 2022, Brundidge was the Anthem Award for Leader of the Year in the Human and Civil Rights category.
