= 2021 Sparks 300 =

28th race of the 2021 NASCAR Xfinity Series

Race details
- Race 28 of 33 in the 2021 NASCAR Xfinity Series season
- Date: October 2, 2021
- Location: Talladega Superspeedway in Lincoln, Alabama
- Course: Permanent racing facility
- Course length: 2.66 miles (4.80 km)
- Distance: 113 laps, 300.58 mi (483.74 km)
- Average speed: 128.486 miles per hour (206.778 km/h)

Pole position
Driver	Justin Allgaier	JR Motorsports
- Grid positions set by competition-based formula

Most laps led
Driver	Riley Herbst	Stewart-Haas Racing
- Laps: 26

Winner
No. 68	Brandon Brown	Brandonbilt Motorsports

Television in the United States
- Network: NBCSN
- Announcers: Dale Earnhardt Jr., Jeff Burton, and Steve Letarte

Radio in the United States
- Radio: Motor Racing Network

The 2021 Sparks 300 was a NASCAR Xfinity Series race held on October 2, 2021, at Talladega Superspeedway in Lincoln, Alabama. Contested over 107 laps—shortened from 113 laps due to darkness, on the 2.66 mi (4.28 km) asphalt superspeedway, it was the 28th race of the 2021 NASCAR Xfinity Series season, the second race of the Playoffs, and the second race of the Round of 12. After "The Big One" occurred late, Brandon Brown was determined as the leader at the time of caution. The race was then called due to darkness, leading to his first career Xfinity series victory.

After the race, Brown unwittingly became associated with politics when NBC Sports reporter Kelli Stavast's misstating of a crowd chant led to "Let's Go Brandon" becoming a political slogan used against U.S. President Joe Biden.

== Report ==
=== Background ===
Talladega Superspeedway, originally known as Alabama International Motor Superspeedway (AIMS), is a motorsports complex located north of Talladega, Alabama. It is located on the former Anniston Air Force Base in the small city of Lincoln. The track is a tri-oval and was constructed in the 1960s by the International Speedway Corporation, a business controlled by the France family. Talladega is most known for its steep banking and the unique location of the start/finish line that's located just past the exit to pit road. The track currently hosts the NASCAR series such as the NASCAR Cup Series, Xfinity Series and the Camping World Truck Series. Talladega is the longest NASCAR oval with a length of 2.66-mile-long (4.28 km) tri-oval like the Daytona International Speedway, which also is a 2.5-mile-long (4 km) tri-oval.

=== Entry list ===
- (R) denotes rookie driver.
- (i) denotes driver who is ineligible for series driver points.

No.	Driver	Team	Make
0	Jeffrey Earnhardt	JD Motorsports	Chevrolet
1	Josh Berry (R)	JR Motorsports	Chevrolet
2	Myatt Snider	Richard Childress Racing	Chevrolet
02	Brett Moffitt	Our Motorsports	Chevrolet
4	Landon Cassill	JD Motorsports	Chevrolet
5	Matt Mills	B. J. McLeod Motorsports	Toyota
6	Ryan Vargas (R)	JD Motorsports	Chevrolet
7	Justin Allgaier	JR Motorsports	Chevrolet
07	Joe Graf Jr.	SS-Green Light Racing	Chevrolet
8	Sam Mayer (R)	JR Motorsports	Chevrolet
9	Noah Gragson	JR Motorsports	Chevrolet
10	Jeb Burton	Kaulig Racing	Chevrolet
11	Justin Haley	Kaulig Racing	Chevrolet
13	Timmy Hill (i)	MBM Motorsports	Toyota
15	Bayley Currey	JD Motorsports	Chevrolet
16	A. J. Allmendinger	Kaulig Racing	Chevrolet
17	Garrett Smithley	SS-Green Light Racing with Rick Ware Racing	Chevrolet
18	Daniel Hemric	Joe Gibbs Racing	Toyota
19	Brandon Jones	Joe Gibbs Racing	Toyota
20	Harrison Burton	Joe Gibbs Racing	Toyota
22	Austin Cindric	Team Penske	Ford
23	Blaine Perkins	Our Motorsports	Chevrolet
26	Santino Ferrucci	Sam Hunt Racing	Toyota
31	Jordan Anderson (i)	Jordan Anderson Racing	Chevrolet
36	Alex Labbé	DGM Racing	Chevrolet
39	Ryan Sieg	RSS Racing	Ford
44	Tommy Joe Martins	Martins Motorsports	Chevrolet
47	Kyle Weatherman	Mike Harmon Racing	Chevrolet
48	Jade Buford (R)	Big Machine Racing Team	Chevrolet
51	Jeremy Clements	Jeremy Clements Racing	Chevrolet
52	Joey Gase	Means Racing	Chevrolet
54	John Hunter Nemechek (i)	Joe Gibbs Racing	Toyota
61	David Starr	Hattori Racing Enterprises	Toyota
66	Jason White	MBM Motorsports	Toyota
68	Brandon Brown	Brandonbilt Motorsports	Chevrolet
74	C. J. McLaughlin	Mike Harmon Racing	Chevrolet
78	Mason Massey	B. J. McLeod Motorsports	Toyota
90	Caesar Bacarella	DGM Racing	Chevrolet
92	Josh Williams	DGM Racing	Chevrolet
98	Riley Herbst	Stewart-Haas Racing	Ford
99	J. J. Yeley	B. J. McLeod Motorsports	Chevy
Official entry list

== Qualifying ==
Justin Allgaier was awarded the pole for the race as determined by competition-based formula. Timmy Hill did not have enough points to qualify for the race.

=== Starting lineup ===
Pos	No	Driver	Team	Manufacturer
1	7	Justin Allgaier	JR Motorsports	Chevrolet
2	22	Austin Cindric	Team Penske	Ford
3	1	Josh Berry (R)	JR Motorsports	Chevrolet
4	9	Noah Gragson	JR Motorsports	Chevrolet
5	16	A. J. Allmendinger	Kaulig Racing	Chevrolet
6	18	Daniel Hemric	Joe Gibbs Racing	Toyota
7	19	Brandon Jones	Joe Gibbs Racing	Toyota
8	11	Justin Haley	Kaulig Racing	Chevrolet
9	20	Harrison Burton	Joe Gibbs Racing	Toyota
10	2	Myatt Snider	Richard Childress Racing	Chevrolet
11	54	John Hunter Nemechek (i)	Joe Gibbs Racing	Toyota
12	8	Sam Mayer (R)	JR Motorsports	Chevrolet
13	98	Riley Herbst	Stewart-Haas Racing	Ford
14	10	Jeb Burton	Kaulig Racing	Chevrolet
15	51	Jeremy Clements	Jeremy Clements Racing	Chevrolet
16	02	Brett Moffitt	Our Motorsports	Chevrolet
17	39	Ryan Sieg	RSS Racing	Ford
18	44	Tommy Joe Martins	Martins Motorsports	Chevrolet
19	68	Brandon Brown	Brandonbilt Motorsports	Chevrolet
20	15	Bayley Currey (i)	JD Motorsports	Chevrolet
21	4	Landon Cassill	JD Motorsports	Chevrolet
22	6	Ryan Vargas (R)	JD Motorsports	Chevrolet
23	23	Blaine Perkins	Our Motorsports	Chevrolet
24	92	Josh Williams	DGM Racing	Chevrolet
25	47	Kyle Weatherman	Mike Harmon Racing	Chevrolet
26	48	Jade Buford (R)	Big Machine Racing Team	Chevrolet
27	78	Mason Massey	B. J. McLeod Motorsports	Toyota
28	61	David Starr	Hattori Racing Enterprises	Toyota
29	31	Jordan Anderson (i)	Jordan Anderson Racing	Chevrolet
30	5	Matt Mills	B. J. McLeod Motorsports	Toyota
31	0	Jeffrey Earnhardt	JR Motorsports	Chevrolet
32	36	Alex Labbé	DGM Racing	Chevrolet
33	26	Santino Ferrucci	Sam Hunt Racing	Toyota
34	66	Jason White	MBM Motorsports	Toyota
35	17	Garrett Smithley	SS-Green Light Racing with Rick Ware Racing	Chevrolet
36	74	C. J. McLaughlin	Mike Harmon Racing	Chevrolet
37	90	Caesar Bacarella	DGM Racing	Chevrolet
38	99	J. J. Yeley	B. J. McLeod Motorsports	Chevrolet
39	52	Joey Gase	Means Motorsports	Chevrolet
40	07	Joe Graf Jr.	SS-Green Light Racing	Chevrolet
Failed to qualify
41	13	Timmy Hill (i)	MBM Motorsports	Toyota
Official qualifying results

== Race ==
=== Race results ===
==== Stage Results ====
Stage One Laps: 25

Pos	No	Driver	Team	Manufacturer	Points
1	54	John Hunter Nemechek (i)	Joe Gibbs Racing	Toyota	0
2	10	Jeb Burton	Kaulig Racing	Chevrolet	9
3	98	Riley Herbst	Stewart-Haas Racing	Ford	8
4	22	Austin Cindric	Team Penske	Ford	7
5	20	Harrison Burton	Joe Gibbs Racing	Toyota	6
6	2	Myatt Snider	Richard Childress Racing	Chevrolet	5
7	7	Justin Allgaier	JR Motorsports	Chevrolet	4
8	19	Brandon Jones	Joe Gibbs Racing	Toyota	3
9	23	Blaine Perkins	Our Motorsports	Chevrolet	2
10	18	Daniel Hemric	Joe Gibbs Racing	Toyota	1

Stage Two Laps: 25

Pos	No	Driver	Team	Manufacturer	Points
1	23	Blaine Perkins	Our Motorsports	Chevrolet	10
2	02	Brett Moffitt	Our Motorsports	Chevrolet	9
3	54	John Hunter Nemechek (i)	Joe Gibbs Racing	Toyota	0
4	98	Riley Herbst	Stewart-Haas Racing	Ford	7
5	7	Justin Allgaier	JR Motorsports	Chevrolet	6
6	10	Jeb Burton	Kaulig Racing	Chevrolet	5
7	20	Harrison Burton	Joe Gibbs Racing	Toyota	4
8	11	Justin Haley	Kaulig Racing	Chevrolet	3
9	22	Austin Cindric	Team Penske	Ford	2
10	9	Noah Gragson	JR Motorsports	Chevrolet	1

=== Final Stage Results ===
Laps:

Pos	Grid	No	Driver	Team	Manufacturer	Laps	Points	Status
1	19	68	Brandon Brown	Brandonbilt Motorsports	Chevrolet	107	40	Running
2	7	19	Brandon Jones	Joe Gibbs Racing	Toyota	107	38	Running
3	1	7	Justin Allgaier	JR Motorsports	Chevrolet	107	44	Running
4	6	18	Daniel Hemric	Joe Gibbs Racing	Toyota	107	34	Running
5	29	31	Jordan Anderson (i)	Jordan Anderson Racing	Chevrolet	107	0	Running
6	8	11	Justin Haley	Kaulig Racing	Chevrolet	107	34	Running
7	14	10	Jeb Burton	Kaulig Racing	Chevrolet	107	44	Running
8	2	22	Austin Cindric	Team Penske	Ford	107	38	Running
9	3	1	Josh Berry	JR Motorsports	Chevrolet	107	28	Running
10	40	07	Joe Graf Jr.	SS-Green Light Racing	Chevrolet	107	27	Running
11	17	39	Ryan Sieg	RSS Racing	Ford	107	26	Running
12	26	48	Jade Buford	Big Machine Racing Team	Chevrolet	107	25	Running
13	23	23	Blaine Perkins	Our Motorsports	Chevrolet	107	36	Running
14	24	92	Josh Williams	DGM Racing	Chevrolet	107	23	Running
15	39	52	Joey Gase	Jimmy Means Racing	Ford	107	22	Running
16	38	17	J. J. Yeley	B. J. McLeod Motorsports	Chevrolet	107	21	Running
17	33	26	Santino Ferrucci	Sam Hunt Racing	Toyota	107	20	Running
18	18	44	Tommy Joe Martins	Martins Motorsports	Chevrolet	107	19	Running
19	35	17	Garrett Smithley	SS-Green Light Racing with Rick Ware Racing	Chevrolet	107	18	Running
20	25	47	Kyle Weatherman	Mike Harmon Racing	Chevrolet	107	17	Running
21	32	36	Alex Labbé	DGM Racing	Chevrolet	107	16	Running
22	11	54	John Hunter Nemechek (i)	Joe Gibbs Racing	Toyota	107	0	Running
23	30	5	Matt Mills	B. J. McLeod Motorsports	Toyota	106	14	Running
24	15	51	Jeremy Clements	Jeremy Clements Racing	Chevrolet	104	13	Running
25	9	20	Harrison Burton	Joe Gibbs Racing	Toyota	101	22	Accident
26	16	02	Brett Moffitt	Our Motorsports	Chevrolet	101	20	Accident
27	13	98	Riley Herbst	Stewart-Haas Racing	Ford	101	25	Accident
28	34	66	Jason White	MBM Motorsports	Ford	101	9	Accident
29	31	0	Jeffrey Earnhardt	JD Motorsports	Chevrolet	93	8	Accident
30	4	9	Noah Gragson	JR Motorsports	Chevrolet	88	8	Accident
31	10	2	Myatt Snider	Richard Childress Racing	Chevrolet	88	11	Accident
32	37	90	Caesar Bacarella	DGM Racing	Chevrolet	88	5	Accident
33	22	6	Ryan Vargas	JD Motorsports	Chevrolet	88	4	Accident
34	36	74	C. J. McLaughlin	Mike Harmon Racing	Chevrolet	88	3	Accident
35	27	78	Mason Massey	B. J. McLeod Motorsports	Toyota	88	2	Accident
36	20	15	Bayley Currey (i)	JD Motorsports	Chevrolet	73	0	Driveshaft
37	21	4	Landon Cassill	JD Motorsports	Chevrolet	50	1	Engine
38	12	8	Sam Mayer	JR Motorsports	Chevrolet	24	1	Accident
39	5	16	A. J. Allmendinger	Kaulig Racing	Chevrolet	24	1	Accident
40	28	61	David Starr	Hattori Racing Enterprises	Toyota	20	1	Engine
Official race results

=== Race statistics ===
- Lead changes: 33 among 17 different drivers
- Cautions/Laps: 5 for 21
- Time of race: 2 hours, 4 minutes, and 55 seconds
- Average speed: 128.486 mph (206.778 km/h)

Previous race: 2021 Alsco Uniforms 302	NASCAR Xfinity Series; 2021 season	Next race: 2021 Drive for the Cure 250
