= Vans (song) =

2006 single by the Pack

Single by the Pack

from the album Based Boys and the EP Skateboards 2 Scrapers
- Released: September 12, 2006
- Genre: West Coast hip hop; hyphy
- Length: 4:15
- Label: Up All Nite; Jive
- Songwriters: Brandon McCartney; DaMonte Johnson; Keith Jenkins; Lloyd Omadhebo
- Producer: Young L

The Pack singles chronology
"Vans" (2006)	"I'm Shinin'" (2006)

Music video
- "Vans (Main Version)" on YouTube

"Vans" is the debut single by American hip hop group the Pack, released in 2006 as the lead single from their EP Skateboards 2 Scrapers (2006). It is their most successful song, peaking at number 58 on the Billboard Hot 100. The title references the skate shoe brand of the same name.

== Background ==
Young L created the beat for the song in five minutes. When Lil B heard the beat, he blurted out the lyrics that would become the chorus: "Got my Vans on but they look like sneakers." The Pack first released the song on their MySpace page. It became a surprise hit for them and caught the attention of rapper Too Short, who then signed the Pack to his Up All Nite label.

A music video for the song was released in August 2006 and aired on BET, but MTV and MTV Jams refused to show the video because it promoted a consumer product. However, MTV aired an edited version of the video, in which the word "Vans" was censored throughout the song. The song was released to streaming services on September 12, 2006.

== Critical reception ==
The song was placed at number 5 on Rolling Stone's "Best Songs of 2006" list.

== Remixes ==
An official remix of the song featuring Too Short and rapper Mistah F.A.B. was released from Skateboards 2 Scrapers. Rapper Lil Wayne also released a freestyle to the song.

== Charts ==
Chart (2006)	Peak position
US Billboard Hot 100	58
