= Let's Go Brandon (song) =

Single by Loza Alexander

from the album Lets Go Brandon
- Released: October 10, 2021
- Recorded: 2021
- Genre: Hip hop
- Length: 2:23; 3:52 (extended version)
- Songwriter: Shawn Michael Loza
- Producer: Loza Alexander

Loza Alexander singles chronology
"All by Myself Diss" (2021)	"Let's Go Brandon" (2021)	"Questions Like Nicki" (2021)

"Let's Go Brandon" is a protest song written, produced, and performed by American rapper Loza Alexander, released as a single on October 21, 2021. It criticizes Joe Biden, the 46th and then-current president of the United States, and the mainstream media. Its title, which is repeated in the chorus, is based on "Let's Go Brandon", a political slogan used as a minced oath or euphemism for "Fuck Joe Biden".

"Let's Go Brandon" peaked at number 38 on the Billboard Hot 100, number 98 on the Global 200, and number ten on the Hot R&B/Hip Hop Songs chart.

== Background ==
The song is a protest song and is based on the political slogan and meme, "Let's Go Brandon", which is repeated in the chorus, that became popular as a minced oath for "Fuck Joe Biden". Alexander has worked extensively with music executive LJ Fino, who negotiated a distribution and publishing deal with Create Music Group on behalf of Alexander.

== Music video ==
In the music video, Alexander is seen wearing a red "Make Music Great Again" hat about the "Make America Great Again" campaign slogan Donald Trump used in his 2016, 2020 and 2024 presidential campaigns. The song heavily samples the spoken dialogue "Let's Go, Brandon" by reporter Kelli Stavast, as well as the "Fuck Joe Biden" chants, taken from a televised interview of driver Brandon Brown at the NASCAR Xfinity Series race Sparks 300 on October 2, 2021.

== Commercial performance ==
The song debuted at number 45 on the US Billboard Hot 100 chart for the week ending October 30, 2021. It has since entered the top 40 of the Hot 100 chart, peaking at number 38.

Chart performance for "Let's Go Brandon"
Chart (2021)	Peak position
Global 200 (Billboard)	98
US Billboard Hot 100	38
US Hot R&B/Hip-Hop Songs (Billboard)	10

== See also ==
- FDT (song)
