= Skateboards 2 Scrapers =

EP by The Pack
- Released: December 19, 2006
- Genres: Hip-hop; hyphy
- Length: 23:33
- Labels: Up All Nite; Jive
- Producer: Young L

The Pack chronology
Wolfpack Muzik, Vol. 2 (2006)	Skateboards 2 Scrapers (2006)	Based Boys (2007)

Skateboards 2 Scrapers is the only EP by American hip-hop group the Pack. It was released through Up All Nite, an imprint of Jive Records, on December 19, 2006. The EP follows the Pack's breakout hit "Vans" (2006). Skateboards 2 Scrapers was produced entirely by the Pack member Young L, who was the group's main producer. The EP received mixed reception from reviewers, who mostly criticized the lyrics.

== Background and release ==
The Pack was formed in Berkeley, California in 2005, and consisted of four rappers: Lil B, Young L, Stunnaman, and Lil Uno. They released their breakout hit "Vans" in 2006, and subsequently signed to rapper Too Short's Jive Records imprint Up All Nite. The Pack released Skateboards 2 Scrapers, their debut EP, on December 19, 2006. A music video was later released for the song "I'm Shinin'".

== Composition ==
Skateboards 2 Scrapers consists of seven songs and one remix. It is a hip hop album, with lyrics mostly about money and sex. Produced by the Pack's main producer Young L, the EP features slowed, sound-effect driven hyphy beats. Skateboards 2 Scrapers opens with "Vans", a song about the skateboarding shoe brand Vans. Its instrumental is a mix of Bay Area hyphy and Dem Franchize Boyz-inspired snap. The following song "I'm Shinin'" features exaggerated vocal deliveries, and lyrics about owning diamonds. The songs "Ride My Bike" and "Candy" contains bass-heavy production and simplistic lyrics. Steve "Flash" Juon of RapReviews wrote that "Oh Go" is "the most hyphy of any song on the album". Its beat incorporates heavy bass hits combined with "a noise that can only be described as the air horn from a hockey game when goals get scored", according to Juon.

== Critical reception ==
Professional ratings
Review scores
Source	Rating
AllMusic	2.5/5 stars
HipHopDX	2.5/5
PopMatters	3/10

Skateboards 2 Scrapers received mixed reviews. Juon wrote that "none of the lyricism displayed by the group is excessively impressive." AllMusic's Marisa Brown said the EP lacked the "quirkiness" of "Vans", and felt that its sexual themes were too predictable. HipHopDX's Dave Goodson considered the song "Oh Go" to be "a great example of what the group is capable of", but said the Pack failed to leave their comfort zone often enough to show their full potential. Goodson also criticized the group's lyricism, describing the lyrics on the songs "Candy" and "Ride My Bike" as "almost cringe worthy."

== Track listing ==
All tracks are produced by Young L.

No.	Title	Writer(s)	Length
1.	"Vans"	Brandon McCartney; DaMonte Johnson; Keith Jenkins; Lloyd Omadhebo	4:24
2.	"I'm Shinin'"	McCartney; Johnson; Jenkins; Omadhebo	3:42
3.	"Ride My Bike"	McCartney; Jenkins; Omadhebo	3:13
4.	"Candy"	McCartney; Johnson; Jenkins; Omadhebo	2:39
5.	"Oh Go"	McCartney; Jenkins; Omadhebo	2:58
6.	"Freaky Bopper"	McCartney; Johnson; Omadhebo	3:16
7.	"Vans Remix" (featuring Too Short and Mistah F.A.B.)	McCartney; Johnson; Jenkins; Omadhebo; Todd Shaw; Stanley Cox	3:18
Total length:			23:33

Digital release
No.	Title	Writer(s)	Length
4.	"Dum Ditty Dum" (featuring Too Short)	McCartney; Johnson; Jenkins; Omadhebo	2:41
Total length:			26:11

=== Notes ===
- "Candy" and "Oh Go" are swapped on the digital release

== Credits and personnel ==
Production

- Todd Shaw – executive producer
- Young L – producer
- Leslie Brathwaite – mixing (all tracks)
- Brian Stanley – mixing (2)
- Don "DJ Snake" Brown – mixing (7)
- James Cruz – mastering

Art

- Daniel Hastings – art direction, design, photography
- Jackie Murphy – creative direction
- Andrea von Bujdoss – graphics
