= Kamaiyah =

American rapper

- Born: Kamaiyah Jamesha Johnson; March 13, 1992 (age 34); Oakland, California, U.S.
- Genres: West Coast hip-hop; R&B
- Occupations: Rapper; singer
- Years active: 2015–present
- Labels: GRND.WRK; 4Hunnid; Geffen; Interscope

Kamaiyah Jamesha Johnson (born March 13, 1992) is an American rapper and singer from Oakland, California. She is best known for her guest appearance alongside Drake on fellow West Coast rapper YG's 2016 single "Why You Always Hatin", which entered the Billboard Hot 100. Her debut mixtape, A Good Night in the Ghetto (2016), was released later that year to critical acclaim.

In 2017, Kamaiyah was named as one of the ten of XXL's 2017 Freshman Class and released her second mixtape, Before I Wake (2017). In 2020, she founded the label GRND.WRK to release her third mixtape, Got It Made (2020).

== Career ==
Kamaiyah Johnson was born in Oakland, California. She is inspired by her favorite childhood 1990s artists such as TLC, Missy Elliott, and Aaliyah. Her debut single "How Does It Feel", premiered late in 2015, was ranked one of the year's best songs by Pitchfork and NPR.

She released her debut mixtape, A Good Night in the Ghetto, in March 2016 to critical acclaim. Complex placed it at number 21 on the "50 Best Albums of 2016" list. Pitchfork placed it at number 47 on the "50 Best Albums of 2016" list. Rolling Stone placed it at number 17 on the "40 Best Rap Albums of 2016" list. The Guardian named it one of the 15 best mixtapes of 2016. Music videos were created for "Out the Bottle", "How Does It Feel", "For My Dawg", "F*ck It Up", "Mo Money Mo Problems", "I'm On", and "Freaky Freaks".

After releasing her debut mixtape, Kamaiyah performed at South by Southwest that month in Austin, Texas. That year she was also featured, along with Drake, on YG's "Why You Always Hatin?", a single from his 2016 Still Brazy. Later that year, Kamaiyah performed as an opener for YG on his Fuck Donald Trump Tour. Kamaiyah signed to Interscope Records in 2016.

On June 13, 2017, Kamaiyah was named as one of the ten of XXL's "2017 Freshman Class" along with A Boogie wit da Hoodie, PnB Rock, Playboi Carti, Ugly God, Kyle, Aminé, MadeinTYO, Kap G, and XXXTentacion. Kamaiyah announced a mixtape, Don't Ever Get It Twisted, which was delayed and eventually shelved, due to sample clearance issues and problems with her major label contract. She instead self-released a second mixtape, Before I Wake, in 2017.

Kamaiyah appeared in a Sprite commercial alongside LeBron James, in early 2018. Kamaiyah left Interscope Records and 4Hunnid Records after her project Something to Ride To, was delayed multiple times. Kamaiyah launched her own label GRND.WRK and released her third mixtape, Got It Made, in 2020. The project was preceded by the single "1-800-IM-HORNY".

On September 18, 2020, Kamaiyah released Oakland Nights, a collaborative EP with fellow Bay Area artist, Capolow. The 10-track EP marks Kamaiyah's second project released under her label, GRND.WRK.

In March 2022 a music documentary about the Hyphy movement We Were Hyphy, was released. It featured Kamaiyah and other musicians that were inspired by Hyphy including G-Eazy, and P-Lo.

== Discography ==
=== EPs ===
List of extended plays (EPs)
Title	Album details
Oakland Nights	Released: September 18, 2020; Label: GRND.WRK; Format: Digital download, streaming
Divine Time	Released: May 27, 2022; Label: Keep It Lit Records; Format: Digital download, streaming
Keep It Lit	Released: December 9, 2022; Label: Keep It Lit Records; Format: Digital download, streaming

=== Mixtapes ===
List of mixtapes
Title	Album details
A Good Night in the Ghetto	Released: March 14, 2016; Label: Self-released; Format: Digital download
Before I Wake	Released: November 7, 2017; Label: Self-released; Format: Digital download
Got It Made	-: Released: February 21, 2020; Label: Self-released; Format: Digital download
Another Summer Night	Released: November 24, 2023; Label: Keep It Lit Records; Format: Digital Download

=== Singles ===
==== As lead artist ====
Title	Year	Album
"How Does It Feel"	2015	A Good Night in the Ghetto
"Break You Down"	2016	A Good Night in the Ghetto
"Nxggas"	2016	A Good Night in the Ghetto
"Windows"	2019	Got It Made
"Set It Up" (featuring Trina)	2020	Got It Made

==== As featured artist ====
Title	Year	Peak chart positions			Certifications	Album
Title	Year	US	US R&B/HH	US Rap	Certifications	Album
"Why You Always Hatin?" (YG featuring Drake and Kamaiyah)	2016	62	18	13	RIAA: Platinum	Still Brazy
"Petty" (E-40 featuring Kamaiyah)	2016	—	—	—		The D-Boy Diary (deluxe edition)

=== Guest appearances ===
List of non-single album appearances, with other performing artists, showing year released and album name
Title	Year	Other artist(s)	Album
"Money Like This"	2016	Stunna June	OTR 930
"All Around Me"	2017	Lil Yachty, YG	Teenage Emotions
"Ride"	2017	Keyshia Cole	11:11 Reset
"Do Not Disturb"	2019	G-Eazy, YG	4Real 4Real
"Do Yo Dance"	2019	Mitch, RJ, Ty Dolla $ign, YG	4Real 4Real
"Bullshit"	2020	Cardo, Jay Worthy	TBA
