= The Pack (group) =

American hip hop group

- Origin: Berkeley, California, U.S.
- Genres: Hip hop; West Coast hip hop; hyphy; cloud rap; frat rap
- Years active: 2005–2010; 2018; 2020
- Labels: Up All Nite; Jive; Zomba; Sony; Indie-Pop; SMC
- Past members: Lil B; Young L; Stunnaman; Lil Uno

The Pack was an American hip hop group formed in Berkeley, California in 2005. It was composed of rappers Lil B, Young L, Stunnaman, and Lil Uno. The group released the mixtapes Wolfpack Muzik, Vol. 1 in 2005 and Wolfpack Muzik, Vol. 2 in March 2006. The latter release featured "Vans", which received heavy radio play on the West Coast and became the Pack's best known song.

Following the success of "Vans", the Pack were signed to fellow Bay Area rapper Too Short's Jive Records imprint Up All Nite. They released two projects—Skateboards 2 Scrapers (2006) and Based Boys (2007)—before they were dropped from the label due to their commercial failure. They released their second album, Wolfpack Party, in 2010, which served as the Pack's final release before disbanding.

== History ==
Lloyd Omadhebo and Keith Jenkins—Young L and Stunnaman—met in sixth grade. They became friends over their shared interest in skateboarding and began experimenting with music. They soon met Brandon McCartney and DaMonte Johnson—Lil B and Lil Uno. In 2005, the four formed the group the Pack. They continued to experiment with music, and would record together at Young L's house.

As the Bay Area hyphy movement began to emerge, the Pack released their mixtape Wolfpack Muzik, Vol. 1 in 2005. It saw moderate success locally. In March 2006, The Pack released Wolfpack Muzik, Vol. 2. The mixtape featured the song "Vans", which received major radio play on the West Coast. It placed fifth on Rolling Stone's "Best Songs of 2006" list, charted on the Billboard Hot 100, and appeared on the Billboard Rhythmic chart for twelve weeks.

After fellow Bay Area rapper Too Short heard "Vans" on the radio, he called Lil Uno, saying he was interested in signing the Pack to his Jive Records imprint Up All Nite. The group signed to Up All Nite, and released their debut EP Skateboards 2 Scrapers on December 19, 2006. It was produced by Young L, and consisted of six songs, including a "Vans" remix which featured Mistah F.A.B. and Too Short.

The Pack released their debut studio album Based Boys on October 30, 2007. It received mixed reviews and was deemed a commercial failure, resulting in the group being dropped from Up All Nite. In the following years, Lil B embarked on a solo career which overshadowed that of the Pack. After the group signed to SMC Recordings, they released their second and final album Wolfpack Party on August 24, 2010.

Young L died in November 2026, at the age of 39.

== Discography ==
=== Mixtapes ===
- 2005: Wolfpack Muzik Vol. 1
- 2006: Wolfpack Muzik Vol. 2
- 2008: Wolfpack Musik Vol. 3: Screamin' Demons
- 2009: The Pack is Back
- 2020: Age

=== Extended plays ===
- 2006: Skateboards 2 Scrapers
- 2010: Sex on the Beach

=== Singles ===
- 2006: "Vans" (Skateboards 2 Scrapers and Based Boys)
- 2006: "I'm Shinin'" (Skateboards 2 Scrapers and Based Boys)
- 2007: "In My Car" (Based Boys)
- 2010: "Wolfpack Party 2010" (Wolfpack Party)
- 2010: "Sex on the Beach" (Wolfpack Party)
- 2010: "Dance Fl00r" (Wolfpack Party)
- 2018: "Why U Wanna Do That"
- 2018: "Clips Go"

=== Studio albums ===
List of studio albums, with selected chart positions
Title	Album details	Peak chart positions		
Title	Album details	US Heat	US R&B	US Ind
Based Boys	Released: October 30, 2007; Label: Up All Nite/Jive/Zomba/SME; Formats: CD, digital download	14	57	46
Wolfpack Party	Released: August 24, 2010; Label: Indie Pop, SMC; Formats: CD, digital download	13	65	—
"—" denotes a title that did not chart, or was not released in that territory.
