= FDT (song) =

2016 single by YG featuring Nipsey Hussle

Single by YG featuring Nipsey Hussle

from the album Still Brazy
- Released: March 30, 2016
- Recorded: 2016
- Genre: Political hip-hop
- Length: 3:46
- Label: 400; CTE; Def Jam
- Songwriters: Keenon Jackson; Ermias Asghedom; Samuel Ahana; Steve-O Carless; Oscar Jackson
- Producer: DJ Swish

YG singles chronology
"Twist My Fingaz" (2015)	"FDT" (2016)	"Why You Always Hatin?" (2016)

Nipsey Hussle singles chronology
"Do the Damn Thang" (2016)	"FDT" (2016)	"Dope" (2016)

Music video
- "FDT" on YouTube

"FDT" (also known by its uncensored full title "Fuck Donald Trump") is a protest song by American rapper YG featuring American rapper Nipsey Hussle, and is the second single from YG's second studio album Still Brazy. The song is a criticism of the policies of the Republican candidate in the 2016 US presidential election, Donald Trump, who would eventually win the 2016 presidential election.

== Recording ==
According to the rappers, the track was recorded in about an hour, and was inspired by Hussle's positive experience of working with Mexican immigrants to the US. It begins with soundbites from several black protesters who were ejected from a Trump rally in Valdosta, Georgia.

In April 2016, the LAPD shut down a video shoot for the song being filmed on the corner of Crenshaw Boulevard and 71st Street in South Los Angeles following a tip-off. There were no arrests, and a police spokesman later said there was no evidence of violence. Footage from the police raid was included in the final video.

According to YG, the US Secret Service attempted to halt the album's release because of the lyrical content of this song, but were unsuccessful, though a portion of the track was "blanked" before release. YG considered dropping the track from the album, worrying it would not be released, but was persuaded by producer Steve-O Carless to keep it. The track as released has gaps where controversial lines were removed.

The track contains a sample of "Somethin' To Ride To (Fonky Expedition)" by The Conscious Daughters.

== Reception ==
The track became increasingly popular throughout 2016. YG called his summer tour to promote Still Brazy the "Fuck Donald Trump Tour" and the song was remixed by G-Eazy and Macklemore, featuring new verses criticizing Trump's comments on banning Muslims from the US. Following the election, which saw Trump become president-elect, YG performed the song as the closing number in his set at the 2016 Camp Flog Gnaw Carnival to a positive reception.

The Los Angeles Times described "FDT" as, "the most prophetic, wrathful and unifying protest song of 2016."

In early 2019, YG announced he planned to record another Trump-related diss song as a follow-up.

In October 2020, a 44-year-old Texas man was filmed punching an anti-Trump protester who was playing the "FDT" song outside of a convenience store in Denton, Texas. The man who threw the punch was arrested.

On November 7, 2020, the song topped the iTunes charts after Joe Biden defeated Trump in the 2020 United States presidential election.

== "FDT Part 2" ==
"FDT Part 2"

Single by YG featuring G Eazy and Macklemore
- Released: August 16, 2016
- Recorded: 2016
- Genre: Political hip-hop
- Length: 3:42
- Label: 400; CTE; Def Jam
- Songwriters: Keenon Jackson; Benjamin Haggerty; Gerald Gillum
- Producer: DJ Swish

On August 16, 2016, YG released "FDT Part 2", a sequel to "FDT" featuring G Eazy and Macklemore.

== Charts ==
Chart (2016)	Peak position
US Bubbling Under Hot 100 (Billboard)	10
US Hot R&B/Hip-Hop Songs (Billboard)	50

== Certifications ==
Region	Certification	Certified units/sales
United States (RIAA)	Gold	500,000^{‡}
^{‡} Sales+streaming figures based on certification alone.

== See also ==
- Donald Trump in music
- Let's Go Brandon (song)
