= Hyphy =

San Francisco Bay Area slang meaning "hyperactive"

- Stylistic origins: West Coast hip hop; bounce; crunk; G-funk; mobb
- Cultural origins: Late 1990s, Oakland, California, U.S.
- Derivative forms: Trap (hip hop); trap (EDM)

Subgenres
- Jerkin'; Ratchet music

Fusion genres
- RnBass; wonky

The term hyphy (/ˈhaɪfi/ HY-fee) is an Oakland, California, slang meaning "hyperactive". More specifically, it is an adjective describing the hip-hop music and the culture associated with the Oakland area. The term was coined by rapper Keak da Sneak.

== History ==
The hyphy culture emerged in the late 1990s in Oakland before rising to prominence throughout the wider Bay Area in the early 2000s. It is distinguished by gritty, pounding rhythms, and has been compared to crunk music. San Jose producer Traxamillion is largely considered the first producer to create hyphy style music, having produced songs such as Keak Da Sneak's "Super Hyphy", which established the term hyphy. An individual is said to "get hyphy" when they dance in an overstated, fast-paced and ridiculous manner, or if they get overly loud with other people. The phrase "to get hyphy" is similar to the southern phrase "to get crunk". Those who consider themselves part of the hyphy movement strive for this behavior.

Although the Hyphy Movement briefly saw light in mainstream America, it has been an established subculture in the Bay Area since the early 1990s. Throughout the Bay Area (particularly in East Oakland), there are events regularly hosted called "sideshows", where people perform or watch illegal automobile performances. These performances include activities such as donuts, ghost-riding (an action that has proven fatal on multiple occasions) and street racing, while others dance and "go dumb" around them. The Hyphy Movement's resurgence in early 2006 was cited by prominent Bay Area rapper E-40 as a new opportunity for the Bay Area's unique sound to reach a nationwide audience. Hyphy music was not only popular in The Bay Area, but in Portland, Oregon, Seattle, and Reno as well.

For many Bay Area natives, rapper Mac Dre is cited as the individual who spearheaded the general public's interest in Hyphy music after his sudden death in 2004. Mac Dre's Treal TV DVD special represented everything Hyphy, from what goes on at the sideshows to street slang, and common dances like "going dumb" and the "thizzle dance" became popular moves created by Mac Dre. Many artists, such as Drake and DJ Mustard, pay homage to Mac Dre due to his huge influence in their musical career. With the start of Mac Dre's label, Thizz Entertainment, he was able to shine a light on local talent such as E-40 and Andre Nickatina, prominent members of the Bay Area rap scene.

== Post-hyphy ==
=== Jerkin' ===
Jerkin' or Jerk is a street dance and accompanying musical style derived from hyphy originating from and popularized by the Inland Empire-based groups New Boyz and Audio Push, and has origins in the Inland Empire and Los Angeles. Since 2009, jerkin' gained fans along the West Coast and, as of 2009, was gaining popularity in the East Coast.

=== Resurgence in the 2010s ===
In the early to mid-2010s, the genre of hyphy music saw a resurgence in the mainstream as a part of being a stylistic influence to an up tempo and club oriented type of mainstream hip hop known as "ratchet music," which was popularized by various Los Angeles producers, including DJ Mustard. The production style of DJ Mustard is adapted from hyphy music and played a role in bringing West Coast hip hop back to national attention. DJ Mustard has been attached in producing for popular artists' singles, which include: Tyga's, "Rack City," 2 Chainz's "I'm Different," Young Jeezy's "R.I.P.," B.o.B's "HeadBand," YG's "My Nigga" and "Who Do You Love?" (as well as the majority of his 2014 debut album My Krazy Life), Ty Dolla Sign's "Paranoid," Kid Ink's "Show Me," Trey Songz's "Na Na," Omarion's "Post to Be," and Big Sean's "I Don't Fuck With You," among others.

Among the local, more peripheral acts that achieved success outside of the Bay Area include Lil B, a member of the Berkeley rap group The Pack that has built a strong cult following on the Internet; the Richmond-based hip hop collective HBK Gang with individual members Iamsu!, Kehlani, Sage the Gemini, and P-Lo making their marks in the mainstream; Oakland-born pop rapper G-Eazy, who has gained two Billboard Top-10 hits with "Me, Myself & I" and "No Limit" (the latter featuring ASAP Rocky and Cardi B); and the Vallejo-based quartet SOB x RBE, who found mainstream attention after being featured on the track "Paramedic!" in the Kendrick Lamar-curated soundtrack album for the 2018 superhero film Black Panther.

In November 2011, Canadian hip hop artist Drake released the song "The Motto," featuring Young Money labelmate Lil Wayne, as the fourth single for his sophomore album Take Care. The song's instrumental (produced by T-Minus) takes major influence from hyphy music, and was a commercial success in the US—having sold 3,113,000 copies in the US as of April 2013—due to the meteoric popularity of the catchphrase YOLO during that time. It peaked atop both the US Hot R&B/Hip-Hop Songs and US Rap Songs charts, and was ranked 20 on the Billboard Hot 100 Year-end Chart. "The Motto" was also nominated for Best Rap Song at the 55th Grammy Awards. A music video was released on February 10, 2012, and features cameos from Bay Area rappers E-40 and Mistah F.A.B. as well as including an introduction from the mother of Mac Dre, Wanda Salvatto. Salvatto has also said, in a 2016 interview with Complex Media, that Drake told her how Mac Dre influenced him when he was 15 years old, and how important that was to him.

=== Continuing Interest in the 2020s ===
In March 2022 a music documentary about the Hyphy movement We Were Hyphy, by Bay Area documentary filmmaker, Laurence Madrigal, was released. It featured many of the well-known artists of the Hyphy movement, including Keak da Sneak, Mistah F.A.B and Rick Rock. It also featured contemporaneous musicians, including G-Eazy, Kamaiyah and P-Lo. As of recent, Oakland dance group known as "Turf Feinz" were featured in Kendrick Lamar's music video "squabble up" and was a part of the Kendrick Lamar halftime Super Bowl show in New Orleans 2025.

=== Rise of R&Bass ===
DJ Mustard's popularity around the same time began another movement that stemmed from the Bay Area, known as R&Bass. Coined by producer J Maine, this movement has gained widespread popularity, specifically on the Internet. R&Bass blends hyphy music with contemporary R&B, thus garnering crossover appeal. Artists like Jonn Hart, Rayven Justice, and producers like Christopher Dotson embrace the R&Bass style. As well, through this movement, there have been numerous collaborations with various hyphy artists, including E-40.

== Influence on electronic and pop music ==
As a result of the recognizably and commonality between many of DJ Mustard's chart-topping singles, a number of artists who employ production similar to his have been criticized for unoriginality and sometimes plagiarism, with some of the biggest offenders of this style rip-off including the 2014 chart-topping Iggy Azalea single, "Fancy" and "Classic Man," the 2015 debut single by rapper Jidenna which samples "Fancy". However, the popularity of Mustard's style started to gain influence outside of hip hop. In 2012, electronic dance music (EDM), which incorporated elements of southern trap music, began gaining popularity and brought wider attention to the derivative forms of trap, including hyphy, as well as Jamaican Dancehall music. This so-called "EDM Trap" genre saw the use of techno, dub, and house sounds combined with the Roland TR-808 drum samples and vocal samples typical of trap.

In December 2013, French producer DJ Snake and American rapper Lil Jon released the single "Turn Down for What", which became both a commercial hit charting in several countries and a viral hit throughout 2014. The composition of the song borrows elements from crunk and hyphy songs, and Rolling Stone voted "Turn Down For What" as the second best song of 2014, saying that, "The year's nutsiest party jam was also the perfect protest banger for a generation fed up with everything. DJ Snake brings the synapse-rattling EDM and Southern trap music; Lil Jon brings the dragon-fire holler for a hilarious, glorious, glowstick-punk fuck you."

The success of "Turn Down for What" set the standard for Trap EDM and even Pop music in the mid-2010s, which kept the influence and legacy of hyphy music alive. Among those songs include the DJ Snake and Major Lazer collaboration "Lean On," the Skrillex-produced Justin Bieber single "Sorry," and the chart-topping 2016 song "Closer" by American DJ duo The Chainsmokers.

== See also ==
- Ghost riding
- Tell Me When to Go
- Blow the Whistle
- ADHD
