= Blame It On the Streets =

2014 soundtrack album and short film by YG

Soundtrack album by YG
- Released: December 15, 2014
- Recorded: 2014
- Genre: West Coast hip hop; gangsta rap
- Length: 28:19
- Label: Pu$haz Ink; CTE; Def Jam
- Producer: YG (exec.); Young Jeezy (exec.); DJ Mustard; Sickamore (exec.); RJ; Kreep; Terrace Martin; Mike Free; The Neighbourhood; DJ Swish

YG chronology
My Krazy Life (2014)	Blame It On the Streets (2014)	Still Brazy (2016)

Blame It On the Streets is the name to both a short film and its soundtrack album by American hip hop recording artist YG. It was released on December 15, 2014, by Def Jam Recordings, his Pu$haz Ink label, along with Jeezy's CTE World label. The album features guest appearances from Big Wy, Jay 305, RJ, Nipsey Hussle, The Neighbourhood, TeeCee4800, Charley Hood, Slim 400, D-Lo, Mack 10 and DJ Quik. The film was attached to digital copies for the soundtrack, and is now available for streaming on Netflix.

== Background ==
The film highlights YG's life on the streets of Compton before his rise to fame. Co-written by YG with the help of Darryl "Lucky" Rodgers, Blame It On the Streets draws inspiration from two of the rapper's album cuts: "BPT", a song about YG's initiation into the infamous Pirus gang, and "Meet the Flockers", which describes his experience as a house burglar; YG said, "It's a group of your homies, so it's a flock of y'all going out lurking, looking for some shit to rob. That's why we call it flocking. I'm basically showing you the life behind those songs."

== Commercial performance ==
Professional ratings
Review scores
Source	Rating
The Early Registration	8.3/10
HipHopDX	4/5 stars
AllMusic	3.5/5 stars

The album debuted at number 118 on the US Billboard 200 chart, selling 17,000 copies in the first week. The album has sold 90,000 copies in the United States as of June 2016.

== Track listing ==
No.	Title	Producer(s)	Length
1.	"BPT (Live in the Bay)"	DJ Mustard	3:25
2.	"Bicken Back Being Bool (Remix)" (featuring Big Wy, Mack 10 and DJ Quik)	DJ Mustard	3:22
3.	"Blame It On the Streets" (featuring Jay 305)	Mike Free	3:19
4.	"Ride with Me" (featuring RJ and Nipsey Hussle)	DJ Mustard; DJ Swish	3:49
5.	"Me & My Bitch (Remix)" (cover performed by The Neighbourhood)	The Neighbourhood	3:38
6.	"If I Ever" (featuring TeeCee4800 and Charley Hood)	Mike Free; Terrace Martin	3:42
7.	"G$FB" (featuring Slim400, RJ and D-Lo)	Kreep	3:20
8.	"O.M.M.I.O. Freestyle" (performed by RJ)	DJ Mustard	1:27
9.	"2015 Flow"	DJ Mustard	2:17

- Executive Producer: YG, Sickamore, DJ Mustard
- Co- Executive Producer: Jeezy

CTE Music President: Steven "Steve-O" Carless

== Charts ==
Chart (2014)	Peak position
US Billboard 200	118
US Top R&B/Hip-Hop Albums (Billboard)	10
