= Lil Baby (disambiguation) =

Lil Baby (born 1994), is an American rapper.

Lil Baby may also refer to:

- "Lil Baby", by Mustard from Cold Summer, 2016
- "Lil Baby", by Young Thug from So Much Fun, 2019
