= Mike Free =

American musical artist (born 1992)

- Also known as: Mike Free
- Born: Mikely Wilhelm Adam; January 8, 1992 (age 34); Los Angeles, California, U.S.
- Origin: South Central, Los Angeles, U.S.
- Genre: West Coast hip-hop
- Occupations: Record producer; disc jockey; songwriter
- Instruments: Vocals; synergies; keyboards; drum machine
- Years active: 2011–present

Mikely Wilhelm Adam (born January 8, 1992), better known by his stage name Mike Free, is an American record producer, DJ, and songwriter from South Central, Los Angeles. While attending Hampton University in Virginia, Free began working with DJ Mustard, who introduced him to Los Angeles-based rappers YG and Ty Dolla Sign. Free's breakthrough in the music industry came from his co-production of Tyga's 2011 song "Rack City", which received quintuple platinum certification by the Recording Industry Association of America (RIAA).

== Singles Produced ==
List of singles produced, with selected chart positions and certifications, showing year released and album name
Title	Year	Peak chart positions								Certifications	Album
Title	Year	US	US R&B/Hip Hop	US Rap	AUS	CAN	FRA	GER	UK	Certifications	Album
"Rack City" (Tyga)	2011	7	1	2	56	53	150	60	39	RIAA: 5× Platinum; ARIA: Gold; BVMI: Gold	Careless World: Rise of the Last King
"Headband" (B.o.B. featuring 2 Chainz)	2013	53	16	15	—	67	—	—	—	RIAA: 4× Platinum	Underground Luxury
"Helluva Night" (Ludacris)	2013	96	31	23	—	—	—	—	—		#IDGAF
"My Nigga" (YG featuring Jeezy & Rich Homie Quan)	2013	19	5	4	69	62	106	—	53	RIAA: 5× Platinum	My Krazy Life
"Paranoid" (Ty Dolla Sign featuring B.o.B.)	2013	29	9	—	—	—	—	—	—	RIAA: 2× Platinum; MC: Gold	Beach House EP
"Show Me" (Kid Ink featuring Chris Brown)	2013	13	4	3	46	21	58	36	23	RIAA: 4× Platinum; ARIA: Platinum; BVMI: Gold	My Own Lane
"Up Down (Do This All Day)" (T-Pain featuring B.o.B.)	2013	62	15	—	—	—	—	—	43	RIAA: Platinum	T-Pain Presents Happy Hour: The Greatest Hits
"Feelin' Myself" (Will.i.am featuring French Montana, Miley Cyrus, Wiz Khalifa and DJ Mustard)	2013	96	29	18	34	—	50	55	2		#willpower
"Na Na" (Trey Songz)	2014	21	5	5	83	94	21	—	20	RIAA: 2× Platinum	Trigga
"Or Nah" (Ty Dolla Sign featuring Wiz Khalifa and DJ Mustard)	2014	48	12	—	—	78	—	—	—	RIAA: 10× Platinum; MC: 2× Platinum; BPI: Silver	Beach House EP
"24 Hours" (TeeFlii featuring 2 Chainz)	2014	85	21	15	—	—	—	6	—		Starr
"No Mediocre" (T.I. featuring Iggy Azalea)	2014	33	8	6	36	59	35	1	49	RIAA: Platinum; MC: Gold; ARIA: Gold	Paperwork
"You and Your Friends" (Wiz Khalifa featuring Snoop Dogg and Ty Dolla Sign)	2014	82	21	18	14	—	—	3	—	RIAA: Platinum	Blacc Hollywood
"Don't Panic" (French Montana)	2014	—	37	—	—	—	—	—	—		
"My Main" (Mila J featuring Ty Dolla Sign)	2014	—	—	—	—	—	—	—	—		M.I.L.A.
"I Don't Fuck With You" (Big Sean featuring E-40)	2014	11	1	1	47	35	138	95	67	RIAA: 9× Platinum; ARIA: Gold; BPI: Gold	Dark Sky Paradise
"Party Ain't A Party" (Jamie Foxx featuring 2 Chainz)	2014	—	—	—	—	—	—	—	—		
"Post to Be" (Omarion featuring Chris Brown & Jhené Aiko)	2014	13	5	—	79	49	—	—	74	RIAA: 6× Platinum; BPI: Gold	Sex Playlist
"It Ain't You" (Jordin Sparks)	2014	—	—	—	—	—	—	—	—		Right Here, Right Now
"I'm Tha Man" (Cozz)	2015	—	—	—	—	—	—	—	—		Cozz & Effect
"Only Right" (Ty Dolla Sign featuring YG, TeeCee 4800 and Joe Moses)	2015	—	—	—	—	—	—	—	—		Free TC
"The Fix" (Nelly)	2015	62	20	—	3	88	—	—	82	RIAA: Platinum; ARIA: 2× Platinum; RMNZ: Gold	
"All On You" (Raven Felix featuring Wiz Khalifa)	2016	—	—	—	—	—	—	—	—		
"Strive" (ASAP Ferg featuring Missy Elliott)	2016	—	—	—	—	—	—	—	—		Always Strive and Prosper
"League of Your Own" (DJ Spinking featuring French Montana, Nico & Vinz, and Velous)	2016	—	—	—	—	—	—	—	—		
"I Do This" (Nipsey Hussle featuring Young Thug and Mozzy)	2016	—	—	—	—	—	—	—	—		Slauson Boy 2
"Craccin" (G Perico)	2016	—	—	—	—	—	—	—	—		Shit Don't Stop
"Swap Meet" (Tyga)	2018	—	—	—	—	—	—	—	—		
"Bae" (O.T. Genasis)	2018	—	—	—	—	—	—	—	—		
"Big League" (O.T. Genasis)	2021	—	—	—	—	—	—	—	—		
"What Is Your Name" (O.T. Genasis)	2021	—	—	—	—	—	—	—	—		
"Been Thru" (HeyDeon)	2022	—	—	—	—	—	—	—	—		Snoop Dogg Presents Algorithm
"Pourin'" (03 Greedo featuring BlueBucksClan)	2022	—	—	—	—	—	—	—	—		Free 03
"Drop Down'" (03 Greedo featuring KenTheMan)	2022	—	—	—	—	—	—	—	—		Free 03
"Strike a Pose" (Coyote featuring Young Drummer Boy)	2025	—	—	—	—	—	—	—	—		
"Mood'" (Cuzzos)	2025	—	—	—	—	—	—	—	—		

== Other Production ==
=== 2013 ===
- Nipsey Hussle – Crenshaw
  - 02. "U See Us"
- R. Kelly – Black Panties
  - 11. "Spend That" (featuring Young Jeezy)

=== 2014 ===
- YG – My Krazy Life
  - 06. "Meet the Flockers" (featuring Tee Cee)
  - 17. "My Nigga (Remix)" (featuring Lil Wayne, Nicki Minaj, Meek Mill and Rich Homie Quan)
- DJ Mustard – 10 Summers
  - 05. "Giuseppe" (featuring 2 Chainz, Young Jeezy and Yo Gotti)
  - 07. "Down On Me" (featuring 2 Chainz and Ty Dolla Sign)
  - 13. "Vato" (featuring Que, YG, and Jeezy)
- E-40 – Sharp On All 4 Corners: Corner 1
  - 03. "Money Sack" (featuring Boosie Badazz)
  - 07. "Three Jobs"
- E-40 – Sharp On All 4 Corners: Corner 2
  - 01. "It's The First" (featuring Cousin Fik & Turk Talk)
  - 02. "That's Right" (featuring Ty Dolla Sign)
- YG – Blame It On the Streets
  - 03. "Blame It On The Streets" (featuring Jay 305)
  - 06. "If I Ever" (featuring TeeCee4800 & Charley Hood)
- Kid Ink
  - "Show Me (Remix)" (featuring Trey Songz, Juicy J, 2 Chainz & Chris Brown)

=== 2015 ===
- Chris Brown & Tyga – Fan of a Fan: The Album
  - 02. "Nothin' Like Me" (featuring Ty Dolla Sign)
  - 16. "Banjo"
- Jamie Foxx – Hollywood: A Story of a Dozen Rose
  - 17. "Pretty Thing"

=== 2016 ===
- E-40 – The D-Boy Diary: Book 1
  - 10. "Stay Away" (featuring Eric Bellinger)
- Dom Kennedy – Los Angeles Is Not For Sale, Vol. 1
  - 13. "U Got It Like That" (featuring Niko G4)
  - 14. "Johnny Bench"

=== 2017 ===
- Problem – Chachiville
  - 13. "All Year"
- Jay 305 – Taking All Bets
  - 09. "Why You So Nasty?" (featuring Travis Scott)

=== 2018 ===
- Rich The Kid – The World Is Yours
  - 03. "No Question" (featuring Future)
- Lil Wayne – Tha Carter V
  - 16. "Open Safe"
- Problem – S2
  - 02. "Put It Down" (featuring 03 Greedo)
- Salma Slims
  - "Nobody"
- Drakeo The Ruler – Cold Devil
  - 7. "Bullet Proof" (featuring Bambino)

=== 2020 ===
- Eric Bellinger & Nieman J – Optimal Music
  - 03. "Alone" (featuring Blxst)

=== 2021 ===
- Philthy Rich – Phillip Beasley
  - 09. "Too Bad" (featuring Jim Jones & Landstrip Chip)
