= 10 Summers =

Studio album by DJ Mustard
- Released: August 11, 2014
- Recorded: 2014
- Genres: Hip hop; R&B
- Length: 39:20
- Labels: Pu$haz Ink; Roc Nation; Republic
- Producers: Corporal; Deputy; DJ Mustard; Mike Free; Shomari Wilson; TeeFlii

DJ Mustard chronology
10 Summers (2014)	Cold Summer (2016)

Singles from 10 Summers
- 1. "Down on Me" Released: May 13, 2014

10 Summers is the debut studio album by American music producer DJ Mustard. It was released on August 11, 2014, by Pu$haz Ink, Roc Nation and Republic Records. The album, produced entirely by DJ Mustard himself, features guest appearances from several American rappers, such as Big Sean, Fabolous, YG, Rick Ross, Ty Dolla $ign, Lil Wayne, 2 Chainz, Young Jeezy, Nipsey Hussle, Wiz Khalifa, Lil Boosie, Yo Gotti, Iamsu!, TeeFlii, and Dom Kennedy, among others.

== Release and promotion ==
On July 22, 2014, DJ Mustard unveiled the album's track list. On August 11, 2014, 10 Summers was released through Google Play for free during its first week.

== Critical reception ==
Professional ratings
Aggregate scores
Source	Rating
Metacritic	74/100
Review scores
Source	Rating
AllMusic	3.5/5 stars
AbsolutePunk	5.8/10
Complex	2.5/5 stars
Exclaim!	7/10
Pitchfork	7.7/10
Rolling Stone	3.5/5 stars
Tiny Mix Tapes	4/5 stars
XXL	(XL)
Wondering Sound	4/5 stars

10 Summers received generally positive reviews from music critics. At Metacritic, which assigns a normalized rating out of 100 to reviews from critics, the album received an average score of 74, which indicates "generally favorable reviews", based on 7 reviews.

== Track listing ==
- All tracks produced by DJ Mustard except where noted. Credits adapted from Spotify.

No.	Title	Writer(s)	Producer(s)	Length
1.	"Low Low" (featuring Nipsey Hussle, Tee Cee and RJ)	Dijon McFarlane; Ermias Asghedom; Marquise Newman; Mikely Adam; Rodney Brown	DJ Mustard; Mike Free	2:36
2.	"Ghetto Tales" (featuring Jay 305 and Tee Cee)	McFarlane; Jay Cummins; Newman; Adam	DJ Mustard; Mike Free	3:08
3.	"Throw Your Hood Up" (featuring Dom Kennedy, Choice and RJ)	McFarlane; Dominic Hunn; Brown	DJ Mustard	4:38
4.	"No Reason" (featuring YG, Young Jeezy, Nipsey Hussle and RJ)	McFarlane; Asghedom; Jay Jenkins; Jesse Wilson; Keenon Jackson; Adam; Brown	DJ Mustard; Mike Free; Corporal	3:31
5.	"Giuseppee" (featuring 2 Chainz, Young Jeezy and Yo Gotti)	McFarlane; Jenkins; Mario Giden; Tauheed Epps	DJ Mustard; Mike Free	3:50
6.	"Face Down" (featuring Lil Wayne, Big Sean, YG and Boosie Badazz)	McFarlane; Dwayne Carter; K. Jackson; Sean Anderson; Shomari Wilson; Torrence Hatch	DJ Mustard; Shomari Wilson	4:27
7.	"Down on Me" (featuring 2 Chainz and Ty Dolla $ign)	McFarlane; Epps; Tyrone Griffin Jr	DJ Mustard	4:04
8.	"Can’t Tell Me Shit" (featuring Iamsu! and AKAFrank)	McFarlane; Frank Stanley Naborne III; Adam; Sudan Williams	DJ Mustard; Mike Free	3:11
9.	"Tinashe Checks In (Interlude)"	McFarlane; Ely Weisfeld; Erica Hamilton; Jamil Pierre	DJ Mustard; Deputy	1:59
10.	"4 Digits" (featuring Fabolous and Eric Bellinger)	Christian Jones; McFarlane; Eric Bellinger; John Jackson; Omar Grant; Rod Bullock	DJ Mustard; TeeFlii	3:11
11.	"Ty Dolla $ign Checks In (Interlude)"	McFarlane	DJ Mustard	1:08
12.	"Deep" (featuring Rick Ross, Wiz Khalifa and TeeFlii)	McFarlane; William Roberts II; Cameron Thomaz; Adam; Jones	DJ Mustard; Mike Free	3:37
13.	"Vato" (featuring YG, Young Jeezy, and Que.)	McFarlane; Que Rossini; Jenkins; K. Jackson	DJ Mustard	4:12

Notes

- "Can’t Tell Me Shit" is known as "Can’t Tell Me" on streaming versions of the album.
- "Vato" is not included on streaming versions of the album.
- "Tinashe Checks In (Interlude)" features vocals by Tinashe.
- "Ty Dolla $ign Checks In (Interlude)" features vocals by Ty Dolla Sign.

Sample credits

- "No Reason" contains samples from "Act Right", written by Mario Mims, Jay Jenkins, Keenon Jackson, Osten Harvey Jr., Paulo Ytienza Rodriguez, Roger Troutman, and Christopher Wallace, and performed by Yo Gotti.
- "Tinashe Checks In (Interlude)" contains an interpolation from "Other Bitches", written by Tinashe Kachingwe, and performed by Tinashe.
- "Ty Dolla $ign Checks In (Interlude)" contains a sample from "Show Me", written by Brian Collins, Christian Jones, Chris Brown, and Jeremih Felton, and performed by Kid Ink; and a sample from "My Nigga", written by Keenon Jackson, Dijon McFarlane, Mikely Adam, Daniel Wall, Jay Jenkins, Dequantes Lamar, Calvin Broadus, Awood Johnson, Craig Lawson, and Corey Miller, and performed by YG.

== Charts ==
Chart (2014)	Peak position
US Billboard 200	143
US Top R&B/Hip-Hop Albums (Billboard)	20
