= 10,000 Hours (disambiguation) =

"10,000 Hours" is a 2019 song by Dan + Shay and Justin Bieber.

"10,000 Hours" may also refer to:

== Music ==
- "Ten Thousand Hours", a 2012 song by Macklemore & Ryan Lewis from the album The Heist
- "10,000 Hours", a 2016 song by DJ Mustard from the album Cold Summer
- "10,000 Hours", a 2017 single by Ella Mai from the EP Change
- "10,000 Hours", a 2018 song by PrettyMuch from the EP PrettyMuch an EP
- "10k Hours", a 2020 song by Jhené Aiko featuring Nas from the album Chilombo

== Other ==
- 10,000 Hours (film), a 2013 Filipino action film
- 10,000 hour rule, a formula for success popularized in the 2008 book Outliers by Malcolm Gladwell
