= Omar Grant =

American music executive

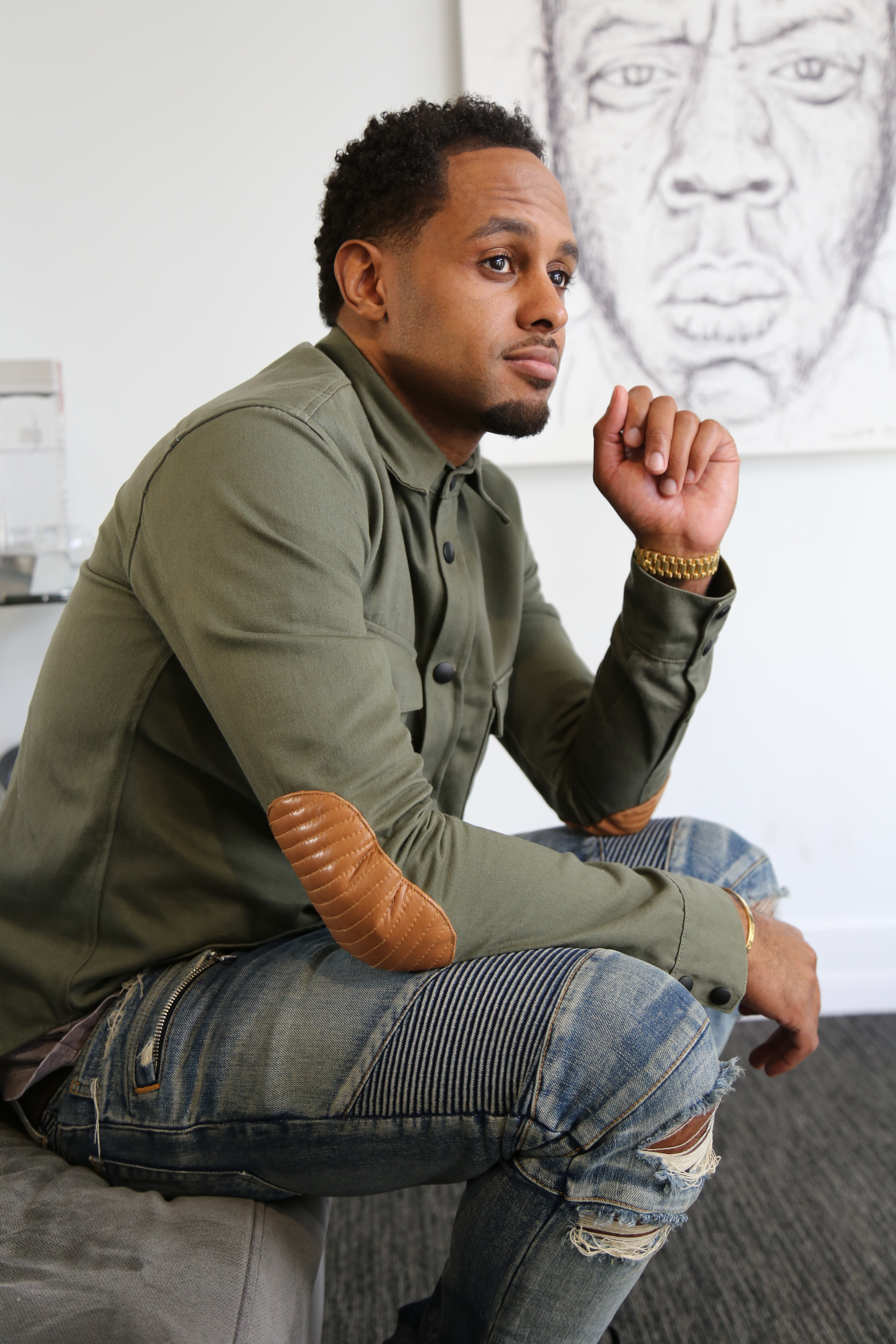
- Grant in 2019

Background information
- Genres: Hip hop, R&B, pop
- Occupation: Record executive
- Years active: 2003–present
- Label: Roc Nation

Omar Grant is an American record executive. Grant has worked in A&R for EMI Group Limited, Epic Records and Roc Nation.

In his A&R career, Grant worked with artists including Kelly Rowland, Rihanna, DJ Mustard, Kylie Minogue and others, each of whom have sold over of 100 million copies in album-equivalent units.

== Early life and education ==
Grant was born and grew up in the neighborhood of Soundview, in the southern section of the Bronx. Grant is a 2003 graduate of Adelphi University.

== Career ==
After graduating college, Grant took his first job as an assistant tour manager to Destiny's Child and then as tour manager for each of the three members individually including Kelly Rowland, Michelle Williams and Beyoncé. In 2006, Grant became Creative Director of Urban A&R for EMI followed by Senior Director of A&R at Epic Records and A&R at Roc Nation.

Grant in 2010–11 was the A&R for Kelly Rowland's album "Here I Am", that featured the hit Single "Motivation" which went #1 for eight weeks on the Urban Hip Hop Charts. The album also had the hit record "Lay It On Me" featuring Big Sean. The album was Rowland's highest selling album to date.

In 2011, Grant joined Roc Nation as an A&R, Grant became the A&R on Rihanna's album "Unapologetic" The album was Rihanna's first #1 debut album, with first-week sales of 238,000. Worldwide sales of more than 4,000,000 to date. The album featured the hit singles "Diamonds", "Pour it Up" and "Stay", "Loveeeeeee song" and "What Now" . The Album won a Grammy Award for Best Urban Contemporary Album at the 2014 Ceremony.

In 2013, Grant signed hit-maker producer/artist and DJ, DJ Mustard, to Roc Nation for Management and as a recording artist on the label. Mustard was awarded BMI Producer and Songwriter of the Year in 2015 BMI Awards, the only person to win both awards in the same year. In August 2014, DJ Mustard released his debut Album "10 Summers" which Grant was the A&R. The album featured songs such as "Down on me", "4 Digits" and "Face Down" featuring Lil Wayne, Big Sean, YG and Boosie Badazz. The album was released on Google Play the first week and was the most downloaded album on Google play that summer.

In 2015, Grant worked as an A&R on the soundtrack for the DreamWorks animated film entitled Home.

DJ Mustard's follow up release was Cold Summer released on September 16, 2016, by Pu$haz Ink, Roc Nation and Republic Records mostly produced by DJ Mustard himself, and with the help of Omar Grant Mustard had feature guest appearances from YG, Ty Dolla $ign, Nipsey Hussle, RJ, Quavo, O.T. Genasis, Jeezy, Rich The Kid, TeeCee4800, K Camp, Nicki Minaj, Jeremih, Young Thug, Meek Mill, Ella Mai, Rick Ross, John Legend and James Fauntleroy.

"Don't Hurt Me", lead single, featuring guest appearances from Nicki Minaj and Jeremiah and produced by DJ Mustard and Twice as Nice was released on July 1, 2016.

"Want Her" was released on February 28, 2017, as the album's second single. The song features guest appearances from YG and Quavo.

Grant also was the A&R on the Kylie Minogue album Kiss Me Once, which was the twelfth studio album by the Australian recording Artist, the album met with positive reviews from music critic, many whom complimented Minogue's return to the mainstream.

Grant was A&R for Home (OST) by Rihanna and various, a 2015 animation film based on the 2007 children book The True Meaning of Smekday by Adam Rex released on March 23, 2015, by Westbury Road and Roc Nation, Artists featured include Clarence Coffee Jr., Kiesza, Charli XCX, Jacob Plant, and Jennifer Lopez.

Grant was the A&R on Rihanna's eighth studio album Anti, released on January 28, 2016, Anti topped the chart with 166,000 equivalent album units, 124,000 of which were sales, Rihanna's second number one album. Subsequently, it also debuted at number one on the US R&B/Hip-Hop Albums chart. Being involved in finding and developing all the songs on the album, Grant was responsible for Party Next Door to write the hit single "Work" and organized Drake to lend vocals on the feature. The song reached Number 1 on the Hot 100 for eight consecutive weeks.

Grant's involvement as A&R for Big Sean led to his second number one album, with I Decided debuting at the top at the Billboard 200 chart. It earned 151,000 equivalent album units in the week of February 9, according to Nielsen Music. 65,000 of the number were in pure album sales. As of April 18, 2017, I Decided was certified gold.
