= Meet the Flockers =

2014 song by YG featuring Tee Cee

Song by YG featuring Tee Cee

from the album My Krazy Life
- Released: March 18, 2014
- Genre: West Coast hip-hop; gangsta rap
- Length: 2:03
- Label: CTE; Pushaz Ink; Def Jam
- Songwriters: Keenon Jackson; Marquise Newman; Mikely Adam; Dijon McFarlane
- Producer: Mike Free

"Meet the Flockers" is a song by American rapper YG from his debut studio album My Krazy Life (2014). It features American rapper Tee Cee and was produced by Mike Free. The song was widely accused of racism against Asian Americans, especially Chinese Americans, due to its lyrics about targeting Chinese American communities for robbery.

== Background ==
In an April 2014 interview with Fuse, YG described the song's theme of breaking into and robbing houses as representative of the culture that he grew up in. He said he wanted to share the experience through the song and that it was also his favorite song on My Krazy Life.

== Composition and lyrics ==
The song finds YG detailing a home invasion and robbery through step-by-step instructions, in a style that has been compared to "Ten Crack Commandments" by The Notorious B.I.G.: "First, you find a house and scope it out / Find a Chinese neighborhood, 'cause they don't believe in bank accounts / Second, you find a crew and a driver, someone to ring the doorbell / And someone that ain't scared to do what it do / Third, you pull up at the spot / Park, watch, ring the doorbell and knock / Four, make sure nobody's home / They gone, okay it's on". During the chorus, he raps "Meet the motherfucking flockers / Make some noise if you've ever stole something in your life"; "flocking" is slang for burglarizing a home. YG also uses synthetic vocals, via talk box or vocoder effects. At the end of the song, Tee Cee quotes a line from "My Nigga", the next track on My Krazy Life, setting up the transition into that song.

== Controversy ==
"Meet the Flockers" drew little attention when it was first released, but surfaced on Chinese social media apps WeChat and Weibo shortly after a surveillance video of Chinese American woman Fengzhu Chen fending off burglars with a handgun went viral; the incident had happened in Atlanta on September 16, 2016. This sparked wide outrage, leading to protests against the song by Chinese Americans across the country, many of them taking place outside YG's concerts. Chinese Americans, as well as social network users in China, condemned the song for glorifying and encouraging crime and violence against Asian Americans, particularly Chinese Americans. Although some people dismissed the song as freedom of expression, Lynette Gibson McElhaney, a member of the Oakland City Council, disagreed with this sentiment, saying "Even if you are coming up from a life of crime, you don't want to glorify it. You want to talk about ways to eradicate it." In late September, San Francisco Supervisor Jane Kim petitioned YouTube to delete an unofficial music video for the song, which was produced without YG's involvement and shows two armed men, with bandanas partially covering their faces, breaking into a house as the camera pans over to a framed photo of an Asian family of four; the request was granted. Similarly, the chairman of the Chinese American Bar Association asked United States Department of Justice Civil Rights Division to take action "to prevent Chinese Americans from victimization" by the song and video. Cliff Li, an IT worker serving on the National Committee of Asian American Republicans, started a group called the New Civil Rights Alliance with others. The group organized protests at YG's shows, picketing them until the end of his tour, aiming to hold people "culturally responsible" for violent content. Li believed that YG did not hate Chinese people or intend to incite violence, but "when you view Asian Americans as poor, weak, pathetic people that you can kick around for fun, that is not fair. Our community has this stereotype and we have to fight it or we're going to continue to suffer that stereotype." Neither YG nor his booking agents and managers publicly responded to requests for comment; when confronted by protesters at his concert in Washington, D.C., he simply replied with "Protest that."

A petition to the White House was created on September 21, 2016, with an appeal to "ban the song from public media and investigate legal responsibilities of the writer". It garnered over 100,000 signatures within a month, requiring the White House to review it and issue an official response within 60 days. The Obama administration refused to ban the song or criticize the lyrics, on the grounds that it was protected under the First Amendment. While Asian American leaders affirmed support for freedom of speech, many were indignant at the decision.

In 2017, the Los Angeles Police Department attributed the song to a major spike in knock-knock burglaries throughout the San Fernando Valley. Three men, ages 18 and 19, who were arrested after burglarizing three homes in their own North Hollywood neighborhood on April 27, 2017, told LAPD detectives that they were inspired by the song.

In 2021, amid the rise in anti-Asian hate crimes during the COVID-19 pandemic, some YouTube employees asked the company's Trust & Safety team to remove the song from the platform. An executive from the department and another content policy leader denied the request; in an email to staff on March 22, 2021, they wrote "We find this video to be highly offensive and understand it is painful for many to watch, including many in Trust & Safety and especially given the ongoing violence against the Asian community." The executives stated that although the song violated YouTube's hate speech policy, exceptions were made for videos with an Educational, Documentary, Scientific or Artistic (EDSA) context, and expressed a concern about setting a precedent that may lead to the removal of more music from YouTube. However, the song was briefly removed from YouTube, Apple Music and Spotify and an updated version censoring the controversial lyrics was reuploaded to these platforms on April 5, 2021. The lyrics "find a Chinese neighborhood" were changed to "find a, find a neighborhood".

Some have defended the song as merely an autobiographical account of YG's past, rather than a call for violence against Chinese Americans. Rapper B.G. Knocc Out responded that YG was simply being truthful, adding that he personally knew people who broke into houses as depicted in the song, though he himself never participated. Chinese American rapper China Mac expressed a similar view; he believed the song was not racially motivated, though he deemed it irresponsible. Mac also admitted to robbing houses when he was a gang member, including Asian households, and felt that Asians were not necessarily targeted out of discrimination, but rather because they were perceived as affluent and assumed to keep cash in their homes.
