= Up Down (Do This All Day) =

Single by T-Pain featuring B.o.B

from the album T-Pain Presents Happy Hour: The Greatest Hits
- Released: August 13, 2013
- Recorded: 2013
- Genre: Hip hop
- Length: 3:51
- Label: Nappy Boy; Konvict Muzik; RCA
- Songwriters: Faheem Najm; Bobby Simmons; Dijon McFarlane; Mikely Adam; James Michael Cohen
- Producers: DJ Mustard; Mike Free

T-Pain singles chronology
| "Algo Me Gusta de Ti" (2012) | "Up Down (Do This All Day)" (2013) | "Drankin' Patna" (2014) |

B.o.B singles chronology
| "Brokenhearted" (2013) | "Up Down (Do It All Day)" (2013) | "Ready" (2013) |

Music video
- "Up Down (Do This All Day)" on YouTube

"Up Down (Do This All Day)" is a song by American singer and rapper T-Pain featuring fellow American rapper B.o.B, released on August 13, 2013, as the first single from the former's Greatest Hits/compilation album, T-Pain Presents Happy Hour: The Greatest Hits (2014). Produced by DJ Mustard and Mike Free, the song peaked at number 62 and 43 on the US Billboard Hot 100 and the UK Singles Chart respectively.

== Background ==
On August 13, 2013, T-Pain premiered "Up Down (Do This All Day)" (originally intended as the first single from his fifth studio album Stoicville: The Phoenix). The song featured production by DJ Mustard and a guest appearance from rapper B.o.B. It was then released to iTunes the same day. Mustard's production is bouncy and synth based, with heavy use of the Roland 808 drum machine.

In the song T-Pain professes his love for strippers and liquor. Rap-Up referred to the song as a strip club anthem. T-Pain spoke on the song saying, "You know I'm the strip club king. It just goes like that, man. Basically, I'm just making another one. This is regular shit for me. I'm just going in!"

== Recording ==
T-Pain told Artistdirect about the song's creation saying;

"It started with the beat. I was listening to the beat for about three days. Once I forced myself to do it, then I had it. It wasn't really a hard thing to do. I was just like, "Alright, I guess I'll do this one! Here we go!" You know, I've been working with B.o.B since before he got signed really. It's been a good time. It's been really collaborative with us. At the time, it wasn't the right songs or the right situation. Now, that I had something good so it was only right. I don't make people conform to what I'm doing when I got to get somebody. When you get T-Pain, you don't really want to tell T-Pain what to do. If you got in mind what you want T-Pain to do, you could've done it yourself. That's where B.o.B came from, and he enjoys strip clubs as much as I do. It was only right to get him."

== Live performances ==
On January 14, 2014, T-Pain performed "Up Down (Do This All Day)" on DJ Skee's SKEE Live. On January 16, 2014, T-Pain performed the song on The Arsenio Hall Show.

== Commercial performance ==
On May 14, 2015, Up Down was certified Platinum by the RIAA.

== Critical reception ==
Pitchfork called the song "a fantastic collaboration with B.o.B that appeared and disappeared just as quickly".

== Music video ==
On September 9, 2013, T-Pain released the lyric video to the song. As the song plays, a number of strippers show off their assets and their dance moves. As they dance the lyrics flash across the screen in "neon, fitting, form, giving off a club like feel." On November 19, 2013, T-Pain released the music video for "Up Down (Do This All Day)". The G Visuals-directed video follows the average ratchet backyard party. It has been described as paying homage to early 1990s hip hop videos. The video features a cameo appearance from Tyrese.

== Remix ==
On January 15, 2014, T-Pain previewed the remix via Instagram as he was working on it, it features a new instrumental by DJ Montay. The following day, T-Pain told Rap-Up that he wanted to get B.o.B, 2 Chainz, Snoop Dogg, Que, Jeezy, Rihanna and Andre 3000 featured on the remix. T-Pain revealed on May 12, 2014 that there would be three official remixes for the song. The first remix features rappers Lil Boosie and Kid Ink, along with T-Pain and B.o.B. It was then released on May 14, 2014.

== Chart performance ==
=== Weekly charts ===
| Chart (2013–14) | Peak position |
|---|---|
| Belgium (Ultratip Bubbling Under Flanders) | 50 |
| Belgium Urban (Ultratop Flanders) | 25 |
ERROR in "CIS": Invalid position: 258. Expected number 1–200 or dash (–).
| UK Hip Hop/R&B (Official Charts) | 7 |
| UK Singles (Official Charts) | 43 |
| US Billboard Hot 100 | 62 |
| US Hot R&B/Hip-Hop Songs (Billboard) | 15 |
| US Rhythmic Airplay (Billboard) | 24 |

| Chart (2025) | Peak position |
|---|---|
| Greece International (IFPI) | 79 |
| Sweden Heatseeker (Sverigetopplistan) | 16 |

=== Year-end charts ===
| Chart (2014) | Position |
|---|---|
| US Hot R&B/Hip-Hop Songs (Billboard) | 46 |

== Certifications ==
| Region | Certification | Certified units/sales |
|---|---|---|
| Denmark (IFPI Danmark) | Gold | 45,000^{‡} |
| New Zealand (RMNZ) | 3× Platinum | 90,000^{‡} |
| United Kingdom (BPI) | Silver | 200,000^{‡} |
| United States (RIAA) | Platinum | 1,000,000^{‡} |
^{‡} Sales+streaming figures based on certification alone.

== Release history ==
| Region | Date | Format | Label(s) |
|---|---|---|---|
| United States | August 13, 2013 | Digital download | Nappy Boy Entertainment, Konvict Muzik, RCA Records |
| United States | August 13, 2013 | Mainstream urban radio | Nappy Boy Entertainment, Konvict Muzik, RCA Records |
| United States | September 24, 2013 | Rhythmic contemporary radio | Nappy Boy Entertainment, Konvict Muzik, RCA Records |
