= Left, Right =

Single by YG featuring DJ Mustard

from the album My Krazy Life
- Released: December 10, 2013
- Recorded: 2013
- Genre: Dirty rap; ratchet
- Length: 3:54
- Label: Pu$haz Ink; CTE; Def Jam
- Songwriters: Keenon Jackson; Dijon McFarlane
- Producer: DJ Mustard

YG singles chronology
"My Nigga" (2013)	"Left, Right" (2013)	"Who Do You Love?" (2014)

DJ Mustard singles chronology
"Feelin' Myself" (2013)	"Left, Right" (2014)	"Or Nah" (2014)

"Left, Right" is a song by American rapper YG, released on December 10, 2013 as the second single from his debut studio album My Krazy Life (2014). The song was produced by and features vocals from frequent collaborator DJ Mustard. It received positive reviews from critics. "Left, Right" peaked at number 44 on the US Billboard Hot R&B/Hip-Hop Songs chart. A music video for the single, directed by Alex Nazari and YG, features a house party in Compton that's filled with cameos from Los Angeles rappers.

== Background ==
"Left, Right" was premiered on November 28, 2013 via Young Jeezy's #ItsThaWorld2 mixtape. It was official released for digital download on December 10, 2013 as the second single from his debut studio album My Krazy Life.

The song's production was constructed by YG's frequent collaborator DJ Mustard. It is based around a minimalistic three-note theme which doubles down with a fiddle midway through each verse.

== Critical reception ==
"Left, Right" was met with generally positive reviews from music critics. Jordan Sowunmi of Now called it a "hedonistic jam sprinkled with distinctive California cultural markers." Dorian Mendoza of PrettyMuchAmazing said the song "can make every club in the nation shake." Jesse Fairfax of HipHopDX said the song is "sure to please his flesh chasing peer group entering early adulthood." Jesal 'Jay Soul' Padania of RapReviews compared the song's sound to executive producer Young Jeezy's debut album Let's Get It: Thug Motivation 101. Michael Madden of Consequence of Sound stated that the song was very sex related, but engaging nonetheless.

== Music video ==
The majority of the music video for "Left, Right" was filmed on December 23, 2013 around Roscoe's House of Chicken and Waffles located on 5006 W Pico Blvd in Los Angeles and was directed by Alex Nazari and YG. A week later a teaser for the music video was released. Then on January 29, 2014, the music video was released for the song. In the video YG and DJ Mustard throw a block party in Compton, California. It is reminiscent of the Compton party scenes seen in the classic hip hop videos Dr. Dre's "Nuthin' but a 'G' Thang" and Snoop Dogg's "Gin and Juice". YG spends most of the video standing on the roof of Roscoe's similar to how Snoop did when he burst on to the scene with the "Who Am I? (What's My Name?)" music video." The video includes women twerking throughout and at one point an implied dog fight. Cameo appearances in the video come from rappers Young Jeezy, Nipsey Hussle and Dom Kennedy.

== Charts ==
Chart (2014)	Peak position
US Hot R&B/Hip-Hop Songs (Billboard)	44

== Certifications ==
Region	Certification	Certified units/sales
United States (RIAA)	Gold	500,000^{‡}
^{‡} Sales+streaming figures based on certification alone.
