= Who Do You Love? (YG song) =

Single by YG featuring Drake

from the album My Krazy Life
- Released: February 20, 2014
- Recorded: 2013
- Genre: West Coast hip-hop; hyphy
- Length: 3:54
- Label: Pu$haz Ink; CTE; Def Jam
- Songwriters: Keenon Jackson; Aubrey Graham; Dijon McFarlane; Anthony Forté; William Bell; Booker T. Jones
- Producer: DJ Mustard

YG singles chronology
"Left, Right" (2013)	"Who Do You Love?" (2014)	"nEXt" (2014)

Drake singles chronology
"Odio" (2014)	"Who Do You Love?" (2014)	"Trophies" (2014)

Music video
- "Who Do You Love?" on YouTube

"Who Do You Love?" is a song by American hip hop recording artist YG from his debut studio album My Krazy Life (2014). It was released on February 20, 2014, as the third single from the album. The song, produced by frequent collaborator DJ Mustard, features a guest appearance from Canadian rapper Drake. The song has since peaked at number 54 on the US Billboard Hot 100 chart.

== Background ==
YG has stated that the inspiration of the song came from a Lil Boosie song of the same name. The song was originally intended as the first single off of "My Krazy Life" but YG chose to go against the label due to him preferring to not rely on Drake for success. The song initially leaked New Year's Eve 2013 after a fan impersonating a DJ tricked YG into emailing him the song.

== Chart performance ==
"Who Do You Love?" debuted at number 78 on the US Billboard Hot 100, on the chart dated March 29, 2014. The following week on the chart, the song reached its peak position at 54 on the chart. On May 31, 2018, the single was certified double platinum by the Recording Industry Association of America (RIAA) for combined sales and streaming data units of over two million units in the United States.

== Controversy ==
On December 30, 2013, San Francisco rapper Rappin' 4-Tay wrote a tweet saying that Drake's verse on the song copied his verse from his 1994 single "Playaz Club".

In 2014, Drake was sued by Rappin' 4-Tay, claiming Drake misused his lyrics when collaborating with YG on the song. The West Coast rapper sought $100,000 for mistreatment and artistic theft, which Drake paid to the rapper later that year.

== Music video ==
A music video for "Who Do You Love?" was released via YG's VEVO channel on March 7, 2014. It was directed by Benny Boom.

== Charts ==
=== Weekly charts ===
Chart (2014)	Peak position
Belgium Urban (Ultratop Flanders)	16
France (SNEP)	197
Germany (Deutsche Black Charts)	12
UK Singles (The Official Charts Company)	87
UK Hip Hop/R&B (Official Charts)	16
US Billboard Hot 100	54
US Hot R&B/Hip-Hop Songs (Billboard)	15
US Rhythmic Airplay (Billboard)	5

=== Year-end charts ===
Chart (2014)	Position
US Hot R&B/Hip-Hop Songs (Billboard)	38
US Rhythmic (Billboard)	32

== Certifications ==
Region	Certification	Certified units/sales
United States (RIAA)	2× Platinum	2,000,000^{‡}
^{‡} Sales+streaming figures based on certification alone.
