= RJMrLA =

American rapper (born 1984)

- Also known as: RJ
- Born: Rodney Jerome Brown, Jr. September 24, 1984 (age 42); Los Angeles, California, U.S.
- Genres: West Coast hip-hop; gangsta rap
- Occupations: Rapper; songwriter
- Years active: 2012–present
- Labels: 400 Summers; OMMIO; Empire; 4Hunnid; Pushaz Ink; 10 Summers

Rodney Jerome Brown Jr. (born September 24, 1984), known professionally as RJMrLA (stylized as RJmrLA; or simply RJ), is an American rapper from Los Angeles, California. He is known for his frequent collaborations with fellow West Coast artists YG and Mustard, and was signed to their respective labels: 4Hunnid Records and 10 Summers Records.

== Career ==
=== 2013–present: O.M.M.I.O. series and collaborations ===
In 2013, RJMrLA released his debut mixtape O.M.M.I.O (which stands for On My Mama I'm On). The mixtape was hosted and largely produced by DJ Mustard. The first song from this mixtape, "Ride Wit Me" was included and released, as the single. RJMLrA then appeared on the songs; "Thank God (Interlude)" and "When I Was Gone" from YG's debut album, My Krazy Life (2014). In July 2014, RJrMLA released his second mixtape Takin Niggas Beats, featuring local rappers; Shoota300, JaywhiteT, and Vince Staples (on a contrary to his first mixtape). Unfortunately disagreements between them erupted, which led to RJMrLA dropping their names from the project entirely. The beats on this mixtape were solely from made-up beats from the other rappers that were remixed by RJMrLA. On the same year, DJ Mustard released his debut album 10 Summers, where RJMrLA appeared on the tracks; including "Low Low", "Throw Your Hood Up" and "No Reason".

At the beginning of 2015, RJMrLA collaborated with Choice to release a critically acclaimed mixtape, Rich Off Mackin. Additionally, RJMrLA appeared on the DJ Mustard's mixtape, titled Ketchup, as well as one of YG's mixtapes Just Re'd Up 2. On May 26, 2015, RJMrLA released a mixtape, O.M.M.I.O. 2, as the sequel to his debut mixtape O.M.M.I.O. The song "Get Rich" (with Choice featuring Iamsu!) was included and released as the lead single. Both of these singles; his 2013's single, "Ride Wit Me" and his 2015's single, "Get Rich", did not chart, both songs received radio airplay throughout the West Coast. He also contributed to the soundtrack for the NBA 2K16's video game by being featured in the original song "You Don't Want It" with frequent collaborator and 10 Summers Records founder DJ Mustard. On May 12, 2016, he released O.M.M.I.O 3 it has 19 tracks including a bonus track "Feda" that's only on SoundCloud. RJMrLA also released TNB 2 (Takin Niggas Beats) on October 11, 2016. On December 15, 2017, RJMrLA & DJ Mustard released a collaborative album called The Ghetto.

After a couple years with no projects released, RJMrLA dropped what he said was his first real album called On God in 2019. The album had some notable features such as Schoolboy Q, Young Thug, G-Eazy, Snoop Dogg. RJMrLA and the Seattle rapper Choice collaborated for the release of Rich of Mackin 2 in April 2020. In July that same year, RJMrLA dropped another project titled Let Me Talk My Shit. In October 2022, RJMrLA dropped another album called Rodney Brown Jr., which featured guest appearances from prominent West Coast artists Roddy Ricch and Ty Dolla Sign.

In 19 June 2024, he performed his song "Get Rich", for Kendrick Lamar's concert The Pop Out: Ken & Friends at the Kia Forum in Inglewood, California, during the first set by DJ Hed, titled the Act I – DJ Hed & Friends. He was featured in the Calmatic-directed music video for Lamar's song "Squabble Up", from his 2024 album GNX.

== Discography ==
=== Albums ===
List of albums, with selected details
Title	Album details
MrLA	Released: May 26, 2017; Label: 400 Summers; Formats: Digital download
The Ghetto (with DJ Mustard)	Released: December 15, 2017; Label: 10 Summers, Interscope; Formats: Digital download
On God	Released: August 9, 2019; Label: OMMIO, Empire; Formats: Streaming

=== Mixtapes ===
List of mixtapes, with selected details
Title	Album details
O.M.M.I.O.	Released: September 25, 2013; Label: Pushaz Ink; Formats: Digital download
Takin Niggas Beats	Released: July 15, 2014; Label: Pushaz Ink; Formats: Digital download
Rich Off Mackin (with Choice)	Released: January 12, 2015; Label: 10 Summers; Formats: Digital download
O.M.M.I.O. 2	Released: May 26, 2015; Label: 10 Summers; Formats: CD, Digital download
10 Summers: The Mixtape Vol. 1 (with 10 Summers)	Released: July 23, 2015; Label: 10 Summers; Format: Digital download
O.M.M.I.O. 3	Released: May 12, 2016; Label: 10 Summers; Formats: Digital download
TNB 2	Released: October 11, 2016; Label: 10 Summers, 4Hunnid; Formats: Digital download
The Bitch Tape	Scheduled: February 2024; Label: OMMIO, Empire; Formats: Digital download

=== Guest appearances ===
List of non-single guest appearances, with other performing artists, showing year released and album name
Title	Year	Other artist(s)	Album
"Bitchez"	2013	YG	Just Re'd Up 2
"Bounce That"	2013	DJ Mustard, TeeCee4800, Royce the Choice, Reem Riches, Casey Veggies, Skeme	Ketchup
"Been from the Gang"	2013	DJ Mustard, YG, Nipsey Hussle, Kay Ess	Ketchup
"Don't Trust Nobody"	2013	DJ Mustard, Killa Kam, Reem Riches, JaywhiteT	Ketchup
"Fuck the City Up"	2013	Jinx	The Weekend
"Thank God (Interlude)"	2014	YG, Big TC	My Krazy Life
"When I Was Gone"	2014	YG, Tee Cee, Charlie Hood, Reem Riches, Slim 400	My Krazy Life
"Get Money, Fuck'n Bitches"	2014	Slim 400, D-Lo	Keepin' It 400
"Low Low"	2014	DJ Mustard, Nipsey Hussle, TeeCee4800	10 Summers
"Throw Your Hood Up"	2014	DJ Mustard, Dom Kennedy, Royce	10 Summers
"No Reason"	2014	DJ Mustard, YG, Jeezy, Nipsey Hussle	10 Summers
"Ride With Me"	2014	YG, Nipsey Hussle	Blame It On the Streets
"G$FB"	2014	YG, Slim 400, D-Lo	Blame It On the Streets
"Problems"	2015	AD	Blue: 89
"You Know What It Is"	2015	AD, Manolo Rose, Icewear Vezzo	Blue: 89
"Mr. Get Dough"	2015	DJ Mustard, Choice, Drakeo the Ruler	—N/a
"My Flag / Da Homies"	2015	The Game, Ty Dolla $ign, Jay 305, AD, Mitchy Slick, Joe Moses, Skeme	The Documentary 2.5
"Strapped"	2016	AD, Sorry Jaynari, G Perico	By the Way
"BOW"	2016	Phat Stax, Rimpau	Pac Ave
"Full Fledge"	2016	Hitta J3	The Collect Call
"Remind Her"	2016	Eric Bellinger	Eric B for President: Term 1
"Ridin' Around"	2016	DJ Mustard, Nipsey Hussle	Cold Summer
"Know My Name"	2016	DJ Mustard, Rich The Kid	Cold Summer
"Main Bitch"	2016	DJ Mustard	Cold Summer
"Get Out Yo Feelin's"	2016	YG	Red Friday
"Stay Mobbin"	2017	DJ Asap, Iamsu!, Derek King	—N/a
"Ridin' Out"	2017	AD, Wiz Khalifa	Blue 89 C2
"Gangsta Report"	2018–2019	Philthy Rich	Fake Love
"Ventalation"	2018–2019	Snoop Dogg, Stupid Young	I Wanna Thank Me
"Do Yo Dance"	2018–2019	YG, Kamaiyah, Mitch, Ty Dolla $ign	4Real 4Real
"Rags to Ritches"	2018–2019	Rucci	Tako's Son
"Over Me"	2018–2019	G-Eazy, Jay Ant	The Vault
"Scary Times"	2026	The Game, Lit Papi, BG 100, Wacko, EastSide K-Boy, Almighty Joey	The Documentary III
"In the Way"	2026	The Game, Tyga	The Documentary III
"The Part"	2026	The Game, Lefty Gunplay, YG, Mark Lux, JasonMartin, Mike & Keys	The Documentary III
"Hella"	2026	The Game, E-40, Serrin Joy, Mike & Joys	The Documentary III
