= Saved (Ty Dolla Sign song) =

2015 single by Ty Dolla Sign

Single by Ty Dolla Sign featuring E-40

from the album Free TC
- Released: October 16, 2015
- Recorded: 2015
- Genre: Trap
- Length: 2:58
- Label: Atlantic
- Songwriters: Tyrone Griffin, Jr.; Earl Stevens; Dijon McFarlane; Khaled Rohaim; Nicholas Audino; Lewis Hughes; Glenda Proby; Bobby Brackins
- Producers: DJ Mustard; Twice as Nice

Ty Dolla Sign singles chronology
"Play No Games" (2015)	"Saved" (2015)	"Wavy" (2016)

E-40 singles chronology
"No Time Outs" (2015)	"Saved" (2015)	"Law" (2016)

"Saved" is a song by American singer Ty Dolla Sign included on his debut studio album, Free TC (2015), and features American rapper E-40. The track was released on October 16, 2015, as the third single from the album. It was written by its performers alongside Glenda Proby, Bobby Brackins, and its producers DJ Mustard and Twice as Nice. The official music video for "Saved" was released on November 16, 2015. It was directed by Elliott Sellers.

"Saved" peaked at number 81 on the Billboard Hot 100, and received platinum certification by the Recording Industry Association of America (RIAA).

== Background ==
"Saved" was written by Ty, E-40, Glenda Proby, Bobby Brackins, and its producers DJ Mustard and Twice as Nice. Ty and E-40 previously collaborated on the tracks "Chitty Bang" and "That's Right". In 2015, after releasing "Only Right", "Blasé" and "When I See Ya" off his debut studio album, Free TC, Ty released "Saved" as the third official single (second sent to radio) of the album on October 16, 2015. Free TC was released on November 13, 2015.

== Music video ==
A music video for "Saved" premiered on Ty's official YouTube channel on November 16, 2015. It was directed by Elliott Sellers, who previously directed the video for Ty's "When I See Ya". The video opens with Ty sitting atop a golden throne in the clouds. He's surrounded by women who are trying to "get saved", but he ignores them all and sings, "I ain’t gonna save her." It also shows Ty standing in the clouds and performing with E-40. The song's co-producer DJ Mustard also makes a cameo appearance. The video received acclaim by music critics. Uproxx's Beware called the video "stunning" and wrote that it "not only looks beautiful, it fits the concept". Ted Simmons of XXL commented that "the video is an example of Ty’s strength, marrying the high and the low".

== Credits ==
Credits adapted from Free TC liner notes.

Personnel

- Vocals – Ty Dolla Sign, E-40
- Songwriting – Tyrone Griffin, Jr., Earl Stevens, Dijon McFarlane, Khaled Rohaim, Nicholas Audino, Lewis Hughes, Glenda Proby, Bobby Brackins
- Production – DJ Mustard, Twice as Nice

== Charts ==
=== Weekly charts ===
Chart (2016)	Peak position
US Billboard Hot 100	81
US Hot R&B/Hip-Hop Songs (Billboard)	25
US Rhythmic Airplay (Billboard)	3

=== Year-end charts ===
Chart (2016)	Position
US Rhythmic (Billboard)	28

== Certifications ==
Region	Certification	Certified units/sales
Canada (Music Canada)	Gold	40,000^{‡}
United States (RIAA)	Platinum	1,000,000^{‡}
^{‡} Sales+streaming figures based on certification alone.

== Release history ==
Country	Date	Format	Label
United States	October 16, 2015	Digital download	Taylor Gang Records; Atlantic Records
United States	November 8, 2015	Rhythmic radio	Taylor Gang Records; Atlantic Records
