= Free TC =

Studio album by Ty Dolla Sign
- Released: November 13, 2015
- Studios: Ameraycan (North Hollywood); Conway; The Freezer; The Grill; Sunset Sound Recorders; Westlake (Los Angeles); Ty's Tour Bus (United States); Windmark (Santa Monica)
- Genres: Hip-hop; trap; R&B
- Length: 72:34
- Label: Atlantic
- Producers: Babyface; Benny Blanco; Cardo; Chordz; D'Mile; Dave Kuncio; DJ Khalil; DJ Mustard; DJ Spinz; The Dramaticz; Flippa; Hit-Boy; Johnny Juliano; Metro Boomin; Mike Free; Nate 3D; Noah Breakfast; Pop Wansel; The Rascals; Rance; Shafiq Husayn; Stargate; Thundercat; Twice as Nice; Two Inch Punch; Ty Dolla Sign

Ty Dolla Sign chronology
Beach House EP (2014)	Free TC (2015)	Campaign (2016)

Singles from Free TC
- 1. "Only Right" Released: May 15, 2015; 2. "Blasé" Released: June 26, 2015; 3. "Saved" Released: October 16, 2015; 4. "Wavy" Released: January 16, 2016

Free TC is the debut studio album by American rapper and singer Ty Dolla Sign. It was released on November 13, 2015, by Atlantic Records. As executive producers, Ty Dolla Sign and Wiz Khalifa enlisted a variety of collaborators, including DJ Mustard, DJ Spinz, Cardo, Johnny Juliano, Kendrick Lamar, Brandy, Rae Sremmurd, E-40, Future, and Kanye West, among others.

Free TC received generally positive reviews from critics. The album debuted at number 14 on the US Billboard 200, selling 31,000 units in its first week. It was supported by three singles: "Only Right", "Blasé", and "Saved". The deluxe version was released on March 25, 2016, with four bonus tracks, including the single "Wavy".

== Promotion ==
On October 13, 2015, while Ty Dolla Sign was prepping for the release of Free TC, he released his sixth mixtape Airplane Mode. On October 15, the album's final track listing was revealed through his SoundCloud account, in which Ty Dolla Sign told his incarcerated brother TC (to whom the album is dedicated) over the phone about each track and how they came up with it together.

=== Singles ===
The album's first single, "Only Right", was released on May 15, 2015. The song features guest appearances from American rappers YG, Joe Moses, and TeeCee4800, while the production was handled by Mike Free and DJ Mustard.

The album's lead single, "Blasé", was released on June 26, 2015. The song features guest appearances from American rapper Future and hip-hop duo Rae Sremmurd, while the production was handled by DJ Spinz. "Blasé" was sent to radio and the song later charted on the US Billboard Hot 100. On August 2, 2016, it was certified platinum by the Recording Industry Association of America (RIAA).

The album's third single, "Saved", was released on October 16, 2015. The song features a guest appearance from American rapper E-40, while the production was handled by DJ Mustard and Twice as Nice. "Saved" was sent to radio and later charted on the Billboard Hot 100. On July 28, 2016, it was certified gold by the Recording Industry Association of America (RIAA).

The album's fourth single, "Wavy", was released on January 16, 2016. The song features a guest appearance from American rapper Joe Moses, while the production was handled by DJ Mustard and Twice as Nice. On December 7, 2016, "Wavy" was certified gold by the Recording Industry Association of America (RIAA).

=== Promotional singles ===
The album's first promotional single, "When I See Ya", was released on September 10, 2015. The song features a guest appearance from American rapper Fetty Wap, while the production was handled by Cardo and Johnny Juliano.

The album's second promotional single, "Solid", was released on October 23, 2015. The song features a guest appearance from American R&B singer-songwriter Babyface, who also serves its production alongside The Rascals, D'Mile, and Ty Dolla Sign.

== Critical reception ==
Professional ratings
Aggregate scores
Source	Rating
AnyDecentMusic?	7.1/10
Metacritic	76/100
Review scores
Source	Rating
AllMusic	4/5 stars
Consequence	B
Entertainment Weekly	A−
Exclaim!	7/10
The Guardian	3/5 stars
HipHopDX	4.0/5
Pitchfork	7.7/10
Pretty Much Amazing	B
Rolling Stone	3.5/5 stars
Spin	7/10

Free TC was met with generally positive reviews. At Metacritic, which assigns a normalized rating out of 100 to reviews from mainstream publications, the album received an average score of 76, based on 16 reviews. Aggregator AnyDecentMusic? gave it 7.1 out of 10, based on their assessment of the critical consensus.

David Jeffries of AllMusic said, "Numerous proven mixtapes help set Ty up for an easier introduction than most, but Free TC tops all expectations, as the man conquers the club, the bedroom, and the brain with this end-to-end stunner". Brain Josephs of Consequence said, "For all of Free TC's turn-up nut-grabbing, it's the beating heart that ends up stealing the show". Kyle Anderson of Entertainment Weekly said, "Free TC could use some editing, but Ty has enough charm to carry bedroom jams, Cadillac bangers, and folk-funk experiments all at once". In a positive review for Exclaim!, Calum Slingerland praised Ty's talent in composition and arrangement, writing "what could have easily been a 16-track collection of Griffin's ambition becoming his downfall is a worthwhile look at the multifaceted nature of his musical brain". Claire Lobenfeld of Fact said, "This is not the moment where he will become a superstar, but it's a promising beginning to what should be a very long career". Shirley Ju of HipHopDX said, "So, all in all, Ty delivers a light, layered debut, with more depth than we thought could be drawn out of the trap&B sound he helped usher into the mainstream".

Jon Caramanica of The New York Times said, "Free TC—often exceptional, and easily one of the best R&B albums of this year—is elaborate in conception and execution but still feels off the cuff". Rebecca Haithcoat of Pitchfork said, "His confidence is why he flies when he swings for the fences on his new album, Free TC". Corbin Reiff of Rolling Stone said, "Free TC, dedicated to Dolla $ign's currently incarcerated brother, marries a diverse range of earworm-level hooks and genre-bridging rhythms to uncomfortably base themes". Winston Cook-Wilson of Spin said, "The album is a dense, cinematic, always surprising and often moving album that sounds like it required the full three years that the L.A. crooner and producer spent chipping away at it to get right". Lanre Bakare of The Guardian said, "[The] cameo-packed tracks fail to live up to the billing, often feeling too long and lacking the punch of Dolla $ign's previous output".

=== Rankings ===
Select year-end rankings of Free TC
Publication	List	Rank	Ref.
Complex	The Best Albums of 2015	25	
The Hundreds	Top 25 Albums of 2015	18	
The New York Times	The Best Albums of 2015 by Jon Caramanica	4	
New York Daily News	Best of hip-hop albums: Class of 2015	10	
Pigeons & Planes	Best Albums of 2015	39	
Rolling Stone	20 Best R&B Albums of 2015	10	
Uproxx	The 15 Best Rap Albums of 2015	14	

== Commercial performance ==
Free TC debuted at number 14 on the US Billboard 200, with 31,000 album-equivalent units, (including 22,000 copies in pure album sales) in its first week. On February 7, 2018, the album was certified gold by the Recording Industry Association of America (RIAA), for combined sales and album-equivalent units of over 500,000 units in the United States.

== Track listing ==
Free TC track listing
No.	Title	Writer(s)	Producer(s)	Length
1.	"LA" (featuring Kendrick Lamar, Brandy and James Fauntleroy)	Tyrone Griffin Jr.; Kendrick Duckworth; James Fauntleroy; Darius Logan; Dominique Logan; Dernst Emile II; Marlon Barrow; Nate Howard; Yves Bazelais Jr.	Chordz; D'Mile; Ty Dolla Sign	5:07
2.	"Saved" (featuring E-40)	T. Griffin; Earl Stevens; Dijon McFarlane; Nike Audino; Khaled Rohaim; Lewis Hughes; Glenda Proby; Bobby Brackins	DJ Mustard; Twice as Nice	2:58
3.	"Straight Up" (featuring Jagged Edge)	T. Griffin; Andrew Wansel; Ronald Colson; Autoro Whitfield; Proby; Shereelyn Brown; Patrice Rushen; Fred Washington; Brandon Casey; Bryan Casey; Bryan-Michael Cox; Jermaine Dupri	Pop Wansel; Flippa; Toro^{[a]}	5:01
4.	"Solid" (featuring Babyface)	T. Griffin; Kristopher Van Riddick-Tynes; Proby; Paris Jones; Kenneth Edmonds	Babyface; The Rascals; D'Mile^{[b]}; Ty Dolla Sign^{[b]}	4:19
5.	"Horses in the Stable"	T. Griffin; Latisha Hyman; Dave Kuncio; Larrance Dopson	Kuncio; Rance	3:06
6.	"Know Ya" (featuring Trey Songz)	T. Griffin; Tremaine Neverson; Leland Wayne; Joseph Allen; Gary Hill	Metro Boomin; DJ Spinz	4:52
7.	"Credit" (featuring Sevyn Streeter)	T. Griffin; Emile; Proby; Barrow; Kenneth Coby; Cychae Strahan; Brandon Hamlin; Devin Montgomery	D'Mile; Chordz; Ty Dolla Sign; Cy Fyre^{[b]}; B Ham^{[b]}; Devin Cruise^{[b]}; Soundz^{[b]}	6:11
8.	"Miracle / Wherever" (featuring Big TC and D-Loc)	T. Griffin; Emile; Wayne; Nate Welsh; Gabreal Griffin; Christopher Jones; Angel Griffin	D'Mile; Nate 3D; Ty Dolla Sign	8:15
9.	"Guard Down" (featuring Kanye West and Diddy)	T. Griffin; Kanye West; Sean Combs; Chauncey Hollis; P. Jones	Hit-Boy	4:56
10.	"Sitting Pretty" (featuring Wiz Khalifa)	T. Griffin; Cameron Thomaz; Benjamin Levin; Ben Ash; Noah Beresin; Jazzae de Waal	Benny Blanco; Two Inch Punch; Noah Breakfast	3:26
11.	"When I See Ya" (featuring Fetty Wap)	T. Griffin; Willie Maxwell II; Ronald LaTour; Brock Korsan; Johnny Juliano; Coby	Cardo; Juliano	3:34
12.	"Blasé" (featuring Future and Rae Sremmurd)	T. Griffin; Nayvadius Wilburn; Khalif Brown; Aaquil Brown; Hill; Marquis Medina	DJ Spinz	4:46
13.	"Only Right" (featuring YG, Joe Moses and TeeCee4800)	T. Griffin; Keenon Jackson; Joseph Allen; Marquise Newman; McFarlane; Mikely Adam	Mike Free; DJ Mustard	3:10
14.	"Bring It Out of Me"	T. Griffin; Mikkel Storleer Eriksen; Tor Erik Hermansen; Proby; Paolo Prudencio	Stargate	3:45
15.	"Actress" (featuring R. Kelly)	T. Griffin; Robert Kelly; Emile	D'Mile	6:12
16.	"Finale" (featuring Sa-Ra and PJ)	T. Griffin; Khalil Abdul-Rahman; Sam Barsh; Om'Mas Keith; Shafiq Husayn; Taz Arnold; P. Jones; Drumaticz Kingdom; Stephen Bruner	Husayn; DJ Khalil	2:53
Total length:				72:34

Deluxe edition (bonus tracks)
No.	Title	Writer(s)	Producer(s)	Length
17.	"Like a Drug"	T. Griffin; Eugene Padgett	YungFlamez	4:42
18.	"Wavy" (featuring Joe Moses)	T. Griffin; Allen; McFarlane	DJ Mustard; Twice as Nice	3:07
19.	"Long Time" (featuring Quavo)	T. Griffin; Quavious Marshall; Wayne	Metro Boomin	3:08
20.	"Westside"	T. Griffin; Jodd Knight; Kristal Oliver; Kristofer Murray; Alexander Izquierdo; Gamal Lewis	DJ Mustard	4:05
Total length:				87:32

Notes

- ^{^[a]} signifies a co-producer
- ^{^[b]} signifies an additional producer
- "LA" features additional vocals by Nate Howard and D&D
- "Straight Up" features additional vocals by Jacob Luttrell and outro vocals from Ryan Brady
- "Know Ya" features intro vocals from Keke Palmer
- "Credit" features additional vocals from Micah Powell and Tiffany Gouché, and outro vocals from Big TC and D-Loc
- "Miracle / Whatever" features background vocals by Michah Powell, Angel Gold, and Sevyn Streeter
- "Guard Down" features additional vocals by Nico & Vinz
- "Actress" features outro vocals by French Montana, D-Loc, Big TC, and Malik Yusef
- "Finale" features background vocals from Sunny Bey, Shafiq Husayn, Om'Mas Keith, Taz Arnold, and Stephen "Thundercat" Bruner

Sample credits

- "Straight Up" contains a sample of "Settle For My Love", written by Shereelyn Brown, Patrice Rushen, and Fred Washington, as performed by Patrice Rushen; and an interpolation of "Let's Get Married", written by Brandon Casey, Bryan Casey, Bryan-Michael Cox, and Jermaine Dupri, as performed by Jagged Edge.

== Personnel ==
Credits adapted from the album's liner notes.

Musicians

- DJ Battlecat – talkbox (track 1)
- Benjamin Wright – conductor, arranger ritesonian (tracks 1, 4, 6–9)
- Kevin Brandon – bass (tracks 1, 4, 6–9)
- H. L. Estrada – bass (tracks 1, 4, 6–9)
- Peggy Baldwin – cello (tracks 1, 4, 6–9)
- Giovanna Clayton – cello (tracks 1, 4, 6–9)
- Maria Martinez – cello (tracks 1, 4, 6–9)
- Nancy Stein-Ross – cello (tracks 1, 4, 6–9)
- Caroline Buckman – viola (tracks 1, 4, 6–9)
- Jorge Moraga – viola (tracks 1, 4, 6–9)
- Jimbo Ross – viola (tracks 1, 4, 6–9)
- S. L. Smith – viola (tracks 1, 4, 6–9)
- Mark Cargill – violin (concertmaster) (tracks 1, 4, 6–9)
- Richard Adkins – violin (tracks 1, 4, 6–9)
- Minyoung Chang – violin (tracks 1, 4, 6–9)
- Susan Chatman – violin (tracks 1, 4, 6–9)
- Nicole Garcia – violin (tracks 1, 4, 6–9)
- Terry Glenny – violin (tracks 1, 4, 6–9)
- Neel Hammond – violin (tracks 1, 4, 6–9)
- Kathleen Robertson – violin (tracks 1, 4, 6–9)
- Lesa Terry – violin (tracks 1, 4, 6–9)
- C. M. Woods – violin (tracks 1, 4, 6–9)
- Donnie Meadows – production coordination (track 3)
- Tanisha Broadwater – production coordination (track 3)
- The Down Low Horns – horns (tracks 3, 8)
- Tyrone "Pops" Griffin Sr. – trumpet, flugelhorn (tracks 3, 8), horns (track 8)
- Tim Anderson – saxophone (tracks 3, 8)
- Richard Moorings – trombone (tracks 3, 8)
- Terrace Martin – alto saxophone (track 7), talkbox (track 8)
- Kenny Crouch – piano (tracks 7, 8)
- Mars – additional piano (track 7)
- Benny Blanco – instrumentation (track 10)
- Two Inch Punch – instrumentation (track 10)
- Noah Breakfast – instrumentation (track 10)
- Andrew "McMuffin" Luftman – production coordination (track 10)
- Seih "Mageef" Hussain – production coordination (track 10)
- Mikkel Eriksen – instruments (track 14)
- Tor Hermansen – instruments (track 14)
- Take Blacksmith – production coordination, executive production (Tim & Danny Music) (track 14)
- Danny D – production coordination, executive production (Tim & Danny Music) (track 14)
- Sam Barsh – keyboards (track 16)
- Daniel Seeff – upright bass (track 16)

Technical

- Dave Kutch – mastering (all tracks)
- Andy Barnes – recording (tracks 1–5, 7–9, 11–13, 15), additional recording (track 10), engineering (track 10)
- Derek "MixedByAli" Ali – mixing (track 1)
- James Royo – mixing (tracks 2, 13)
- Jorge Taveras – mixing assistance (track 2)
- Jean-Marie Horvat – mixing (tracks 3, 5, 7–9, 16)
- Paul Boutin – mixing (track 4)
- Ty Dolla Sign – recording (tracks 6, 12)
- Keke Palmer – recording (track 6)
- John Kercy – mixing (tracks 6, 15)
- Chris "Anger Management" Schlafani – engineer (track 10)
- Serban Ghenea – mixing (track 10)
- John Hanes – engineer (mixing) (track 10)
- Phil Seaford – engineer (mixing) (track 10)
- Jaycen Joshua – mixing (track 11)
- Ryan Kaul – mixing assistance (track 11)
- Seth Firkins – mixing (track 12)
- Victor Luevanos – mixing assistance (track 13)
- Mikkel Eriksen – recording (track 14)
- Miles Walker – recording (track 14)
- Phil Tan – mixing (track 14)
- Daniel Rivera – additional and assistance engineering (track 14)
- Shafiq Husayn – recording (track 16), engineering (track 16)
- DJ Khalil – recording (track 16), engineering (track 16)
- Om'Mas Keith – vocal production (track 16), engineering (track 16)
- Taz Arnold – vocal production (track 16)

Additional personnel

- Danny Zook – sample clearance
- Ron Cahiltes – sample clearance (Alien Music)
- Carolyn Tracey – packaging production
- Virgilio Tzaj – art direction, design
- Jory Lee Cordy – photography

== Charts ==
=== Weekly charts ===
Chart performance for Free TC
Chart (2015)	Peak position
Australian Albums (ARIA)	87
Belgian Albums (Ultratop Flanders)	132
Canadian Albums (Billboard)	45
French Albums (SNEP)	159
UK Albums (Official Charts)	93
UK R&B Albums (Official Charts)	8
US Billboard 200	14
US Top R&B/Hip-Hop Albums (Billboard)	4

=== Year-end charts ===
2016 year-end chart performance for Free TC
Chart (2016)	Position
US Billboard 200	135
US Top R&B/Hip-Hop Albums (Billboard)	50

== Certifications ==
Certifications for Free TC
Region	Certification	Certified units/sales
United States (RIAA)	Gold	500,000^{‡}
^{‡} Sales+streaming figures based on certification alone.

== Release history ==
Release dates and formats for Free TC
Region	Date	Label	Format(s)	Edition	Ref.
Various	November 13, 2015	Atlantic	CD; digital download	Standard	
Various	March 25, 2016	Atlantic	CD; digital download	Deluxe	
Various	April 20, 2016	Atlantic	Vinyl	Standard	
