= My Krazy Life =

2014 studio album by YG

Studio album by YG
- Released: March 18, 2014
- Studios: Ameraycan (North Hollywood); Encore; Hollywood Way (Burbank); Icon; PatchWerk (Atlanta); No Excuses; Windmark (Santa Monica); Premier (New York City); Record Plant (Los Angeles)
- Genre: West Coast hip hop
- Length: 46:30
- Labels: Pushaz Ink; CTE; Def Jam
- Producers: B Wheezy; C. Ballin; Chordz; DJ Mustard; Metro Boomin; Mike Free; Ty Dolla Sign

YG chronology
My Krazy Life (2014)	Blame It On the Streets (2014)

Deluxe edition cover

Singles from My Krazy Life
- 1. "My Nigga" Released: September 17, 2013; 2. "Left, Right" Released: December 10, 2013; 3. "Who Do You Love?" Released: February 11, 2014; 4. "Do It to Ya" Released: September 2, 2014

My Krazy Life is the debut studio album by American rapper YG. It was released on March 18, 2014, through CTE World and Pushaz Ink, and distributed by Def Jam Recordings. The album features guest appearances from Kendrick Lamar, Drake, Lil Wayne, Nicki Minaj, Rich Homie Quan, Ty Dolla Sign, Schoolboy Q, Meek Mill, Jay Rock, Tory Lanez, Jeezy, TeeFlii and RJ, while the production was primarily handled by frequent collaborator DJ Mustard, along with production from Ty Dolla Sign and Terrace Martin.

My Krazy Life was supported by four singles: "My Nigga", "Left, Right", "Who Do You Love?" and "Do It to Ya". "My Nigga" peaked at number 19 on the US Billboard Hot 100 chart and was later certified five times platinum by the Recording Industry Association of America (RIAA). YG also released multiple mixtapes leading up to the album's release including the Just Re'd Up series, and the DJ Mustard-produced 4Hunnid Degreez.

The album received generally positive reviews from critics. It debuted at number two on the US Billboard 200 and sold 61,000 copies in its first week. The album was certified platinum by the Recording Industry Association of America (RIAA) in April 2017.

== Background ==
In 2009, after serving six months in jail on residential burglary charges, YG signed a deal to Def Jam Recordings. While he was still in jail, his music had been generating buzz on Myspace. When YG was released from jail, he began going into meetings from Atlantic Records to Def Jam, where they just chose him to sign with the latter due to brand recognition. The majority of label attention had come from his collaboration with Ty Dolla Sign on his song "Toot It and Boot It", which ended up peaking on the US Billboard Hot 100, after being re-released by Def Jam. After he revealed that his debut album would be named I'm From Bompton. He explained that title saying, "I changed the C to a B because it's where I'm from and it's also bringing something new. It's drawing more attention, you feel me? And it's, like, I'm not doing it to draw attention. I'm doing it to because that's really what I say and that's really where I'm from. I'm from Bompton...You gonna feel like you're from Brompton too when you're done listening to the album."

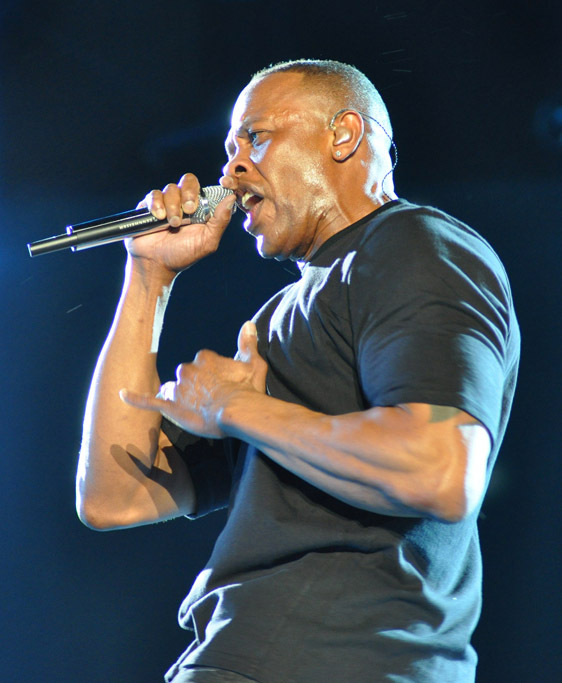
When working on the album YG took inspiration from various classic West Coast hip hop albums, including Dr. Dre's (pictured) The Chronic.

In January 2012, YG changed the album's tentative title to Freshman on Campus, however, that title would not last long and he would change it back. In June 2013, YG revealed that he signed a deal to Jeezy's record label CTE World. On September 4, 2013, YG announced that he had changed the name of his debut album from I'm From Bompton to My Krazy Life. He explained the change saying Jeezy asked him, "Who do you want to support your album? Do you want a certain type of people or do you want the whole world?" YG responded saying the whole world. He then explained, "If my album was called I'm From Bompton it means like, I'm gangbanging, so certain people might feel some type of way. They won't purchase my album because I'm gangbanging." He said that the new title and the album summarize a "day in the life of YG."

On December 16, 2013, YG told HipHopDX, "My album is catered to my life, my culture and the West Coast. It’s like a day in the life of YG from the morning until the night." He further explained the subject matter of the album saying, "It's a lot of crazy shit. My album is catered to my life, you feel me? Shit that was really going on in my lifestyle, coming from where I come from, the West Coast, the culture out there. Gang banging, drugs, parties, and, just like every other culture, the same shit. It's a lot of gang banging going on. It's shooting going on. It's robbing going on. It's fucking bitches. All that shit." He also said the album would discuss the hardships he faced growing up in Compton. He elaborated to Vibe saying, "Game told it his way, Kendrick told it his way, I’ma tell it my way. That's what it is, and we all from the same city but we're not the same people. We didn't go through everything the exact same ways. Our rapping style is different, so how I’m coming at shit that's finna' be different. You feel me? At the end of the day it’s all the same, talking about money, bitches and homies. It’s all the same shit it’s just different ways."

Speaking of the music that influenced the album, YG said, "I always listened to Quik, N.W.A, Snoop, Dre, E-40. I was banging all that. Honestly though the shit I was really listening to was Weezy. I think it was the type shit he was rapping about and the way he was doing it that made me want to rap more. I have been listening to Doggystyle and The Chronic and even Kendrick's shit a lot more once I started talking about doing an album." He later included 50 Cent's Get Rich or Die Tryin' and The Notorious B.I.G.'s Life After Death as albums he had taken influence from for this album.

=== "Meet the Flockers" controversy ===
In April 2021, the album was briefly pulled from streaming services due to backlash spurring from the song "Meet the Flockers", which contained a lyric about robbing "Chinese neighborhoods". The album was restored to streaming services with the "Chinese neighborhood" lyric removed from "Meet the Flockers" as a result.

== Recording and production ==
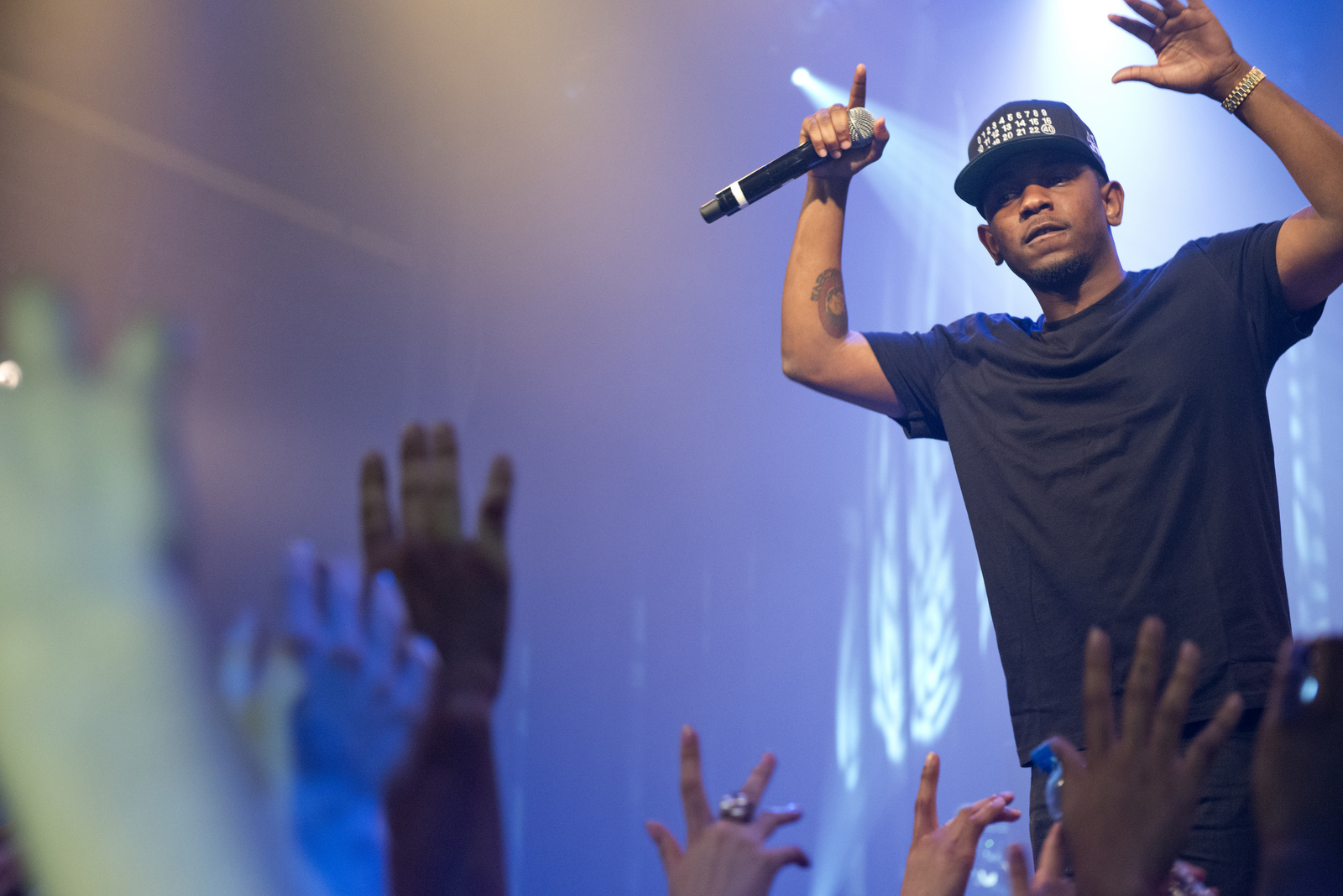
YG collaborated with fellow Compton rapper Kendrick Lamar (pictured) on the song "Really Be (Smokin N Drinkin)".

In 2010, while he's been putting out the releases of his mixtape, he released his debut single, titled "Toot It and Boot It", a collaboration with Ty Dolla Sign. In 2011, YG met a fellow Def Jam artist Jeezy. They formed a relationship and began working together later, as Jeezy used his notoriety to put in a good word for YG at Def Jam. During 2012, YG have been doing some recording in Miami, Florida. The majority of the album was recorded in Los Angeles, California and Atlanta, Georgia. On January 27, 2014, YG told MTV, that the album was 90% finished and he only had one record left, until the album is officially completed.

On March 11, 2013, YG told MTV, that it was his intention to keep the featured artists to a minimum on the album. On September 4, 2013, YG confirmed that he would have a song featured on the album titled "Who Do You Love" featuring Drake. He also confirmed collaborations with Jeezy and Rich Homie Quan. XXL reported that he also worked with The Game on the album. The Source also reported that he had collaborated with Yo Gotti and Nipsey Hussle on the album. The track listing revealed guest appearances on the album would come from Schoolboy Q, Jay Rock, Tee Cee, Jeezy, Rich Homie Quan, Drake, Lil Wayne, Nicki Minaj, Kendrick Lamar, Ty Dolla Sign, TeeFlii, Meek Mill, Tory Lanez, Charlie Hood, Reem Riches, Slim 400, Big TC and RJ.

YG has said that he did not want to work with any producers besides the ones he has been working with for years. Shortly after the release of Just Re'd Up 2, YG confirmed that Young Jeezy would be the album's executive producer. In a December 2013 interview with Vice, YG said that DJ Mustard would produce at least seven of the album's tracks. On December 16, 2013, YG told HipHopDX that DJ Mustard produced 90% of the album, with Ty Dolla Sign and Terrace Martin also producing one track each. The final version of the album featured production from DJ Mustard, Ty Dolla Sign, Metro Boomin, Terrace Martin, B. Wheezy and Chordz 3D.

== Music and lyrics ==
The album begins with "Momma Speech Intro" a 15-second intro of YG's mother screaming out to him, warning him that he "better not be outside with them gangbangers." This sets the tone for the rest of the album, as it is filled with skits that reenact moments of YG's life. "I Just Want To Party" features fellow Los Angeles rappers Schoolboy Q and Jay Rock. The song is notable for featuring a collaboration with rappers affiliated, with the Bloods (YG and Jay Rock), and Crips (Schoolboy Q) street gangs. However, the song aims to put affiliations and street politics aside to party. On the Ty Dolla Sign-produced "Really Be (Smokin' & Drinkin')", YG and Kendrick Lamar rap about using substances to numb the pain. Lamar justifies his affinity for alcohol and other vices by detailing the messed up things that's happened to him recently, including the death of his friend Chad. The album closer "Sorry Momma" is an ode to YG's mother that features a gospel-like chorus sung by Ty Dolla Sign and a soulful saxophone backed instrumental created by Terrace Martin.

== Release and promotion ==
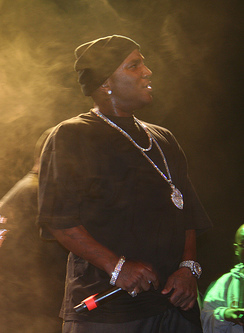
YG was featured heavily on the CTE World compilation mixtape Boss Yo Life Up Gang, which was helmed by Jeezy.

While building his buzz for his debut album, YG released various mixtapes throughout the year of 2012, including 4Fingaz, The Real 4Fingaz, Just Re'd Up and 4Hunnid Degreez. On January 21, 2013, YG released another mixtape, Just Re'd Up 2. Just Re'd Up 2 featured guest appearances from Jeezy, Wiz Khalifa, Nipsey Hussle, Dom Kennedy, Juicy J, Ty Dolla Sign, TeeFlii, Ray J and Young Scooter, among others. The mixtape received generally positive reviews from critics. Before its release, he decided that it would be his final mixtape before his debut studio album's release. He was then featured on seven tracks on the CTE World mixtape Boss Yo Life Up Gang.

In March 2013, YG stated that the album would be released in August 2013. Then on September 4, 2013, YG appeared on MTV's RapFix with Jeezy, and announced that the album would be released on November 19, 2013, however that date would shortly be pushed back. On December 11, 2013, YG revealed that My Krazy Life would be released on March 18, 2014 by YG's Pushaz Ink, CTE World and Def Jam. He chose to release the album that day, as it is the five year anniversary of him going to prison. This was done to represent his journey and growth as an artist since then.

From September 25, 2013 to November 19, 2013, YG toured as a supporting act during Yo Gotti's I Am Tour. Then on March 6, 2014, YG announced the My Krazy Life concert tour. The tour begun on March 29, 2014 and will visit over 30 cities, before ending on June 4, 2014. YG is accompanied by DJ Mustard for the entirety of the tour. YG released the first part of a new webisode series named, after the album on January 9, 2014. Then on February 18, 2014, the album's cover artwork was revealed. The artwork features YG posing for a mugshot, with his name and album title detailed in the placard around his neck. YG will also release a documentary to coincide with the album's release. The short trailer featured Drake, ASAP Rocky, Kendrick Lamar, Jeezy, Meek Mill, Terrace Martin, DJ Mustard, Don Cannon and Rich Homie Quan praising the growth and progress of YG.

== Singles ==
On September 4, 2013, YG released the music video for the lead single, "My Nigga" featuring Jeezy and Rich Homie Quan, while the production was handled by DJ Mustard. On September 17, 2013, "My Nigga" was officially released for digital download as the album's first single. The song has since peaked at number 19 on the US Billboard Hot 100 and has sold over 2,000,000 copies. The official remix featuring Lil Wayne, Meek Mill and Nicki Minaj, alongside YG and Rich Homie Quan was released on January 22, 2014.

The album's second single, "Left, Right", was released on November 28, 2013, via Jeezy's #ItsThaWorld2 mixtape. The song features vocals from DJ Mustard, who also produced the song as well. The single was officially released via digital download on December 10, 2013. On January 29, 2014, the music video was released for "Left, Right", in which YG and DJ Mustard throw a block party in Los Angeles. The video features cameo appearances from Jeezy, Nipsey Hussle and Dom Kennedy.

On September 4, 2013, YG confirmed that he would have a song featured on the album, titled "Who Do You Love?" featuring Drake, which also produced by DJ Mustard. On December 30, 2013, an unfinished version of "Who Do You Love" was leaked online. On January 27, 2014, YG released the official version of "Who Do You Love" and revealed that he would be shooting the music video with Drake soon. It was made available for digital download on iTunes with the album's pre-order on February 20, 2014. The music video was released on March 7, 2014.

"Do It to Ya" impacted US rhythmic contemporary radio on September 2, 2014, as the album's fourth single.

== Critical response ==
Professional ratings
Aggregate scores
Source	Rating
AnyDecentMusic?	7.3/10
Metacritic	80/100
Review scores
Source	Rating
AllMusic	4/5 stars
Consequence of Sound	B
Entertainment Weekly	A−
Exclaim!	8/10
Fact	3.5/5
Pitchfork	8.1/10
Rolling Stone	3.5/5 stars
Spin	9/10
USA Today	2.5/4 stars
XXL	4/5

My Krazy Life was met with generally positive reviews. At Metacritic, which assigns a normalized rating out of 100 to reviews from mainstream publications, the album received an average score of 80, based on 16 reviews. Aggregator AnyDecentMusic? gave it 7.3 out of 10, based on their assessment of the critical consensus.

Brandon Soderberg of Spin called the album "a developed, knotty and, ultimately, deeply moral narrative," comparing it to Kendrick Lamar's Good Kid, m.A.A.d City. Christopher R. Weingarten of Rolling Stone stated, "A 46-minute tale of celebrations and regrets, the debut album from West Coast hot property YG is the most ambitious hip-hop concept LP in a minute." Michael Madden of Consequence of Sound said, "YG's Def Jam debut is earning comparisons to The Chronic for its swerving synth-wheeze and good kid, m.A.A.d City for its cinematic elements (skits, storylines, rapped dialogues). Neither is far off, because here, the gritty, prodigiously horny rapper from Compton has blown the ceiling off his once limited-sounding style." Writing for Pitchfork, Craig Jenkins stated, "It's a record that's always posted up in sunny SoCal, and whether it's serving up carefree party anthems or dispensing crass advice on whose houses to knock over and what to take, L.A. feels like the capital of the country when it’s playing." David Jeffries of AllMusic said, "The album's secret weapon is DJ Mustard who offers numerous productions that are pop like Young Money and bottom-heavy with G-Funk as the blueprint. Think of 50 Cent's Get Rich or Die Tryin' delivered by an inspired rapper in a post-Nicki Minaj world and you're close to the thrill of this inspired debut."

Martín Caballero of USA Today called it a solid debut album and said he had "crafted a worthy new chapter to the [Compton] legacy." Jesse Fairfax of HipHopDX stated, "The Pushaz Ink crew has pieced together a well sequenced and cohesive package with My Krazy Life, but this aspect and his street credibility aren’t enough to win over naysayers expecting an overall greater performance." Erin Lowers of Exclaim! stated, "While YG may fall short lyrically at times, it remains doubtless that he's delivered an unfiltered album that not only rejoices in street tales and defiance, but also the growth stemming from mistakes." Chris Kelly of Fact said, "While My Krazy Life is YG’s debut, it feels more like an album-length celebration of Mustard’s ratchet revolution, a sound distilled from LA G-Funk, Atlanta snap and Bay Area hyphy. [...] Time will tell if this is the beginning of a new era for hip-hop or simply a time capsule of a sound that had its day in the sun." Brian Josephs of XXL said, "As good as My Krazy Life is, it lacks imagination. There's no desire to transcend West Coast inner-city values, and YG does traverse the hyphy and nighttime sounds with aplomb. But the thrills do have a comedown at some point. For the album as a whole, it's the potentially ephemeral replay value because of its on-the-nose focus on 20-somethings mayhem."

=== Accolades ===
Complex named it the best album of the first half of 2014. Writing for them, Brendan Frederick overwhelmingly praised its storytelling, production and saying it was the "undisputed best album of the first half of 2014 and a modern gangsta rap classic." Billboard listed My Krazy Life as the best rap album of 2014.

== Commercial performance ==
My Krazy Life debuted at number two on the US Billboard 200 chart, with first-week sales of 61,000 copies in the United States. In its second week, the album dropped to number seven on the chart, selling an additional 23,000 copies. In its third week, the album dropped to number 16 on the chart, selling 16,000 more copies. In its fourth week, the album dropped to number 18 on the chart, selling 12,000 copies. By December 2014, the album has sold 140,000 copies in the United States. In 2014, the album was ranked as the 94th most popular album of the year on the Billboard 200. On April 27, 2017, the album was certified platinum by the Recording Industry Association of America (RIAA) for combined sales and album-equivalent units of over a million units in the United States.

== Track listing ==
Credits adapted from the album's liner notes.

My Krazy Life track listing
No.	Title	Writer(s)	Producer(s)	Length
1.	"Momma Speech Intro"	Shonee Jackson		0:15
2.	"BPT"	Keenon Jackson; Dijon McFarlane; Brandon Moore	DJ Mustard	2:08
3.	"I Just Wanna Party" (featuring Schoolboy Q and Jay Rock)	Jackson; Quincy Hanley; Johnny McKinzie; McFarlane	DJ Mustard	3:32
4.	"Left, Right" (featuring DJ Mustard)	Jackson; McFarlane	DJ Mustard	3:52
5.	"Bicken Back Being Bool"	Jackson; McFarlane	DJ Mustard	4:03
6.	"Meet the Flockers" (featuring Tee Cee)	Jackson; Marquise Newman; Mikely Adam; McFarlane	Mike Free	2:03
7.	"My Nigga" (featuring Jeezy and Rich Homie Quan)	Jackson; Dequantes Lamar; Jay Jenkins; McFarlane; Adam; Calvin Broadus; Awood Johnson; Craig Lawson; Corey Miller	DJ Mustard; Mike Free^{[a]}	3:55
8.	"Do It to Ya" (featuring TeeFlii)	Jackson; Christian Jones; Chris Jackson; McFarlane; Delmar Arnaud; Broadus; Ricardo Brown; Cynthia Calhoun; Nathaniel Hale; Michel'le Toussant; Luther Campbell; David Hobbs; Mark Ross; Chris Wongwon	DJ Mustard; C. Ballin	4:25
9.	"Me & My Bitch" (featuring Tory Lanez)	Jackson; Daystar Peterson; Brandon Whitfield; Rico Brooks	B Wheezy; Terrace Martin^{[b]}	3:31
10.	"Who Do You Love?" (featuring Drake)	Jackson; Aubrey Graham; McFarlane; Anthony Forté; William Bell; Booker T. Jones	DJ Mustard	3:53
11.	"Really Be (Smokin N Drinkin)" (featuring Kendrick Lamar)	Jackson; Kendrick Duckworth; Marlon Barrow; Tyrone Griffin, Jr.; Moore	Ty Dolla Sign; Chordz; Terrace Martin^{[b]}	5:10
12.	"1AM"	Jackson; Leland Wayne; David Axelrod; Brian Bailey; Melvin Bradford; Broadus; Andre Young	Metro Boomin	2:37
13.	"Thank God (Interlude)" (featuring Big TC and RJ)			2:01
14.	"Sorry Momma" (featuring Ty Dolla Sign)	Jackson; Griffin, Jr.; Terrace Martin; McFarlane; Marlon Barrow	Martin; DJ Mustard^{[a]}	5:05
Total length:				46:30

Deluxe edition (bonus tracks)
No.	Title	Writer(s)	Producer(s)	Length
15.	"When I Was Gone" (featuring RJ, Tee Cee, Charlie Hood, Reem Riches and Slim 400)	Jackson; McFarlane	DJ Mustard	3:21
16.	"Bompton"	Jackson; McFarlane; Cohran	DJ Mustard	2:53
17.	"My Nigga (Remix)" (featuring Lil Wayne, Rich Homie Quan, Meek Mill and Nicki Minaj)	Jackson; Lamar; Adam; McFarlane; Broadus; Jenkins; Johnson; Lawson; Miller	DJ Mustard; Mike Free^{[a]}	3:59
Total length:				56:51

Best Buy deluxe edition bonus track
No.	Title	Writer(s)	Producer(s)	Length
18.	"459" (featuring Natasha Mosley)	Jackson; Natasha Mosley; Clarence Gray, Jr.; Trocon Roberts, Jr.; Steven Bolden	FKi 1st; Big Zar	3:20

Notes

- ^{^[a]} signifies a co-producer
- ^{^[b]} signifies an additional producer
- "BPT" contains background vocals by Jeret Black and Wyann Vaughn
- "I Just Wanna Party" contains background vocals by Wyann Vaughn, and additional vocals by Suga Free, Igor, RJ, Slim 400, Tee Cee, Reem Riches, and Smooth
- "Bicken Back Being Bool" contains additional vocals by Slim 400
- "Meet the Flockers" contains background vocals by Ty Dolla Sign
- "Do It to Ya" contains additional vocals by Wyann Vaughn and Jeret Black
- "Me & My Bitch" contains background vocals by Wyann Vaughn
- "1AM" contains additional vocals by Smooth
- "Sorry Momma" contains additional vocals by Wyann Vaughn

Sample credits

- "My Nigga" contains an interpolation of "Down for My Niggaz", written by Calvin Broadus, Awood Johnson, Craig Lawson and Corey Miller, performed by C-Murder.
- "Do It to Ya" contains interpolations of "Let's Play House", written by Delmar Arnaud, Calvin Broadus, Ricardo Brown, Cynthia Calhoun, Nathaniel Hale and Michel'le Toussant, performed by Tha Dogg Pound; and "Face Down, Ass Up", written by Luther Campbell, David Hobbs, Mark Ross and Chris Wongwon, performed by the 2 Live Crew.
- "Who Do You Love?" contains an interpolation of "Playaz Club", written by Anthony Forté, William Bell and Booker T. Jones, performed by Rappin' 4-Tay.
- "1AM" contains a portion of "The Next Episode", written by David Axelrod, Brian Bailey, Melvin Bradford, Calvin Broadus and Andre Young, performed by Dr. Dre.

== Personnel ==
Album credits for My Krazy Life adapted from AllMusic.

- Mike Free – producer
- Derek Ali – engineer, mixing
- Lucky Alvarez – design
- Battlecat – scratching
- Big TC – featured artist
- Jeret Black – vocals
- Mike Bozzi – audio mastering
- Dee Brown – engineer
- Rodney J. "RJ" Brown – vocals
- B Wheezy – producer
- C-Ballin – producer
- Chordz – producer
- Kenneth Crouch – keyboards
- DJ John John – scratching
- DJ Mustard – executive producer, featured artist, scratching
- Drake – featured artist
- Forty – vocals
- Chris Gehringer – mastering
- Ricky "Grimace" Henry – vocals
- James Hunt – mixing assistant
- Igor – vocals
- Jeezy – executive producer, featured artist
- Kendrick Lamar – featured artist
- Paul Lane – package production
- Tory Lanez – featured artist
- Tai Linzie – art producer, photo production
- Terrace Martin – bass, keyboards, percussion, producer, saxophone
- Dijon McFarlane – basic track, featured artist, producer
- Metro Boomin – producer
- Mike Miller – art direction, photography
- Rich Homie Quan – featured artist
- Ari Raskin – engineer
- Rayneisha – skit
- Reem Riches – vocals
- Jay Rock – featured artist
- James Royo – engineer, mixing
- ScHoolboy Q – featured artist
- Zane Shoemake – engineer
- Sickamore – executive producer
- Slim 400 – vocals
- Smooth – vocals
- Suga Free – vocals
- Tee Cee – featured artist, vocals
- TeeFLii – featured artist
- Ty Dolla Sign – featured artist, producer, vocals
- Wyann Vaughn – vocals
- Marlon Williams – guitar
- Anthony Michael Wyley – engineer
- Yana – skit
- YG – executive producer, primary artist, vocals

== Charts ==
=== Weekly charts ===
Chart performance for My Krazy Life
Chart (2014)	Peak position
Australian Albums (ARIA)	68
Canadian Albums (Billboard)	10
Belgian Albums (Ultratop Wallonia)	161
German Albums (Offizielle Top 100)	94
UK Albums (Official Charts)	76
UK R&B Albums (Official Charts)	9
US Billboard 200	2
US Top R&B/Hip-Hop Albums (Billboard)	1
US Top Rap Albums (Billboard)	1

=== Year-end charts ===
2014 year-end chart performance for My Krazy Life
Chart (2014)	Position
US Billboard 200	94
US Top R&B/Hip-Hop Albums (Billboard)	21
US Top Rap Albums (Billboard)	9

== Certifications ==
Certifications for My Krazy Life
Region	Certification	Certified units/sales
New Zealand (RMNZ)	Platinum	15,000^{‡}
United States (RIAA)	Platinum	1,000,000^{‡}
^{‡} Sales+streaming figures based on certification alone.
