= Wavy (Ty Dolla Sign song) =

Single by Ty Dolla Sign featuring Joe Moses

from the album Free TC
- Released: January 16, 2016
- Genre: West Coast hip hop; electro-hop
- Length: 3:08
- Label: Atlantic
- Songwriters: Tyrone Griffin, Jr.; Joseph Allen; Dijon McFarlane
- Producers: DJ Mustard; Twice as Nice

Ty Dolla Sign singles chronology
"Saved" (2015)	"Wavy" (2016)	"Work from Home" (2016)

Joe Moses singles chronology
"B-Dawg" (2016)	"Wavy" (2016)	"Juggin" (2016)

"Wavy" is a song by American singer Ty Dolla Sign featuring American rapper Joe Moses, included as a bonus track on the former's debut studio album, Free TC (2015). The track was released on January 16, 2016, as the fourth and final single from the album.

== Commercial performance ==
Despite peaking on the US Bubbling Under R&B/Hip-Hop Singles chart, the single is Ty's third most popular song as lead artist on streaming services with over 240 million streams on Spotify as of 2023. It spent 16 consecutive weeks on Billboard (with no official radio release) starting in April 2016. It has also since been certified Platinum by the RIAA.

== Usage in the media ==
"Wavy" has been highly popular with Hip-hop dance. The "1 Million Dance Studio" recorded its own choreography performance to the track. The video has over three million views on YouTube.

== Charts ==
=== Weekly charts ===
Chart (2016)	Peak position
Australia (ARIA)	97
US Bubbling Under R&B/Hip-Hop Singles (Billboard)	3
US Rhythmic Airplay (Billboard)	40

== Certifications ==
Certifications for Wavy
Region	Certification	Certified units/sales
Canada (Music Canada)	Gold	40,000^{‡}
United Kingdom (BPI)	Silver	200,000^{‡}
United States (RIAA)	Platinum	1,000,000^{‡}
^{‡} Sales+streaming figures based on certification alone.

== Release history ==
Region	Date	Format	Label	Ref.
Worldwide	January 16, 2016	Digital download; streaming	Atlantic	
