= T-Pain Presents Happy Hour: The Greatest Hits =

Greatest hits album by T-Pain
- Released: November 24, 2014
- Recorded: 2004–2014
- Genre: Hip-hop, electro hop
- Length: 53:02
- Label: Nappy Boy, Konvict, RCA

T-Pain chronology
Stoic (2012)	T-Pain Presents Happy Hour: The Greatest Hits (2014)	T-Wayne (2017)

Singles from T-Pain Presents Happy Hour: The Greatest Hits
- 1. "Up Down (Do This All Day)" Released: August 13, 2013; 2. "Drankin' Patna" Released: July 21, 2014

T-Pain Presents Happy Hour: The Greatest Hits is a greatest hits album by American singer T-Pain. It was released on November 24, 2014 on his Nappy Boy record label. The compilation was supported by two singles, "Up Down (Do This All Day)" and "Drankin' Patna".

== Track listing ==
No.	Title	Length
1.	"Up Down (Do This All Day)" (featuring B.o.B)	3:51
2.	"Up Down (Do This All Day) (Remix)" (featuring B.o.B, Boosie Badazz & Kid Ink)	5:00
3.	"Drankin' Patna"	3:55
4.	"Blame It" (Jamie Foxx featuring T-Pain)	4:50
5.	"Buy U a Drank (Shawty Snappin')" (featuring Yung Joc)	3:49
6.	"5 O'Clock" (featuring Lily Allen & Wiz Khalifa)	4:41
7.	"Can't Believe It" (featuring Lil Wayne)	4:33
8.	"Booty Wurk (One Cheek at a Time)" (featuring Joey Galaxy)	3:55
9.	"Best Love Song" (featuring Chris Brown)	3:17
10.	"Bartender" (featuring Akon)	4:01
11.	"I'm 'n Luv (wit a Stripper)" (featuring Mike Jones)	3:46
12.	"I'm Sprung"	3:51
13.	"Freeze" (featuring Chris Brown)	3:36
Total length:		53:02

== Charts ==
=== Weekly charts ===
2014–2025 weekly chart performance for T-Pain Presents Happy Hour: The Greatest Hits
Chart (2014–2025)	Peak position
US Top R&B/Hip-Hop Albums (Billboard)	25

2021 weekly chart performance for T-Pain Presents Happy Hour: The Greatest Hits
Chart (2021)	Peak position
US Billboard 200	181

2024 weekly chart performance for T-Pain Presents Happy Hour: The Greatest Hits
Chart (2024)	Peak position
US Billboard 200	171

=== Year-end charts ===
Year-end chart performance for T-Pain Presents Happy Hour: The Greatest Hits
Chart (2025)	Position
US Top R&B/Hip-Hop Albums (Billboard)	93

== Certifications ==
Region	Certification	Certified units/sales
New Zealand (RMNZ)	Platinum	15,000^{‡}
United Kingdom (BPI)	Gold	100,000^{‡}
^{‡} Sales+streaming figures based on certification alone.
