= My Nigga =

2013 single by YG featuring Jeezy and Rich Homie Quan

Single by YG featuring Jeezy and Rich Homie Quan

from the album My Krazy Life and Boss Yo Life Up Gang
- Released: September 17, 2013
- Recorded: 2013
- Studio: The Blue Room Studios: (Atlanta, Georgia)
- Genre: Hip hop
- Length: 3:56
- Label: Pu$haz Ink; CTE; Def Jam
- Songwriters: Keenon Jackson; Dijon McFarlane; Mikely Adam; Daniel Wall; Jay Jenkins; Dequantes Lamar; Calvin Broadus; Awood Johnson; Craig Lawson; Corey Miller
- Producers: DJ Mustard; Mike Free

YG singles chronology
"Act Right" (2013)	"My Nigga" (2013)	"Left, Right" (2013)

Jeezy singles chronology
"Act Right" (2013)	"My Nigga" (2013)	"Money Can't Buy" (2014)

Rich Homie Quan singles chronology
"Type of Way" (2013)	"My Nigga" (2013)	"I Know" (2013)

"My Nigga," censored as "My Hitta" or "My N*gga," is a song by American rapper YG, released by Def Jam Recordings and CTE World on September 17, 2013, as the lead single from his debut studio album My Krazy Life (2014). The song, produced by frequent collaborator DJ Mustard, features guest appearances from CTE World label boss Jeezy and Atlanta-based rapper Rich Homie Quan. It interpolates "The Sky is the Limit", as written and performed by Lil Wayne as well as the refrain from C-Murder's single "Down for My N's".

YG and Jeezy appeared on MTV's RapFix on September 4, 2013. At the closing of the show, the two premiered the music video for "My Nigga", which had been filmed a month prior in Atlanta, Georgia. On December 3, 2013, YG performed "My Nigga" for the first time on national television, on DJ Skee's SKEE Live on AXS TV. The next month, he performed the song alongside Rich Homie Quan, DJ Mustard and Jeezy on The Arsenio Hall Show. Following the performance, YG was presented with a platinum plaque from the Recording Industry Association of America, commemorating the song's sales of one million units. It has since received quintuple platinum certification.

It was met with generally positive reviews from music critics. XXL and Complex named it one of the best songs of 2013. Many critics also praised the chemistry of the collaborators and the song's minimalistic production. The song peaked at number 19 on the US Billboard Hot 100 and at number 53 on the UK Singles Chart. As of March 16, 2014, the song has sold 1,204,457 copies in the United States according to Nielsen SoundScan.

== Background ==
After YG announced that his debut album would be executive produced by Atlanta rapper Jeezy, the two began frequently collaborating. In June 2013, YG revealed that he had signed to Jeezy's record label CTE World. Prior to the signing announcement "My Nigga" was released as a track on a CTE World EP, #It'sThaWorld. The song was then included on the first official CTE World mixtape, Boss Yo Life Up Gang, which was released in August 2013. Following the music video's release, the song was released by Def Jam as the mixtape's lead single on September 17, 2013.

== Composition ==
"My Nigga" was written by Keenon Jackson, Jay Jenkins, Dequantes Lamar and produced by DJ Mustard and Mikely Adam. It interpolates "The Sky is the Limit", as written and performed by Lil Wayne. The song also interpolates the popular refrain from C-Murder's single "Down 4 My Niggaz". The song is a street anthem that celebrates friendship. Overall its message is that to hang with YG and his crew, "it's a requirement that you don’t trip over potential romantic interests, be averse to snitching, be willing to catch a case when necessary, and just be about getting money."

== Critical reception ==
"My Nigga" was met with generally positive reviews from music critics. Brian Josephs from XXL stated the song, "is still the best song on My Krazy Life, but part of the reason it succeeds represents why the project as a whole is a solid effort. It represents Compton recklessness to the fullest, but that sensibility never comes in the way of relating basic thrills, resulting in an instantly gratifying reward." David Jeffries from AllMusic said the collaborators chemistry is perfect and called the song great overall. Michael Madden of Consequence of Sound called it one of the album's essential tracks saying, the song is "YG sound in miniature" and an instant banger. Jordan Sowunmi of Now called it notably smooth and credited it for fitting perfectly with the cohesion and strong sequencing of My Krazy Life. Jesal 'Jay Soul' Padania of RapReviews said it was an "inescapable street anthem." Dorian Mendoza of PrettyMuchAmazing stated, "the unabashed homie loyalty anthem of the year, serves powerfully as the centerpiece of the album." Jesse Fairfax of HipHopDX called it repetitive and catchy.

Complex ranked "My Nigga" number 30 on their list of the 50 best songs of 2013. They commented saying,

To YG fans, it may have come as a surprise that "My Nigga" took off the way it did. After all, dude had been making comparable if not better and catchier songs with DJ Mustard for years. Somehow though, the stars aligned for this one, and by stars we mean Rich Homie Quan and Young Jeezy. Having catapulted himself to the forefront of catchy-hook stardom with that song about vague emotional responses to jealousy, Quan was able to strike again while the iron was still hot with the "My Nigga" chorus. YG himself switches up his own flow for this one, sing-rapping through his ode to his fellow man. Young Jeezy comes through as the older brother to shine his veteran sense of camaraderie onto the young bucks, and it feels genuine. Having one of Mustard's meanest beats set the didn't hurt, either.

XXL positioned it at number 22 on their list of the best songs of 2013. In February 2014, Complex named it the fifth best song that DJ Mustard had produced.

== Awards and nominations ==
Year	Ceremony	Award	Result
2014	BET Awards 2014	Best Collaboration	Nominated
2014	2014 BET Hip Hop Awards	Best Collabo, Duo or Group	Won
2014	2014 BET Hip Hop Awards	Track of the Year	Won
2014	2014 BET Hip Hop Awards	Best Club Banger	Nominated
2014	2014 BET Hip Hop Awards	People's Champ Award	Nominated

== Chart performance ==
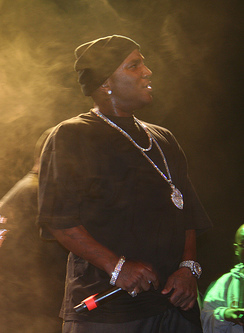
Young Jeezy joined YG during the majority of his television appearances where they performed the song.

"My Nigga" debuted at number 67 on the Billboard Hot 100 the week of October 19, 2013. Six weeks later, it peaked at number 19 on the week of November 30, 2013. It stayed in the Top 30 for fourteen weeks before reaching number 19 again on the week of March 15, 2014. It spent a total of twenty-eight weeks on the chart. As of March 16, 2014, the song has sold 1,204,457 copies in the United States according to Nielsen SoundScan. On December 10, 2020, the single was certified quintuple platinum by the Recording Industry Association of America (RIAA) for combined sales and streaming data of over five million units in the United States.

== Live performances ==
In promotion of the single, YG performed it many times on television and other major venues. On December 3, 2013, YG performed the song for the first time on national television, on DJ Skee's SKEE Live on AXS TV. On January 28, 2014, YG performed "My Nigga" alongside Rich Homie Quan, DJ Mustard and Jeezy on The Arsenio Hall Show. Following the performance, YG was presented with the official platinum plaque from the RIAA commemorating sales of over 1,000,000 copies of the single. YG then performed the song multiple times during SXSW during March 2014. Then on March 19, 2014, YG performed "My Nigga" along with DJ Mustard and Jeezy on Jimmy Kimmel Live!.

== Music video ==
On August 16, 2013, CTE World released the trailer to the music video, shortly after the release of Boss Yo Life Up Gang. On September 4, 2013, YG and Jeezy appeared on MTV's RapFix. During the interview YG announced that his debut album would be titled My Krazy Life, and be released on November 19, 2013. At the closing of the show they premiered the music video for "My Nigga", which had been filmed a month prior in Atlanta, Georgia. As of April 2020, the music video has over 329 million views on YouTube. Kid Ink makes a cameo appearance.

== Remixes ==
On December 27, 2013, Rick Ross and Triple C's Young Breed released a remix to "My Nigga" dubbed as the "Black Bottle Boys MMGMIX". They then released a music video for their remix three days later. On January 12, 2014, Chinx Drugz and Troy Ave released a remix to the song.

On January 22, 2014, the official remix to the song was released, it featured Lil Wayne, Meek Mill, Rich Homie Quan and Nicki Minaj. Five days later, the music video for the remix took place in Los Angeles with YG, Lil Wayne, Meek Mill, Nicki Minaj, and Jeezy among others. The remix was also released as a single for digital download on the same day. On February 20, 2014, YG premiered a preview of the music at a listening session for My Krazy Life. The video featured cameo appearances from Lil Durk, DJ Mustard and Ty Dolla Sign among others. The official remix was included on the deluxe edition of My Krazy Life.

In 2022 Dominican rapper El Alfa released a remix of My Nigga titled “Ma Nigga” which features YG, Braulio Fogon, Almighty, and Dowba Montana.

== Charts ==
=== Weekly charts ===
Weekly chart performance
Chart (2013–2014)	Peak position
Australia (ARIA)	69
Belgium (Ultratip Bubbling Under Flanders)	50
Belgium Urban (Ultratop Flanders)	24
Canada Hot 100 (Billboard)	62
France (SNEP)	106
Sweden (Sverigetopplistan)	50
UK Singles (Official Charts)	53
UK Hip Hop/R&B (Official Charts)	11
US Billboard Hot 100	19
US Hot R&B/Hip-Hop Songs (Billboard)	5
US Rhythmic Airplay (Billboard)	5

=== Year-end charts ===
Annual chart rankings
Chart (2013)	Position
US Hot R&B/Hip-Hop Songs (Billboard)	63
US Hot Rap Songs (Billboard)	44
US Streaming Songs (Billboard)	73

Chart (2014)	Position
US Billboard Hot 100	58
US Hot R&B/Hip-Hop Songs (Billboard)	17
US Rhythmic (Billboard)	30

== Certifications ==
Region	Certification	Certified units/sales
Canada (Music Canada)	Gold	40,000^{*}
Germany (BVMI)	Gold	150,000^{‡}
New Zealand (RMNZ)	2× Platinum	60,000^{‡}
Sweden (GLF)	Platinum	40,000^{‡}
United Kingdom (BPI)	Gold	400,000^{‡}
United States (RIAA)	5× Platinum	5,000,000^{‡}
Streaming
Denmark (IFPI Danmark)	Gold	900,000^{†}
^{*} Sales figures based on certification alone.^{‡} Sales+streaming figures based on certification alone.^{†} Streaming-only figures based on certification alone.

== Release history ==
Country	Date	Format	Label	Version
United States	September 17, 2013	Digital download	Pu$haz Ink; CTE World; Def Jam	Original
United States	October 21, 2013	Mainstream urban radio	Pu$haz Ink; CTE World; Def Jam	Original
United States	November 12, 2013	Rhythmic contemporary radio	Pu$haz Ink; CTE World; Def Jam	Original
United States	January 27, 2014	Digital download	Pu$haz Ink; CTE World; Def Jam	Remix
