= Cold Summer (Mustard album) =

Studio album by Mustard
- Released: September 30, 2016
- Genres: Hip hop; R&B
- Length: 47:00
- Labels: Pu$haz Ink; Roc Nation; Republic
- Producers: DJ Mustard; Cardiak; Christopher Sanders; Focus; J-Holt; Larry Jayy; Rance; Terrace Martin; Twice as Nice

Mustard chronology
| 10 Summers (2014) | Cold Summer (2016) | Perfect Ten (2019) |

Singles from Cold Summer
- 1. "Don't Hurt Me" Released: July 1, 2016; 2. "Want Her" Released: February 28, 2017

Cold Summer is the second studio album by American hip hop producer Mustard. It was released on September 30, 2016, by Pu$haz Ink, Roc Nation and Republic Records. The majority of the album was produced entirely by DJ Mustard himself, and features guest appearances from YG, Ty Dolla Sign, Nipsey Hussle, RJ, Quavo, O.T. Genasis, Jeezy, Rich The Kid, TeeCee4800, K Camp, Nicki Minaj, Jeremih, Young Thug, Meek Mill, Ella Mai, Rick Ross, John Legend and James Fauntleroy.

== Singles ==
The album's lead single, called "Don't Hurt Me" was released on July 1, 2016. The song features guest appearances from Nicki Minaj and Jeremih, with the production that was provided by DJ Mustard and Twice as Nice.

"Want Her" was released on February 28, 2017, as the album's second single. The song features guest appearances from YG and Quavo.

== Track listing ==
| No. | Title | Writer(s) | Producer(s) | Length |
|---|---|---|---|---|
| 1. | "Been a Long Time" (featuring YG and Ty Dolla Sign) | Dijon McFarlane; Nick Audino; Lewis Hughes; Keenon Jackson; Tyrone Griffin, Jr. | DJ Mustard; Twice as Nice | 2:24 |
| 2. | "Ridin' Around" (featuring Nipsey Hussle and RJ) | McFarlane; Ermias Asghedom; Rodney J. Brown, Jr. | DJ Mustard | 3:21 |
| 3. | "Want Her" (featuring Quavo and YG) | McFarlane; Jackson; Quavious Marshall | DJ Mustard | 4:36 |
| 4. | "Dope Boy" (featuring O.T. Genasis and Jeezy) | McFarlane; Larry Jayy; Odis Flores; Jay Jenkins | DJ Mustard; Larry Jayy | 2:17 |
| 5. | "Know My Name" (featuring Rich the Kid and RJ) | McFarlane; Brown, Jr.; Dimitri Roger | DJ Mustard | 3:34 |
| 6. | "Lil Baby" (featuring Ty Dolla Sign) | McFarlane; Griffin, Jr.; Glenda Proby; Larrance Dopson | DJ Mustard; Rance | 4:19 |
| 7. | "Shake That Ass" (featuring TeeCee4800 and K Camp) | McFarlane; Christopher Sanders; Marquise Newman; Kristopher Campbell | DJ Mustard; Christopher Sanders | 2:51 |
| 8. | "Don't Hurt Me" (with Nicki Minaj and Jeremih) | McFarlane; Audino; Hughes; Miles Browne; Christopher Ward; Jeremy Felton; Onika Maraj | DJ Mustard; Twice as Nice | 3:27 |
| 9. | "Party" (featuring Young Thug and YG) | McFarlane; Jackson; Jeffery Williams | DJ Mustard | 3:05 |
| 10. | "Main Bitch" (featuring RJ) | McFarlane; Brown, Jr. | DJ Mustard | 3:24 |
| 11. | "What These Bitches Want" (featuring Meek Mill, Nipsey Hussle and Ty Dolla Sign) | McFarlane; Griffin, Jr.; Asghedom; Robert Williams; Terrace Martin | DJ Mustard; Terrace Martin | 3:09 |
| 12. | "10,000 Hours" (featuring Ella Mai) | Ella Mai; McFarlane; Jordan Holt; Derrus Rachel; Sam Romans | DJ Mustard; J-Holt | 3:09 |
| 13. | "Another Summer" (featuring Rick Ross, John Legend and James Fauntleroy) | McFarlane; Dopson; Bernard Edwards, Jr.; Arin Ray; Carl McCormick; William Roberts II; John Stephens; James Edward Fauntleroy II | DJ Mustard; Rance; Cardiak; Focus | 6:37 |

== Charts ==
| Chart (2016) | Peak position |
|---|---|
| US Heatseekers Albums (Billboard) | 9 |
| US Top R&B/Hip-Hop Albums (Billboard) | 24 |
