= ID Labs production discography =

The following list is the production discography of ID Labs, as well as its individual members

== 1997 ==
Strick Flow – Homegrown

- "Intro"
- "Homegrown"
- "The Classic Pittsburgh Story"
- "Live & DieWrecked"
- "Who U B?"
- "1 Night Stand"
- "The 6 Elements"
- "Fall of 95"
- "Dirt"
- "Mark My Words"
- "Whatsitallabout"
- "It Just Happens"
- "Real Heads Relax"
- "The Equation"
- "Somethin' Like This"
- "Once You Get The Props..."

== 2003 ==
Strict Flow – Without Further Ado

- "Ur Not Ready"
- "Move!"
- "4-1-Too Much"
- "The Genuine Article"
- "Watch Out"
- "Deja Vu"
- "As Good As It Gets" (Featuring Invincible)
- "Who Else?" (E. Dan)
- "Russian Roulette"
- "PAs Finest - Part 1" (featuring Chops)
- "Dont Stop" (featuring SMI)
- "Outflow"
- "Authentic"

== 2004 ==
Chief Kamachi – Cult Status

- "Show Me Proof"
- "The Edge"
- "Queen"
- "Peddlin' Music"
- "Still Searching"

== 2005 ==
Reef The Lost Cauze – Feast Or Famine

- "Crown Of Thorns"
- "I'm Rich"
- "Already Dead"

Chief Kamachi and The Juju Mob – My Squad

== 2006 ==
Wiz Khalifa – Show and Prove

- "Intro"
- "I Choose You"
- "Damn Thing" (produced with Johnny Juliano)
- "I'm Gonna Ride"
- "Let 'Em Know"
- "Sometimes" (featuring Vali Porter) [produced with Champ Super]
- "History in the Making / Never Too Late"

Chief Kamachi – Concreate Gospel

- "24th Elder"
- "Jim Kelly"
- "Death Choir"
- "Love 4 the Craft
- "No Me Now"
- "U Try"
- "777"
- "Little African Boy"
- "Scattered Sermons"
- "Holy Rollers
- "Kamachi"
- "We Still Searching"

== 2007 ==
Wiz Khalifa – Prince of the City 2

- "Intro"
- "Gettin It"
- "Gotta Get It"
- "Chevy (Remix)"
- "I Still Remember"

== 2008 ==
Wiz Khalifa – Say Yeah

- "Say Yeah" (produced with Johnny Juliano)

Wiz Khalifa – Star Power

- "Feels Good"
- "Change Up" (produced with Sledgren)
- "Shawty Wanna Roll"
- "P.W.P" (featuring Chevy Woods)
- "Flickin' Ashes"

== 2009 ==
Wiz Khalifa – Deal or No Deal

- "Bout Y'all (featuring Josh Everette)"
- "Chewy"
- "Hit tha Flo"
- Lose Control
- Take Away
- This Plane

Wiz Khalifa – Flight School

- Teach You To Fly
- Superstar
- Superstar
- Extra Extra Credit

== 2010 ==
Wiz Khalifa – Kush & Orange Juice

- Waken Baken (Big Jerm)
- The Statement (Remix) (E. Dan)
- The Kid Frankie (Big Jerm)
- Good Dank (E. Dan)

Mac Miller – K.I.D.S.

- Outside (Sayez)
- "Paper Route" (featuring Chevy Woods) (Sayez)
- "Knock Knock" (E. Dan)
- "The Spins" (Big Jerm)

== 2011 ==
Snoop Dogg and Wiz Khalifa – Mac & Devin Go to High School

- "OG (featuring Curren$y)"
- "Dev's Song"

Mac Miller – Blue Slide Park

- "Blue Slide Park"
- "Party on Fifth Ave."
- "Frick Park Market"
- "Smile Back"
- "Under the Weather"
- "Of the Soul"
- "Up All Night" (produced with Mac Miller)
- "Loitering" (produced with Young L)
- "Diamonds and Gold"
- "Man in the Hat" (produced with Ritz Reynolds)

Wiz Khalifa – Rolling Papers

- "When I'm Gone"
- "Wake Up" (Big Jerm)
- "The Race"
- "Star of the Show (featuring Chevy Woods)" (E. Dan)
- "No Sleep" (Big Jerm with Benny Blanco)
- "Get Your Shit" (E. Dan)
- "Top Floor" (Big Jerm)
- "Fly Solo" (E. Dan)
- "Rooftops" (feat Curren$y) (Big Jerm
- "Cameras" (E. Dan)

Mac Miller – Best Day Ever

- "Best Day Ever (Intro)"
- "Oy Vey"
- "Wake Up" (produced with SAP)
- "Life Ain’t Easy"
- "Snooze"
- "Keep Floatin’" (featuring Wiz Khalifa)
- "BDE Bonus"

Mac Miller – On and On and Beyond

- "On and On" (produced with Andrew Dawson)
- "Life Ain't Easy"
- "Live Free"

Mac Miller – I Love Life, Thank You

- "Willie Dynamite" (Big Jerm)
- "The Miller Family Reunion" (Big Jerm)
- "Boom Bap Rap (featuring The Come Up)" (Big Jerm, produced with Mac Miller)
- "Just a Kid" (E. Dan)
- "All That (featuring Bun B)" (E. Dan)
- "All This" (E. Dan)

Juicy J – Blue Dream and Lean

- "Real Hustlers Don't Sleep (featuring SpaceGhostPurrp & A$AP Rocky)"

== 2012 ==
Wiz Khalifa – O.N.I.F.C.

- "Paperbond"
- "Let it Go (featuring Akon)" (co-produced with Jo A)
- "The Bluff (featuring Cam'ron)"
- "Got Everything (featuring Courtney Noelle)" (produced with Sledgren and Rykeyz)
- "Time"
- "No Limit" (produced with Nice Rec)
- "The Plan (featuring Juicy J)"

Wiz Khalifa – Taylor Allerdice

- "Amber Ice"
- "The Cruise" (Big Jerm)
- "Rowland (featuring Smoke DZA" (Big Jerm)

Wiz Khalifa – Cabin Fever 2

- "MIA (featuring Juicy J)"
- "Deep Sleep"
- "100 Bottles (featuring Problem)"
- "Thuggin" (featuring Chevy Woods & Lavish)" (produced with Sledgren)
- "Nothin Like the Rest (featuring French Montana)"

Chevy Woods – Gang Land

- "Jacksonville"
- "Circumstances"
- "Two Hundred"

Mac Miller – Macadelic

- "Desperado"
- "Loud" (Big Jerm, Sayez)
- "Vitamins"
- "The Question (feat. Lil Wayne)" (produced with Wally West)
- "Clarity" (produced with Ritz Reynolds)
- "Fuck 'Em All"

Xzibit – Napalm

- "Forever A G" – (feat. Wiz Khalifa)

G. Twilight – FirstTime Felon

- "When The Morning Comes"

== 2013 ==
Freddie Gibbs – ESGN

- "D.O.A. (featuring G-Wiz & Big Kill)" (produced with J Reese)
- "Ten Packs of Backwoods (featuring D-Edge)"
- "Freddie Soprano"

Mac Miller – Watching Movies with the Sound Off

- "Avian"
- "Matches (featuring Ab-Soul)"
- "Someone Like You" (produced with J. Hill)
- "Claymation (featuring Vinny Radio)"

Juicy J – Stay Trippy

- "Talkin' Bout (featuring Chris Brown and Wiz Khalifa)" (produced with SAP and Ritz Reynolds)

Ludacris – #IDGAF

- "She's a Trip (featuring Mac Miller)"

Rockie Fresh – Electric Highway

- "Hold Me Down"

Snow tha Product – Good Nights & Bad Mornings 2: The Hangover

- "Lord Be With You" (produced with Mike Nef)
- "Fuck Your Phone"
- "I'm Doing Fine"
- "Bad Mornings"

Mac Miller – Live from Space

- "Eggs Aisle"
- "Earth (featuring Future)" (produced with Teddy Roxpin)

G. Twilight – Another Detroit Gangster Story

- "So Real"

== 2014 ==
Wiz Khalifa – Blacc Hollywood

- "Hope (featuring Ty Dolla $ign)" (produced with N. Cameron)
- "House in the Hills (featuring Curren$y)" (produced with Sledgren)
- "Still Down (featuring Chevy Woods and Ty Dolla $ign)"
- "No Gain"

Wiz Khalifa – 28 Grams

- "James Bong"
- "What Iss Hittin"
- "My Nigs (featuring Curren$y)"
- "The Rain"

Mac Miller – Faces

- "It Just Doesn't Matter"
- "Therapy"
- "Funeral"
- "Insomniak (featuring Rick Ross)"

== 2015 ==
Mac Miller – GO:OD AM

- "Brand Name" (produced with Thundercat)
- "Rush Hour"
- "100 Grandkids" (produced with Sha Money XL)
- "When in Rome"
- "Ascension"
- "Jump" (produced with Badboxes and DJ Dahi)
- "The Festival (featuring Little Dragon)" (produced with Little Dragon)

Fall Out Boy – Make America Psycho Again

- "Uma Thurman (featuring Wiz Khalifa)" (remix produced with Jake Sinclair, Young Wolf Hatchlings and Badboxes)

Choo Jackson – Broken Hearts Make Money

- "HD" (feat. Mac Miller)

Chevy Woods – The Cookout

- "Cookout"
- "Aunts n Uncles"
- "Invitation"

== 2016 ==
Wiz Khalifa – Khalifa

- "Elevated"
- "Make a Play (featuring J.R. Donato)" (produced with Shod Beatz)
- "Most of Us"
- "Lit (featuring Ty Dolla $ign)" (produced with Jay Card, and Dru Tang)
- "No Permission (featuring Chevy Woods)" (produced with Shod Beatz)
- "iSay (featuring Juicy J)"

Wiz Khalifa – The Hamilton Mixtape

- "Washington's by Your Side"

Mac Miller – The Divine Feminine

- "Stay"
- "Soulmate" (additional production by E. Dan)

== 2017 ==
Rob $tone – Don't Wait For it

- "Lemon Grove"

Your Old Droog – Packs

- "G.K.A.C."

Choo Jackson – Parade

- "Wake Me Up"
- "Right Away"
- "Make You Feel"
- "Holy Water"
- "Dinnertime"
- "Redbull - interlude"
- "Talk"
- "Neighbors"

== 2018 ==
Mac Miller – Swimming

- "Self Care" (produced with DJ Dahi and Nostxlgic)

Wiz Khalifa – Rolling Papers 2

- "Fr Fr"
- "Rolling Papers 2"
- "Late Night Messages"
- "King"
- "Be Ok"
- "Reach For The Stars"

GNAR – Gnar Lif3

- "GRAVE"

Warm Brew – New Content

- "Player Way"
- "Psychedelic"
- "Ricki Lake"
- "When I Can"

Chevy Woods – "81"

- "Off the Porch"

== 2019 ==
Dreamville – Revenge of the Dreamers III

- "Wells Fargo" (with JID and Earthgang feat. Buddy and Guapdad 4000)

Yung Bans – Misunderstood

- "Gang" (produced with TM88)

Wiz Khalifa – Never Lie

- "Never Lie" (feat. Moneybagg Yo)

Wiz Khalifa – Alright

- "Alright" (feat Trippie Redd and Preme)

Lil Xan – Watch Me Fall

- "Watch Me Fall"

Wiz Khalifa – Fly Times Vol. 1: The Good Fly Young

- "G.O.A.T. Flow" (feat. THEMXXNLIGHT)

== 2020 ==
Mac Miller – Circles

- "Woods" (produced with David x Eli and Jon Brion)

Hardo – Days Inn

- "Hurry up & buy" (produced with Christo & Nice Rec)

Wiz Khalifa – The Saga of Wiz Khalifa

- "High Today" (feat. Logic)

Smoke DZA – Worldwide Smoke Session

- "Premium"

Wiz Khalifa

- "The Thrill" (featuring Empire of the Sun (band))

Problem – Coffee & Kush, Vol. 1

- "Janet Freestyle (Remix)"

== 2021 ==
I.D. Labs – Play How You Feel

- "Simplest Thing"
- "The Brace" (co-production feat. Ben Sherman, Claude Flowers, Stuart Bogie)
- "Siti"
- "Silence"
- "Sinnerlude ( co-production feat. Stuart Bogie)
- "Woozy" (co-production feat. Nice Rec)
- "Higher" (co-production feat. J Card)
- "Idekbro"
- "Telemed"
- "Werewolf" (co-production feat. Nice Rec)
- "Fair One" (co-production feat. Nice Rec)
- "Thursday's Dream"

My Favorite Color – Old News

- "Old News"

== 2022 ==
Bocha (rapper)|Bocha – Neck of the Woods

- "Stories" (feat. Donte Thomas & Shelby Swims)

Wiz Khalifa – Multiverse

- "MVP"
- "Thank Him"

== 2023 ==
Chevy Woods

- "Lost Souls"

Wiz Khalifa

- "Peace and Love" (produced with TM88)

Wiz Khalifa

- "Hype Me Up" (produced with TM88)

Wiz Khalifa – See Ya

- "Text Me When You Make It" (produced with Jay Card)
- "Sex When You See Me" (produced with Nostxlgic)
