= Mac Miller discography =

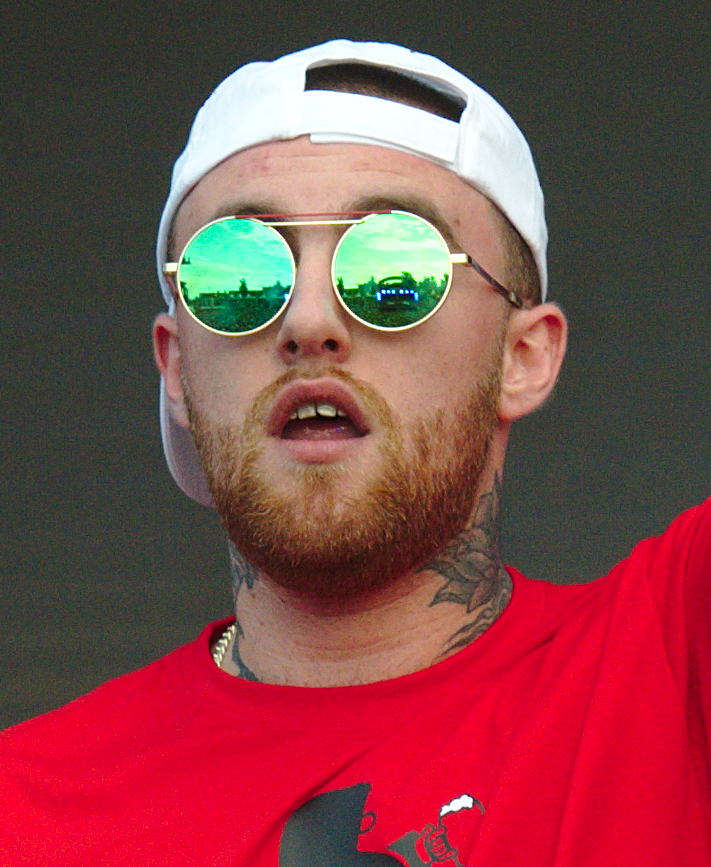
- Miller in 2017
- Studio albums: 7
- Extended plays: 2
- Live albums: 2
- Singles: 46
- Music videos: 63
- Mixtapes: 13

American rapper Mac Miller released seven studio albums, two extended plays, two live albums, thirteen mixtapes, forty-six singles (including fifteen as a featured artist), and sixty-three music videos. After self-releasing several mixtapes, Miller signed with the independent record label Rostrum Records in 2010. He first charted with the release of his debut extended play On and On and Beyond in March 2011, entering the US Billboard 200 at number 55. His single "Donald Trump", from the 2011 mixtape Best Day Ever, became his first singles chart entry, peaking at number 75 on the US Billboard Hot 100, and earned a platinum certification from the Recording Industry Association of America (RIAA).

Miller's debut studio album, Blue Slide Park, topped the Billboard 200 upon its release in November 2011, the first independently distributed debut album to do so since 1995. The album was certified gold in the United States and Canada, and spawned the songs "Smile Back", "Frick Park Market", and "Party on Fifth Ave.", which peaked at number 55, 60, and 64 on the Billboard Hot 100, respectively. "Loud", the lead single from his 2012 mixtape Macadelic, reached number 53 on the Billboard Hot 100. In March 2013, he collaborated with Ariana Grande on her single "The Way"; it attained his highest peak in the United States at number 9, the Netherlands at 22, and the United Kingdom at 41, and was certified 6× platinum by the RIAA. His second studio album, Watching Movies with the Sound Off, released in June 2013 to number three on the Billboard 200.

In 2014, Miller left Rostrum and signed with the major label Warner Bros. Records. His first major label release, GO:OD AM, debuted at number four on the Billboard 200 in September 2015, and was certified platinum in the United States. The single "Weekend", featuring Miguel, became his second song as lead artist to be certified platinum by the RIAA. He followed with the studio albums The Divine Feminine in September 2016, and Swimming in August 2018, which respectively charted at number two and three on the Billboard 200. Miller's death in September 2018 propelled Swimming and its single "Self Care" to his highest peaks at the time in various territories, including "Self Care" at number 33 in the United States.

His sixth studio album, Circles, was released posthumously in January 2020. It debuted at number three in the United States, and reached his highest peaks in Australia, Canada and the Netherlands at number three, the United Kingdom at number eight, and Switzerland at number nine. The single "Good News" became his highest-charting song as lead artist in the United States at number 17, Australia at 27, Canada at 14, New Zealand at 31, and the United Kingdom at 45.

== Albums ==
=== Studio albums ===
List of studio albums, with selected chart positions, sales figures and certifications
Title	Album details	Peak chart positions										Sales	Certifications
Title	Album details	US	AUS	BEL (FL)	CAN	DEN	FRA	NLD	NZ	SWI	UK	Sales	Certifications
Blue Slide Park	Released: November 8, 2011; Label: Rostrum; Format: CD, LP, digital download	1	—	185	8	40	175	—	—	—	143	US: 344,000 (Note: Sales of Blue Slide Park in the United States as of August 12, 2012.)	RIAA: Gold; MC: Gold
Watching Movies with the Sound Off	Released: June 18, 2013; Label: Rostrum; Format: CD, LP, digital download	3	—	82	4	—	—	—	36	42	56	US: 250,000 (Note: Sales of Watching Movies with the Sound Off in the United States as of August 25, 2015.)	RIAA: Gold
GO:OD AM	Released: September 18, 2015; Label: Warner Bros.; Format: CD, LP, digital download	4	32	74	7	—	117	86	29	55	76	US: 92,000 (Note: Sales of GO:OD AM in the United States as of October 14, 2015.)	RIAA: Platinum; RMNZ: Gold
The Divine Feminine	Released: September 16, 2016; Label: Warner Bros.; Format: CD, LP, digital download	2	13	38	6	—	64	30	17	35	59	US: 32,000 (Note: Sales of The Divine Feminine in the United States as of September 22, 2016.)	RIAA: Platinum; BPI: Silver; RMNZ: Platinum
Swimming	Released: August 3, 2018; Label: Warner Bros.; Format: CD, LP, digital download	3	7	15	4	13	42	9	7	23	17	US: 30,000 (Note: Sales of Swimming in the United States as of August 9, 2018.)	RIAA: 2× Platinum; BPI: Gold; IFPI DEN: Gold; RMNZ: 2× Platinum
Circles	Released: January 17, 2020; Label: Warner; Format: CD, LP, digital download	3	3	4	3	10	37	3	3	9	8	US: 61,000 (Note: Sales of Circles in the United States as of January 23, 2020.)	RIAA: Platinum; BPI: Gold; IFPI DEN: Gold; RMNZ: Platinum
Balloonerism	Released: January 17, 2025; Label: Warner; Format: CD, LP, digital download	3	12	1	5	10	—	3	3	6	16		
"—" denotes a recording that did not chart or was not released in that territory.

=== Live albums ===
List of live albums, with selected chart positions
Title	Album details	Peak
Title	Album details	US R&B /HH
Live from Space	Released: December 17, 2013; Label: Rostrum; Format: Digital download	23
Spotify Singles	Released: November 28, 2018; Label: Warner Bros.; Format: Streaming, LP	—
NPR Music Tiny Desk Concert	Released August 3, 2023 (UK); Label: Warner Bros.; Format: Limited edition coloured vinyl	—
"—" denotes a recording that did not chart or was not released in that territory.

=== Mixtapes ===
List of mixtapes, with selected chart positions
Title	Album details	Peak chart positions					Sales	Certifications
Title	Album details	US	US R&B /HH	AUS	BEL (FL)	CAN	Sales	Certifications
But My Mackin' Ain't Easy (as Easy Mac)	Released: 2007; Label: Self-released; Format: Digital download	—	—	—	—	—		
How High (with Beedie as part of The Ill Spoken)	Released: October 27, 2008; Label: Self-released; Format: Digital download	—	—	—	—	—		
The Jukebox: Prelude to Class Clown	Released: June 1, 2009; Label: Self-released; Format: Digital download	—	—	—	—	—		
The High Life	Released: December 1, 2009; Label: Self-released; Format: Digital download	—	—	—	—	—		
K.I.D.S.	Released: August 13, 2010; Label: Rostrum; Format: CD, LP, digital download	62	—	—	—	—		RMNZ: Platinum
Best Day Ever	Released: March 11, 2011; Label: Rostrum; Format: CD, LP, digital download	26	17	—	147	41		
I Love Life, Thank You	Released: October 14, 2011; Label: Self-released; Format: Digital download	22	12	—	—	46		RMNZ: Gold
Macadelic	Released: March 23, 2012; Label: Rostrum; Format: LP, Digital download	61	30	—	—	—		
Run-On Sentences: Vol. 1 (as Larry Fisherman)	Released: March 4, 2013; Label: Self-released; Format: Digital download	—	—	—	—	—		
Stolen Youth (as Larry Fisherman; with Vince Staples)	Released: June 20, 2013; Label: Self-released; Format: Digital download	—	—	—	—	—		
Delusional Thomas (as Delusional Thomas)	Released: October 31, 2013; Label: Self-released; Format: Digital download	—	—	—	—	—		
Faces	Released: May 11, 2014; Label: Self-released (Note: Faces was re-released by Warner Records in 2021.); Format: LP, digital download	3	3	16	33	5	US: 34,000 (Note: Sales of Faces in the United States as of October 21, 2021.)	
Run-On Sentences: Vol. 2 (as Larry Fisherman)	Released: December 29, 2015; Label: Self-released; Format: Digital download	—	—	—	—	—		
"—" denotes a recording that did not chart or was not released in that territory.

=== Box sets ===
List of box sets
Title	Album details	Peak chart positions	Notes
Title	Album details	AUS	Notes
Swimming in Circles	Released: December 18, 2020; Label: Warner; Format: LP	70	A box set which features two limited Swimming and Circles records, alongside a poster, a lyrics sheet, and a booklet, which features pictures of Miller during the creation of both albums.

== Extended plays ==
List of extended plays, with selected chart positions and sales figures
Title	EP details	Peak chart positions			Sales
Title	EP details	US	US R&B /HH	US Jazz	Sales
On and On and Beyond	Released: March 29, 2011; Label: Rostrum; Format: Digital download	55	15	—	US: 54,000 (Note: Sales of On and On and Beyond in the United States as of November 4, 2011.)
You (as Larry Lovestein & the Velvet Revival)	Released: November 21, 2012; Label: Self-released (Note: You was re-released by Rostrum Records in 2023.); Format: LP, digital download	197	—	16	
"—" denotes a recording that did not chart or was not released in that territory.

== Singles ==
=== As lead artist ===
List of singles as lead artist, with selected chart positions and certifications, showing year released and album name
Title	Year	Peak chart positions										Certifications	Album
Title	Year	US	US R&B /HH	AUS	BEL (FL) Tip	CAN	FRA	NLD	NZ	SWI	UK	Certifications	Album
"Nike's on My Feet"	2010	—	—	—	—	—	—	—	—	—	—	RMNZ: Platinum	K.I.D.S.
"Kool Aid & Frozen Pizza"	2010	—	—	—	—	—	—	—	—	—	—	RIAA: Gold; RMNZ: Gold	K.I.D.S.
"Knock Knock"	2010	88	—	—	—	71	—	—	—	—	—	RIAA: Platinum; RMNZ: Gold	K.I.D.S.
"Senior Skip Day"	2010	—	—	—	—	—	—	—	—	—	—		K.I.D.S.
"On and On"	2011	—	—	—	—	—	—	—	—	—	—		On and On and Beyond
"Donald Trump"	2011	75	—	—	—	—	110	—	—	—	—	RIAA: Platinum; IFPI DEN: Gold; RMNZ: Platinum	Best Day Ever
"Frick Park Market"	2011	60	—	—	—	—	—	—	—	—	—	RIAA: Gold	Blue Slide Park
"Party on Fifth Ave."	2011	64	— (Note: "Party on Fifth Ave." did not enter the Hot R&B/Hip-Hop Songs chart, but peaked at number 19 on the Bubbling Under R&B/Hip-Hop Singles chart.)	—	—	—	—	—	—	—	—	RIAA: Gold	Blue Slide Park
"Up All Night"	2011	— (Note: "Up All Night" did not enter the Billboard Hot 100, but peaked at number 23 on the Bubbling Under Hot 100 Singles chart.)	—	—	—	—	—	—	—	—	—		Blue Slide Park
"Loud"	2012	53	— (Note: "Loud" did not enter the Hot R&B/Hip-Hop Songs chart, but peaked at number five on the Bubbling Under R&B/Hip-Hop Singles chart.)	—	—	71	—	—	—	—	—	RIAA: Platinum	Macadelic
"Lucky Ass Bitch" (featuring Juicy J)	2013	—	—	—	—	—	—	—	—	—	—		Macadelic
"S.D.S."	2013	— (Note: "S.D.S." did not enter the Billboard Hot 100, but peaked at number nine on the Bubbling Under Hot 100 Singles chart.)	41	—	74	—	—	—	—	—	—		Watching Movies with the Sound Off
"Watching Movies"	2013	— (Note: "Watching Movies" did not enter the Billboard Hot 100, but peaked at number seven on the Bubbling Under Hot 100 Singles chart.)	33	—	—	—	—	—	—	—	—	RIAA: Gold	Watching Movies with the Sound Off
"Diablo"	2014	—	—	—	—	—	—	—	—	—	—		Faces
"100 Grandkids"	2015	100	28	—	25	—	—	—	—	—	—	RIAA: Platinum	GO:OD AM
"Break the Law"	2015	—	—	—	—	—	—	—	—	—	—		GO:OD AM
"Clubhouse"	2015	—	—	—	—	—	—	—	—	—	—	RIAA: Gold	GO:OD AM
"Weekend" (featuring Miguel)	2016	— (Note: "Weekend" did not enter the Billboard Hot 100, but peaked at number 25 on the Bubbling Under Hot 100 Singles chart.)	46	—	—	—	—	—	—	—	—	RIAA: 5× Platinum; BPI: Silver; RMNZ: 3× Platinum	GO:OD AM
"Dang!" (featuring Anderson Paak)	2016	— (Note: "Dang!" did not enter the Billboard Hot 100, but peaked at number seven on the Bubbling Under Hot 100 Singles chart.)	45	95	3	—	76	—	—	—	—	RIAA: 2× Platinum; BPI: Silver; IFPI DEN: Gold; RMNZ: 2× Platinum	The Divine Feminine
"We" (featuring CeeLo Green)	2016	—	—	—	—	—	—	—	—	—	—		The Divine Feminine
"My Favorite Part" (featuring Ariana Grande)	2016	—	— (Note: "My Favorite Part" did not enter the Hot R&B/Hip-Hop Songs chart, but peaked at number two on the Bubbling Under R&B/Hip-Hop Singles chart.)	—	—	—	—	—	—	—	—	RIAA: Platinum; BPI: Silver; RMNZ: Platinum	The Divine Feminine
"Buttons"	2018	—	—	—	—	—	—	—	—	—	—		Non-album singles
"Programs"	2018	—	—	—	—	—	—	—	—	—	—	RIAA: Gold	Non-album singles
"Small Worlds"	2018	—	—	—	—	—	—	—	—	—	—	RIAA: 2× Platinum; BPI: Silver; RMNZ: Platinum	Swimming
"Self Care"	2018	33	18	83	—	38	—	—	— (Note: "Self Care" did not enter the NZ Top 40 Singles Chart, but peaked at number five on the NZ Hot Singles Chart.)	—	61	RIAA: 6× Platinum; BPI: Gold; RMNZ: 2× Platinum	Swimming
"What's the Use?"	2018	— (Note: "What's the Use?" did not enter the Billboard Hot 100, but peaked at number eight on the Bubbling Under Hot 100 Singles chart.)	— (Note: "What's the Use?" did not enter the Hot R&B/Hip-Hop Songs chart, but peaked at number two on the Bubbling Under R&B/Hip-Hop Singles chart.)	—	—	—	—	—	—	—	—	RIAA: Platinum; BPI: Silver; RMNZ: Platinum	Swimming
"Time" (with Free Nationals and Kali Uchis)	2019	—	—	—	—	—	—	—	— (Note: "Time" did not enter the NZ Top 40 Singles Chart, but peaked at number 22 on the NZ Hot Singles Chart.)	—	—	RIAA: Gold; RMNZ: Gold	Free Nationals
"Good News"	2020	17	10	27	1	14	128	41	17	43	45	RIAA: 2× Platinum; BPI: Silver; RMNZ: Platinum	Circles
"Blue World"	2020	38	22	72	—	57	—	89	— (Note: "Blue World" did not enter the NZ Top 40 Singles Chart, but peaked at number six on the NZ Hot Singles Chart.)	—	84	RIAA: Platinum; BPI: Silver; RMNZ: Platinum	Circles
"5 Dollar Pony Rides"	2025	85	19	—	—	91	—	—	— (Note: "5 Dollar Pony Rides" did not enter the NZ Top 40 Singles Chart, but peaked at number eight on the NZ Hot Singles Chart.)	—	—		Balloonerism
"Funny Papers"	2025	77	16	—	—	68	—	—	— (Note: "Funny Papers" did not enter the NZ Top 40 Singles Chart, but peaked at number two on the NZ Hot Singles Chart.)	—	—		Balloonerism
"Butterflies"	2026	—	39	—	—	—	—	—	— (Note: "Butterflies" did not enter the NZ Top 40 Singles Chart, but peaked at number 9 on the NZ Hot Singles Chart.)	—	—		The Divine Feminine (10th Anniversary Edition)
"—" denotes a recording that did not chart or was not released in that territory.

=== As featured artist ===
List of singles as featured artist, with selected chart positions and certifications, showing year released and album name
Title	Year	Peak chart positions										Certifications	Album
Title	Year	US	US Pop	AUS	BEL (FL) Tip	CAN	IRE	JPN	NLD	NZ	UK	Certifications	Album
"I'm V.I.P." (Consequence featuring Diggy Simmons and Mac Miller)	2010	—	—	—	—	—	—	—	—	—	—		Movies on Demand 2
"Beautiful Money" (Moola Gang featuring Mac Miller)	2011	—	—	—	—	—	—	—	—	—	—		Knock Knock
"82 92" (Statik Selektah and Termanology featuring Mac Miller)	2011	—	—	—	—	—	—	—	—	—	—		Non-album single
"Groupie Love" (Statik Selektah featuring Mac Miller and Josh Xantus)	2011	—	—	—	—	—	—	—	—	—	—		Population Control
"Middle Finger" (Cobra Starship featuring Mac Miller)	2011	— (Note: "Middle Finger" did not enter the Billboard Hot 100, but peaked at number 14 on the Bubbling Under Hot 100 Singles chart.)	36	—	—	55	—	80	—	—	—		Night Shades
"Moves like Jagger" (Remix) (Maroon 5 featuring Christina Aguilera and Mac Miller)	2011	—	—	—	—	—	—	—	—	—	—		Non-album single
"Happy Days" (Statik Selektah and Termanology featuring Mac Miller, Bun B and Shawn Stockman)	2012	—	—	—	—	—	—	—	—	—	—		2012
"Black Acura" (Pac Div featuring Mac Miller)	2012	—	—	—	—	—	—	—	—	—	—		GMB
"The Way" (Ariana Grande featuring Mac Miller)	2013	9	12	37	58	33	51	66	22	31	41	RIAA: 6× Platinum; ARIA: 2× Platinum; BPI: Gold; MC: Platinum; RMNZ: 2× Platinum	Yours Truly
"21 & Over" (Statik Selektah featuring Mac Miller and Sean Price)	2013	—	—	—	—	—	—	—	—	—	—		Extended Play
"Into You" (Alex Ghenea Remix) (Ariana Grande featuring Mac Miller)	2016	—	—	—	—	—	—	—	—	—	—		Christmas & Chill (Japan version)
"Learn How to Watch" (Carnage featuring Mac Miller and MadeinTYO)	2018	—	—	—	—	—	—	—	—	—	—		Battered Bruised & Bloody
"That's Life" (88-Keys featuring Mac Miller and Sia)	2019	—	—	—	—	—	—	—	—	—	—		Non-album single
"I Believed It" (Dvsn and Ty Dolla Sign featuring Mac Miller)	2021	—	—	—	—	97	—	—	—	—	—		Cheers to the Best Memories
"Therapy pt. 2" (Robert Glasper featuring Mac Miller)	2022	—	—	—	—	—	—	—	—	—	—		Black Radio III (Supreme Edition)
"Forever" (Big L featuring Mac Miller and Pale Jay)	2025	—	—	—	—	—	—	—	—	—	—		Harlem's Finest: Return of the King
"She Knows Too Much" (Thundercat featuring Mac Miller)	2026	—	—	—	—	—	—	—	—	— (Note: "She Knows Too Much" did not enter the NZ Top 40 Singles Chart, but peaked at number 20 on the NZ Hot Singles Chart.)	—		Distracted
"—" denotes a recording that did not chart or was not released in the territory.

== Other charted and certified songs ==
List of other charted and certified songs, with selected chart positions, showing year charted and album name
Title	Year	Peak chart positions									Certifications	Album
Title	Year	US	US R&B /HH	AUS	BEL (WA) Tip	CAN	NLD	NZ Hot	UK	WW	Certifications	Album
"The Spins" (with Empire of the Sun)	2010	—	—	—	—	—	— (Note: "The Spins" did not enter the Dutch Single Top 100 chart, but peaked at number four on the Single Tip chart.)	—	—	175	RIAA: Gold; BPI: Gold; RMNZ: 4× Platinum	K.I.D.S.
"Smile Back"	2011	55	—	—	—	—	—	—	—	—		Blue Slide Park
"Goosebumpz"	2013	— (Note: "Goosebumpz" did not enter the Billboard Hot 100, but peaked at number 21 on the Bubbling Under Hot 100 Singles chart.)	43	—	—	—	—	—	—	—		Watching Movies with the Sound Off
"O.K." (featuring Tyler, the Creator)	2013	—	— (Note: "O.K." did not enter the Hot R&B/Hip-Hop Songs chart, but peaked at number seven on the Bubbling Under R&B/Hip-Hop Singles chart.)	—	—	—	—	—	—	—		Watching Movies with the Sound Off
"Objects in the Mirror"	2013	—	—	—	—	—	—	—	—	—	RIAA: Gold	Watching Movies with the Sound Off
"Brand Name"	2015	—	—	—	—	—	—	—	—	—	RIAA: Gold	GO:OD AM
"Rush Hour"	2015	—	—	—	—	—	—	—	—	—	RIAA: Gold	GO:OD AM
"ROS"	2015	—	—	—	—	—	—	—	—	—	RIAA: Gold	GO:OD AM
"Ascension"	2015	—	—	—	—	—	—	—	—	—	RIAA: Gold	GO:OD AM
"Cinderella" (featuring Ty Dolla Sign)	2016	25	6	16	—	29	85	—	21	46	RIAA: Platinum; BPI: Silver; RMNZ: Platinum	The Divine Feminine
"Congratulations" (featuring Bilal)	2016	—	—	—	—	—	—	—	—	—	RIAA: Platinum; BPI: Silver; RMNZ: Gold	The Divine Feminine
"Stay"	2016	—	—	—	—	—	—	—	—	—	RIAA: Gold; RMNZ: Gold	The Divine Feminine
"Soulmate"	2016	—	—	—	—	—	—	—	—	—	RIAA: Gold	The Divine Feminine
"God Is Fair, Sexy Nasty" (featuring Kendrick Lamar)	2016	—	—	—	—	—	—	—	—	—	RIAA: Gold	The Divine Feminine
"Come Back to Earth"	2018	91	41	—	—	—	—	8	—	—	RIAA: 2× Platinum; BPI: Silver; RMNZ: Platinum	Swimming
"Hurt Feelings"	2018	70	29	—	—	74	—	7	99	—	RIAA: Platinum; RMNZ: Gold	Swimming
"Perfecto"	2018	—	—	—	—	—	—	—	—	—	RIAA: Gold	Swimming
"Wings"	2018	—	—	—	—	—	—	—	—	—	RIAA: Platinum; RMNZ: Gold	Swimming
"Ladders"	2018	— (Note: "Ladders" did not enter the Billboard Hot 100, but peaked at number two on the Bubbling Under Hot 100 Singles chart.)	50	—	25	—	—	6	—	—	RIAA: Platinum; RMNZ: Platinum	Swimming
"Conversation Pt. 1"	2018	—	—	—	—	—	—	—	—	—	RIAA: Gold	Swimming
"Dunno"	2018	—	—	—	—	—	—	—	—	—	RIAA: Gold; RMNZ: Gold	Swimming
"Jet Fuel"	2018	—	—	—	—	—	—	—	—	—	RIAA: Platinum; RMNZ: Gold	Swimming
"2009"	2018	— (Note: "2009" did not enter the Billboard Hot 100, but peaked at number one on the Bubbling Under Hot 100 Singles chart.)	49	—	—	—	—	—	—	—	RIAA: Platinum; RMNZ: Gold	Swimming
"So It Goes"	2018	—	—	—	—	—	—	—	—	—	RIAA: Gold	Swimming
"Circles"	2020	48	—	94	—	55	94	8	85	—	RIAA: Platinum; RMNZ: Gold	Circles
"Complicated"	2020	63	—	—	—	76	—	10	—	—	RIAA: Gold	Circles
"I Can See"	2020	68	32	—	—	77	—	—	—	—	RIAA: Gold	Circles
"Hand Me Downs"	2020	64	—	—	—	72	—	11	—	—	RIAA: Gold; RMNZ: Gold	Circles
"Everybody"	2020	80	—	—	—	86	—	—	—	—	RIAA: Gold	Circles
"Woods"	2020	75	—	—	—	88	—	—	—	—	RIAA: Gold; RMNZ: Gold	Circles
"That's on Me"	2020	100	—	—	—	—	—	—	—	—		Circles
"Hands"	2020	— (Note: "Hands" did not enter the Billboard Hot 100, but peaked at number eight on the Bubbling Under Hot 100 chart.)	—	—	—	—	—	—	—	—		Circles
"Surf"	2020	91	—	—	—	—	—	—	—	—	RIAA: Gold; RMNZ: Gold	Circles
"Once a Day"	2020	— (Note: "Once a Day" did not enter the Billboard Hot 100, but peaked at number four on the Bubbling Under Hot 100 chart.)	—	—	—	—	—	—	—	—		Circles
"Right"	2020	—	—	—	—	—	—	34	—	—		Circles
"Inside Outside"	2021	—	—	—	—	—	—	36	—	—		Faces
"Here We Go"	2021	— (Note: "Here We Go" did not enter the Billboard Hot 100, but peaked at number 11 on the Bubbling Under Hot 100 chart.)	—	—	—	—	—	23	—	—		Faces
"Friends" (featuring Schoolboy Q)	2021	—	—	—	—	—	—	38	—	—		Faces
"Colors and Shapes"	2021	—	—	—	—	—	—	32	—	—		Faces
"Day Before" (with Young Thug)	2021	— (Note: "Day Before" did not enter the Billboard Hot 100, but peaked at number seven on the Bubbling Under Hot 100 chart.)	48	—	—	—	—	—	—	—		Punk
"I Love Life, Thank You"	2022	—	—	—	—	—	—	19	—	—		I Love Life, Thank You
"People Under the Stairs"	2022	—	—	—	—	—	—	29	—	—		I Love Life, Thank You
"The Scoop on Heaven"	2022	—	—	—	—	—	—	33	—	—		I Love Life, Thank You
"Love Lost"	2022	91	22	28	—	75	— (Note: "Love Lost" did not enter the Dutch Single Top 100, but peaked at number 20 on the Single Tip chart.)	5	—	180	BPI: Silver; RMNZ: 2× Platinum	I Love Life, Thank You
"The Star Room" (OG Version) (with Earl Sweatshirt)	2023	—	—	—	—	—	—	39	—	—		Watching Movies with the Sound Off (10th Anniversary)
"DJ's Chord Organ" (featuring SZA)	2025	95	23	—	—	—	—	3	—	—		Balloonerism
"Do You Have a Destination?"	2025	— (Note: "Do You Have a Destination?" did not enter the Billboard Hot 100, but peaked at number four on the Bubbling Under Hot 100 Singles chart.)	31	—	—	—	—	7	—	—		Balloonerism
"Friendly Hallucinations"	2025	— (Note: "Friendly Hallucinations" did not enter the Billboard Hot 100, but peaked at number 11 on the Bubbling Under Hot 100 Singles chart.)	38	—	—	—	—	—	—	—		Balloonerism
"Mrs. Deborah Downer"	2025	— (Note: "Mrs. Debroah Downer" did not enter the Billboard Hot 100, but peaked at number 23 on the Bubbling Under Hot 100 Singles chart.)	50	—	—	—	—	—	—	—		Balloonerism
"Stoned"	2025	97	25	—	—	—	—	6	—	—		Balloonerism
"Channel 13"	2026	—	44	—	—	—	—	—	—	—		The Divine Feminine (10th Anniversary)
"—" denotes a recording that did not chart or was not released in the territory.

== Music videos ==
=== As lead artist ===
List of music videos as lead artist, showing year released and director
Title	Year	Director(s)
"Get It on the Floor" (Remix)	2009	Unknown
"On Some Real Shit (100,000 Bars)"	2009	Unknown
"Cruisin'"	2009	Ian Wolfson (Note: Ian Wolfson is sometimes credited under his production banner, Rex Arrow Films.)
"Got a Clue"	2009	Ian Wolfson
"Ladies and Gentlemen"	2009	Unknown
"Snap Back"	2009	Brandon Dull
"Live Free"	2009	Ian Wolfson
"Another Night"	2010	Ian Wolfson
"Nikes on My Feet"	2010	Ian Wolfson
"La La La La"	2010	Dan Meyers
"Kool Aid & Frozen Pizza"	2010	Ian Wolfson
"Don't Mind If I Do"	2010	Ian Wolfson
"Senior Skip Day"	2010	Ian Wolfson
"Knock Knock"	2010	Ian Wolfson
"Donald Trump"	2011	Ian Wolfson
"Get Up!"	2011	Ian Wolfson
"Wear My Hat"	2011	Ian Wolfson
"Best Day Ever"	2011	Ian Wolfson
"Frick Park Market"	2011	Ian Wolfson
"Smile Back"	2011	Ian Wolfson
"Party on Fifth Ave."	2011	Ian Wolfson
"Of the Soul"	2012	Ian Wolfson
"Loud"	2012	Ian Wolfson
"Thoughts from a Balcony"	2012	Mac Miller and Justin Boyd
"Clarity"	2012	Ian Wolfson and Mac Miller
"Missed Calls"	2012	Ian Wolfson
"America" (featuring Casey Veggies and Joey Badass)	2012	Mike Waxx and Mike Carson
"He Who Ate All the Caviar"	2012	Ian Wolfson
"One Last Thing"	2012	Ian Wolfson
"S.D.S."	2013	Ian Wolfson
"Objects in the Mirror"	2013	Ian Wolfson
"Watching Movies"	2013	Ian Wolfson and Mac Miller (Note: Miller is credited under the pseudonym Larry Fisherman.)
"Gees" (featuring Schoolboy Q)	2013	Illroots
"I Am Who Am (Killin' Time)" (featuring Niki Randa)	2013	Ian Wolfson
"The Star Room" (featuring Delusional Thomas)	2013	Ian Wolfson
"Youforia"	2013	Ian Wolfson
"Avian"	2014	Ian Wolfson
"Diablo"	2014	Ian Wolfson
"100 Grandkids"	2015	Nick Walker
"Brand Name"	2015	Mac Miller and Ian Wolfson
"Clubhouse"	2015	Eavvon O'Neal
"Weekend" (featuring Miguel)	2016	Daniel Czernilofsky
"Dang!" (featuring Anderson Paak)	2016	Ian Wolfson
"Stay"	2016	oneday
"My Favorite Part" (featuring Ariana Grande)	2016	_p
"Cinderella" (featuring Ty Dolla Sign)	2017	Bo Mirosseni
"Self Care"	2018	Christian Weber
"Inertia"	2018	Sam Balaban
"Come Back to Earth"	2018	Unknown
"Good News"	2020	Anthony Gaddis and Eric Tilford
"Colors and Shapes"	2021	Sam Mason

=== As featured artist ===
List of music videos as featured artist, showing year released and director
Title	Year	Director(s)
"Always Been" (Smoke DZA featuring Mac Miller)	2011	Tony Billz and Steve-Ography
"82 92" (Statik Selektah and Termanology featuring Mac Miller)	2011	Jon Wolf
"Extra Extra" (Rapsody featuring Mac Miller)	2011	Kenneth Price
"Around the World" (Boaz featuring Mac Miller and Josh Everette)	2011	Dan Meyers
"Middle Finger" (Cobra Starship featuring Mac Miller)	2012	Luga Podesta
"Great" (Sir Michael Rocks featuring Mac Miller and Casey Veggies)	2012	The Topshelf Company
"Strip Show" (The Come Up featuring Mac Miller)	2012	Ian Wolfson
"Black Acura" (Pac Div featuring Mac Miller)	2013	Austin Winchell
"The Way" (Ariana Grande featuring Mac Miller)	2013	Jones Crow
"21 & Over" (Statik Selektah featuring Mac Miller and Sean Price)	2013	Guy Blelloch
"Came Thru/Easily" (Chuck Inglish featuring Ab-Soul and Mac Miller)	2013	Trevor Kane
"Learn How to Watch" (Carnage featuring Mac Miller and MadeinTYO)	2018	Cole Bennett
