= Macadelic =

Mixtape by Mac Miller
- Released: March 23, 2012
- Recorded: 2011
- Studios: Rostrum Records Studio; ID Labs Studio (Pittsburgh, Pennsylvania)
- Genre: Psychedelic hip-hop
- Length: 64:40
- Label: Rostrum
- Producers: Ritz Reynolds; ID Labs; SAP; Brandun DeShay; Iman Omari; Lex Luger; Two Fresh; Black Diamond; Cardo; Clams Casino; Teddy Roxpin; Hannibal King

Mac Miller chronology
Blue Slide Park (2011)	Macadelic (2012)	Watching Movies with the Sound Off (2013)

Macadelic is the seventh mixtape by American rapper Mac Miller. It was released online via free digital download on March 23, 2012. It includes the hit single "Loud". Miller went on The Macadelic Tour in support of the mixtape in early 2012, performing 18 shows in the United States and 3 in Europe. Since its release, it has been downloaded over 1.3 million times and streamed over 1.5 million times from its official host, DatPiff. Macadelic was remastered and commercially released on May 4, 2018.

== Overview ==
After the release of Blue Slide Park and I Love Life, Thank You in 2011, Mac Miller began working on another project. According to Miller, he decided to "stop thinking about what kind of music [he] should make and just start saying what [he] wanted to say." On March 23, 2012 Mac Miller released Macadelic and had a release party at Shadow Lounge in Pittsburgh, Pennsylvania. The music video for "Loud" was also released that day.

Mac Miller's lyrical focus and subject is different from that of his previous major mixtape Best Day Ever. Also, the instrumentals on the songs have a psychedelic influence to the typical hip-hop beat. While most songs' lyrics are rapped, hit songs such as "Clarity", "Angels (When She Shuts Her Eyes)", and "The Question" featuring Lil Wayne are performed in a more poetic way. "Desperado" ends with the introduction to "Lucy in the Sky with Diamonds" by the Beatles. Another feature of Macadelic was its numerous cosigns and guest features. Mac Miller performed alongside Kendrick Lamar, Lil Wayne, Joey Bada$$, Sir Michael Rocks of The Cool Kids, Cam'ron, and Juicy J among others. Some of the more popular songs from the mixtape are "Loud", "Thoughts From a Balcony", "Clarity", "Lucky Ass Bitch", "Angels (When She Shuts Her Eyes)", and "The Question".

== Production ==
ID Labs produced several tracks on Macadelic as they did with previous Mac Miller projects. However, Macadelic introduces several new producers to Mac Miller such as Wally West who produced "The Question" featuring Lil Wayne. SAP, who produced Mac Miller's hit "Donald Trump" produced his song "Thoughts From a Balcony" which was later released as a music video. Iman Omari who was featured on "Fight the Feeling" along with Kendrick Lamar and "Sunlight" produced "Fight the Feeling". Several other new producers worked on Macadelic as well. The song "1 Threw 8" features a sample from The xx song "Fantasy". Teddy Roxpin, who previously worked with Mac Miller on "Get Up" and "Futuristic Funk", produced "Sunlight".

== Accolades ==
The album was named the 50th best album of 2012 by Complex.

== Commercial performance ==
Following Mac Miller's death on September 7, 2018, Macadelic debuted at number 106 on the US Billboard 200 with 8,000 album-equivalent units.

== Track listing ==
Macadelic track listing
No.	Title	Writer(s)	Producer(s)	Length
1.	"Love Me as I Have Loved You"	Malcolm McCormick	Ritz Reynolds	1:15
2.	"Desperado"	McCormick	ID Labs	4:00
3.	"Loud"	Eric Dan; Jeremy Kulousek; McCormick; Zachary Vaughan	ID Labs	3:01
4.	"Thoughts from a Balcony"	Adrian Lim-Klumpes; David Bowman; Jonathan King; Laurence Pike; McCormick; Neal Sutherland; Richard Pike	Sap	3:06
5.	"Aliens Fighting Robots" (featuring Sir Michael Rocks)	McCormick	Brandun DeShay	4:40
6.	"Vitamins"	McCormick	ID Labs	3:43
7.	"Fight the Feeling" (featuring Kendrick Lamar and Iman Omari)	McCormick	Iman Omari	5:02
8.	"Lucky Ass Bitch" (featuring Juicy J)	Greg Kurstin; Inara George; Lexus Lewis; McCormick	Lex Luger	4:18
9.	"The Mourning After"	McCormick	Two Fresh	3:08
10.	"1 Threw 8"	McCormick	Black Diamond	3:57
11.	"Ignorant" (featuring Cam'ron)	McCormick	Cardo	3:33
12.	"The Question" (featuring Lil Wayne)	Dan; Gairy Harris; Kulousek; McCormick; Vaughan	Wally West; ID Labs	5:54
13.	"Angels (When She Shuts Her Eyes)"	McCormick	Clams Casino	3:23
14.	"Sunlight" (featuring Iman Omari)	McCormick	Teddy Roxpin	3:09
15.	"Clarity"	Brent Reynolds; Dan; Kulousek; McCormick; Vaughan	ID Labs; Ritz Reynolds	4:35
16.	"America" (featuring Casey Veggies and Joey Badass)	McCormick	Hannibal King	4:33
17.	"Fuck 'Em All"	McCormick	ID Labs	4:23

== Charts ==
Chart performance for Macadelic
Chart (2018–2022)	Peak position
UK R&B Albums (Official Charts)	13
US Billboard 200	61
US Independent Albums (Billboard)	10
US Top R&B/Hip-Hop Albums (Billboard)	30
