= Let It Go (Wiz Khalifa song) =

Song by Wiz Khalifa featuring Akon

from the album O.N.I.F.C.
- Recorded: 2012
- Genre: Hip hop
- Length: 4:18
- Label: Atlantic; Rostrum
- Songwriter(s): Cameron Thomaz; Atangana; Eric Dan; Jeremy Kulousek; Aliaune Thiam
- Producer(s): Jo A; I.D. Labs

Let It Go is song by American hip hop recording artist Wiz Khalifa, featuring vocals from singer Akon, from the Khalifa's second studio album O.N.I.F.C. (2012).

== Charts ==
Chart (2012)	Peak position
Belgium (Ultratop 50 Flanders)	93
Canada (Canadian Hot 100)	91
US Billboard Hot 100	87
US Hot R&B/Hip-Hop Songs (Billboard)	25
US Digital Song Sales (Billboard)	41
