= Frick Park =

Park in Pittsburgh, Pennsylvania

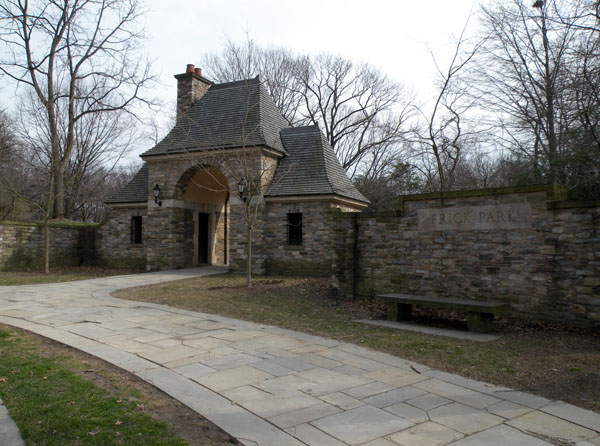
- Reynolds St. Entrance
- Interactive map of Frick Park
- Type: Municipal Park
- Location: Pittsburgh, Pennsylvania United States
- Coordinates: 40°25′57″N 79°54′18″W
- Area: 644 acres (1.006 mi^{2})
- Created: 1919
- Opened: 25 June 1927
- Operator: City of Pittsburgh Parks & Recreation (CitiParks), Department of Public Works
- Website: pittsburghparks.org/explore-your-parks/regional-parks/frick-park
- Frick Park
- U.S. National Register of Historic Places
- Pittsburgh Historic Designation
- NRHP reference No.: 100003450

Significant dates
- Added to NRHP: February 28, 2019
- Designated PGHL: March 6, 2024

Frick Park is the largest municipal park in Pittsburgh, Pennsylvania, United States, covering 644 acres (1.006 mi^{2}). It is one of Pittsburgh's four historic large parks.

== History ==
The park began when the industrialist Henry Clay Frick, upon his death in 1919, bequeathed 151 acres (61 ha) south of Clayton, his Point Breeze mansion (which is now part of the Frick Art & Historical Center). He also arranged for a $2 million trust fund ($37.1 million today) for long-term maintenance for the park, which opened on June 25, 1927. Frick had not wanted to create the maintenance fund but had promised to honor his daughter Helen's debutante wish.

Henry Clay Frick's son, Childs Frick, developed his lifelong love of animals in the woods and ravines of the park. Childs Frick went on to be an American vertebrate paleontologist and a major benefactor and trustee of the American Museum of Natural History.

Over the years, the park grew from the original land in Point Breeze to include Squirrel Hill to the border of Edgewood. In a city that Frick helped to industrialize, it is one of the few areas of steep ravines and mature woods that remain relatively undisturbed, forming a nature reserve of native plants and abundant wildlife. Owls, amphibians, wild turkey, fox, and many mammal species are found in the park.

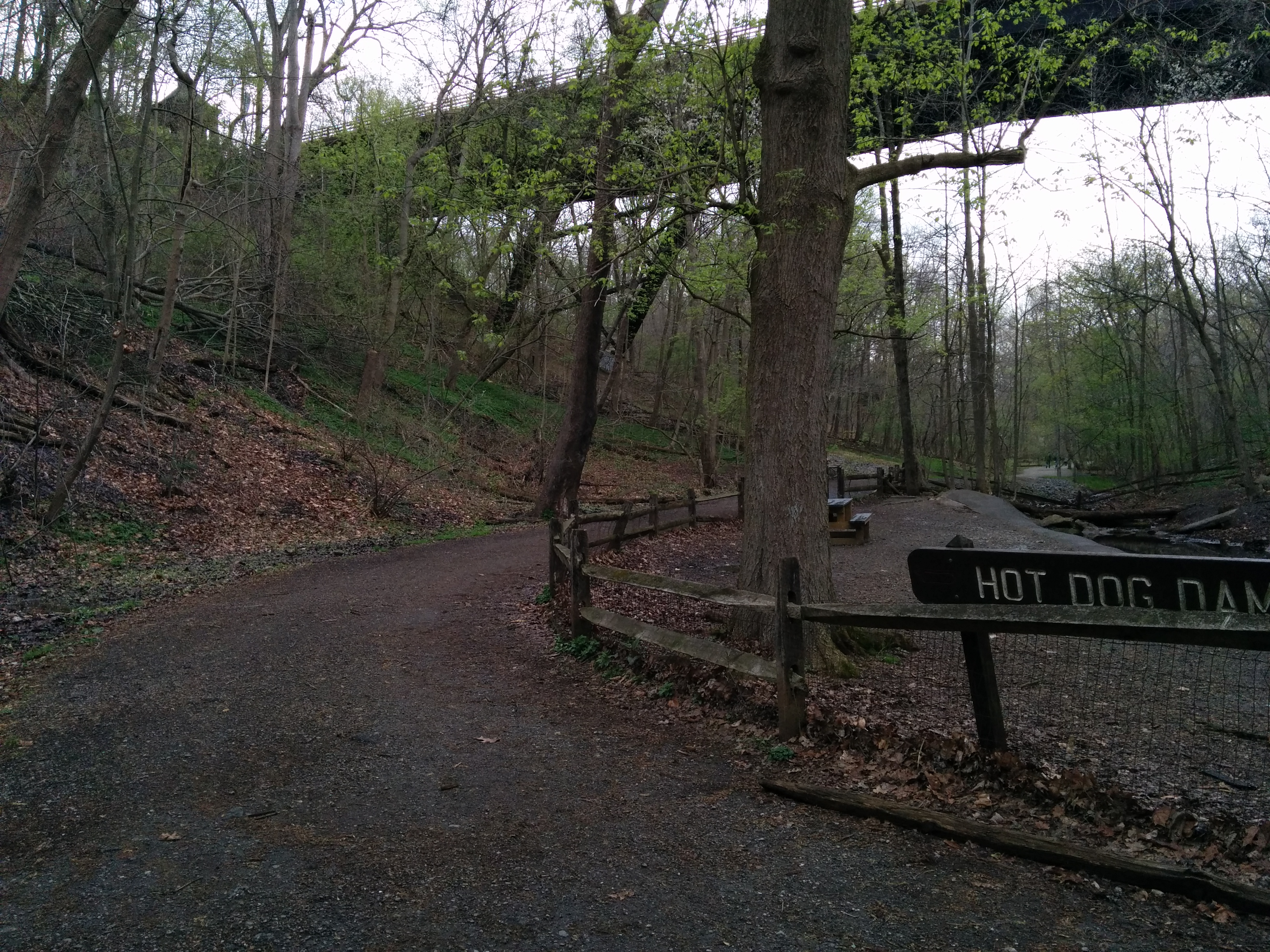
Hiking trail in Frick Park beneath the Fern Hollow Bridge (2015)

On January 28, 2022, the Fern Hollow Bridge, a steel rigid-frame bridge carrying Forbes Avenue across the park at Hot Dog Dam Dog Park collapsed, injuring 10. The remains of the bridge landed on and blocked a recreational trail. The bridge was rebuilt, and it and the trail below were reopened in December 2022.

== Characteristics and facilities ==
=== Frick Environmental Center ===
The original Frick Environmental Center, completed in 1979, originally housed the City's Environmental Education Program and for many years hosted ecological and other programs related to the park. A fire in 2002 rendered the building functionally unusable. Demolition at the site was completed and construction began in late-2014.

The current, 15,500-square-foot Frick Environmental Center opened to the public in 2016, following a $16 million construction project. The site includes indoor and outdoor classrooms, public restrooms, and other facilities, and has various energy-efficient and green features, include a photovoltaic array and geothermal bore field. The center was certified as LEED Platinium the next year. The Pittsburgh Parks Conservancy operates the center in collaboration with the City of Pittsburgh.

=== Ecology ===
The eastern park boundary is Nine Mile Run, a formerly heavily polluted stream which was restored between 2003 and 2006. The addition of 2.2 miles of Nine Mile Run extended Frick Park nearly to the Monongahela River.

Restoration efforts in 2017-18 involved the removal of about 2.6 acres of bush honeysuckle, an invasive plant that had affected the park for some 20 years, displacing native plants. Following the clearance of the honeysuckle, the Pittsburgh Parks Conservancy discovered ten healthy butternut trees. This was a significant discovery since every other tree in the park is thought to be affected by butternut canker, a fungal disease lethal to plants.

=== Recreational uses ===
The park includes several playgrounds. Frick Park Playground on Beechwood Boulevard near Nicholson Street, opened in the early 1960s, features an unusual cement slide set into a hillside. Originally painted red and bordered by cobblestones, it is today painted blue and surrounded by rubberized playground surfacing. The playground is popularly known as Blue Slide Park. Nearby are basketball courts and a baseball diamond.

Sledding on a nearby hill that slopes down from Beechwood is a popular winter pastime. Sledders sometimes crash into the trees at the bottom or collide because two approaches down the hill – one shallow and one steep – intersect at the bottom. As a result, in 2010 the city posted "no sledding" signs for liability reasons.

Frick Park also has a dog park. An annual Shakespeare in the Park performance occurs in the upper portion of the park.

== In popular culture ==
Pittsburgh rapper Mac Miller named his 2011 album Blue Slide Park after the playground and his song "Frick Park Market" for a small store near the Point Breeze park boundary. Several vigils in Miller's memory were held at the park after his 2018 death.
