= Fern Hollow Bridge =

Bridge in Pittsburgh, Pennsylvania

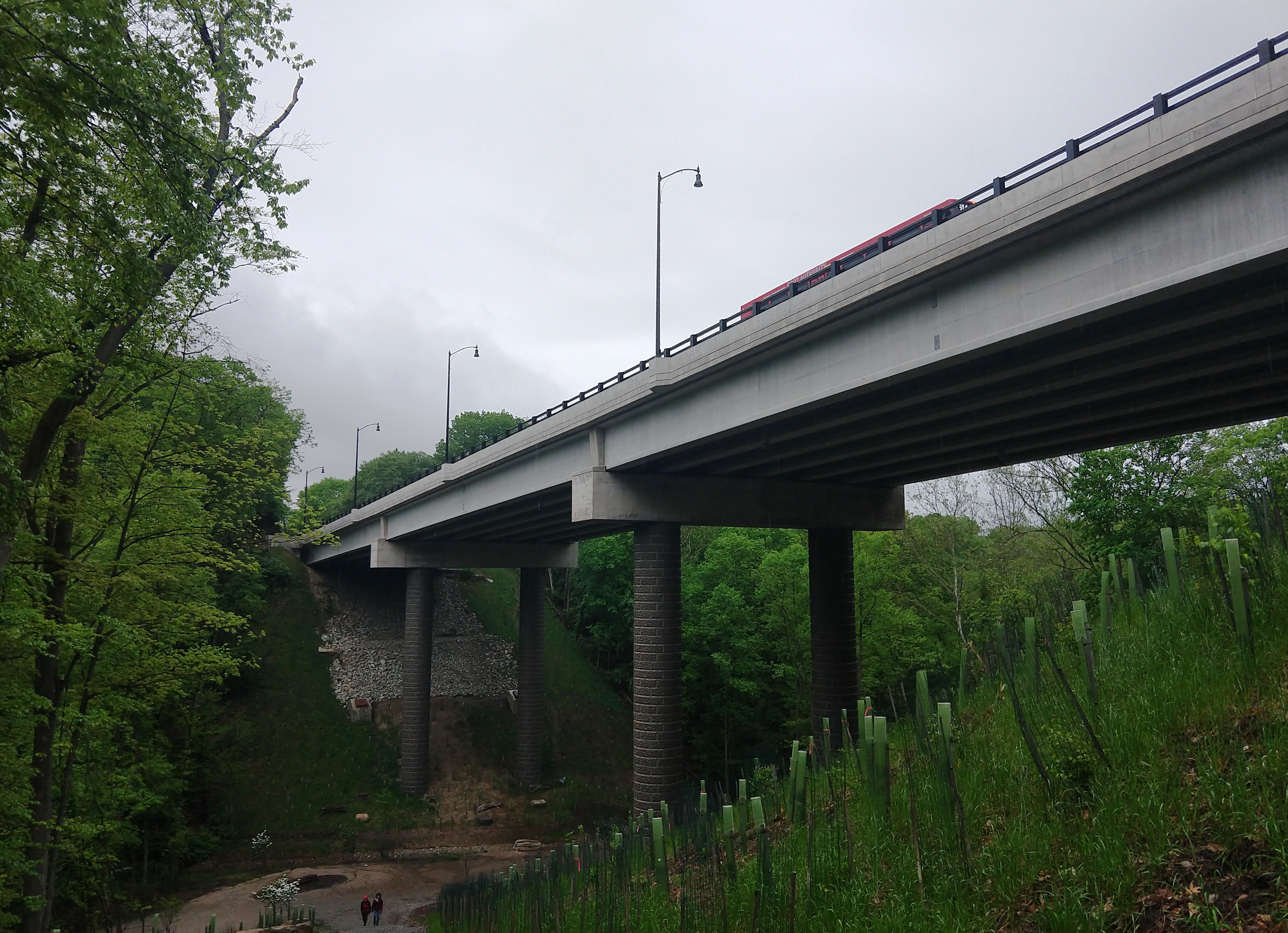
- The current bridge seen from the northwest
- Coordinates: 40°26′22″N 79°54′01″W
- Owner: PennDOT
- Maintained by: City of Pittsburgh

Characteristics
- Design: three-span continuous composite pre-stressed concrete I-beam with integral abutments
- Material: Concrete
- Width: 64 feet (20 m)
- No. of spans: 3
- No. of lanes: 4

History
- Contracted lead designer: HDR, Inc.
- Constructed by: Swank Construction
- Construction start: May 9, 2022
- Construction end: December 2022
- Inaugurated: December 20, 2022

Location
- Interactive map of Fern Hollow Bridge

The Fern Hollow Bridge is a bridge in the East End of Pittsburgh, Pennsylvania, United States, that carries Forbes Avenue over a large ravine in Frick Park. The current bridge is the third one on the site. The first Fern Hollow Bridge opened in 1901 as a steel deck arch, and was demolished in 1972 while the second bridge was being built. The second bridge opened in 1973 and collapsed on January 28, 2022. Construction of the third bridge began on May 9, 2022, and the third bridge was dedicated on December 20, 2022.

The bridge lies west of the intersection of Forbes Avenue and South Braddock Avenue, connecting the Squirrel Hill neighborhood with the neighborhoods of Point Breeze and Regent Square.

== First bridge (1901–1972) ==
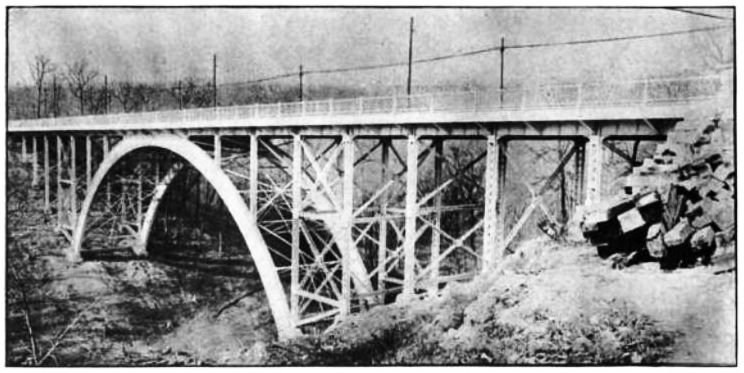
Original bridge (1901–1972)

In February 1900, the "Councils of the city of Pittsburg" appropriated $100,000 for the construction of a street railway and highway bridge across Fern Hollow. A steel deck arch bridge was completed by Schultz Bridge & Iron Works (steelwork was subcontracted to American Bridge Company) and accepted on September 28, 1901. The central arch spanned 195 ft (59 m) with a rise of 50 ft (15 m); overall, the 1901 bridge was 438 ft (134 m) long and the vertical clearance under the bridge was approximately 94 ft (29 m) above the valley floor, although later press reports stated it varied between 60 and 125 ft (18 and 38 m). The roadway was 36 ft (11 m) wide, flanked on both sides by concrete sidewalks each 6 ft 6 in (1.98 m) wide. Unusually, the 1901 bridge was not built level, with one end being 15 ft (4.6 m) higher than the other. The four-lane bridge also carried double rail tracks for streetcar service.

== Second bridge (1973–2022) ==
Fern Hollow Bridge (1973)
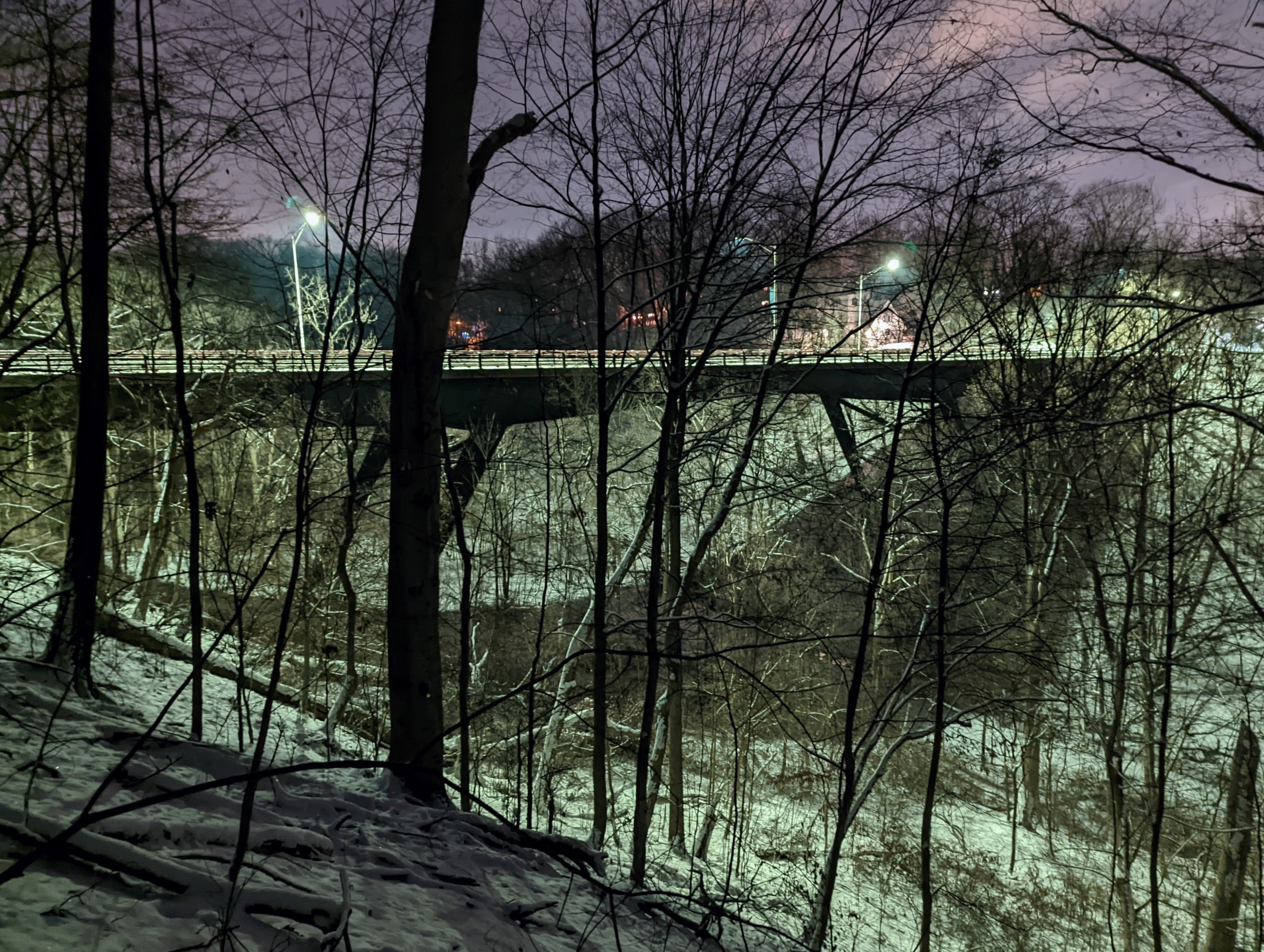
- Fern Hollow Bridge viewed through trees, three weeks before collapse (Jan 7, 2022)
- Coordinates: 40°26′22″N 79°54′01″W

History
- Inaugurated: June 1, 1973
- Collapsed: January 28, 2022

The 1901 bridge was replaced in 1973. The old bridge was closed in April 1972 and a new three-span steel rigid-frame bridge was built by Conn Construction Company for US$1,230,000 (equivalent to $9,470,000 in 2025), using COR-TEN weathering steel. The replacement bridge, designed by the firm of Richardson, Gordon and Associates (founded by George S. Richardson), opened on June 1, 1973, and was presented with a Prize Bridge award for the medium-span, high-clearance category by the American Institute of Steel Construction in 1974. Arthur W. Hedgren Jr. was chief design engineer and entered his design in the James F. Lincoln Arc Welding Foundation contest. Hedgren received a cash prize award and a summary of his ideas on this bridge design was published in a collection of winners. The Lincoln Electric Company had created the James F. Lincoln Arc Welding Foundation to share knowledge about welding.

The bridge used two welded steel girders, supported at each end on reinforced concrete caps poured atop stone masonry abutments; the deck was supported by welded steel floor beams and rolled steel stringers. The rigid frame supports were inclined welded steel legs resting on reinforced concrete thrust blocks. The structural steel in the bridge and its inclined supports was not coated, as the weathering steel used was designed to develop a protective patina over time.

Prior to its collapse in 2022, the 446.9-foot-long (136.2 m) replacement bridge had been listed by the National Bridge Inventory as being in poor condition since September 2011. The posted weight limit of the bridge was 26 short tons (24 t) and it carried more than 14,000 vehicles per day, with a posted speed limit of 35 mph (56 km/h). The bridge was inspected most recently on September 19, 2021, and the last inspection report was released in May 2022.

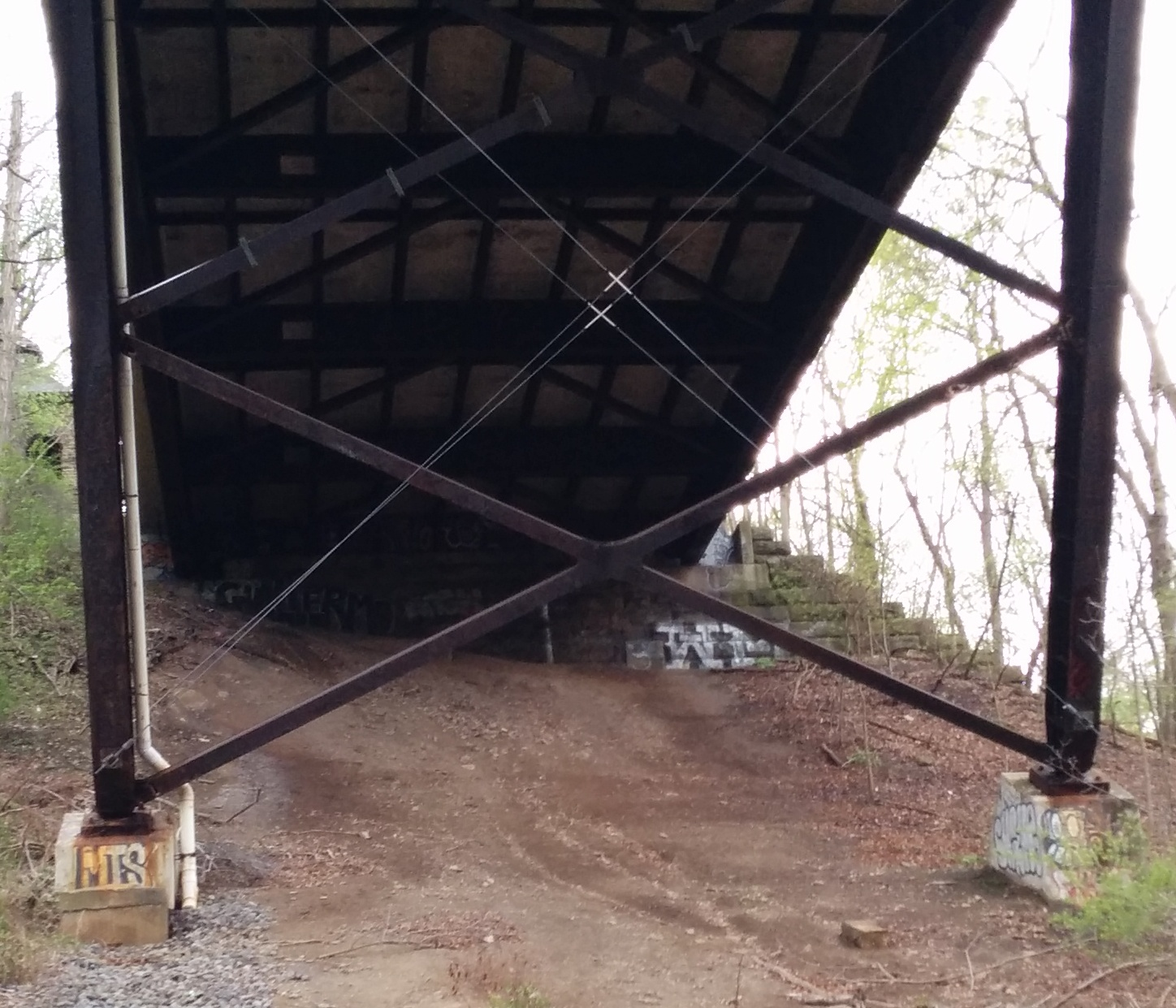
Bridge pier in 2015. The lower left-hand leg of the lowest X-brace was later found detached in 2018; the tensioned cables have been installed.

In December 2018, Greg Kochanski, a software engineer who frequently walked beneath the bridge, tweeted a photo he took at the base of the bridge. He expressed concern to the city that one of the original X-shaped cross braces on a bridge pier had corroded and severed where the pier met the ravine. He had privately observed the bridge supports were "well rusted, which he presumed was because of a drainage problem where melting ice and snow with salt from maintenance was draining down onto the beams". Kochanski observed in his tweet that tensioned cables already had been installed to replace the function of the cross-bracing. The city's 3-1-1 system opened a tracking ticket three days later; a few weeks after the ticket was opened, it was closed and the corroded cross brace was removed. Kochanski's tweet went viral following the bridge's collapse.

The steel cables had been installed in 2009; the 2021 inspection report noted "the cables were retightened in 2014 and are in good shape and are tight". A professor at the University of Pittsburgh faulted the use of the cables to replace the cross-braces, saying that officials "overestimated the contribution of the steel cable that was installed."

=== Collapse ===
Collapsed Fern Hollow Bridge (Jan 29, 2022)

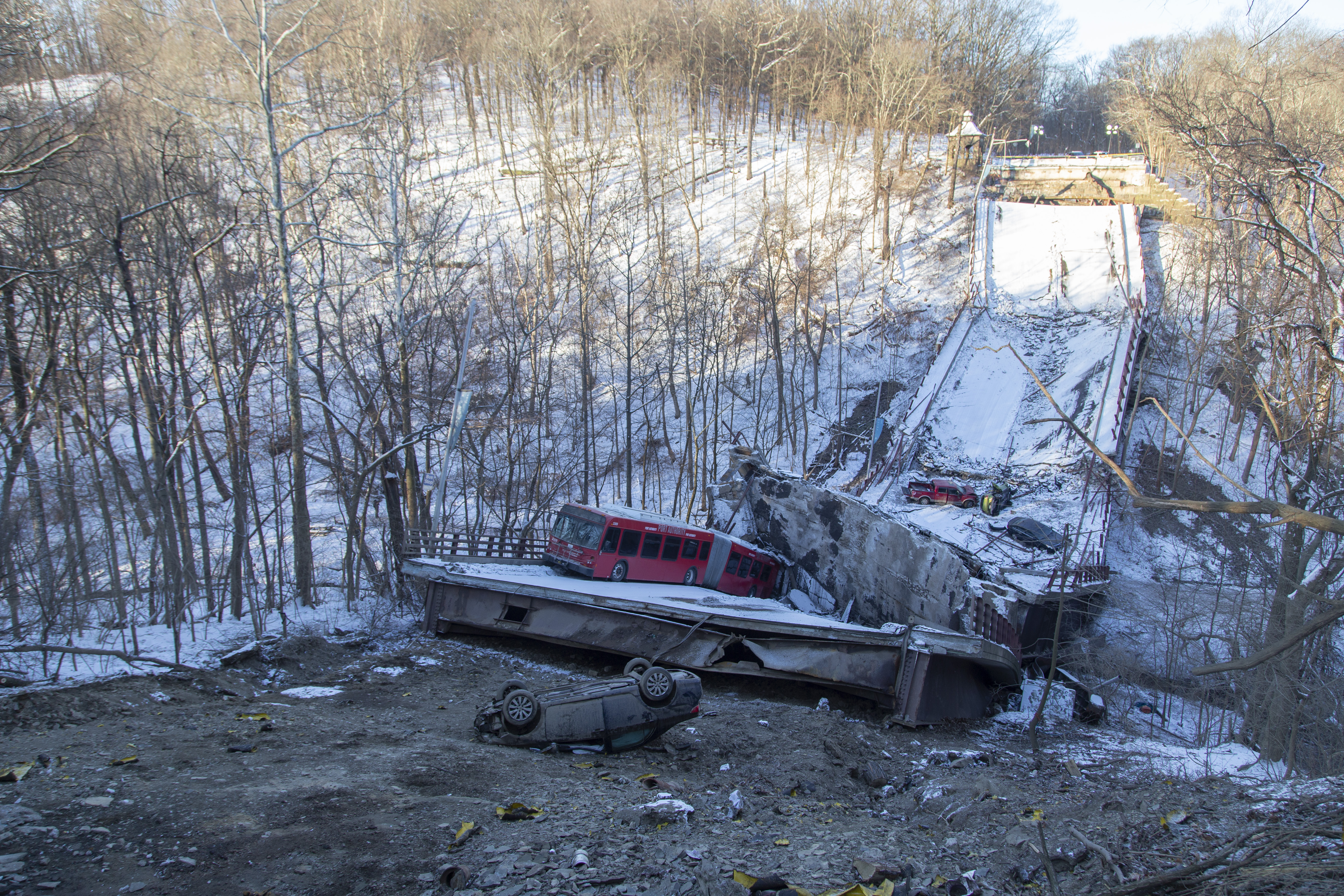
From the east end, looking west

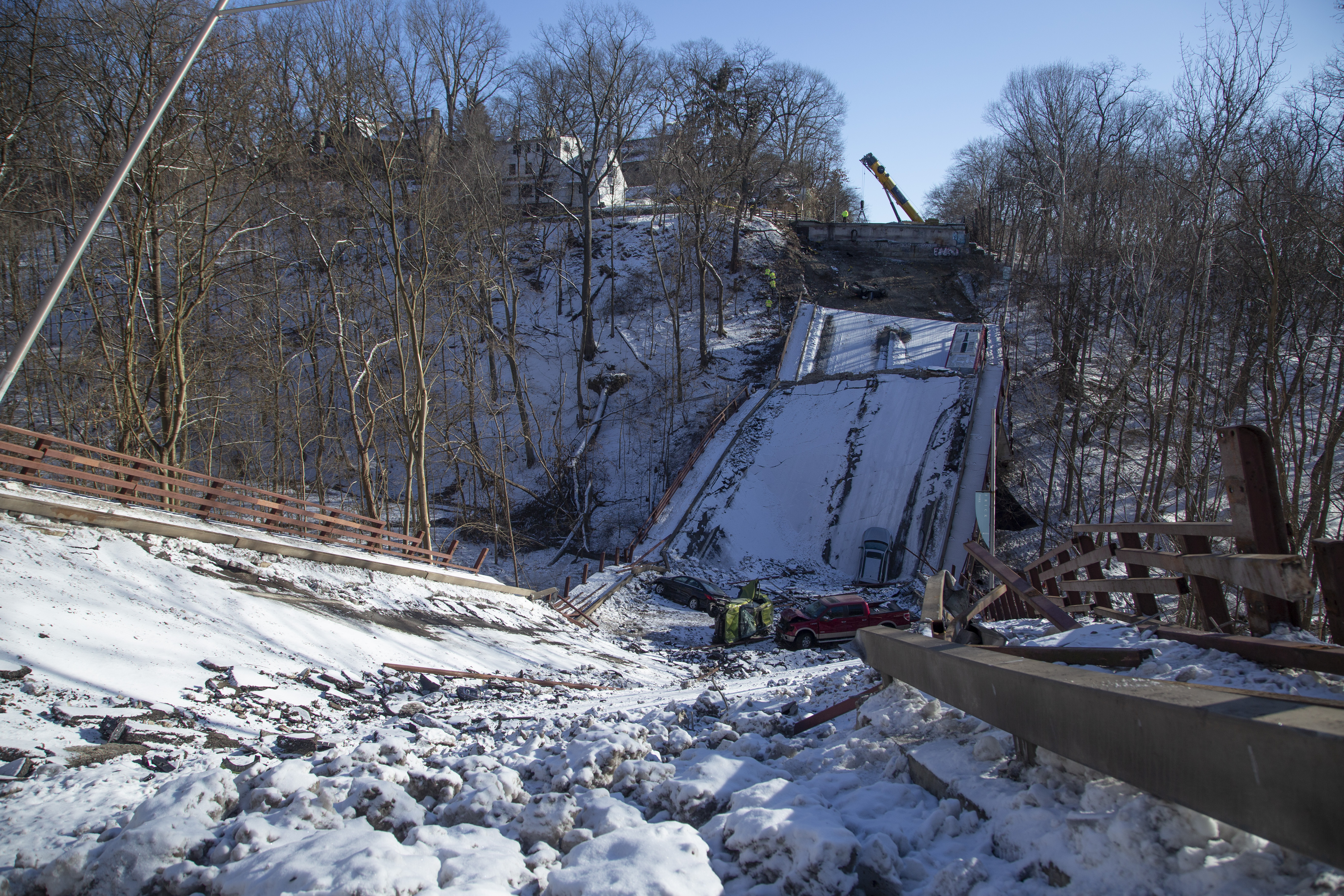
From the west end, looking east

photographed by NTSB personnel

On January 28, 2022, at 6:39 a.m. EST, the Fern Hollow Bridge collapsed. Nearby residents reported hearing a loud boom and a whooshing noise around 6:35–6:40 a.m. Many credited the early morning time of collapse for the lack of fatalities, as the bridge was a route for many school buses, Pittsburgh Regional Transit (PRT) buses, and commuters to work. Pittsburgh Bureau of Fire Chief Darryl Jones said it was very fortunate the collapse occurred before the morning rush hour. The bridge was blanketed with snow from an overnight storm that had passed through the area.

Five vehicles were on the bridge when it collapsed, including a PRT articulated bus built by New Flyer in 2013. Another passenger vehicle drove off the eastern bridge abutment after the collapse and came to rest on its roof. At least 10 people were injured; three were taken to hospitals by ambulances. None of the injuries appeared to be life-threatening. Some first responders rappelled about 150 ft (46 m) into the ravine, while others formed a human chain to rescue victims. According to a law enforcement official, a passing jogger helped to rescue some of the motorists. The count of ten injured included some first responders who slipped and fell during the rescue operation. The initial rescue effort was completed by 8:30 a.m. EST while emergency personnel continued to check under the wreckage for any trapped victims; none were found. A crane erected at Forbes and Briarcliff was used to retrieve the wrecked vehicles, and the bus (22 tons) was lifted from the site on January 31.

Under the road deck, the bridge carried a 16-inch (41 cm) natural gas pipeline, which severed in the collapse. Local residents were evacuated from their homes in response to reports of a "massive leak" and strong scent of natural gas. Officials shut down the gas lines in the area within a half hour of the collapse.

The bus, PRT fleet number 3309, was operating route 61B outbound from downtown Pittsburgh (eastbound), and had nearly reached the east end before the bridge began to collapse. Driver Daryl Luciani later reported "the bus was bouncing and shaking" during the event. After the collapse, first responders placed a ladder by the bus door, which Luciani and the two passengers aboard used to descend to the floor of the valley before walking up to Forbes.

==== Political response ====
President Joe Biden had been scheduled to visit Pittsburgh on January 28 to speak about infrastructure at Carnegie Mellon University's Mill 19. After learning about the collapse, White House press secretary Jen Psaki confirmed via Twitter that Biden would continue with his planned speech to promote the Infrastructure Investment and Jobs Act. Biden visited the collapsed bridge at approximately 1:30 p.m., before his scheduled speech, and told reporters that he intended to direct funding to repair all 43,000 bridges in the U.S.

Biden was accompanied by multiple Pennsylvania politicians, including Mayor Ed Gainey, Allegheny County Executive Rich Fitzgerald, Governor Tom Wolf, Lieutenant Governor John Fetterman, U.S. Senator Bob Casey Jr., U.S. Representatives Conor Lamb and Mike Doyle, State Senator Jay Costa, and State Representative Dan Frankel. Wolf declared a state of disaster on January 28.

==== Investigation ====
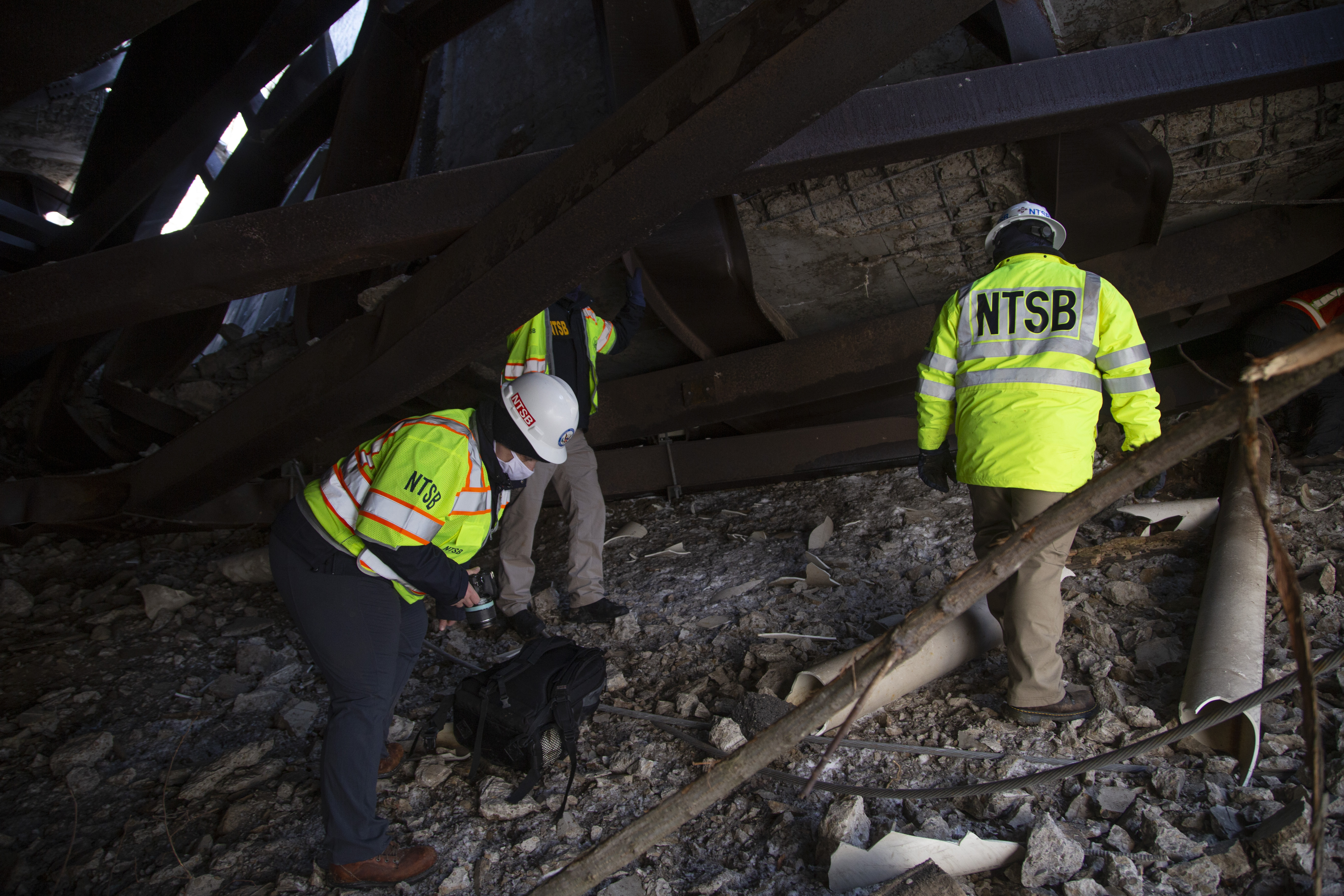
NTSB investigators under the collapsed bridge (Jan 28, 2022)

Shortly after the collapse, the National Transportation Safety Board announced it was sending a team led by Chair Jennifer Homendy to investigate the cause. According to Homendy, the investigation would take 12 to 18 months to complete; the team began gathering evidence after their arrival on January 28. In a January 29 press conference held after the first complete day on-site, Homendy stated a preliminary report would be available in approximately 10 days, but the final report would require "a long, technical investigation" reviewing bridge inspection reports and maintenance records, video (from local businesses and the PRT bus), traffic counts, weight requirements, and road treatments.

The preliminary report was released on February 7. The collapse apparently initiated at the west end of the structure. Surveillance video recovered from the bus showed the bridge had already fallen off the western abutment when the eastern expansion joint began to separate. No primary fractures were found in the critical areas of the welded steel girders. PennDOT ordered reviews of structural adequacy for five bridges with similar rigid K frame designs immediately; the five bridges (Canon-McMillan Alumni Bridge in North Strabane, Shenango Road Bridge in Beaver, Philip J. Fahy Memorial Bridge in Bethlehem, McCallum Street Bridge in Philadelphia, and Murray Avenue Bridge over Beechwood Blvd in Pittsburgh) were found to be in "fair" condition at their last inspections.

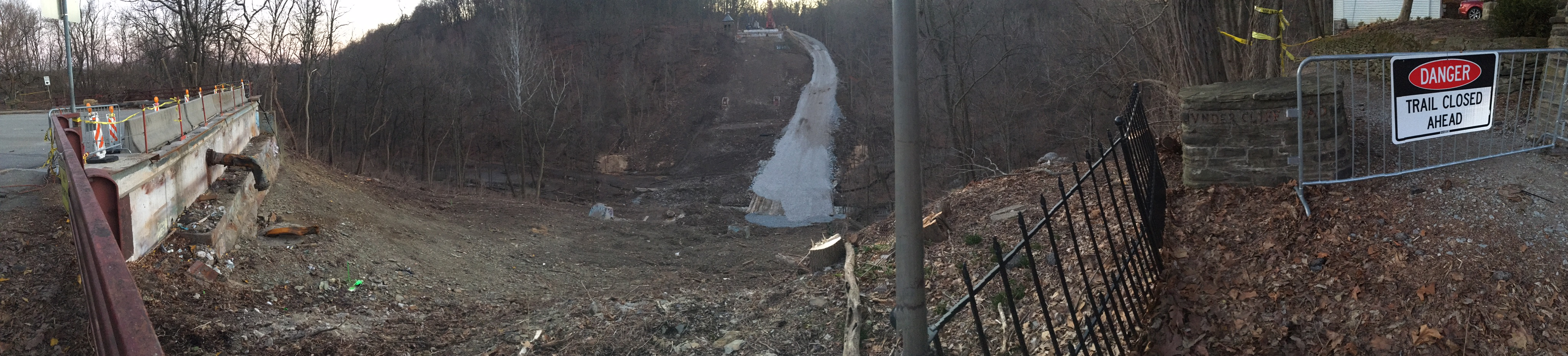
Panoramic view of Fern Hollow from the east end (Feb 27, 2022). By this time, all broken bridge structures had been removed.

The city briefly made an observation site available, but closed it by February 2, as the reconstruction effort began.

In November 2023, victims took the city to court over access to bridge maintenance records. The 2023 NTSB report concluded that a lack of periodic maintenance by the city led to clogged drains that caused corrosion, a contributing factor for the collapse; documents also questioned PennDOT's bridge inspection procedures.

On February 21, 2024, the NTSB released its final report, faulting both city and state inspection processes for lack of required maintenance, repairs, and eventual bridge closure. Lawyers for injured parties reaffirmed their commitment to sue the city and other responsible parties for damages.

== Third bridge ==
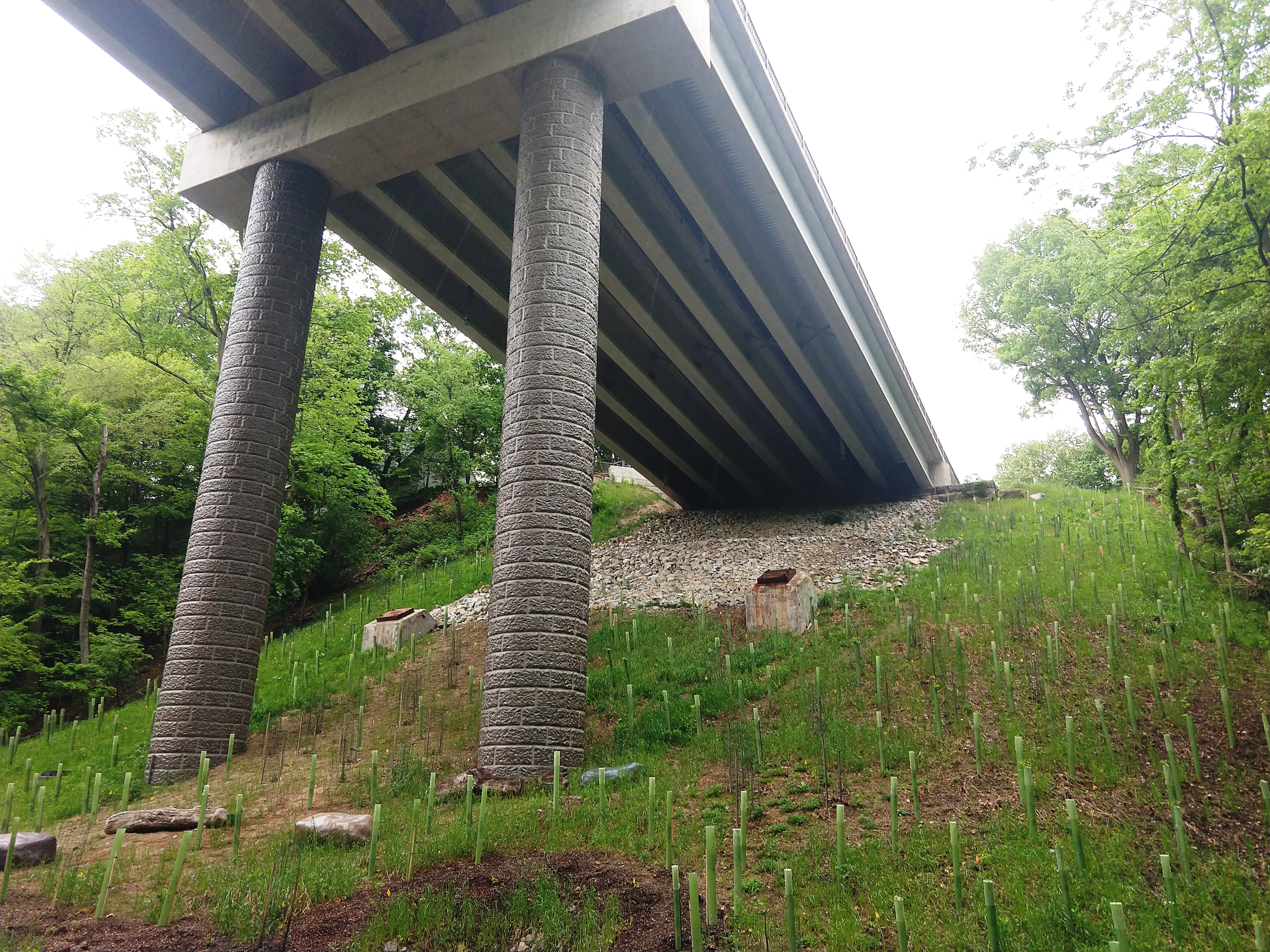
Underside of the east end of the new bridge. The original anchors for the 1973 bridge remain in place.

The replacement bridge was designed by HDR, Inc. and constructed by Swank Construction of New Kensington; the contracts were awarded without bidding due to the emergency declaration and prior history with PennDOT. Federal funds of $25.3 million were allocated for design and construction from the Federal Highway Administration's National Highway Performance Program, which in turn was funded by the Infrastructure Investment and Jobs Act of 2021. During the first weekend in February, Swank moved demolition equipment to the site in preparation for removing the rubble. Building a new rigid K-frame bridge was unlikely, as the lead time for the steel required was more than 18 months. The replacement bridge was designed and built in sections; once HDR released the design for a section, Swank built it while HDR designed the next section.

On March 8, PennDOT announced that construction of the replacement bridge was planned to start in late April 2022. The replacement bridge is a three-span continuous composite pre-stressed concrete I-beam with integral abutments. It carries four vehicle lanes, each 10 feet (3.0 m) wide, flanked by 2-foot-wide (0.61 m) shoulders. The north side of the bridge has a 5-foot-wide (1.5 m) sidewalk, while the south side has a 10-foot-5-inch-wide (3.18 m) shared-use path. The overall width is 64 feet (20 m). After viewing the proposed design, the Pittsburgh Art Commission called it "very similar to any highway overpass" and urged Mayor Gainey and Governor Wolf to pause the design, despite its role as "an important connection ... [that] really needs to be [rebuilt] with speed" as "the aesthetics of the bridge cannot be ignored." City Controller Michael Lamb and Councilman Corey O'Connor joined the call to reconsider the initial design. Lamb added "Unfortunately, the initial images reflect a bridge that does not match the now-collapsed bridge in terms of space for people on non-motor vehicles, nor does it match the aesthetic of Frick Park or the adjacent neighborhoods."

Construction of the replacement bridge began on May 9, 2022, marked by drilling for caissons and concrete pouring. By July 25, the support piers had been completed and the first prestressed concrete beams had arrived on-site, where they were lifted into place. The replacement bridge was structurally complete by December 2022, and a ribbon-cutting for the new bridge was held on December 20, 2022. The bridge opened to vehicular traffic around 1:30pm on December 21, 2022, with a single lane in each direction along with a physically separate combined pedestrian/bike lane.

Work continued into Spring 2023 to complete the full bridge design including two lanes of vehicular traffic in each direction, a pedestrian-only sidewalk, and restored trail access under the bridge. On June 12, 2023, the bridge was again closed so that crews could finish various elements of the bridge, including more permanent paving and sidewalks. The bridge officially reopened on July 7, 2023.
