= Cabin Fever 2 (mixtape) =

Mixtape by Wiz Khalifa
- Released: October 16, 2012
- Recorded: 2012
- Genre: Hip hop
- Label: Rostrum; Taylor Gang
- Producer: The Invasion; I.D. Labs; Juicy J; Sledgren; Cozmo; Crazy Mike; Lewi V Beatz; Deputy; Iamsu!; Pierre Medor

Wiz Khalifa chronology
Taylor Allderdice (2012)	Cabin Fever 2 (2012)	O.N.I.F.C. (2012)

Cabin Fever 2 is the eleventh mixtape by American rapper Wiz Khalifa, it was released on October 16, 2012. The mixtape features guest appearances from Problem, Iamsu!, Menace, Juicy J, J.R. Donato, Chevy Woods, Lavish and French Montana.

== Background ==
On October 19, 2012, the music video for "STU" was released. On November 1, 2012, the music video for "Tweak Is Heavy" was released. On January 18, 2013, the music video for "100 Bottles" was released.

== Critical response ==
Jesse Fairfax of HipHopDX said, "While not exactly pioneering anything new, Cabin Fever 2 further establishes Wiz Khalifa as a serviceable rapper aware enough to blend in with what's popular for the sake of maintaining a presence. Largely dependent on the blueprints laid by Three 6 Mafia and Lex Luger, he brings life to the typically mundane and makes up for instances such as French Montana's barely decipherable verse on "Nothin Like the Rest." In spite of his trendy one-dimensional concepts, there is ultimately redeemable art and magic to be found in Wiz's work here."

== Track listing ==
No.	Title	Producer(s)	Length
1.	"Bout Me" (featuring Problem & Iamsu!)	The Invasion; Iamsu! (add.)	3:31
2.	"Fucc Shit" (featuring Menace)	Sledgren	3:49
3.	"MIA" (featuring Juicy J)	I.D. Labs	4:10
4.	"Pacc Talk" (featuring Juicy J & Problem)	Cozmo	3:44
5.	"Ridin Round" (featuring Juicy J)	Juicy J; Crazy Mike	3:31
6.	"Smokin' Drinkin'" (featuring Problem)	The Invasion	4:07
7.	"STU" (featuring Juicy J)	The Invasion	2:31
8.	"Bout That"	Cozmo; Deputy; Pierre Medor (co.)	4:13
9.	"I'm Feelin" (featuring Problem, J.R. Donato & Juicy J)	Lewi V Beatz	4:27
10.	"Deep Sleep"	I.D. Labs	4:41
11.	"100 Bottles" (featuring Problem)	I.D. Labs	3:12
12.	"Thuggin" (featuring Chevy Woods & Lavish)	I.D. Labs; Sledgren	3:41
13.	"Tweak Is Heavy"	The Invasion	5:42
14.	"Nothin Like The Rest" (featuring French Montana)	I.D. Labs	2:58

== Charts ==
Chart (2012)	Peak position
US Top R&B/Hip-Hop Albums (Billboard)	64
