= O.N.I.F.C. =

Studio album by Wiz Khalifa
- Released: December 4, 2012
- Genre: Hip-hop
- Length: 73:37
- Labels: Taylor Gang; Rostrum; Atlantic
- Producers: Benjy Grinberg (exec.); Danny D. (exec.); Tim Blacksmith (exec.); Autoro Whitfield; Benny Blanco; Cardo; Danja; Dpat; Drumma Boy; Earl & E; Jim Jonsin; Jo A; I.D. Labs; Illangelo; Nice Rec; Oak Felder; Pharrell Williams; Pop Wansel; Rico Love; Ronald Colson; Rykeyz; Sledgren; Stargate; The Invasion

Wiz Khalifa chronology
Cabin Fever 2 (2012)	O.N.I.F.C. (2012)	Live in Concert (2013)

Singles from O.N.I.F.C.
- 1. "Work Hard, Play Hard" Released: April 23, 2012; 2. "Remember You" Released: September 24, 2012

O.N.I.F.C. is the fourth studio album by American rapper Wiz Khalifa. The album was released on December 4, 2012, by Atlantic Records, Rostrum Records and Taylor Gang Entertainment. The album's title was inspired by the album H.N.I.C. by Prodigy of Mobb Deep, and is an initialism for "Only Nigga In First Class". Upon release, O.N.I.F.C. received generally mixed reviews from contemporary music critics. The album debuted at number two on the US Billboard 200 selling 148,000 copies in its first week.

== Background ==
Guests on the album include 2 Chainz, Akon, Berner, Cam'ron, Courtney Noelle, Juicy J, Chevy Woods, Iamsu!, Lola Monroe, Pharrell, Problem, Tuki Carter, The Weeknd, and Amber Rose. Producers involved in the album include Cardo, Benny Blanco, Danja, I.D. Labs, Jim Jonsin, Pharrell Williams, Sledgren, Stargate and Pop Wansel. Fellow Pittsburgh-rapper Mac Miller has also recorded for the album, but it didn't make the cut. Wiz Khalifa announced on his Twitter account that he has a track in which he aims to collaborate with 50 Cent, making his guest appearance a possibility on the album. Wiz Khalifa released the track later, titled "Telescope" featuring the rapper. 50 Cent confirmed another track with him in an interview with the radio station, Power 106, which can be part of his upcoming project Street King Immortal or may be included in Wiz Khalifa's album but later turned into a free record. Wiz Khalifa has said Snoop Dogg, Mac Miller and Curren$y did not make the album due to records not being made in time and he had also talked to Drake and E-40 about being on the album.

The track listing was first confirmed on September 25, 2012, with the standard version's tracks. The album cover was ranked the fifth best of 2012 by Complex.

== Release and promotion ==
Wiz Khalifa announced on April 11, 2012, that the album's release date would be on August 28. However the album was pushed back to September 18, 2012. On September 5, 2012, the album was pushed back again with no release date.

To promote the album before its release, Wiz Khalifa recorded the mixtape, Taylor Allderdice named after his hometown Taylor Allderdice High School, from which he graduated in 2006. The mixtape was released on March 13 under the Taylor Gang imprint and Rostrum Records. On October 16, 2012, Wiz Khalifa also released another mixtape titled Cabin Fever 2 in preparation for O.N.I.F.C. Wiz Khalifa went on the 2050 Tour in promotion of the album with Juicy J, Chevy Woods and Lola Monroe. The last show was on December 12, 2012, back in his home city of Pittsburgh.

== Singles ==
The album's lead single, "Work Hard, Play Hard", was released on April 23, 2012, which was produced by Benny Blanco and the production team Stargate. The music video premiered on May 23, 2012, and included a tribute to Jimi Hendrix. Multiple Taylor Gang members make cameo appearances as well. As of June 10, 2014, the song has sold over 2,000,000 digital copies in the United States and peaked at number 17 on the Billboard Hot 100.

Wiz Khalifa announced and released the album's second single on September 24, 2012, after the album's delay. The single is called "Remember You" and features vocals from Canadian R&B recording artist The Weeknd, produced by Dpat and The Weeknd's longtime collaborator Illangelo. Wiz Khalifa also revealed the single's artwork. The song was released on the same day. The single has since peaked at number 63 on the Billboard Hot 100. On November 13, 2012, the music video was released for "Remember You".

On November 27, 2012, Wiz Khalifa released the music video for the song "The Bluff" featuring rapper Cam'ron. The music video was shot in Harlem, New York. On March 21, 2013, the music video was released for "Let It Go" featuring Akon. On April 25, 2013, the music video was released for "Bout Me" featuring Problem and Iamsu!. On June 11, 2013, the music video was released for "Paperbond". On November 12, 2013, the music video was released for "The Plan" featuring Juicy J.

== Critical reception ==
Professional ratings
Aggregate scores
Source	Rating
Metacritic	56/100
Review scores
Source	Rating
AllMusic	3/5 stars
The A.V. Club	C
Entertainment Weekly	B+
The Guardian	2/5 stars
NME	4/10
Pitchfork Media	4.8/10
PopMatters	7/10
Rolling Stone	3/5 stars
Slant Magazine	2/5 stars
Spin	3/10

O.N.I.F.C. received generally mixed reviews from contemporary music critics. At Metacritic, which assigns a normalized rating out of 100 to reviews from mainstream critics, the album received an average score of 56, based on 20 reviews. AllMusic's Fred Thomas commented that it veers "between the growing pains of an artist forced to develop more quickly than he's ready to and material simply less inspired than the hungrier, more excited sounds that came before" on Rolling Papers. Alex Macpherson of The Guardian felt that the album's "finest turns come from guests" and called Khalifa "a serviceable but limited type, mostly concerned with getting stoned, capable of adequately riding a catchy hook ... or interesting beat". Evan Rytlewski of The A.V. Club criticized that he "splits the difference between his druggy muse and his pop obligations, without much interest in finding a middle ground." Slant Magazine's Ted Scheinman found its ultimate flaws to "have less to do with Khalifa's ego and more with the dumb, reflexive materialism of the lyrics." Pitchfork Media's Jordan Sargent found his rapping inconsequential to the production and wrote that most of the album "questions the relevancy of Khalifa's artistic existence." Dan Weiss of Spin felt that Khalifa "just doesn't say anything worth faintly echoing through a reverb filter."

In a positive review, Kyle Anderson of Entertainment Weekly wrote that Khalifa's "bleary-eyed charisma elevates both radio bait" and "trippy shape-shifters". Although he found the subject matter to be "pretty standard", Jody Rosen of Rolling Stone commented that Khalifa's "aural smoke billows" are "just off-kilter enough ... to give you a contact high", and called the album "as solid as Rolling Papers was slack." Sowmya Krishnamurthy of The Village Voice felt that its production "really works" and said that the album is "pleasant enough if not particularly inspired". David Amidon of PopMatters asserted that, "as pop rap albums go, O.N.I.F.C. is beyond solid, full of immaculate production and airtight if simplistic rhymes about money, girls and weed."

== Commercial performance ==
O.N.I.F.C. debuted at number two on the US Billboard 200, selling 148,000 copies in its first week. In its second week the album sold 40,000 more copies dropping to number 25. As of March 2013, it has sold 352,000 copies. The album was certified platinum by the Recording Industry Association of America (RIAA) for combined sales and album-equivalent units of over a million units in the United States.

Several songs from O.N.I.F.C. charted upon the album's release. "Let It Go" featuring Akon debuted and peaked at number 87 on the Billboard Hot 100, number 91 on the Billboard Canadian Hot 100 chart and number 25 on the US Hot R&B/Hip-Hop Songs chart. "It's Nothin'" featuring 2 Chainz and "Paperbond" both debuted and peaked at numbers seven and 22 respectively on the Bubbling Under Hot 100 Singles chart, while "Medicated" featuring Chevy Woods & Juicy J and "Bluffin'" featuring Berner peaked at numbers 44 and 47 on the Hot R&B/Hip-Hop Songs chart, respectively.

In 2013, O.N.I.F.C. was ranked as the 67th most popular album of the year on the Billboard 200.

== Track listing ==
No.	Title	Writer(s)	Producer(s)	Length
1.	"Intro"	C. Thomaz; R. LaTour; E. Murray; S. Simons	Cardo; Sledgren	0:40
2.	"Paperbond"	Thomaz; E. Dan; J. Kulousek; Z. Vaughan	I.D. Labs	3:28
3.	"Bluffin'" (featuring Berner)	Thomaz; C. Gholson; G. Milam	Drumma Boy	5:32
4.	"Let It Go" (featuring Akon)	Thomaz; Atangana; Dan; Kulousek; A. Thiam	Jo A; I.D. Labs (co.)	4:18
5.	"The Bluff" (featuring Cam'ron)	Thomaz; Dan; Kulouske; Vaughan; C. Giles	I.D. Labs	3:48
6.	"Work Hard, Play Hard"	Thomaz; B. Levin; M. Storleer Eriksen; T. Erik Hermansen	Benny Blanco; Stargate	3:40
7.	"Got Everything" (featuring Courtney Noelle)	Thomaz; C. Noelle; Dan; Kulousek; Murray; R. Williamson	I.D. Labs; Sledgren; Rykeyz (co.)	3:14
8.	"Fall Asleep"	Thomaz, A. Wansel; W. Felder; R. Colson; A. Whitfield; T. L. Brown; D. R. Dugger II	@PopWansel; @Oakwud; @Flippa123	3:48
9.	"Time"	Thomaz; Dan; Kulousek; Vaughan	I.D. Labs	3:56
10.	"It's Nothin" (featuring 2 Chainz)	Thomaz; T. Epps; Gholson	Drumma Boy	3:48
11.	"Rise Above" (featuring Pharrell, Tuki Carter and Amber Rose)	Thomaz, P. Williams; Chris Carter	Pharrell	4:31
12.	"Initiation" (featuring LoLa Monroe and Amber Rose)	Thomaz; Murray; F. Melaku	Sledgren	4:29
13.	"Up in It"	Thomaz, J. Scheffer; R. Butler; E. Hood; E. Goudy II	Jim Jonsin; Earl & E (co.); Rico Love (co.)	3:44
14.	"No Limit"	Thomaz; Dan; Kulousek; P. Mudge	Nice Rec; I.D. Labs	9:27
15.	"The Plan" (featuring Juicy J)	Thomaz; Dan; Kulousek; Vaughan; J. Houston	I.D. Labs	4:54
16.	"Remember You" (featuring The Weeknd)	Thomaz; A. Tesfaye; C. Montagnese; A. Balshe; D. Patino; T. Mosley; J. Douglass; E. Lumpkin	Illangelo; Dpat	4:50
17.	"Medicated" (featuring Chevy Woods and Juicy J)	Thomaz; N. Hills; M. Araica; Houston; K. Woods	Danja	5:30
Total length:				73:37

Deluxe edition
No.	Title	Writer(s)	Producer(s)	Length
18.	"Bout Me" (featuring Problem and Iamsu!)	Thomaz; P. Y. Rodriguez; S. Williams; J. Martin	The Invasion	3:28
19.	"Stackin'" (featuring Juicy J)	Thomaz; Wansel; Felder; Colso; Whitfield; Houston	@PopWansel; @Flippa123; @AutoroWhit	3:45
20.	"Mary 3x"	Thomaz; LaTour	Cardo	4:20
21.	"Work Hard, Play Hard" (music video)		Benny Blanco; Stargate	3:55
22.	"Remember You" (music video)		Illangelo; Dpat	5:20
Total length:				94:27

Note

- (*) Denotes co-producer

== Personnel ==
Credits for O.N.I.F.C. adapted from Allmusic.

- 2 Chainz – featured artist
- Akon – featured artist
- Amber Rose – featured artist
- Marcella "Ms. Lago" Araica – engineer, mixing
- Elisa Asato – project coordinator
- Fatima Bah – design
- Berner – featured artist
- Big Jerm – engineer
- Tim Blacksmith – executive producer
- Benny Blanco – instrumentation, producer, programming
- Tanisha Broadwater – production coordination
- Jack "Suthernfolk" Brown – engineer
- Nathan Burgess – assistant
- Greg Gigendad Burke – art direction, design
- Cam'ron – featured artist
- Cardo – producer
- Tuki Carter – featured artist
- Danja – producer
- Danny D. – executive producer
- Sarah Demarco – project coordinator
- DPat – producer
- Andrew Drucker – engineer, producer
- Will Dzombak – assistant management
- Earl & E – producer
- Zvi Edelman – A&R
- Mikkel S. Eriksen – engineer, instrumentation, programming
- Lanre Gaba – A&R
- Chris Gehringer – mastering
- Christopher "Drumma Boy" Gholson – producer
- Lena Gonzalez – sampled vocals
- Eric Goudy II – keyboards, programming
- Benjy Grinberg – executive producer, management
- Tor Erik Hermansen – instrumentation, programming
- Marc Hom – photography
- Earl Hood – keyboards, programming
- Matt Huber – assistant
- Jo A – producer
- Jim Jonsin – keyboards, producer, programming
- Juicy J – featured artist
- Yoshi Kondo – engineer
- Mike Larson – arranger, editing, engineer, producer
- Andre Lipscomb – arranger, engineer
- Rico Love – producer, vocals
- Andrew Luftman – assistant engineer
- Robert Marks – engineer, mixing
- Donnie Meadows – production coordination
- Lola Monroe – featured artist
- Courtney Noelle – featured artist
- Priya Perera – A&R
- Pharrell – featured artist, producer
- Aryanna Platt – sampled vocals
- Nice Rec – producer
- Dana Richard – assistant
- Daniela Rivera – assistant engineer, engineer
- Ron Robinson – engineer
- Eric Henry Rostrum – additional production
- Rykeyz – producer
- Sledgren – producer
- Stargate – producer
- Phil Tan – mixing
- Miles Walker – engineer
- Andrew "Pop" Wansel – producer
- The Weeknd – featured artist
- Finis "KY" White – mixing
- Jason Wilkie – engineer
- Wiz Khalifa – primary artist
- Chevy Woods – featured artist
- Scott "Yarmov" Yarmovsky – project coordinator
- Daniel Zaidenstadt – assistant
- The Invasion – producer

== Charts ==
=== Weekly charts ===
Chart (2012–13)	Peak position
Australian Albums (ARIA)	99
Australian Hitseekers Albums (ARIA)	4
Australian Urban Albums (ARIA)	14
Belgian Albums (Ultratop Flanders)	102
Belgian Albums (Ultratop Wallonia)	104
Canadian Albums (Billboard)	14
French Albums (SNEP)	65
German Albums (Offizielle Top 100)	75
Japanese Albums (Oricon)	117
Swiss Albums (Schweizer Hitparade)	35
UK Albums (OCC)	105
UK R&B Albums (Official Charts)	10
US Billboard 200	2
US Top R&B/Hip Hop Albums	1

=== Year-end charts ===
Chart (2013)	Position
US Billboard 200	67
US Top R&B/Hip-Hop Albums	16

== Certifications ==
Region	Certification	Certified units/sales
United States (RIAA)	Platinum	1,000,000^{‡}
^{‡} Sales+streaming figures based on certification alone.

== Release history ==
Region	Date	Format(s)	Label
United States	December 4, 2012	CD, digital download	Atlantic, Rostrum
United States	January 29, 2013	Vinyl	Atlantic, Rostrum
