= On and On and Beyond =

EP by Mac Miller
- Released: March 29, 2011
- Genre: Hip-hop
- Length: 18:20
- Label: Rostrum

Mac Miller chronology
Best Day Ever (2011)	On and On and Beyond (2011)	I Love Life, Thank You (2011)

Singles from On and On and Beyond
- 1. "On and On" Released: March 29, 2011

On and On and Beyond is the debut extended play by American rapper Mac Miller. It was released digitally on March 29, 2011. The tracks "Another Night", and "Live Free" were previously released on Mac Miller's 2009 mixtape The High Life, while "Life Ain't Easy", and "In the Air" are taken from 2011's Best Day Ever. The EP entered the US Billboard 200 on April 16, 2011 at number 55 on the chart.

== Track listing ==
No.	Title	Producer(s)	Length
1.	"Put It On"	Kalvin & HOBBS	3:15
2.	"Live Free"	Jay Fish	3:13
3.	"On and On"	I.D. Labs; Andrew Dawson (co.)	3:10
4.	"Life Ain't Easy"	I.D. Labs	2:41
5.	"In the Air"	Ritz Reynolds	2:57
6.	"Another Night"	Matt Grover	2:56

== Charts ==
=== Weekly charts ===
Chart (2011)	Peak position
US Billboard 200	55
US Independent Albums (Billboard)	12
US Top R&B/Hip-Hop Albums (Billboard)	15
US Top Rap Albums (Billboard)	8

=== Year-end charts ===
Chart (2011)	Position
US Top R&B/Hip-Hop Albums (Billboard)	85
