= Frick Park Market =

Single by Mac Miller

from the album Blue Slide Park
- Released: August 18, 2011
- Recorded: 2011
- Studio: I.D. Labs
- Genre: Hip hop; alternative hip hop
- Length: 3:17
- Label: Rostrum
- Songwriters: Eric Dan; Jeremy Kulousek; Malcolm McCormick
- Producer: ID Labs

Mac Miller singles chronology
"Donald Trump" (2011)	"Frick Park Market" (2011)	"Party on Fifth Ave." (2011)

Music video
- "Frick Park Market" on YouTube

"Frick Park Market" is a song by American hip hop recording independent artist Mac Miller. It serves as the lead single from his debut album Blue Slide Park. It was released digitally on August 18, 2011 along with an accompanying music video.

== Background ==
The song is named after Frick Park Market, a food store in Mac Miller's hometown of Pittsburgh, Pennsylvania, at which the rapper once worked. The name coincides with the album title "Blue Slide Park" which is the name of one of the playgrounds in nearby Frick Park. The official music video to the song was filmed at the store. As of June 2025, the official music video has had over 47 million views on YouTube.

== Chart performance ==
The song entered the Billboard Hot 100 chart at number 60 on September 3, as well as reaching numbers 34 and 3 on the US Digital and, Top Heatseekers charts respectively. The single has sold over 150,000 units in the US.

== Track listing ==
Digital download
No.	Title	Length
1.	"Frick Park Market" (Explicit)	3:17
2.	"Frick Park Market" (Clean)	3:17

== Charts ==
Chart (2011)	Peak position
US Billboard Hot 100	60

== Certifications ==
Region	Certification	Certified units/sales
United States (RIAA)	Gold	500,000^{‡}
^{‡} Sales+streaming figures based on certification alone.
