= Taylor Allderdice (mixtape) =

Mixtape by Wiz Khalifa
- Released: March 13, 2012
- Recorded: 2011–12
- Genre: Hip hop
- Length: 61:08
- Label: Taylor Gang; Rostrum
- Producer: Ayo the Producer; Big Jerm; Cardo; Bugseed; Dumont; Harry Fraud; I.D. Labs; Jake One; Lex Luger; Rob Holladay; Sledgren; SpaceGhostPurrp; Sparky Banks

Wiz Khalifa chronology
Mac & Devin Go to High School (2011)	Taylor Allderdice (2012)	Cabin Fever 2 (2012)

Taylor Allderdice is the tenth mixtape by American rapper Wiz Khalifa, It was released on March 13, 2012. The 17-track mixtape was named after the high school which Wiz Khalifa attended. On April 20, 2022, over a decade after its initial release, the mixtape was re-released on streaming platforms, though alterations to some tracks were made.

== Critical reception ==
Professional ratings
Review scores
Source	Rating
Pitchfork	6.3/10
XXL	(XL)

Taylor Allderdice was met with generally favorable reviews from music critics. Adam Fleischer of XXL gave the mixtape an XL, saying, "He seems to truly be talking about how he lives and what he knows, and isn't that what we ask from our rappers—to just spit what is real to them from their experiences, rather than something contrived? Plus, he's damn good at it." Sowmya Krishnamurthy of HipHopDX said, "Wiz genuinely loves nouveau fame and relishes his king-size rolling papers, spending "30 racks" on champagne and a wife with a "pornographic figure." "When you living this high/you can't be afraid of heights," he raps fittingly on "My Favorite Song." The prodigal stoner, deservingly, takes his spoils." Joe Colly of Pitchfork gave the mixtape a 6.3 out of ten, saying "Songs about pot are fine, they have their place, but he's reached the level of popularity that it's reasonable to expect something more."

The mixtape was named the eighth best album of 2012 by Complex Magazine. That publication also named the track "My Favorite Song" which features Juicy J #36 of the best 50 songs of 2012.

== Track listing ==
No.	Title	Producer(s)	Length
1.	"Amber Ice"	I.D. Labs	2:43
2.	"California"	Cardo	3:07
3.	"Mia Wallace"	Dumont	2:59
4.	"Guilty Conscience"	Sparky Banks	3:48
5.	"Mary 3x"	Cardo	4:54
6.	"O.N.I.F.C."	Cardo; Sledgren	4:13
7.	"Nameless" (featuring Chevy Woods)	Bugseed	3:23
8.	"Never Been Part II" (featuring Amber Rose & Rick Ross)	Sledgren	3:49
9.	"The Cruise"	Big Jerm	4:16
10.	"Rowland" (featuring Smoke DZA)	Big Jerm	3:58
11.	"My Favorite Song" (featuring Juicy J)	Rob Holladay; Ayo the Producer (co.)	3:52
12.	"T.A.P." (featuring Juicy J)	SpaceGhostPurrp	4:23
13.	"The Code" (featuring Juicy J, Lola Monroe & Chevy Woods)	Lex Luger	2:40
14.	"The Grinder"	Jake One	2:26
15.	"Brainstorm"	Cardo	3:53
16.	"Number 16"	Dumont	3:05
17.	"Blindfolds" (featuring Juicy J)	Harry Fraud	3:39

Sample credits

- "Amber Ice" contains a sample from "Yesterday Princess" performed by Stanley Clarke.
- "Mia Wallace" contains a sample from "Wave" performed by Oscar Peterson.
- "O.N.I.F.C." contains a sample from "I Remember" performed by deadmau5 and Kaskade.
- "Nameless" contains a sample from "Travelog" performed by Bugseed.
- "Never Been Part II" contains a sample from "Secret of the Forest" performed by Yasunori Mitsuda.
- "The Cruise" contains a sample from "Acura Integurl" performed by Frank Ocean.
- "My Favorite Song" contains a sample from "Sex Intelligent (Remix)" performed by The-Dream.
- "The Code" contains a sample from "Ginseng Woman" performed by Eric Gale.
- "T.A.P." used the beat from "Ridin' in the Back" performed by Amber London, Ethelwulf, and Denzel Curry.
- "Number 16" contains a sample from "Les Fleurs" performed by Ramsey Lewis.
- "Blindfolds" contains a sample from "The Last Unicorn" performed by Caravan.
