= Party on Fifth Ave. =

Single by Mac Miller

from the album Blue Slide Park
- Released: October 28, 2011
- Recorded: 2011
- Genre: Hip hop
- Length: 2:53
- Label: Rostrum
- Songwriters: Hank Ballard; Malcolm McCormick; Eric Dan; Jeremy Kulousek; Charles Spurling
- Producer: ID Labs

Mac Miller singles chronology
"Frick Park Market" (2011)	"Party on Fifth Ave." (2011)	"Middle Finger" (2012)

Music video
- "Party on Fifth Ave" on YouTube

"Party on Fifth Ave." is a song by American hip hop artist Mac Miller and the second single from his debut album, Blue Slide Park. The I.D. Labs-produced track was released digitally on October 28, 2011, along with an accompanying music video.

== Background ==
"Party on Fifth Ave." is a hip hop song. It features a sample of the main loop from DJ Mark the 45 King's 1987 song "The 900 Number". The same loop was used by DJ Kool for his single "Let Me Clear My Throat" in 1996. The original source of the loop is Marva Whitney's 1967 funky soul track "Unwind Yourself."

The song's music video features Mac Miller and his crew dressed as elderly men, complete with mobility scooters and canes. The video was directed by Ian Wolfson.

When the Pittsburgh Penguins win a home game, the song is played over loudspeakers of PPG Paints Arena.

== Track listing ==
Digital download
No.	Title	Length
1.	"Party on Fifth Ave." (Explicit)	2:53
2.	"Party on Fifth Ave." (Clean)	2:53

== Chart performance ==
The song entered the Billboard Hot 100 chart at #64 on November 10, as well as reaching #4 on the Top Heatseekers charts.

== Charts ==
=== Weekly charts ===
Chart (2011–12)	Peak position
US Billboard Hot 100	64
US Heatseekers Songs (Billboard)	4

== Certifications ==
Region	Certification	Certified units/sales
United States (RIAA)	Gold	500,000^{^}
^{^} Shipments figures based on certification alone.
