= Loud (Mac Miller song) =

Single by Mac Miller

from the album Macadelic
- Released: March 2, 2012
- Recorded: 2011
- Studio: I.D. Labs
- Genre: Psychedelic hip hop; electronic rap
- Length: 3:01
- Label: Rostrum
- Songwriters: Eric Dan; Jeremy Kulousek; Malcolm McCormick; Zachary Vaughan
- Producers: Big Jerm; Sayez

Mac Miller singles chronology
"Middle Finger" (2012)	"Loud" (2012)	"The Way" (2013)

"Loud" is a song by American rapper Mac Miller, and the lead single from his mixtape Macadelic (2012). It was written by Miller, Eric Dan, Jeremy Kulousek, and Zachary Vaughan, and produced by Big Jerm and Sayez. It was released on March 2, 2012, by Rostrum Records. The music video was released on March 23, 2012.

== Background and release ==
"Loud" was written by Mac Miller, Eric Dan, Jeremy Kulousek, and Zachary Vaughan, and produced by Big Jerm and Sayez at ID Labs. The song was released digitally by Rostrum Records on March 2, 2012, as the lead single from Miller's mixtape Macadelic (2012).

== Music video ==
The music video for "Loud" was released on March 23, 2012, the same day Macadelic was released. Directed by Ian Wolfson, the video includes Miller rapping his verse alongside several masked dancers in a dark-lit studio. At the beginning of the video, Miller sips from a glow-in-the-dark cup that says "Don't Do Drugs".

== Remix ==
A remix of "Loud", featuring British rapper Benny Banks, was released by Rostrum Records on May 28, 2012.

== Track listing ==
Digital download – Loud
No.	Title	Length
1.	"Loud" (Explicit)	3:01
2.	"Loud" (Clean)	3:01

Digital download – Loud (Remix)
No.	Title	Length
1.	"Loud" (featuring Benny Banks)	3:51

== Charts ==
=== Weekly charts ===
Chart (2012)	Peak position
Canada (Canadian Hot 100)	71
US Billboard Hot 100	53
US Heatseekers Songs (Billboard)	1

== Certifications ==
Region	Certification	Certified units/sales
United States (RIAA)	Platinum	1,000,000^{‡}
^{‡} Sales+streaming figures based on certification alone.
