= I Love Life, Thank You =

Mixtape by Mac Miller
- Released: October 14, 2011
- Length: 37:14
- Label: Self-released
- Producer: 9th Wonder; Big Jerm; Black Diamond; Cardo; Clams Casino; Brandun DeShay; E Dan; Like; Mac Miller

Mac Miller chronology
On and On and Beyond (2011)	I Love Life, Thank You (2011)	Blue Slide Park (2011)

Professional ratings
Review scores
Source	Rating
XXL	XL

I Love Life, Thank You is the sixth mixtape by American recording artist Mac Miller. In 2011, Miller started the "Road 2 a Million Fans" series, during which he released a new song for every 100,000 Twitter followers he accumulated. On October 14, 2011, he released I Love Life, Thank You upon reaching one million followers. Seven of the thirteen tracks on the mixtape had previously been released throughout the course of the series. On July 22, 2022, the mixtape was re-released to all streaming services.

== Promotion ==
On April 17, 2011, upon reaching 300,000 followers on Twitter, Miller released the song "People Under the Stairs" and started the "Road 2 a Million Fans" campaign. "Love Lost" was released on May 19, upon reaching 400,000 followers. Upon reaching 500,000 followers, "Family First", which features Talib Kweli, was released on June 20. On July 15, he reached 600,000 followers and released "Just a Kid". Upon reaching 700,000 followers on August 7, Miller released "The Miller Family Reunion. Miller reached 800,000 followers on August 26 and released "Cold Feet". On September 20, he reached 900,000 followers and released "Willie Dynamite".

== Track listing ==
I Love Life, Thank You track listing
No.	Title	Producer(s)	Length
1.	"I Love Life, Thank You"	Brandun DeShay	3:43
2.	"People Under the Stairs"	Thes One	1:34
3.	"Willie Dynamite"	Big Jerm	3:58
4.	"The Scoop on Heaven"	9th Wonder	2:42
5.	"Love Lost"	Black Diamond	2:44
6.	"Pranks 4 Players" (featuring Sir Michael Rocks)	Cardo	3:04
7.	"Cold Feet"	Clams Casino	1:36
8.	"Family First" (featuring Talib Kweli)	Like	2:09
9.	"The Miller Family Reunion"	Big Jerm	2:40
10.	"Boom Bap Rap" (featuring The Come Up)	Mac Miller; Big Jerm	3:27
11.	"Just a Kid"	E Dan	2:48
12.	"All That" (featuring Bun B)	E Dan	3:16
13.	"All This"	E Dan	3:33
Total length:			37:14

Sample credits

- "I Love Life, Thank You" contains a sample of "How I Know" by Toro y Moi.
- "People Under the Stairs" contains a sample of "San Francisco Knights" by People Under the Stairs.
- "Love Lost" contains a sample of "Love Lost" by The Temper Trap.
- "The Miller Family Reunion" contains a sample of "Yes it's You" by "Sweet" Charles Sherrell

== Credits and personnel ==
Credits adapted from DatPiff.

- Mac Miller – primary artist (all tracks); production (track 10)
- 9th Wonder – production (track 4)
- Big Jerm – production (tracks 3, 9, 10)
- Black Diamond – production (track 5)
- Bun B – featured artist (track 12)
- Cardo – production (track 6)
- Clams Casino – production (track 7)
- Brandun DeShay – production (track 1)
- E. Dan – production (tracks 11, 12, 13)
- Like – production (track 8)
- Talib Kweli – featured artist (track 8)
- Sir Michael Rocks – featured artist (track 6)
- Noam Wallenberg – engineer (tracks 1, 6)
- The Come Up — featured artist (track 10)

== Charts ==
Chart performance for I Love Life, Thank You
Chart (2022–2025)	Peak position
Belgian Albums (Ultratop Flanders)	99
Canadian Albums (Billboard)	46
Dutch Albums (Album Top 100)	21
Lithuanian Albums (AGATA)	46
New Zealand Albums (RMNZ)	33
Swiss Albums (Schweizer Hitparade)	67
Scottish Albums (OCC)	76
UK Independent Albums (OCC)	36
UK R&B Albums (OCC)	10
US Billboard 200	22
US Independent Albums (Billboard)	5
US Top R&B/Hip-Hop Albums (Billboard)	12

== Certifications ==
Certifications for I Love Life, Thank You
Region	Certification	Certified units/sales
New Zealand (RMNZ)	Gold	7,500^{‡}
^{‡} Sales+streaming figures based on certification alone.
