= Best Day Ever (mixtape) =

Mixtape by Mac Miller
- Released: March 11, 2011
- Genre: Hip-hop
- Length: 51:26
- Label: Rostrum
- Producer: ID Labs; Teddy Roxpin; Sap; Beans N Kornbread; Chuck Inglish; Just Blaze; Blue (of The Sore Losers); Ritz Reynolds; Khrysis

Mac Miller chronology
| K.I.D.S. (2010) | Best Day Ever (2011) | On and On and Beyond (2011) |

Singles from Best Day Ever
- 1. "Donald Trump" Released: May 17, 2011

Best Day Ever is the fifth mixtape by American rapper Mac Miller. It was released by Rostrum Records on March 11, 2011, as the follow-up to Miller's acclaimed mixtape K.I.D.S. (2010). The mixtape consists of sixteen songs produced by nine producers (predominantly ID Labs), and includes features from rappers Wiz Khalifa and Phonte.

Four songs from Best Day Ever have music videos: "Donald Trump", "Get Up", "Wear My Hat" and "Best Day Ever".

== Release and promotion ==
Over 20,000 viewers joined Miller for a live video stream prior to the mixtape's release. As of March 2019, the mixtape has received over 1.2 million downloads and 1.5 million streams on its official host, DatPiff. The song "Donald Trump" was released as a single on May 17, 2011. It became his first singles entry on the US Billboard Hot 100, peaking at number 75, and was certified platinum by the Recording Industry Association of America (RIAA). Its music video has received over 180 million views on YouTube, and is Miller's most-viewed video. When the video surpassed 16 million views, Donald Trump acknowledged the song on the social networking site Twitter, stating "Who wouldn't be flattered?".

In June 2016, Best Day Ever was remastered and commercially released by Rostrum Records for its fifth anniversary.

== Critical reception ==
Professional ratings
Review scores
| Source | Rating |
|---|---|
| Allmusic | 4/5 stars |

The mixtape received favorable reviews, including an "XL" (second highest) from XXL magazine.

== Commercial performance ==
Following Miller's death on September 7, 2018, Best Day Ever debuted at number 26 on the US Billboard 200 with 17,000 album-equivalent units.

== Track listing ==
Credits adapted from DatPiff and Spotify.

| No. | Title | Writer(s) | Producer(s) | Length |
|---|---|---|---|---|
| 1. | "Best Day Ever" | Anthony Gerard Gonzalez; Eric Dan; Jeremy Kulousek; Malcolm McCormick | ID Labs | 2:39 |
| 2. | "Get Up!" | Giorgio Moroder; McCormick; Theo Ross Rosenthal | Teddy Roxpin | 2:38 |
| 3. | "Donald Trump" | Jonathan King; McCormick; Sufjan Stevens | Sap | 2:44 |
| 4. | "Oy Vey" | Dan; Jona Bechtolt; Khaela Maricich; McCormick | ID Labs | 3:28 |
| 5. | "I'll Be There" (featuring Phonte) | DJ Johnson; Kenneth Roy; McCormick | Beans N Kornbread | 3:11 |
| 6. | "Wear My Hat" | Evan Ingersoll; McCormick | Chuck Inglish | 4:00 |
| 7. | "Wake Up" | Dan; Kulousek; King; McCormick | Sap; ID Labs | 3:54 |
| 8. | "All Around the World" | Al Puodziukas; Jesse Keeler; John Stephens; Justin Smith; McCormick; Nick Dresti | Just Blaze; Black Diamond^{[a]} | 3:41 |
| 9. | "Down the Rabbit Hole" | Benjamin Hazelgrove; Brandon Blue; Edward Wendler; Jeffrey Maccora; Kehinde Hassan; McCormick; Taiwo Hassan; William Lane Shaw | Blue (of The Sore Losers) | 3:13 |
| 10. | "In the Air" | Brent Reynolds; McCormick | Ritz Reynolds | 2:53 |
| 11. | "Play Ya Cards" | Ingersoll; McCormick | Chuck Inglish | 2:18 |
| 12. | "She Said" | Christopher Tyson; McCormick | Khrysis | 2:46 |
| 13. | "Life Ain't Easy" | Dan; Kulousek; McCormick | ID Labs | 2:37 |
| 14. | "Snooze" | Brian Eno; Dan; Kulousek; McCormick; Roger Eno | ID Labs | 2:49 |
| 15. | "Keep Floatin'" (featuring Wiz Khalifa) | Arhur Lee; Cameron Thomaz; Charles Miller; Dan; Harold Brown; Howard Scott; Kulousek; Lee Levitin; Leroy Jordan; McCormick; Morris Dickerson; Thomas Allen | ID Labs | 4:13 |
| 16. | "BDE Bonus" | Dan; Kulousek; McCormick; Maurice White | ID Labs | 4:12 |
| Total length: | | | | 51:26 |

Notes

- ^{^[a]} signifies an additional producer

== Charts ==
| Chart (2018) | Peak position |
|---|---|
| Belgian Albums (Ultratop Flanders) | 147 |
| Canadian Albums (Billboard) | 41 |
| US Billboard 200 | 26 |
