= Blue Slide Park =

Studio album by Mac Miller
- Released: November 8, 2011
- Recorded: 2010–2011
- Studios: ID Labs Studio (Pittsburgh, Pennsylvania)
- Genre: Hip-hop
- Length: 46:04
- Label: Rostrum
- Producers: Benjy Grinberg (exec.); ID Labs; Ritz Reynolds; Clams Casino; Young L; Mansions on the Moon; Mac Miller

Mac Miller chronology
I Love Life, Thank You (2011)	Blue Slide Park (2011)	Macadelic (2012)

Singles from Blue Slide Park
- 1. "Frick Park Market" Released: August 18, 2011; 2. "Party on Fifth Ave." Released: October 28, 2011; 3. "Up All Night" Released: November 15, 2011

Blue Slide Park is the debut studio album by American rapper Mac Miller. It was released on November 8, 2011, by Rostrum Records. The album is named after a section of Frick Park (known as "Blue Slide Park") in Pittsburgh, near where Miller lived. Much of the production was handled by ID Labs, and the album has no guest appearances.

Despite Blue Slide Park receiving mixed reviews from critics, it debuted at number one on the US Billboard 200 with 144,000 sales, making it the first independently distributed debut album to top the chart since 1995.

== Background and release ==
On July 5, 2011, Mac Miller announced Blue Slide Park on his YouTube channel. The tracks "Smile Back" and "Blue Slide Park" were released as non-singles on September 23 and October 13, respectively. The latter track was released to commemorate the album surpassing 25,000 pre-orders. The album cover art was designed by his older brother, Miller McCormick. Blue Slide Park was released by Rostrum Records on November 8, 2011.

== Singles ==
The album's first single, "Frick Park Market", was produced by ID Labs, and released alongside an accompanying music video on August 18, 2011. The song peaked at number 60 on the US Billboard Hot 100 chart. At the time, it was Miller's highest-charting single, surpassing "Donald Trump", which charted at number 75.

The second single, "Party on Fifth Ave.", also produced by ID Labs, was released on October 28, 2011, with an accompanying music video. The song debuted at number 64 on the Billboard Hot 100.

"Up All Night" was released as the third single digitally via iTunes on November 15, 2011. The song peaked at number 23 on the Billboard Bubbling Under Hot 100 chart.

== Critical reception ==
Professional ratings
Aggregate scores
Source	Rating
Metacritic	58/100
Review scores
Source	Rating
AllHipHop	6.5/10
AllMusic	3/5 stars
HipHopDX	3.5/5 stars
Pitchfork	1.0/10
RapReviews.com	6/10
Rolling Stone	2.5/5 stars
Spin	4/10
XXL	3/5 (L)

Blue Slide Park received generally mixed reviews from music critics. At Metacritic, a site that calculates an aggregate score based on a number of professional reviews, the album has received a score of 58/100 (based on 12 articles) which indicates "mixed or average reviews". Jon Garcia of AllHipHop.com gave the album a rating of 6.5 out of 10, criticising the production and claiming that "it's as if he hasn't found his sound yet". XXL viewed the album's production more positively, but noted that Miller still has "room to evolve". Jordan Sargent of Pitchfork gave the album a 1.0 out of 10 rating, and wrote "Miller's world is a hermetic one, and unless it's one you inhabit, the album holds no appeal", and "he's mostly just a crushingly bland, more intolerable version of Wiz Khalifa".

== Commercial performance ==
Blue Slide Park debuted at number one on the US Billboard 200 chart, selling 144,000 copies in its first week, making it the first independently distributed debut album to top the chart since Tha Dogg Pound's Dogg Food (1995). In its second week, the album fell to number 24 with 25,000 sales, one of the largest drops from number one at the time. Despite not being released as a single, the track "Smile Back" became Miller's highest-charting song at the time, reaching number 55 on the Billboard Hot 100 chart dated November 26, 2011. As of August 2012, the album has sold 344,000 copies.

On May 14, 2018, the album was certified gold by the Recording Industry Association of America (RIAA) for combined sales and streams in excess of 500,000 units in the United States. Blue Slide Park earned 12,000 album-equivalent units in the week following Miller's death on September 7, 2018, allowing the album to re-enter the Billboard 200 at number 49.

In Canada, the album debuted at number eight on the Canadian Albums Chart. On December 18, 2012, the album was certified gold by Music Canada (MC) for shipments exceeding 40,000 units in Canada.

== Track listing ==
Credits adapted from Tidal.

No.	Title	Writer(s)	Producer(s)	Length
1.	"English Lane"	Malcolm McCormick; Brent Reynolds	Ritz Reynolds	1:37
2.	"Blue Slide Park"	McCormick; Eric Dan; Jeremy Kulousek	ID Labs	2:29
3.	"Party on Fifth Ave."	McCormick; Dan; Kulousek	ID Labs	2:53
4.	"PA Nights"	McCormick; Benjamin Hazlegrove; William Lane Shaw	Mansions on the Moon	3:04
5.	"Frick Park Market"	McCormick; Dan; Kulousek	ID Labs	3:17
6.	"Smile Back"	McCormick; Dan; Kulousek	ID Labs	2:42
7.	"Under the Weather"	McCormick; Dan; Kulousek	ID Labs	4:20
8.	"Of the Soul"	McCormick; Dan; Kulousek	ID Labs	3:33
9.	"My Team"	McCormick; Michael Volpe	Clams Casino	2:25
10.	"Up All Night"	McCormick; Dan; Kulousek	Mac Miller; ID Labs	3:29
11.	"Loitering"	McCormick; Lloyd Ohmedhebo	Young L	3:11
12.	"Hole in My Pocket"	McCormick; Dan; Kulousek	ID Labs	0:35
13.	"Diamonds & Gold"	McCormick; Dan; Kulousek	ID Labs	3:17
14.	"Missed Calls"	McCormick; Reynolds	Ritz Reynolds	2:58
15.	"Man in the Hat"	McCormick; Dan; Reynolds	Ritz Reynolds; ID Labs	3:16
16.	"One Last Thing"	McCormick; Volpe	Clams Casino	2:58
Total length:				46:04

== Tour ==
=== Europe – The Incredibly Dope Tour ===
Miller toured Europe in early September 2011 to promote the album. The United Kingdom leg of The Incredibly Dope Tour ran from September 1 to 4, making up four dates in London, Manchester, Birmingham, and Glasgow. The tour also extended to mainland Europe, beginning in Amsterdam on September 6. Two dates in Paris were also announced, as well as Opwijk before Mac's return to the United States to perform at the 2011 edition of Rock the Bells in Boston. Later dates also saw Miller performing in Germany, and Scandinavia. He also performed at The National and other famous venues.

=== United States – Blue Slide Park Tour ===
Miller's tour of the United States ran from September to December 2011. The Blue Slide Park Tour began on September 22, 2011, at the Irving Plaza in Manhattan, New York City. The final date was on December 9, with Miller performing in his hometown of Pittsburgh.

== Charts ==
=== Weekly charts ===
Chart (2011)	Peak position
Belgian Albums (Ultratop Flanders)	185
Belgian Albums (Ultratop Wallonia)	178
Canadian Albums (Billboard)	8
Danish Albums (Hitlisten)	40
French Albums (SNEP)	175
US Billboard 200	1
US Top R&B/Hip-Hop Albums (Billboard)	1

=== Year-end charts ===
Chart (2012)	Position
US Billboard 200	179
US Top R&B/Hip-Hop Albums (Billboard)	27
Chart (2013)	Position
US Top R&B/Hip-Hop Albums (Billboard)	97

== Certifications ==
Region	Certification	Certified units/sales
Canada (Music Canada)	Gold	40,000^{^}
United States (RIAA)	Gold	500,000^{‡}
^{^} Shipments figures based on certification alone.^{‡} Sales+streaming figures based on certification alone.
