= ID Labs =

Recording studio in Pittsburgh, Pennsylvania

I.D. Labs
- Type: Recording studio
- Industry: Music
- Founded: 2003; 23 years ago
- Founder: E. Dan
- Headquarters: Pittsburgh, Pennsylvania, U.S.
- Website: idlabsmusic.com

ID Labs is a commercial recording studio and production facility, opened in 2003, owned and operated by Pittsburgh-based producer and engineer, Eric Dan. The engineer and producer team, composed of Jeremy "Big Jerm" Kulousek, Eric "E. Dan" Dan and Zachary "Sayez" Vaughan have previously and collectively gone under the name ID Labs. Most known for his extensive work with hip-hop artists Wiz Khalifa and Mac Miller, E. Dan has recorded, mixed, and/or produced several Gold and Platinum certified releases throughout his 20-year career in the music business.

As a studio, ID Labs has served as a home to other influential producers from Pittsburgh including Big Jerm, Sledgren, Sayez, Christo, Nice Rec, Dreamer, and others.

== Career ==
E. Dan began his career working as a DJ and recording engineer. He performed in and produced for the hip-hop group Strict Flow. After gaining attention in the local hip-hop scene, he opened the original ID Labs studio in 2004, located in Pittsburgh's Lawrenceville neighborhood. Big Jerm began making instrumentals in high school and attended audio engineering school in New York. E. Dan and Jerm met in 2008 when Jerm was dropping off recording session files at ID Labs for work he had been doing with Wiz Khalifa. Jerm interned at the studio and the two began making beats together. Sayez joined forces with the pair in 2010.

ID Labs began working with Wiz Khalifa during the creation of one of the rapper's early mixtapes. In exchange for extra recording time, E. Dan offered Khalifa a job at the studio sweeping floors and answering phones. The team recognized Khalifa's talent and began what would become a long-term working relationship. They would go on to produce Khalifa's first commercial single, "Say Yeah", which would go on to position 20 on the Billboard Chart. To date, ID Labs has produced a large percentage of Khalifa's commercially released material, including 6 tracks on Rolling Papers and 7 tracks on O.N.I.F.C.

Big Jerm met Mac Miller in 2009 via Myspace. Miller began recording at ID Labs studio at around age 16, which MTV.com states was "pivotal in Mac's development". After recording at the studio for about a year, he gained the attention of studio owner, E. Dan. From there Mac and E. made their first song together and what would be Miller's first single, "Knock Knock", which would go on to sell over 1 million copies worldwide. The team produced the majority of Miller's debut album, Blue Slide Park, which landed the number one spot on the Billboard Hot 100 and was the first independent album to do so since 1995. The team has produced a substantial portion of Miller's other work as well including hits such as "Weekend", "Self Care", and "Loud".

In July 2022, Los Angeles–based artist, Gustavo Zermeño Jr., traveled to Pittsburgh to honor the late Mac Miller by painting a mural on the side of I.D. Labs studio in Etna. The mural stands as a memorial for fans to visit and pay tribute to Miller.

In addition to Khalifa and Miller, ID Labs have worked with Snoop Dogg, Ariana Grande, Gucci Mane, Fall Out Boy, Juicy J, Ludacris, Logic, Pierre Bourne, Freddie Gibbs, Curren$y, J.I.D, Rob $tone, Snow Tha Product, Le'Veon Bell, Earthgang, Jimmy Wopo, Bun B, Rae Sremmurd, Lil Xan, John Cena, PARTYNEXTDOOR, and many others.
