= 2013 in hip-hop =

This article summarizes the events, album releases, and album release dates in hip-hop for the year 2013.

== Events ==
=== January ===
- On January 6, 2013, 23 year old rapper originated from Seattle, Washington who went by the stage name Freddy E sent a series of dark, depressing tweets which then follows up with his very last tweets saying ‘I love you mum’, ‘I love you dad’ and ‘I love you Katherine’. He then proceeded to take his own life by shooting himself in the head with a rifle not long after.
- T.I. completed his 10-year contract with Atlantic Records, and is seeking a deal around $75 million for him and his Grand Hustle Records artists.
- On January 20, 2013, Lupe Fiasco was removed from the stage by security after making anti-Obama comments in Washington D.C., during Obama's second presidential inauguration.
- On January 23, 2013, Hit-Boy confirmed he signed with Interscope Records.
- On January 25, 2013, Juelz Santana was sentenced to two years probation for threatening to kill his neighbor after his neighbor intervened and called the police when he heard Juelz assaulting his then girlfriend.
- On January 28, 2013, Rick Ross crashed his car in Fort Lauderdale after his vehicle was shot at in a drive by shooting.
- Jay-Z officially signed Timbaland to Roc Nation.
- On January 30, 2013, Vado confirmed he signed with DJ Khaled's We the Best Music Group label.

=== February ===
- On February 8, 2013, Paul Rosenberg confirmed Eminem's eighth album would be released in 2013, post Memorial Day.
- Drake won his first Grammy Award for Best Rap Album at the 2013 Grammy Awards for Take Care. At the same night, Jay-Z and Kanye West would each take three Grammys; two for Niggas in Paris and one for No Church in the Wild.
- On February 18, 2013, Kollegah and Farid Bang topped the German album charts with their collabo album Jung, brutal, gutaussehend 2 selling 80,000 copies in the release week. It is the highest number for a hip-hop album in Germany for the last five years.
- According to Billboard, Jay-Z and his Roc Nation imprint signed a "worldwide publishing administration deals with Warner/Chappell Music," giving Jay-Z the rights back to his music post-Def Jam (The Blueprint 3, Watch The Throne) as well as future works, with most of his older catalog moving to the Warner umbrella within the year. A separate deal will put the past and future catalogs of Roc Nation's stable of artists on the publisher's roster immediately, including songwriters Philip Lawrence (Bruno Mars, Flo Rida, Cee-Lo Green), S1 (Kanye West, Beyoncé, 50 Cent), Carmen Key (Flo Rida, David Guetta), and British singer Rita Ora, among others.
- C-Murder's appeal was rejected and he will remain in prison to serve out his life sentence due to a second degree murder committed in 2002.
- Suge Knight has had two warrants for his arrest approved stating he can be arrested on the spot.
- Ja Rule has been released from prison for his possession of an illegal firearm charge but still has time to serve for tax evasion.
- Gunplay avoided his possible life sentence, and any jail time at all, due to the victim not cooperating and authenticating the video surveillance of him holding the victim up with a gun, and stealing a cellphone and gold chain.
- On February 25, 2013, Atlanta rapper Young Vito, was acquitted of murdering 1017 Brick Squad rapper Slim Dunkin. However, he was given 25 years for aggravated assault and possession of a firearm.

=== March ===
- On March 1, 2013, former No Limit Records rapper Mr. Magic and his wife were killed in a car accident in Mississippi, their daughter who was with them at the time survived the crash. Magic was 37 years old at the time of his death.
- Gunshots were fired near French Montana's tour bus when he was parked and chilling with fans and rapper Meek Mill in Philadelphia, a 27-year-old male was fatally shot in the stomach and was rushed to the hospital being pronounced DOA.
- Method Man announced on stage that the Wu-Tang Clan are working on a sixth studio album, that will be released this year to celebrate the 20th anniversary of the release of their debut album, Enter the Wu-Tang (36 Chambers).
- On March 12, 2013 Lil Wayne suffered multiple seizures after shooting a music video in Los Angeles. He would be released later the same day. Three days later he would be hospitalized again after another seizure, Thus causing TMZ to state he was in a medically induced coma and being in critical condition. YMCMB members Mack Maine, Birdman, Jay Sean and a slew of industry friends such as T.I. would later deny these reports, and say he was in "good condition" and awake.
- On March 14, 2013, Chief Keef was released from a juvenile detention center after serving 60 days for violating his probation.
- On March 16, 2013, Veteran California rapper Tone Loc collapsed on stage after finishing a song at the Bridge Bash concert in Des Moines, Iowa.
- Cleveland Rapper Machine Gun Kelly took home the 2013 MtvU "Woodie of the Year" award at the 2013 MTV Woodie Awards.
- On March 22, 2013, Atlanta Police issued an arrest warrant for Radric Davis, aka Gucci Mane, after he apparently assaulted a soldier with a champagne bottle.
- On March 29, 2013, Crypt the Warchild of OuterSpace announced he was diagnosed with cancer.
- Diddy was announced to be the musical guest for WrestleMania 29 at which he would perform a medley of songs on PPV inside New Jersey's MetLife Stadium on April 7.

=== April ===
- Tyler, The Creator released his 2nd studio album Wolf
- Kid Cudi revealed that he left Kanye West's GOOD Music record label, on good terms.
- On April 3, 2013, at approximately 2 AM, Power 105.1's host DJ Clue was arrested for drug possession and traffic violations.
- Logic signs to Def Jam Recordings.
- Kurupt announced that Tha Dogg Pound and Bone Thugs-N-Harmony are working on a collaboration album that will include all members of both groups along with Snoop Dogg and Soopafly.

=== May ===
- On May 1, Chris Kelly of hip hop duo Kris Kross died at the age of 34.
- On May 3, record producer AraabMuzik was shot in an attempted robbery in his neighborhood, and taken to the hospital where he is recovering.
- On May 6, 90s hip hop group Naughty By Nature announced that they were splitting up.
- On May 8, Gucci Mane announced Chief Keef was officially signed to his 1017 Brick Squad Records.
- Kanye West announced that his sixth studio album Yeezus would be released on June 18. J. Cole would move up the release date of his second album Born Sinner to that same date.
- On May 23, it was reported that rapper Tim Dog might have faked his death in order to not pay back money after being convicted of fraud.

=== June ===
- On June 2, Papoose "crashed" Hot 97's Summer Jam following Kendrick Lamar's set performing his single "Get At Me" with Ron Browz.
- On June 9, 2 Chainz was robbed at gunpoint in San Francisco of his phone and wallet. Two days later while boarding a flight from LAX, TSA agents found that his checked bag contained marijuana and promethazine. He was arrested and booked on felony narcotics possession.
- On June 14, Kanye West's Yeezus leaked online in its entirety. It was the last of the June 18 album releases to leak as Born Sinner and Mac Miller's Watching Movies with the Sound Off had leaked earlier in the month.
- On June 16, through an advertisement for Samsung shown during the 2013 NBA Finals, Jay-Z announced that he will release a new album titled Magna Carta Holy Grail on July 4.
- On June 20, Dream Chasers Records artist Lil Snupe was murdered in Winnfield, Louisiana.
- Kanye West's sixth studio album Yeezus debuts at #1 on the Billboard 200 with 328,800 copies, beating out J. Cole's Born Sinner which debuted at #2 with 297,922 copies and Mac Miller's Watching Movies with the Sound Off which debuted at #3 with 101,795 copies.
- On June 22, Drake released four new songs, and announced the release date for his third album Nothing Was the Same.
- On June 28, Meek Mill was ordered to take etiquette classes in order to tighten up on his social media skills and better articulate his business dealings, after some of his fans threatened his PO on Twitter.

=== July ===
- On July 8, rapper Wiz Khalifa officially married his girlfriend Amber Rose.
- On July 25, DJ Khaled publicly "proposed" to fellow Cash Money artist Nicki Minaj via MTV. He supported his offer with a 10 karat diamond ring from Rafaello & Co., valued at about $500,000. However it was later revealed it was all a ploy to debut his new single "I Wanna Be with You".

=== August ===
- On August 13, Big Sean released a leftover track from his sophomore album Hall of Fame, "Control" which features Kendrick Lamar and Jay Electronica. Kendrick's verse caused controversy as he "called out" J. Cole, Big K.R.I.T., Wale, Pusha T, Meek Mill, A$AP Rocky, Drake, Big Sean, Jay Electronica, Tyler, the Creator, and Mac Miller and called himself the "King of New York". Many rappers took offense to the lines without even being mentioned by name. Rappers including Lupe Fiasco, Papoose, Joell Ortiz, Cassidy, Joe Budden, A$AP Ferg, J.R. Writer, Mickey Factz, Mysonne, Bizarre, and Fred the Godson all released a response or a diss song within a week.
- On August 25, it was announced during the 2013 MTV Video Music Awards that Eminem would release the sequel of the commercial and critically successful The Marshall Mathers LP, The Marshall Mathers LP 2 on November 5, 2013.
- On August 26, Fat Joe reported federal prison in Florida to serve a 4-month sentence for tax evasion.

=== September ===
- On September 16, Young Money Entertainment president Mack Maine was charged with sexual battery and assault in Oklahoma. According to court documents obtained by TMZ alleged that, Maine put his hand down one woman's shirt without her consent. Then while the women were trying to leave, Mack Maine reportedly held the door shut and also punched and broke one of the female's jaw.
- On September 19, it was announced that the first theatrically released Tupac Shakur biopic will begin production in 2014.
- On September 19, Greek rapper Pavlos Fyssas who went by the stage name Killah P, was stabbed to death. Riots broke out throughout Greece due to the assumed political influences in the killing.
- On September 26, Chicago drill rapper LA Capone was shot and tragically bled out after leaving a recording studio.
- On September 27, former UGK Records artist, Ivory P was arrested on human trafficking and kidnapping charges, for kidnapping a 19-year-old woman to traffic out as sexual escort.

=== October ===
- On October 8, Nipsey Hussle released his mixtape Crenshaw for free online, and in a limited 1,000 physical copies for $100 each. He sold out all the copies earning over 100,000 dollars in one day.
- On October 12, The Game following his official release from Interscope Records signed to Cash Money Records.
- On October 15, Future was dropped off of Drake's third headlining tour Would You like a Tour? after he made negative comments about Drake and his album in a Billboard interview. It was also reported he was demanding $1.5 million for lost wages, as he was set to get $40,000 per gig. He was subsequently replaced with Jhené Aiko on every date of the tour. Two days later, Future rejoined the tour and drops the lawsuit.

=== November ===
- On November 7, Eminem became the first artist since The Beatles, to be the lead artist with four songs in the top 20 of the Billboard Hot 100 during the same week ("The Monster" at #3, "Berzerk" at #15, "Survival" at #16, "Rap God" at #17).
- On November 15, it was revealed that after Kendrick Lamar was named GQ's "Rapper of the Year" and interviewed for the issue, Top Dawg Entertainment's CEO Anthony "Top Dawg" Tiffith took issue with the article and the interview, then pulling Kendrick Lamar from his performance at GQ's annual Man Of The Year party that took place on, November 12, 2013.
- On November 22, T.I. announced his signing to Columbia Records.

=== December ===
- Jay-Z has the most Grammy nominations for the 56th Annual Grammy Awards with 9. Kendrick Lamar, Macklemore, and Pharrell each have 7 nominations while Drake has 5 nominations. Also, T.I. and Kanye West each have 2 Grammy nominations.
- Eminem is now tied with the record of most Billboard Hot 100 #1's among rappers with Diddy and Ludacris with 5, with "The Monster" peaking at #1.
- On December 17, Pharrell signed to Columbia Records as a solo artist and announced that he would release his second album on the label during 2014.
- On December 20, Three 6 Mafia member and DJ Paul's brother Lord Infamous died from a heart attack.
- On December 28, Grand Hustle Records and Interscope Records artist Doe B was shot and killed outside of a nightclub in his home state of Alabama along with two other bystanders being killed and six others injured.
- On December 29, Waka Flocka Flame's little brother and Brick Squad Monopoly artist KayO Redd died from an apparent suicide in Atlanta.

== Released albums ==
Release Date	Artist(s)	Album	Record label(s)	Notes
January 4	MC Eiht	Keep It Hood	Bluestamp Music Group	
January 4	Penny	Twenties Hungry: The Unbound Anthems of Yesteryear	Fake Four Inc.	
January 15	ASAP Rocky	Long. Live. ASAP	A$AP Worldwide, Polo Grounds, RCA Records	Debuted at No. 1 on the Billboard 200; Singles: "Goldie", "Fuckin' Problems", "Wild for the Night"
January 15	DJ Muggs	Bass for Your Face	Ultra Records	
January 15	Sho Baraka	Talented 10th	Lions and Liars	Debuted at No. 94 on the Billboard 200; Singles include: "Chapter 6: Ali", "Chapter 9: Jim Crow"
January 15	Wax	Continue	Scrublife	Debuted at #3 on the Billboard Heatseekers Album Chart; Singles include: "Toothbrush", "Lewis & Clark", "We Can't All Be Heroes"
January 22	Young Fathers	Tape One	Anticon	
January 29	Slum Village & Mick Boogie	Dirty Slums 2	Synchronization	
January 29	Oh No	Disrupted Ads	Kash Roc Entertainment	
January 29	Vast Aire	A Space Iliad EP	Man Bites Dog Records	
February 4	Devlin	A Moving Picture	Island, Universal Music Group	Debuted at No. 19 on the UK Albums Chart; Singles: "Watchtower", "Off With Their Heads", "Rewind"
February 5	Brotha Lynch Hung	Mannibalector	Strange Music	Debuted at No. 67 on the Billboard 200; Singles: "Meat Cleaver", "Krocadil"
February 5	Edo G	Intelligence & Ignorance	Envision Entertainment	
February 5	Joe Budden	No Love Lost	Mood Muzik Entertainment, E1 Music	Debuted at No. 15 on the Billboard 200; Singles: "She Don't Put It Down", "NBA"
February 5	Young Noble & Deuce Deuce	Fast Life	Concrete Enterprises, Outlaw Recordz	
February 8	Kollegah & Farid Bang	Jung, brutal, gutaussehend 2	Selfmade Records	Debuted at No. 1 on the German Charts, Austrian Charts, Swiss Charts; Singles include: "Dynamit", "Drive-By", "Du kennst den Westen", "Stiernackenkommando"; Certified Gold in Germany
February 10	Noah23	Tropical Fruit	Plague Language / Legendary Entertainment	
February 12	Chamillionaire	Elevate EP	Chamillitary Entertainment	Only released 1,000 hard copies which sold out in 10 hours prior to announcement.
February 12	Kay the Aquanaut & Factor Chandelier	Letters from Laika	Circle Into Square	
February 12	Ras Kass	Barmageddon	Cre8yte Corporation	
February 12	Serengeti	Saal	Graveface	
February 13	Hussein Fatal	The Interview: It's Not a Gimmik 2 Me	Thugtertainment	
February 15	Araabmuzik	For Professional Use Only	Duke Productions	
February 19	Czarface	Czarface	Brick Records	Debuted at #34 on US Billboard Top R&B/Hip-Hop Albums
February 19	Sadistik	Flowers for My Father	Fake Four Inc.	Singles: "Micheal","City in Amber", "Kill the King", "Russian Roulette"
February 19	MED, Blu & Madlib	The Burgundy	Stones Throw Records	
February 22	Fard	Bellum et Pax	Code Rouge	Debuted at No. 2 on the German Charts, #14 Austrian Charts, #7 Swiss Charts; Singles include: "Madar"
February 25	Killah Priest	The Psychic World of Walter Reed	Proverbs Records	
February 26	Cappadonna	Eyrth, Wynd and Fyre	RBC Records	
February 26	Gensu Dean & Planet Asia	Abrasions	Mello Music Group	
February 26	Ill Bill	The Grimy Awards	Fat Beats Records	
February 26	Kutt Calhoun	Black Gold	Strange Music	Debuted at No. 120 on US Billboard 200; Singles: "Self Preservation", "I Been Dope"
February 26	The Regime	The Last Dragon	Smoke-A-Lot Records, City Hall Records	
February 26	Tonedeff	Glutton	QN5 Inc.	
March 4	Johnny Polygon	The Nothing	Johnny Polygon	
March 5	Demigodz	Killmatic	Dirty Version LLC	
March 12	Krayzie Bone	QuickFix: Less Drama. More Music	TheLifeApparel	
March 19	Ra Scion	Adding to the Extra	SCIONtific Records	
March 19	The Regime	Dragon Gang	Smoke-A-Lot Records, RBC Records	
March 19	Swollen Members	Beautiful Death Machine	Suburban Noize, Battle Axe Records	Debuted at No. 137 on the Billboard Hot 100.
March 22	Adil Omar	The Mushroom Cloud Effect	Serpents of Eden	Singles: "Off The Handle", "Paki Rambo"
March 22	Tede	Elliminati	Wielkie Joł	Debuted at No. 3 on the Polish Charts; Singles include: "Mainstream", "Nie banglasz"; Certified Gold in Poland
March 26	Blu	York	Nature Sounds	
March 26	Ces Cru	Constant Energy Struggles	Strange Music	
March 26	Durag Dynasty	360 Waves	Nature Sounds	
March 26	Lil Wayne	I Am Not a Human Being II	Young Money Entertainment, Cash Money Records, Republic Records	Debuted at No. 2 on the Billboard 200.; Singles: "My Homies Still", "No Worries", "Bitches Love Me", "Rich As Fuck".; Certified Gold by the RIAA.
March 26	Papoose	The Nacirema Dream	Honor B4 Money Records, Fontana Distribution	Debuted at No. 97 on the Billboard 200.; Singles: "On Top of My Game", "What's My Name", "Get At Me".
March 29	Binary Star	Binary Star EP	Infinite Rhythm Network, Subterraneous Records	
March 31	Hell Razah	Living After Death	Hell Razah Music	
April 1	Wiley	The Ascent	Warner Music Group	
April 2	Kidz in the Hall	Wishful Drinking	March Records	
April 2	Tyler, The Creator	Wolf	Odd Future Records, RED Distribution, Sony Music Entertainment	Debuted at No. 3 on the Billboard 200; Singles: "Domo23"
April 9	Tyga	Hotel California	Young Money Entertainment, Cash Money Records, Republic Records	Debuted at No. 7 on Billboard 200; Singles: "Dope", "Molly", "For the Road", "Show You"
April 9	Rich Boy	Break the Pot	Vice Records, E1 Music	Singles: "Break the Pot"
April 9	Goondox (Snowgoons, PMD & Sean Strange)	Welcome to the Goondox	RBC Records	
April 16	Andy Mineo	Heroes For Sale	Reach	Debuted at No. 11 on the Billboard 200
April 16	Ghostface Killah	Twelve Reasons to Die	Soul Temple Records, RED Distribution	Debuted at No. 27 on the Billboard 200
April 16	Homeboy Sandman	Kool Herc: Fertile Crescent	Stones Throw	
April 16	Illogic & Blockhead	Capture the Sun	Man Bites Dog Records	
April 16	Kid Cudi	Indicud	Wicked Awesome, GOOD Music, Republic Records	Debuted at No. 2 on the Billboard 200; Singles: "Just What I Am", "King Wizard", "Immortal", "Girls"
April 16	Mathematics	Prelude to the Answer	Money Maker Entertainment	
April 16	N.O.R.E.	Student of the Game	Militainment Business, Conglomerate, E1 Music	Debuted at No. 116 on the Billboard 200; Singles: "Tadow", "Fowl Niggaz", "The Problem (Lawwddd)"
April 16	Styles P	Float	Nature Sounds, High Times Records	Debuted at No. 124 on the Billboard 200; Singles: "Hater Love"
April 16	Slaine	The Boston Project	Suburban Noize Records	Debuted at No. 10 on the Billboard Heatseekers Album Chart
April 20	Wiz Khalifa & Currensy	Live in Concert	Jet life, Rostrum	Debuted at No. 30 on the Billboard 200; iTunes exclusive
April 23	k-os	Black on Blonde	Crown Loyalist, EMI	
April 23	Mitchy Slick, The Worlds Freshest	Feet Match the Paint	Fresh In The Flesh, Wrongkind Records	
April 23	Slim Thug	Welcome to Texas EP	Hogg Life Entertainment	
April 23	Snoop Lion	Reincarnated	Berhane Sound System, Mad Decent, Vice Records, RCA Records	Debuted at No. 16 on the Billboard 200; Singles: "La La La", "No Guns Allowed", "Ashtrays and Heartbreaks"
April 23	will.i.am	#willpower	Interscope Records	Debuted at No. 9 on the Billboard 200; Singles: "This is Love", "Scream and Shout", "#thatPOWER"
April 30	LL Cool J	Authentic	S-BRO Music Group, 429 Records	Debuted at No. 23 on the Billboard 200; Singles: "Take It", "Whaddup" and "We Came to Party"
April 30	Prolyphic & Buddy Peace	Working Man	Strange Famous	
April 30	R.A. the Rugged Man	Legends Never Die	Nature Sounds	Debuted at No. 121 on the Billboard 200; Singles include: "The Peoples Champ", "Learn Truth"
April 30	Rittz	The Life and Times of Jonny Valiant	Strange Music	Debuted at No. 25 on the Billboard 200; Singles: "Switch Lanes"
May 1	Sole	No Wising Up No Settling Down	Black Canyon	
May 7	Havoc	13	Nature Sounds	Singles: "Tell Me To My Face", "Gone", "Life We Chose"
May 7	Qwel & Maker	Beautiful Raw	Galapagos4	
May 7	Talib Kweli	Prisoner of Conscious	Javotti Media, EMI Music, Capitol Records	Debuted at No. 48 on the Billboard 200; Singles: "Push Thru", "Upper Echelon", "Come Here"
May 7	Young Noble & Gage Gully	The Year of the Underdogz	A.G.E. Entertainment	
May 13	Mike Stud	Relief	Electric Pop	Debuted at No. 109 on the Billboard 200
May 14	Eve	Lip Lock	From The Rib, RED Distribution	Debuted at No. 46 on the Billboard 200; Singles: "She Bad Bad", "Make It Out This Town", "Eve"
May 21	French Montana	Excuse My French	Coke Boys, Bad Boy Records, Maybach Music Group, Interscope Records	Debuted at No. 4 on the Billboard 200; Singles: "Pop That", "Freaks", "Ain't Worried About Nothin'
May 21	P-Money	Gratitude	Dirty Records, Dawn Raid Ent., Duck Down Music Inc.	
May 21	EDIDON	O.G. Est. 1992	O4L Digital	Singles: "No Lights On"
May 21	Gucci Mane	Trap House III	1017 Brick Squad, 101 Distribution	Debuted at No. 175 on the Billboard 200
May 23	Noah23	Lotus Deities	Plague Language	
May 27	Kool Keith & Big Sche Eastwood	Magnetic Pimp Force Field	Junkadelic Music	
May 27	Akala	The Thieves Banquet	lla State Records	
May 28	Aceyalone	Leanin' on Slick	Decon	
May 28	Kid Ink	Almost Home	Tha Alumni Music Group, RCA Records	Debuted at No. 27 on the Billboard 200; Singles: "Bad Ass"
June 11	Action Bronson	Saaab Stories	Vice Records, Atlantic Records	Debuted at No. 63 on the Billboard 200; Singles: "Strictly 4 My Jeeps"
June 11	Jarren Benton	My Grandma's Basement	Funk Volume	Debuted at No. 4 on the Billboard Heatseekers Albums; Singles: "Go Off"
June 11	Prodigy & The Alchemist	Albert Einstein	Infamous Records	Debuted at No. 175 on the Billboard 200
June 11	Young Fathers	Tape Two	Anticon	
June 18	Daz Dillinger & WC	West Coast Gangsta Shit	DPG Online, Dub C Online, Empire Distribution	Singles: "Wha'cha Gon Do"
June 18	Gregory Pepper & Madadam	Big Huge Truck	Fake Four Inc.	
June 18	J. Cole	Born Sinner	Roc Nation, Columbia Records	Debuted at No. 2 on the Billboard 200, peaked at No. 1; Singles: "Power Trip", "Crooked Smile"; Certified Gold by the RIAA.
June 18	Kanye West	Yeezus	Def Jam Recordings	Debuted at No. 1 on the Billboard 200; Singles: "Black Skinhead", "Bound 2"; Certified Platinum by the RIAA.
June 18	Mac Miller	Watching Movies with the Sound Off	Rostrum Records	Debuted at No. 3 on the Billboard 200; Singles: "S.D.S.", "Watching Movies", "Goosebumpz"
June 18	Quasimoto	Yessir Whatever	Stones Throw Records	
June 18	Statik Selektah	Extended Play	Showoff Records, Duck Down Music Inc.	Debuted at No. 121 on the Billboard 200; Singles: "Bird's Eye View", "21 & Over"
June 20	Freddie Gibbs	ESGN	ESGN, Empire Distribution	Debuted at No. 8 on the Billboard Heatseekers Albums; Singles: "One Eighty Seven"
June 23	Factor Chandelier	Woke Up Alone	Fake Four Inc.	
June 25	Dessa	Parts of Speech	Doomtree Records	Debuted at No. 74 on the Billboard 200
June 25	Serengeti	Kenny Dennis LP	Anticon	
June 25	Slum Village	Evolution	Ne'Astra Music	
June 25	Wale	The Gifted	Maybach Music Group, Atlantic Records	Debuted at No. 1 on the Billboard 200; Singles: "Bad", "LoveHate Thing"
June 25	Wrekonize	The War Within	Strange Music	Debuted at No. 88 on the Billboard 200; Singles: "Anxiety Attacks", "Freak", "We Got Soul", "Neon Skies"
June 26	Run the Jewels	Run the Jewels	Fool's Gold Records	
July 2	Billy Woods	Dour Candy	Backwoodz Studioz	
July 2	Jon Connor	Unconscious State	All Varsity Music	
July 4	Jay-Z	Magna Carta... Holy Grail	Roc-A-Fella Records, Roc Nation, Universal	Debuted at No. 1 on the Billboard 200; Singles: "Holy Grail", "Tom Ford"; Certified Platinum by the RIAA.
July 7	Open Mike Eagle	Sir Rockabye	Open Mike Eagle	
July 9	Greenhouse (Blueprint & Illogic)	Bend But Don't Break	OCF Music	
July 9	Kurupt	Kurupt Confidential	OCF Music	
July 9	Tony Touch	The Piece Maker 3: Return of the 50 MC's	Touch Entertainment, Inc., Red River Entertainment	
July 10	Jesse Jagz	Jagz Nation, Vol.1. Thy Nation Come	Jagz Nation	Singles: "Redemption", "Bad Girl"
July 13	Ka	The Night's Gambit	Iron Works	
July 16	Ace Hood	Trials & Tribulations	We the Best Music Group, Cash Money Records, Republic Records	Debuted at No. 4 on the Billboard 200; Singles: "Bugatti", "We Outchea"
July 16	Kevin Gates	Stranger Than Fiction	Atlantic Records	Debuted at No. 37 on the Billboard 200; Singles: "4:30"
July 16	¡Mayday!	Believers	Strange Music	
July 16	Hieroglyphics	The Kitchen	Hieroglyphics Imperium Recordings	
July 16	Lil Wyte & Jelly Roll	No Filter	Phixieous Entertainment	
July 23	Rich Gang	Rich Gang	Young Money Entertainment, Cash Money Records, Republic Records	Debuted at No. 9 on the Billboard 200; Singles: "Tapout", "We Been On", "50 Plates"
July 23	U-God	The Keynote Speaker	Soul Temple Records	Debuted at No. 58 on the Billboard R&B/Hip-Hop Albums.
July 23	Chamillionaire	Reignfall	Chamillitary Entertainment	Debuted at No. 40 on the Billboard R&B/Hip-Hop Albums.
July 30	Crooked I	Apex Predator	Treacherous C.O.B., Empire Distribution	Debuted at No. 33 on the Billboard R&B/Hip-Hop Albums.
July 30	Tech N9ne	Something Else	Strange Music	Debuted at No. 4 on the Billboard 200.; Singles: "So Dope (They Wanna)"
August 6	Homeboy Sandman	All That I Hold Dear	Stones Throw	
August 6	Madchild	Lawn Mower Man	Battle Axe, Suburban Noize Records	Debuted at No. 149 on the Billboard 200
August 12	Sifu Hotman	Sifu Hotman	Stashin Records	
August 13	Stevie Stone	2 Birds 1 Stone	Strange Music	Debuted at No. 76 on the Billboard 200
August 13	Terrace Martin	3ChordFold	AKAI Music	
August 18	No Malice	Hear Ye Him	Reinvision	
August 18	Bones	SCUMBAG	TeamSESH	
August 20	ASAP Ferg	Trap Lord	ASAP Worldwide, Polo Grounds Music, RCA Records	Debuted at No. 9 on the Billboard 200; Singles: "Work (Remix)", "Shabba", "Hood Pope"
August 20	Earl Sweatshirt	Doris	Tan Cressida, Columbia Records	Debuted at No. 5 on the Billboard 200; Singles: "Chum", "Whoa", "Hive"
August 20	Jel	Late Pass	Anticon	
August 20	Noah23	Occult Trill III: Blast Master Therion	Plague Language	
August 27	Almighty	2nd Coming	RBC Records	
August 27	Big Sean	Hall of Fame	GOOD Music, Def Jam Recordings	Debuted at No. 3 on the Billboard 200; Singles: "Guap", "Switch Up", "Beware", "Fire"
August 27	Goodie Mob	Age Against the Machine	The Right Records	Debuted at No. 30 on the Billboard 200; Singles: "Special Education"
August 27	Juicy J	Stay Trippy	Kemosabe Records, Columbia Records	Debuted at No. 4 on the Billboard 200; Singles: "Bandz a Make Her Dance", "Show Out", "Bounce It", "Talkin' Bout"
August 27	Krizz Kaliko	Son of Sam	Strange Music	Debuted at No. 56 on the Billboard 200
August 27	Rapzilla	King Kulture: Stop the Traffic	Rapzilla	
August 30	Wordburglar	Welcome to Cobra Island	Props Dept.	
September 5	Brother Ali	Left in the Deck	Rhymesayers Entertainment	
September 10	2 Chainz	B.O.A.T.S. II: Me Time	Def Jam Recordings	Debuted at No. 3 on the Billboard 200; Singles: "Feds Watching", "Used 2"
September 10	Derek Minor	Minorville	Reach Records, RMG	
September 10	Young Chop	Precious	8 Tray Music Group	
September 17	Grayskul	Zenith	Fake Four Inc.	
September 17	Maybach Music Group	Self Made Vol. 3	Maybach Music Group, Atlantic Records	Debuted at No. 4 on the Billboard 200; Singles: "Poor Decisions", "Levels", "God Is Great", "Know You Better"
September 17	Prozak	We All Fall Down	Strange Music	
September 17	Whitenoise (Sole)	No More Dystopias	Black Canyon	Instrumental project; Released under the moniker Whitenoise
September 17	Stalley	Honest Cowboy	Maybach Music Group, Atlantic Records	
September 24	Drake	Nothing Was the Same	OVO Sound, Young Money Entertainment, Cash Money Records, Republic Records	Debuted at No. 1 on the Billboard 200; Singles: "Started from the Bottom", "Hold On, We're Going Home", "All Me", "Pound Cake", "The Language", "Too Much"; Certified Platinum by the RIAA.
September 24	Guilty Simpson & Small Professor	Highway Robbery	Beat Goliath, Coalmine Records	
September 24	Natti	Still Motion	APOS Music	
September 30	Dizzee Rascal	The Fifth	Dirtee Stank, Universal Music Group	Singles: "Goin' Crazy", "Something Really Bad"
September 30	Nelly	M.O.	Republic Records	Debuted at No. 14 on the Billboard 200; Singles: "Hey Porsche", "Get Like Me", "Heaven"
September 30	Deltron 3030	Event 2	Deltron Partners, Bulk Recordings	Debuted at No. 41 on the Billboard 200
October 1	Blue Sky Black Death	Glaciers	Fake Four Inc.	
October 1	Oddisee	The Beauty in All	Mello Music Group	
October 8	Danny Brown	Old	Fool's Gold Records	Debuted at No. 17 on the Billboard 200
October 8	Pusha T	My Name Is My Name	GOOD Music, Def Jam Recordings	Debuted at No. 4 on the Billboard 200; Singles: "Pain", "Numbers on the Boards", "Sweet Serenade"
October 8	Termanology	Goya	Brick Records	
October 11	MJG	Too Pimpin	Space Age Entertainment, Born Star Entertainment	
October 15	Shad	Flying Colours	Black Box Recordings Inc.	
October 15	Black Milk	No Poison No Paradise	Fat Beats Records	Singles: "Sunday's Best/Monday's Worst"
October 15	Boldy James	My 1st Chemistry Set	Decon	Singles: "Moochie", "Reform School"
October 15	Bubba Sparxxx	Pain Management	BackRoad Records, Average Joes Entertainment	
October 15	Cashis	The County Hound 2	Bogish Brand Ent.	Singles: "Layin' in the Cut", "Mind On Money", "Imma Hustla", "Look At Me", "Hi"
October 15	Devin the Dude	One for the Road	Coughee Brothaz Music, E1 Music	Singles: "Probably Should Have"
October 15	Dom Kennedy	Get Home Safely	The Other Peoples Money Company	Debuted at No. 29 on the Billboard 200
October 15	Young Dro	High Times	Grand Hustle Records, E1 Music, Atlantic Records	Debuted at No. 57 on the Billboard 200; Singles: "FDB", "Strong"
October 22	Armand Hammer (Billy Woods & Elucid)	Race Music	Backwoodz Studioz	
October 22	Blu & Nottz	Gods in the Spirit	Coalmine Records	
October 22	Cage	Kill the Architect	Eastern Conference Records, KGMG	
October 22	David Dallas	Falling into Place	Outlier, Dawn Raid Entertainment, Dirty Records, Duck Down Music Inc.	
October 22	DJ Khaled	Suffering from Success	We the Best Music Group, Cash Money Records, Republic Records	Debuted at No. 7 on the Billboard 200; Singles: "No New Friends", "I Wanna Be with You"
October 25	Kerser	S.C.O.T.	Kerser N Nebs Records	Debuted at No. 5 on the ARIA Albums Chart; Singles: "Scott vs Kers"
October 28	Ice Prince	Fire of Zamani	Chocolate City	Singles: "Aboki", "More", "Gimme Dat", "I Swear"
October 29	Beautiful Eulogy	Instruments of Mercy	Humble Beast	Singles: "Vital Lens"
October 29	Joey Badass	Summer Knights EP	Cinematic Music Group, Pro Era Records, RED Distribution	
October 29	Josh Martinez	Blotto	Camobear Music	
October 29	Vinnie Paz	Carry on Tradition	Pazmanian Devil Music	
October 29	Yancey Boys	Sunset Blvd.	Delicious Vinyl, Yancey Media Group	
October 31	Blaq Poet	Blaq Death	Man Bites Dog Records	
October 31	Fredo Santana	Trappin Ain't Dead	Savage Squad Records	
October 31	MellowHigh	MellowHigh	Odd Future Records	Debuted at No. 89 on the Billboard 200; Singles: "Yu"
October 31	Ra Scion	The Sickle and the Sword	SCIONtific Records	
October 31	Swamp Thing (Chokeules, Savillion & Timbuktu)	Firedogs	URBNET	
November 4	Shady Blaze	Green Ova's Most Hated	Green Ova	
November 4	Tinie Tempah	Demonstration	Parlophone, Disturbing London	Singles: "Trampoline", "Children of the Sun"
November 4	Troy Ave	New York City: The Album	BSB Records	
November 5	Eminem	The Marshall Mathers LP 2	Aftermath Entertainment, Shady Records, Interscope Records	Debuted at No. 1 on the Billboard 200; Singles: "Berzerk", "Survival", "Rap God", "The Monster", "Headlights"; Certified Double Platinum by the RIAA
November 5	Ghettosocks	For You Pretty Things	Droppin' Science Productions	
November 5	Latyrx	The Second Album	Latyramid, Inc	
November 5	Sole	Crimes Against Totality	Black Canyon	
November 5	Tech N9ne	Therapy	Strange Music	
November 11	Bun B	Trill OG: The Epilogue	Rap-A-Lot Records	Debuted at No. 30 on the Billboard 200; Singles: "Fire"
November 12	Built to Fade	To Dust	APOS Music	
November 12	Chris Webby	Homegrown	Homegrown, E1 Music	
November 12	Eddie B. & Harry Fraud	Paper, Piff & Polo	Man Bites Dog Records	
November 12	Louis Logic	Look on the Blight Side	Fake Four Inc.	
November 12	Marco Polo	PA2: The Director's Cut	Soulspazm, Inc.	Singles: "3-O-Clock"
November 12	No Bird Sing	Definition Sickness	Strange Famous Records	
November 19	The Godfathers	Once Upon a Crime	Psycho+Logical-Records, RBC Records	
November 19	Slim Thug	Boss Life	Hogg Life	
November 19	Sammy Adams	Homecoming	RCA Records	
November 19	Webbie	Savage Life 4	Trill Entertainment	Singles: "What I Do", "Bad Bitch 2"
November 19	Yo Gotti	I Am	CMG, Epic	Debuted at No. 8 on the Billboard 200; Singles: "Act Right", "King Shit", "Cold Blood"
November 19	Yonas	The Transition Deluxe	YONAS, LLC	
November 24	Hopsin	Knock Madness	Funk Volume, Empire Distribution	Peaked at No. 78 on the Billboard 200; Singles: "Old Friend", "Hop Is Back", "Rip Your Heart Out"
November 25	Pitbull	Meltdown	Mr. 305, Polo Grounds, RCA Records	Debuted at No. 95 on the Billboard 200; Singles: "Timber"
November 26	Chinx	I'll Take It from Here	NuSense Music Group, Coke Boys	
November 26	Esoteric & Stu Bangas	Machete Mode	Man Bites Dog Records	
November 26	Rich Homie Quan	I Promise I Will Never Stop Going In		debuted at No. 110 on the Billboard 200
November 29	Sido	30–11–80	Vertigo, Capitol Records	
December 3	Smif-n-Wessun	Born and Raised	Duck Down Music Inc.	Singles: "Solid Ground"
December 3	Jim Jones	We Own the Night	Vampire Life	Singles: "Nasty Girl"
December 6	Master P	The Gift	NLF Digital Media	Singles: "Two Three"
December 10	Childish Gambino	Because the Internet	Glassnote Records, Island Records	debuted at No. 7 on the Billboard 200; Singles: "3005"
December 10	Dice Raw	Jimmy's Back	Rawlife, Soul Spazm	
December 10	E-40	The Block Brochure: Welcome to the Soil 4	Heavy on the Grind Entertainment	Debuted at No. 136 on the Billboard 200; Singles: "Episode"
December 10	E-40	The Block Brochure: Welcome to the Soil 5	Heavy on the Grind Entertainment	Debuted at No. 140 on the Billboard 200; Singles: "All My Niggaz"
December 10	E-40	The Block Brochure: Welcome to the Soil 6	Heavy on the Grind Entertainment	Debuted at No. 151 on the Billboard 200
December 10	Paul Wall	#Checkseason	Paul Wall Music	
December 10	Problem	Understand Me	Diamond Lane Music Group	Singles: "Like Whaaat", "Say That Then"
December 10	Roc Marciano	Marci Beaucoup	Man Bites Dog Records	
December 10	Snoopzilla & Dâm-Funk	7 Days of Funk	Stones Throw Records	Singles: "Faden Away"
December 10	Tonedeff	Demon	QN5 Music	
December 10	Twista	Back to the Basics	GMG Entertainment	
December 11	Doseone	The Samurai Gunn EP	Doseone	
December 11	Serengeti	C.A.B.	Anticon	
December 13	Snowgoons	Black Snow 2	Goon MuSick	
December 15	Talib Kweli	Gravitas	Javotti Media	
December 17	B.o.B	Underground Luxury	Rebel Rock, Grand Hustle Records, Atlantic Records	Debuted at No. 22 on the Billboard 200; Singles: "We Still in This Bitch", "HeadBand", "Ready", "All I Want", "John Doe"
December 17	Mac Miller	Live from Space	Rostrum Records	
December 17	Sean Price & M-Phazes	Land of the Crooks	Coalmine Records	
December 18	The Lox	The Trinity	D-Block Records	Debuted at No. 141 on the Billboard 200
December 19	D-Sisive & Tone Mason	Raging Bull	The Desolate Collective	
December 25	The Alchemist	The Cutting Room Floor 3	ALC	
December 25	Gucci Mane	The State vs. Radric Davis II: The Caged Bird Sings	1017 Brick Squad, 101 Distribution	
December 25	Wolves (Bix, D-Sisive, Ghettosocks, Muneshine & Timbuktu)	Wolves	Droppin' Science Productions	
December 30	Angel Haze	Dirty Gold	Island Records, Republic Records	Singles: "Echelon (It's My Way)"

== Highest-charting songs ==
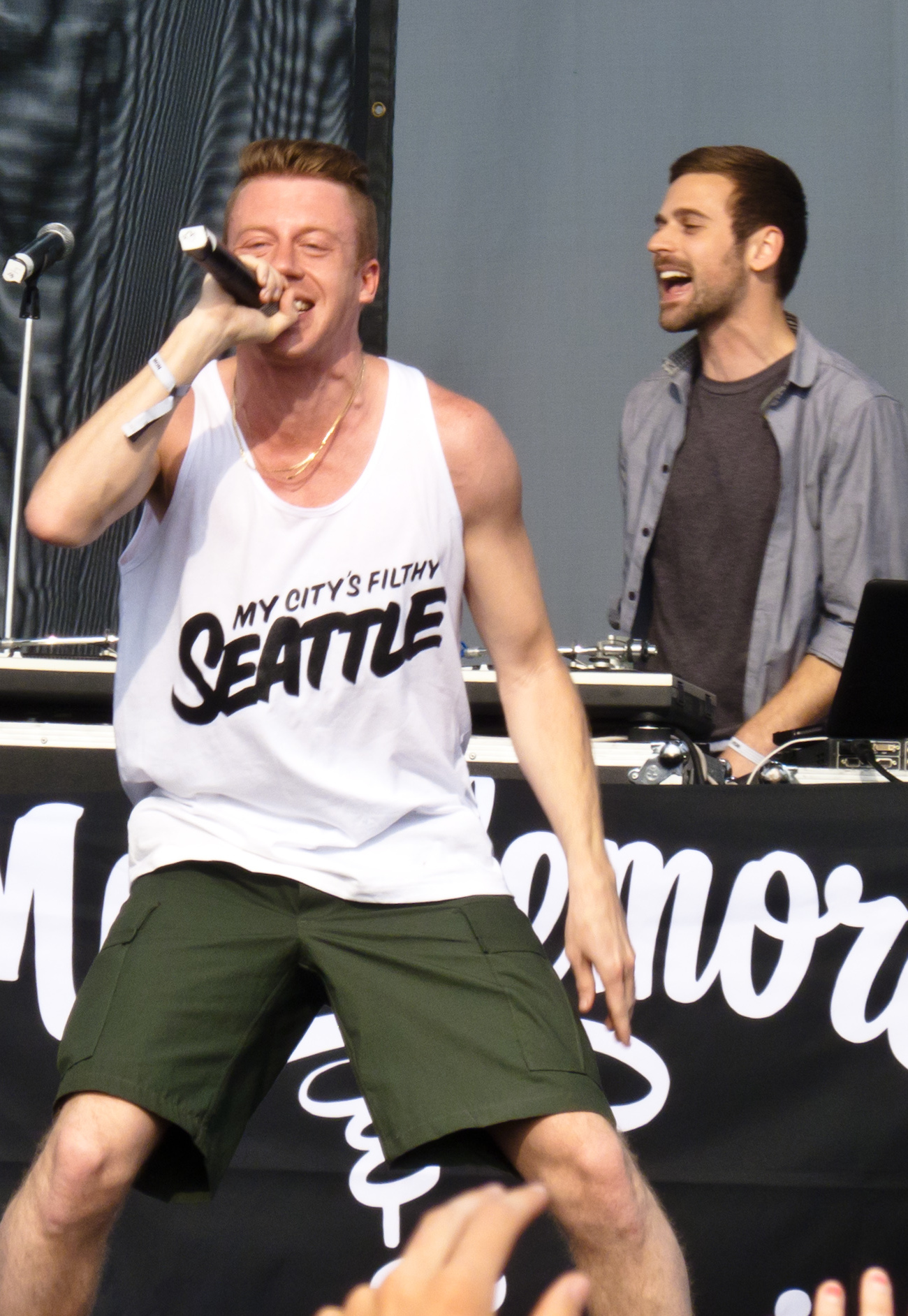
Macklemore & Ryan Lewis released the hit singles "Thrift Shop", "Can't Hold Us", "Same Love" and "White Walls" during 2013.

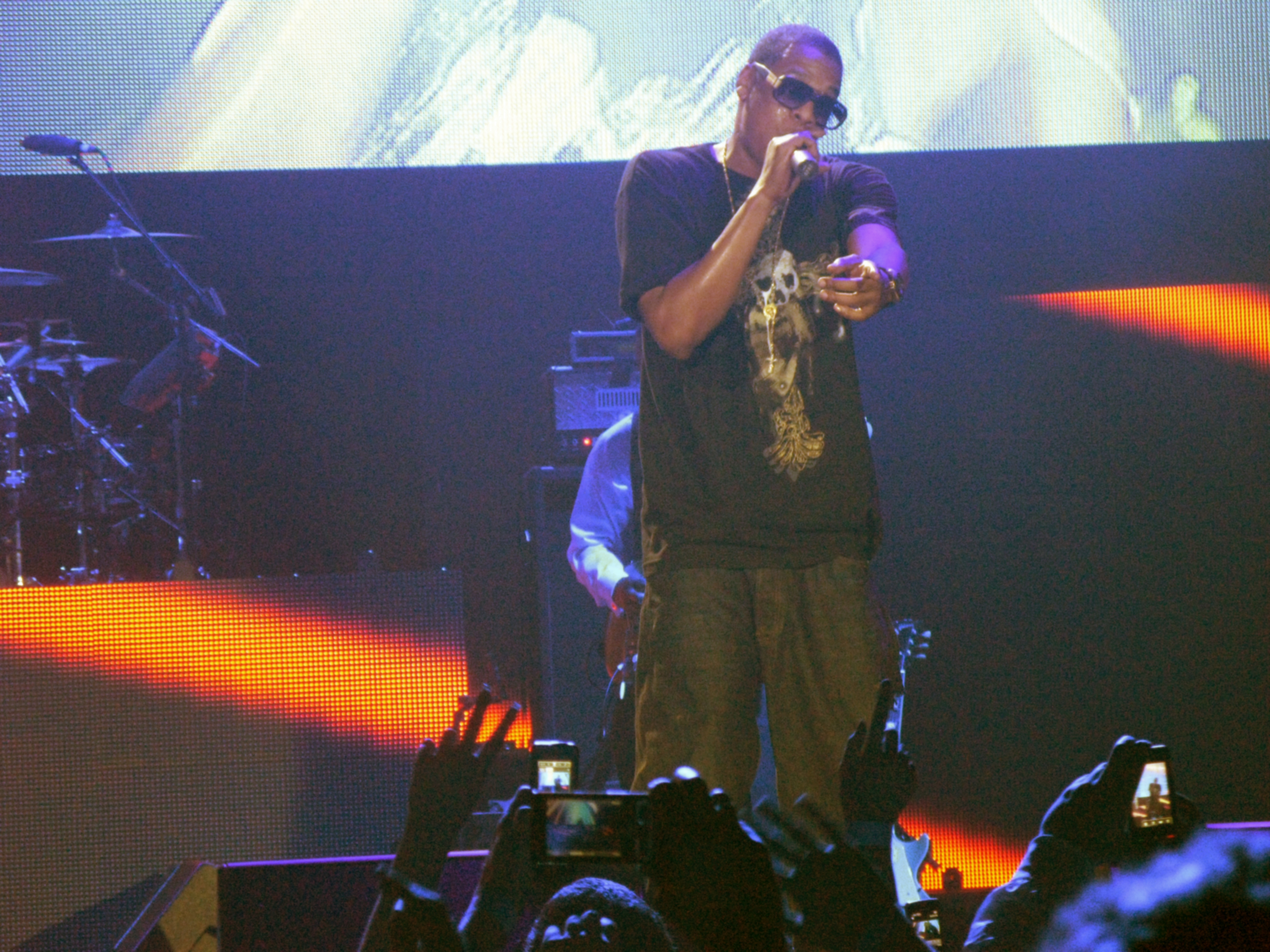
Jay-Z released the hit singles "Holy Grail" and "Tom Ford" during 2013.

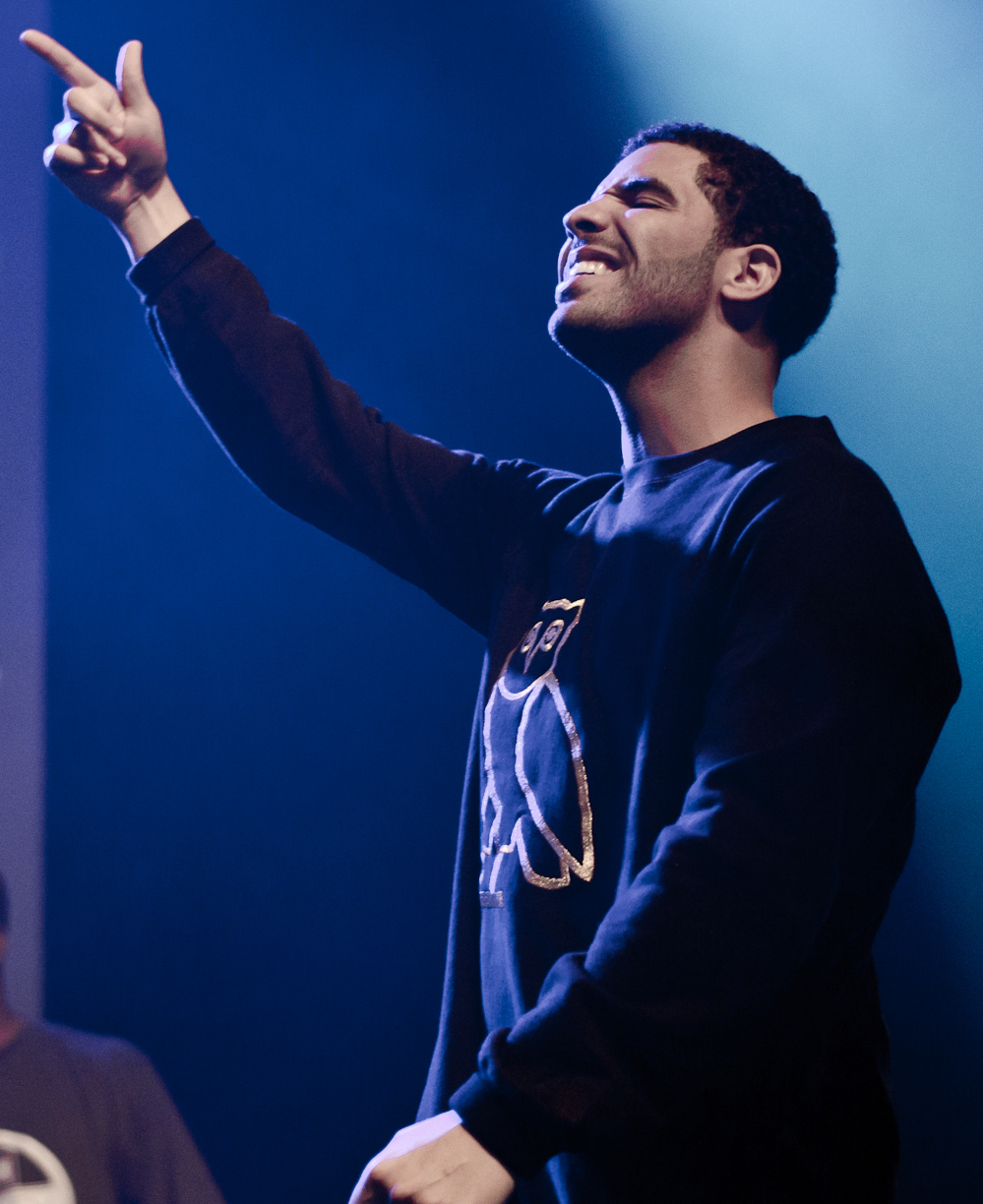
During 2013, Drake released the hit singles "Started from the Bottom" and "All Me", along with being featured on "Fuckin' Problems", "Love Me", "Poetic Justice" and "No New Friends".

Hip hop singles which peaked in the Top 40 of the Billboard Hot 100
Title	Artist	Peak position
"Thrift Shop"	Macklemore & Ryan Lewis featuring Wanz	1
"Can't Hold Us"	Macklemore & Ryan Lewis featuring Ray Dalton	1
"The Monster"	Eminem featuring Rihanna	1
"Berzerk"	Eminem	3
"Holy Grail"	Jay-Z featuring Justin Timberlake	4
"Started from the Bottom"	Drake	6
"Rap God"	Eminem	7
"Fuckin' Problems"	ASAP Rocky featuring Drake, 2 Chainz and Kendrick Lamar	8
"Love Me"	Lil Wayne featuring Drake and Future	9
"Same Love"	Macklemore & Ryan Lewis featuring Mary Lambert	11
"23"	Mike WiLL Made-It featuring Miley Cyrus, Wiz Khalifa & Juicy J	11
"Bound 2"	Kanye West	12
"White Walls"	Macklemore & Ryan Lewis featuring ScHoolboy Q & Hollis	15
"We Own It (Fast & Furious)"	2 Chainz & Wiz Khalifa	16
"Survival"	Eminem	16
"#thatPower"	will.i.am featuring Justin Bieber	17
"Gone"	Kanye West featuring Cam'ron and Consequence	18
"Power Trip"	J. Cole featuring Miguel	19
"My Nigga"	YG featuring Young Jeezy and Rich Homie Quan	19
"U.O.E.N.O."	Rocko featuring Future and Rick Ross	20
"All Me"	Drake featuring 2 Chainz and Big Sean	20
"Bad"	Wale featuring Tiara Thomas	21
"Poetic Justice"	Kendrick Lamar featuring Drake	26
"I'm Different"	2 Chainz	27
"Crooked Smile"	J. Cole featuring TLC	27
"Gas Pedal"	Sage the Gemini featuring Iamsu!	29
"Show Me"	Kid Ink featuring Chris Brown	29
"No Worries"	Lil Wayne featuring Detail	29
"Bitch, Don't Kill My Vibe"	Kendrick Lamar	32
"Bugatti"	Ace Hood featuring Future and Rick Ross	33
"Don't Drop That Thun Thun!"	FiNaTTicZ	35
"All Gold Everything"	Trinidad James	36
"No New Friends"	DJ Khaled featuring Drake, Rick Ross and Lil Wayne	37
"Rich As Fuck"	Lil Wayne featuring 2 Chainz	38
"Beware"	Big Sean featuring Lil Wayne and Jhené Aiko	38
"Tom Ford"	Jay-Z	39

== Highest first-week sales ==
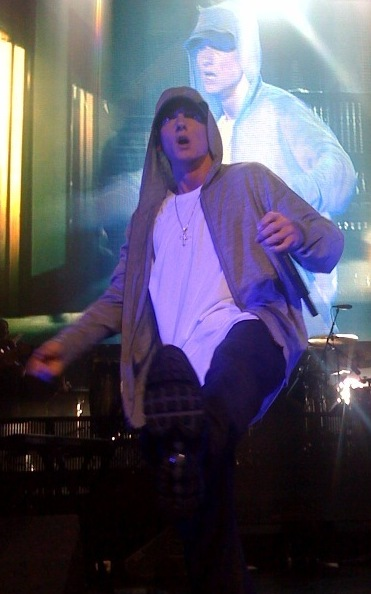
Eminem's eighth studio album The Marshall Mathers LP 2 sold 793,000 copies in the United States during its first week of release.

List of top ten albums released in 2013 according to first-week home market sales, as of November 13, 2013
Number	Album	Artist	1st-week sales	1st-week position	Refs
1	The Marshall Mathers LP 2	Eminem	793,000	1	
2	Nothing Was the Same	Drake	658,000	1	
3	Magna Carta Holy Grail	Jay-Z	527,000	1	
4	Yeezus	Kanye West	328,000	1	
5	Born Sinner	J. Cole	298,000	2	
6	I Am Not a Human Being II	Lil Wayne	217,000	2	
7	The Gifted	Wale	158,000	1	
8	Long. Live. ASAP	ASAP Rocky	139,000	1	
9	Indicud	Kid Cudi	139,000	2	
10	Watching Movies with the Sound Off	Mac Miller	102,000	3	

== Highest critically reviewed albums ==
=== Metacritic ===
Number	Artist	Album	Average score	Number of reviews	Reference
1	Run the Jewels	Run the Jewels	86	25 reviews	
2	Chance the Rapper	Acid Rap	86	21 reviews	
3	Kanye West	Yeezus	84	46 reviews	
4	Danny Brown	Old	83	30 reviews	
5	Earl Sweatshirt	Doris	82	32 reviews	
6	Pusha T	My Name Is My Name	81	27 reviews	
7	Drake	Nothing Was the Same	79	33 reviews	
8	Ghostface Killah	Twelve Reasons to Die	78	27 reviews	
9	Czarface	Czarface	77	7 reviews	
10	ASAP Rocky	Long. Live. ASAP	75	40 reviews	

=== AnyDecentMusic? ===
Number	Artist	Album	Average score	Number of reviews	Reference
1	Danny Brown	Old	8.3	22 reviews	
2	Kanye West	Yeezus	8.2	38 reviews	
3	Chance the Rapper	Acid Rap	8.1	11 reviews	
4	Earl Sweatshirt	Doris	8.0	22 reviews	
5	Ka	The Night's Gambit	7.9	6 reviews	

== See also ==
- Previous article: 2012 in hip-hop
- Next article: 2014 in hip-hop
