= Sap production discography =

The following is a discography of production by hip hop recording artist and record producer SAP.

== Singles produced ==
List of singles as producer showing year released, performing artists and album name
Title	Year	Album
"Donald Trump" (Mac Miller)	2011	Best Day Ever
"Celebration" (The Game featuring Chris Brown, Tyga, Wiz Khalifa, and Lil Wayne)	2012	Jesus Piece
"Watching Movies" (Mac Miller)	2013	Watching Movies with the Sound Off
"One Eighty Seven" (Freddie Gibbs featuring Problem)	2013	Evil Seeds Grow Naturally
"Talkin' About" (Juicy J featuring Chris Brown and Wiz Khalifa)	2014	Stay Trippy
"STRICTLY4MYNIGGAZ" (Domo Genesis)	2014	Under the Influence 2
"Master $uite" (Tyga)	2015	Fuk Wat They Talkin Bout
"Don't C Me Comin" (Tyga featuring A.E.)	2015	Fuk Wat They Talkin Bout

== 2008 ==
=== Meek Mill - Flamers ===
- 05. "In My Bag"

== 2011 ==
=== Mac Miller - Best Day Ever ===
- 03. "Donald Trump"
- 07. "Wake Up"

== 2012 ==
=== Don Trip - Guerrilla ===
- 04. "Trap'd In The Trap"

=== Mac Miller - Macadelic ===
- 04. "Thoughts from a Balcony"

=== The Game - California Republic ===
- 05. "Mean Muggin'" (featuring 2 Chainz and French Montana)

=== Meek Mill - Dreamchasers 2 ===
- 18. "Real"

=== Don Trip - Help Is On the Way ===
- 14. "Watch Me"

=== The Game - Sunday Service ===
- 01. "Celebration (Remix)" (featuring Bone Thugs-n-Harmony) [produced with Cool & Dre]
- 02. "Holy Water"
- 04. "Black Jesus"

=== Chris Webby - Bars On Me ===
- 07. "Dark Side" (featuring Emilio Rajas)

=== Freeway - Freedom of Speech ===
- 11. "Ghetto Love" (featuring Free)

=== The Game - Jesus Piece ===
- 08. "Name Me King" (featuring Pusha T)
- 13. "Celebration" (featuring Chris Brown, Tyga, Wiz Khalifa, and Lil Wayne) [produced with Cool & Dre]
- 17. "Holy Water"

== 2013 ==
=== Tyga - Hotel California ===
- 04. "Diss Song" (produced with Cool & Dre and Jess Jackson)
- 13. "Enemies"

=== Lil Dicky - So Hard ===
- 08. "Attached at the Hip"
- 14. "Too High"

=== XXL - XXL 2013's Freshmen Class: The Mixtape ===
- 04. "She Like" (performed by ScHoolboy Q)

=== Mac Miller - Watching Movies with the Sound Off ===
- 11. "Watching Movies" (produced with Larry Fisherman)

=== Freddie Gibbs - Evil Seeds Grow Naturally ===
- 09. "One Eighty Seven" (featuring Problem)

=== Fat Joe - The Darkside III ===
- 02. "Madison Squares" (produced with Cool & Dre)

=== Juicy J - Stay Trippy ===
- 12. "Talkin' Bout" (featuring Chris Brown and Wiz Khalifa) [produced with ID Labs and Ritz Reynolds]

=== The Game - OKE: Operation Kill Everything ===
- 04. "In the City" (featuring Fred the Godson and Sam Hook)
- 05. "F.I.V.E." (featuring Chris Brown and Lil Wayne) [produced with Cool & Dre]
- 13. "Compton" (featuring Stat Quo)
- 15. "Super Throwed" (featuring Juicy J)

=== Snow Tha Product - Good Nights & Bad Mornings 2: The Hangover ===
- 20. "Fuck the Rent"

=== Chevy Woods - Gang Land 2 ===
- 06. "Things Change"

=== Chris Webby - Homegrown ===
- 06. "Only Way To Go"

== 2014 ==
=== Wiz Khalifa - 28 Grams ===
- 19. "The Last"

=== Tyga - ===
- "Real Deal"

=== Phat J - Phat Wraps ===
- 04. "Roll It Up" (featuring Joe Killit Fonix FEEN)

=== Spitta Andretti - More Saturday Night Car Tunes ===
- 04. "Money Shot" (featuring Mac Miller)

=== Audio Push - ===
- "Fwd Back" (featuring Riff Raff and King Chip)

=== The Game - Blood Moon: Year of the Wolf ===
- 18. "I Just Wanna Be" (featuring Stat Quo, SAP, and King Marie)

=== Chris Webby - Chemically Imbalanced ===
- 02. "So Eazy"

=== Tyga - ===
- "Make It Work"

=== Domo Genesis - Under the Influence 2 ===
- 06. "Go Outside" (featuring Iamsu!)
- 13. "STRICTLY4MYNIGGAZ"

=== Nipsey Hussle - Mailbox Money ===
- 04. "That's How I Knew" (produced with Kitchen J)

== 2015 ==
=== Meek Mill - ===
- "B Boy" (featuring Big Sean and A$AP Ferg)

=== Hodgy Beats - ===
- "Layback"

=== Casey Veggies - ===
- "Anybody"

=== Tyga - The Gold Album: 18th Dynasty ===
- 03. "Shaka Zulu" (produced with Jess Jackson)
- 06. "Down for a Min" (produced with Jess Jackson and Mike Dean)

=== The Alumni - ===
- "Forbes" (featuring Kid Ink, Bricc Baby, Vee Tha Rula, and Shy Glizzy)

=== Tyga - Fuk Wat They Talkin Bout ===
- 03. "Master $uite" (produced with Soundz and Cool & Dre)
- 12. "Don't C Me Comin'" (featuring A.E.) [produced with Metro Boomin]

=== Chris Webby - Jamo Neat ===
- 01. "Walt and Jesse" (featuring SAP)
- 02. "Master of the Ceremony"
- 03. "Whatchu Need" (featuring SAP and Stacey Michelle)
- 04. "Feelin' Like"
- 05. "Screws Loose" (featuring Stacey Michelle)
- 06. "True Romance"
- 07. "Say It Ain't So" (featuring SAP)
- 08. "Jekyll and Hyde" (featuring Stacey Michelle)
- 09. "Vibe 2 It" (featuring SAP)
- 10. "That's Life"

=== Mac Miller - GO:OD AM ===
- 16. "Jump" (produced with Badboxes, DJ Dahi, and ID Labs)

== 2016 ==
=== Wiz Khalifa - Khalifa ===
- 04. "City View" (featuring Courtney Noelle)

=== Domo Genesis - Genesis ===
- 07. "Coming Back" (featuring Mac Miller)

=== The Game - Block Wars Soundtrack ===
- 04. "Alameda"
- 09. "Bullet with Your Name on It"
