= Nylo =

American singer

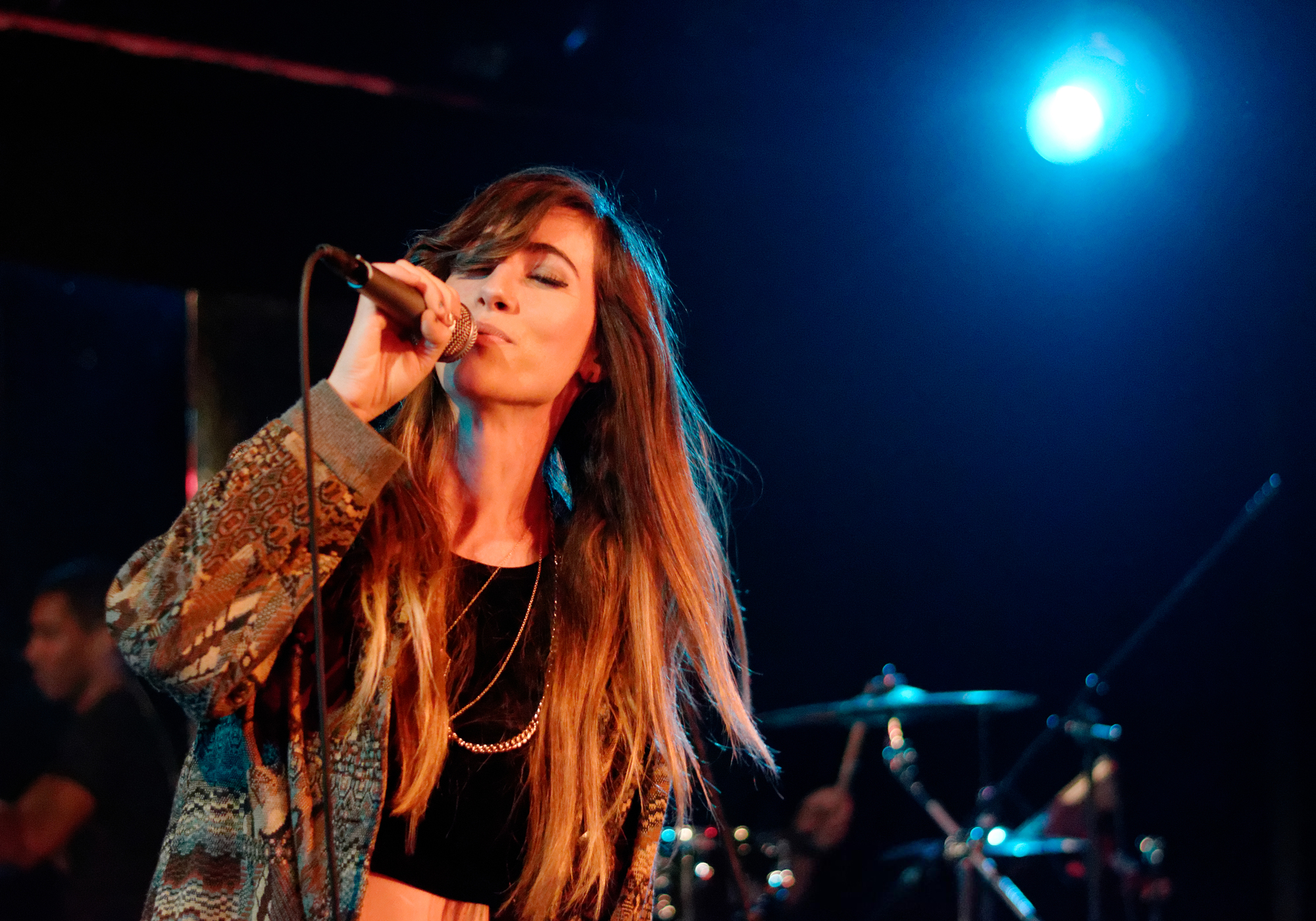
Nylo in 2013

Andrea Landis, commonly known by her stage name Nylo, is an American singer, songwriter, musician and record producer from Chicago, Illinois.

== Life and career ==
Landis was born and raised in Chicago. She began singing after being influenced by the singers at her Methodist church, and was also inspired by her father's liking of singers such as Whitney Houston, Stevie Nicks, and Madonna. She learned to play piano at church, and received her first piano at age of 16. When her parents divorced, Landis moved with her mother to Texas, and she dropped out of high school before her senior year. She began performing open mic shows, while also learning music production with the digital audio workstation Reason. She began shadowing at a studio after someone found her at an open mic show and wanted to record some of her material.

Through a friend, Landis found out about an available part of a play in Los Angeles. She won the part and performed in the play for 13 weeks. She then began writing for other artists, but decided to write songs for herself, stating: "That was the number one thing I found: All these people would come in and they had a great voice or something about them was special, but they had nothing to say. I was like 'I'm not doing this anymore. If I'm going to write these songs 100%, I might as well just release them. These people don't care what they're saying.'"

After turning down offers from studios and record labels, Landis began working on her debut extended play, Memories Speak, released in 2012. Landis signed to Epic Records two months after Memories Speak was released. Landis was then discovered by Chicago-based blog Fake Shore Drive, which in turn led Chicago producer J. Hill to sample the Memories Speak song "Someone Like You" in an instrumental; the instrumental was subsequently used for a Mac Miller song of the same name, and was featured on Miller's second studio album, Watching Movies with the Sound Off (2013). Memories Speak also received endorsement from rapper Nas. In mid-2013, Landis claimed to be working on her debut studio album.

On April 9, 2020, Landis released a music video of a new song, "A History of Sorry", consisting of footage taken during the COVID-19 quarantine. The song is included on her EP, A Brief History of Sorry, released on May 8, 2020.

== Discography ==
- Memories Speak (2012)
- Indigo Summer (2013)
- A Brief History of Sorry (2020)
