= Live from Space =

Live album by Mac Miller
- Released: December 17, 2013
- Recorded: 2013
- Genre: Hip-hop
- Length: 61:42
- Label: Rostrum
- Producer: The Internet; ID Labs; Teddy Roxpin; Thundercat

Mac Miller chronology
Delusional Thomas (2013)	Live from Space (2013)	Faces (2014)

Live from Space is the only live album by American rapper Mac Miller. The album was released on December 17, 2013, by Rostrum Records. The album was recorded on The Space Migration Tour which ran from June 25, 2013, until July 18, 2013. The album also features five previously unreleased songs that didn't make his second studio album Watching Movies with the Sound Off.

== Critical reception ==
Professional ratings
Review scores
Source	Rating
Exclaim!	6/10
HipHopDX	3.5/5 stars

Upon its release, Live from Space received generally positive reviews from music critics. Marcus J. Moore of HipHopDX gave the album three and a half stars out of five, saying "Ultimately, this album faces the same shortcoming as most live recordings: that you can’t truly appreciate the music until you’ve seen it performed. There’s no way to see the fans’ faces or feel their adulation when their favorite songs drop. You can't feel the stadium rattle or watch the band actively simulate Miller's catalog. Live from Space isn't that visual, so the live tracks quickly lose steam after a few listens. It shouldn't dissipate Miller's momentum this year. If anything, it puts a nice ribbon atop the rapper's valiant comeback." Chayne Japal of Exclaim! gave the album a six out of ten, saying "The pride and effort Mac and Syd's boys brought to the stage should be commended, but for the most part, the songs included on this album, as recordings, didn't need or receive any improvements, nor are they old enough to need updating. The glowing exception is the touching rendition of "Youforia" that swaps the douche-esque Mike Posner vibe of the original for a stripped-down, vulnerable performance that is another example of Mac's versatility."

== Track listing ==
No.	Title	Producer(s)	Length
1.	"S.D.S." (Live)	The Internet	3:30
2.	"The Star Room / Killin' Time" (Live)	The Internet	5:33
3.	"BDE (Best Day Ever)" (Live)	The Internet	5:21
4.	"Bird Call" (Live)	The Internet	2:41
5.	"Watching Movies" (Live)	The Internet	3:33
6.	"REMember" (Live)	The Internet	4:31
7.	"The Question" (Live)	The Internet	8:11
8.	"Objects in the Mirror" (Live)	The Internet	6:29
9.	"Youforia" (Live)	The Internet	4:06
10.	"Eggs Aisle"	ID Labs	2:40
11.	"Earth" (featuring Future)	ID Labs; Teddy Roxpin	4:16
12.	"Life"	Larry Fisherman	3:15
13.	"Black Bush"	Larry Fisherman	3:10
14.	"In the Morning" (featuring Syd tha Kyd & Thundercat)	Thundercat; The Internet	4:25
Total length:			61:42

== Charts ==
Chart (2013)	Peak position
US Top R&B/Hip-Hop Albums (Billboard)	23
US Independent Albums (Billboard)	33
