= Sap (producer) =

American record producer from Delaware

SAP
- Also known as: SAP da Beat Man
- Born: Jonathan King; February 6, 1990 (age 36); Chester, Pennsylvania, U.S.
- Origin: Newark, Delaware, U.S.
- Genre: Hip hop
- Occupations: Record producer; songwriter; rapper
- Instruments: FL Studio; vocals
- Years active: 2008–present
- Labels: Pioneer Crew; Epidemic

Jonathan King (born February 6, 1990), better known by his stage name Sap (stylized as SAP; acronym for Sound of a Pioneer) is an American record producer and rapper from Newark, Delaware. He has produced for artists such as Mac Miller, the Game, Schoolboy Q, Tyga, Chris Webby, Juicy J, Juelz Santana, Fat Joe, Freddie Gibbs, and Meek Mill, among others. He is best known for producing Mac Miller's 2011 single "Donald Trump".

== Musical career ==
Sap was born in Chester, Pennsylvania, but moved to Newark, Delaware at a very young age. Sap first begun making hip hop instrumentals on FL Studio at the age of 15, putting his beats on MySpace. He went to Christiana High School in Newark. Around 2007 to 2008, he began producing for local rappers such as Joey Jihad and Reed Dollaz. Then in 2008 he received what he considers his first big beat placement, producing "In My Bag" by Philadelphia rapper Meek Mill. Around the same time he also produced Cyssero's "In the Air" and "Swag Me Out", which were in local club rotation. By January 2009, he confirmed working with rappers such as Juelz Santana, Freeway, Gillie Da Kid, Lloyd Banks and Beanie Sigel. After two more years he had worked with Cassidy and Jadakiss among many others.

After producing Mac Miller's hit single "Donald Trump", he linked up with known producers Cool & Dre in early 2011 through DJ Young Legend. Then in July 2011, Complex named Sap one of the "15 New Producers To Watch Out For". On February 12, 2012, he announced that he had signed to producers Cool & Dre, Epidemic Records label as a producer and artist, along with Cash Money Records as a producer. Following that he worked with more high-profile artists such as Rick Ross, Game, Wiz Khalifa, Busta Rhymes, Nicki Minaj, Birdman on their upcoming albums. Following that announcement, five days later he released his first mixtape as a rapper, Surprise, Surprise, which was primarily produced by himself, on February 17, 2012. Following its release he announced that he wanted to release another mixtape titled The Invite featuring him as a rapper, with production coming from other producers such as Cool & Dre, Jahlil Beats, The Beat Bully and himself.

On October 16, 2012, Sap released his second instrumental mixtape Sound of a Pioneer, which featured his most known instrumentals among other new tracks. On March 19, 2013, "Donald Trump" was certified Platinum by the RIAA. In May 2013, he was in the studio playing instrumentals for Kendrick Lamar, who he linked up with after producing "She Like" for Black Hippy cohort Schoolboy Q. He also produced three songs on The Game's October 2013 mixtape Operation Kill Everything.

== Discography ==
List of mixtapes
Title	Album details
Sap on da Beat	Released: December 15, 2009; Label: Self-released; Formats: Digital download
Surprise, Surprise	Released: February 17, 2012; Label: Epidemic; Formats: Digital download
Sound of A Pioneer	Released: October 16, 2012; Label: Epidemic; Formats: Digital download
Self Employed	Released: March 4, 2016; Label: Pioneer Crew; Formats: Digital download
Self Improved	Released: December 14, 2018; Label: Pioneer Crew; Formats: Digital download

== Production discography ==
=== Singles produced ===
List of singles as producer showing year released, performing artists and album name
Title	Year	Album
"Donald Trump" (Mac Miller)	2011	Best Day Ever
"Celebration" (The Game featuring Chris Brown, Tyga, Wiz Khalifa, and Lil Wayne)	2012	Jesus Piece
"Watching Movies" (Mac Miller)	2013	Watching Movies with the Sound Off
"One Eighty Seven" (Freddie Gibbs featuring Problem)	2013	Evil Seeds Grow Naturally
"Talkin' About" (Juicy J featuring Chris Brown and Wiz Khalifa)	2014	Stay Trippy
"STRICTLY4MYNIGGAZ" (Domo Genesis)	2014	Under the Influence 2
"B Boy" (Meek Mill featuring Big Sean and A$AP Ferg)		
"Master $uite" (Tyga)	2015	Fuk Wat They Talkin Bout
"Don't C Me Comin" (Tyga featuring A.E.)	2015	Fuk Wat They Talkin Bout
"Envy" (Dave East)	2020	Karma 3
