= Mac Miller and the Most Dope Family =

2013 American documentary TV series

- Genre: Documentary
- Starring: Mac Miller
- Country of origin: United States
- No. of seasons: 2
- No. of episodes: 14

Production
- Running time: 19 to 23 minutes (excluding commercials)

Original release
- Network: MTV2
- Release: February 26, 2013 – September 3, 2014

Mac Miller and the Most Dope Family is an American reality documentary television series on MTV2. The six episode series premiered on February 26, 2013 at 11:30/10:30c. Mac Miller and the Most Dope Family was then renewed for a second season, which premiered on July 23, 2014 and ended on September 3, 2014.

== Premise ==
The series encompasses Mac Miller as he settles into his new-found life in Los Angeles, California and creates his newest album, Watching Movies with the Sound Off. Even though he left Pittsburgh, Miller brought his four closest friends with him to California to enjoy his new mansion and create fresh adventures.

== Main cast ==
- Mac Miller
- Quentin "Q" Cuff — Mac's manager/business partner and close friend. Q worked with Mac to launch his REMember Music record label.
- James "Jimmy" Murton — Mac's oldest friend from Pittsburgh. He was one of the main staff of Mac's merchandise team. He is also known for his artistry with tattoos and graffiti.
- David Harley Jr. a.k.a. "Big Dave" — Mac's bodyguard and former NFL player, he met Mac while attending one of his concerts. He was born in Tallahassee, Florida.
- Brandon "Peanut" Herbert — Also a long-time friend of Mac, Peanut is another Pittsburgh native. He and Mac met through a mutual friend years back. Peanut moved out of the Mansion in-between seasons 1 & 2.
- Garrett Uddin a.k.a. "DJ Clockwork" — Mac's in-house DJ.
- Chelsea Fodero — Mac's day-to-day manager/assistant.

== Episodes ==
Season	Episodes	Originally released	
Season	Episodes	First released	Last released
1	6	February 26, 2013	April 2, 2013
2	8	July 23, 2014	September 3, 2014

=== Season 1 (2013) ===
No. overall	No. in season	Title	Original release date
1	1	"Man of Next Year"	February 26, 2013
2	2	"End of the World"	March 5, 2013
3	3	"Dope Sea Fishing"	March 12, 2013
4	4	"PA Nights"	March 19, 2013
5	5	"The Birth of Larry Lovestein"	March 26, 2013
6	6	"Leaving Las Vegas"	April 2, 2013

=== Season 2 (2014) ===
No. overall	No. in season	Title	Original release date
7	1	"Dope Dublin"	July 23, 2014
8	2	"No FOMO"	July 23, 2014
9	3	"Key to the City"	July 30, 2014
10	4	"Bucket Bet"	August 6, 2014
11	5	"The Dogfather"	August 13, 2014
12	6	"Xmas in LA"	August 20, 2014
13	7	"Hoorah Utah"	August 27, 2014
14	8	"Fear Factor"	September 3, 2014
