= Goosebumpz =

Promotional single by Mac Miller

from the album Watching Movies with the Sound Off
- Released: May 28, 2013
- Recorded: 2012
- Genre: Hip hop
- Length: 3:22
- Label: Rostrum
- Songwriters: Malcolm McCormick; Thomas Pentz
- Producer: Diplo

"Goosebumpz" is a song by American hip hop recording artist Mac Miller. It was released on May 28, 2013, as a promotional single from his second studio album Watching Movies with the Sound Off (2013). The song was produced by American producer Diplo, who sampled the horns from "Bulgarian Chicks" (2005) by Balkan Beat Box. "Goosebumpz" peaked at number 43 on the US Billboard Hot R&B/Hip-Hop Songs chart.

== Background ==
"Goosebumpz" produced by Diplo would be released as the third single from his second studio album Watching Movies with the Sound Off on May 28, 2013 along with the preorder of the album.

== Track listing ==
Digital single

No.	Title	Writer(s)	Producer(s)	Length
1.	"Goosebumpz"	Malcolm McCormick, Thomas Pentz	Diplo	3:22

== Charts ==
Chart (2013)	Peak position
US Bubbling Under Hot 100 (Billboard)	21
US Hot R&B/Hip-Hop Songs (Billboard)	43

== Release history ==
Country	Date	Format	Label
United States	May 28, 2013	Digital download	Rostrum Records
