= Watching Movies =

Single by Mac Miller

from the album Watching Movies with the Sound Off
- Released: May 25, 2013
- Recorded: 2013
- Genre: Hip-hop
- Length: 3:40
- Label: Rostrum
- Songwriters: Malcolm McCormick; Jonathan King
- Producers: Sap; Larry Fisherman

Mac Miller singles chronology
"S.D.S." (2013)	"Watching Movies" (2013)	"Diablo" (2013)

"Watching Movies" is a song by American hip hop recording artist Mac Miller. The song was released on May 25, 2013 as the second single from his second studio album Watching Movies with the Sound Off. The song was produced by Sap (who produced his debut single "Donald Trump") and by Miller under the alias Larry Fisherman. "Watching Movies" peaked at number 33 on the US Billboard Hot R&B/Hip-Hop Songs chart. A music video by Rex Arrow and Larry Fisherman was created for the single that features Miller succumbing to the materials associated with hip-hop.

== Background ==
On May 4, 2013, Mac Miller announced on Twitter that the second single off Watching Movies with the Sound Off would be titled, "Watching Movies" and produced by himself along with "Donald Trump" producer SAP. Three days later, Mac Miller confirmed that the track would be premiered on May 9, 2013, which he would follow through with. On May 25, the song would be released to retail as the album's second official single.

== Critical reception ==
"Watching Movies" was met with generally positive reviews from music critics. David Amidon of PopMatters spoke of the song saying, "It’s de facto title track "Watching Movies" that puts the whole Miller experience in its most positive light, however, as the SAP and Larry Fisherman beat swallows Miller like the Wizard of Oz tornado and tosses him into a magical world where he’s a fantastic facsimile of Curren$y and Wiz Khalifa rather than middling nasal white boy.

== Music video ==
On June 14, 2013, just four days shy of the album's release, Miller released the music video for "Watching Movies". MTV described the video as a cross between horror films and twerking. The Rex Arrow and Larry Fisherman directed video for, "Watching Movies" features Miller rapping among ghoulish, red-eyed men in robes and a pack of sexy, twerking women.

== Track listing ==
Digital single

No.	Title	Writer(s)	Producer(s)	Length
1.	"Watching Movies"	Malcolm McCormick, Jonathan King	Sap, Larry Fisherman	3:40

== Charts ==
Chart (2013)	Peak position
US Bubbling Under Hot 100 (Billboard)	7
US Hot R&B/Hip-Hop Songs (Billboard)	33

== Certifications ==
Region	Certification	Certified units/sales
United States (RIAA)	Gold	500,000^{‡}
^{‡} Sales+streaming figures based on certification alone.

== Release history ==
Country	Date	Format	Label
United States	May 25, 2013	Digital download	Rostrum Records
