= S.D.S. (song) =

Single by Mac Miller

from the album Watching Movies with the Sound Off
- Released: April 23, 2013
- Recorded: 2012
- Genre: Hip hop; wonky
- Length: 3:19
- Label: Rostrum
- Songwriters: Malcolm McCormick; Steven Ellison
- Producer: Flying Lotus

Mac Miller singles chronology
"The Way" (2013)	"S.D.S." (2013)	"Watching Movies" (2013)

"S.D.S." (Somebody Do Something) is a song by American hip hop recording artist Mac Miller. It was released on April 23, 2013, as the first single from his second studio album Watching Movies with the Sound Off (2013). The song was produced by Flying Lotus.

== Background ==
On March 9, 2013 Mac Miller announced that the first single from Watching Movies with the Sound Off would be "S.D.S.". He premiered a snippet of the song on the second episode of his reality show Mac Miller and the Most Dope Family.

== Music video ==
The music video premiered on MTV Jams on April 25, 2013. The music video features a guest appearance from actor Corey Feldman.

== Track listing ==
Digital single

No.	Title	Writer(s)	Producer(s)	Length
1.	"S.D.S."	Malcolm McCormick, Steven Ellison	Flying Lotus	3:19

== Chart performance ==
Chart (2013)	Peak position
Belgium (Ultratip Bubbling Under Flanders)	74
US Bubbling Under Hot 100 (Billboard)	9
US Hot R&B/Hip-Hop Songs (Billboard)	41

== Release history ==
Country	Date	Format	Label
United States	April 23, 2013	Digital download	Rostrum Records
