= Watching Movies with the Sound Off =

- The clean version of the cover has a cloth over the table covering the lower half of his body

Studio album by Mac Miller
- Released: June 18, 2013
- Recorded: 2012–2013
- Genre: Hip-hop
- Length: 61:36
- Label: Rostrum
- Producers: AdoTheGod; The Alchemist; Chuck Inglish; Clams Casino; Diplo; Earl Sweatshirt; Flying Lotus; ID Labs; J. Hill; Mac Miller; Pharrell Williams; Sap; Tyler, the Creator

Mac Miller chronology
Macadelic (2012)	Watching Movies with the Sound Off (2013)	Stolen Youth (2013)

Singles from Watching Movies with the Sound Off
- 1. "S.D.S." Released: April 22, 2013; 2. "Watching Movies" Released: May 25, 2013; 3. "Goosebumpz" Released: May 28, 2013

Watching Movies with the Sound Off is the second studio album by American rapper Mac Miller. It was released June 18, 2013, by Rostrum Records. The album continued his changes in musical sound that began with the mixtape Macadelic. Miller described the album as very introspective and very personal. It features guest appearances from Earl Sweatshirt, Ab-Soul, Action Bronson, Schoolboy Q, and Tyler, the Creator, among others. Production was handled primarily by Miller himself (under the pseudonym Larry Fisherman), among others such as Diplo, Tyler, the Creator, Flying Lotus, The Alchemist, Clams Casino, Earl Sweatshirt, J. Hill, Chuck Inglish, and Pharrell Williams.

Watching Movies with the Sound Off was supported by three singles, "S.D.S.", "Watching Movies", and "Goosebumpz", which peaked at number 41, 33, and 43 on the US Hot R&B/Hip-Hop Songs, respectively. The album received generally positive reviews from critics, who praised his new psychedelic hip-hop influence and improved lyricism. It also fared well commercially, debuting at number three on the US Billboard 200, selling 102,000 copies in its first week of sale.

== Background ==
On October 14, 2012, Miller announced that his second album, Watching Movies with the Sound Off, would be released in early 2013. The album title is derived from Miller's habit of making music in the studio while watching films on mute. When speaking of the album Miller said that it is "very introspective and very personal so it's kind of throwing it all out there and seeing what happens".

The album's cover artwork was released via Miller's website on May 8, 2013. The cover art features Miller sitting nude at a table, his convenient placement of the "Parental Advisory" avoiding any indecent exposure. The minimalistic cover has an apple sitting on the table, a flower-bearing ornament, and a golden cherub hanging from the ceiling. The cover art was designed by Malcolm McCormick. Complex ranked the cover at number 21 on their list of best album covers of 2013.

== Recording and production ==
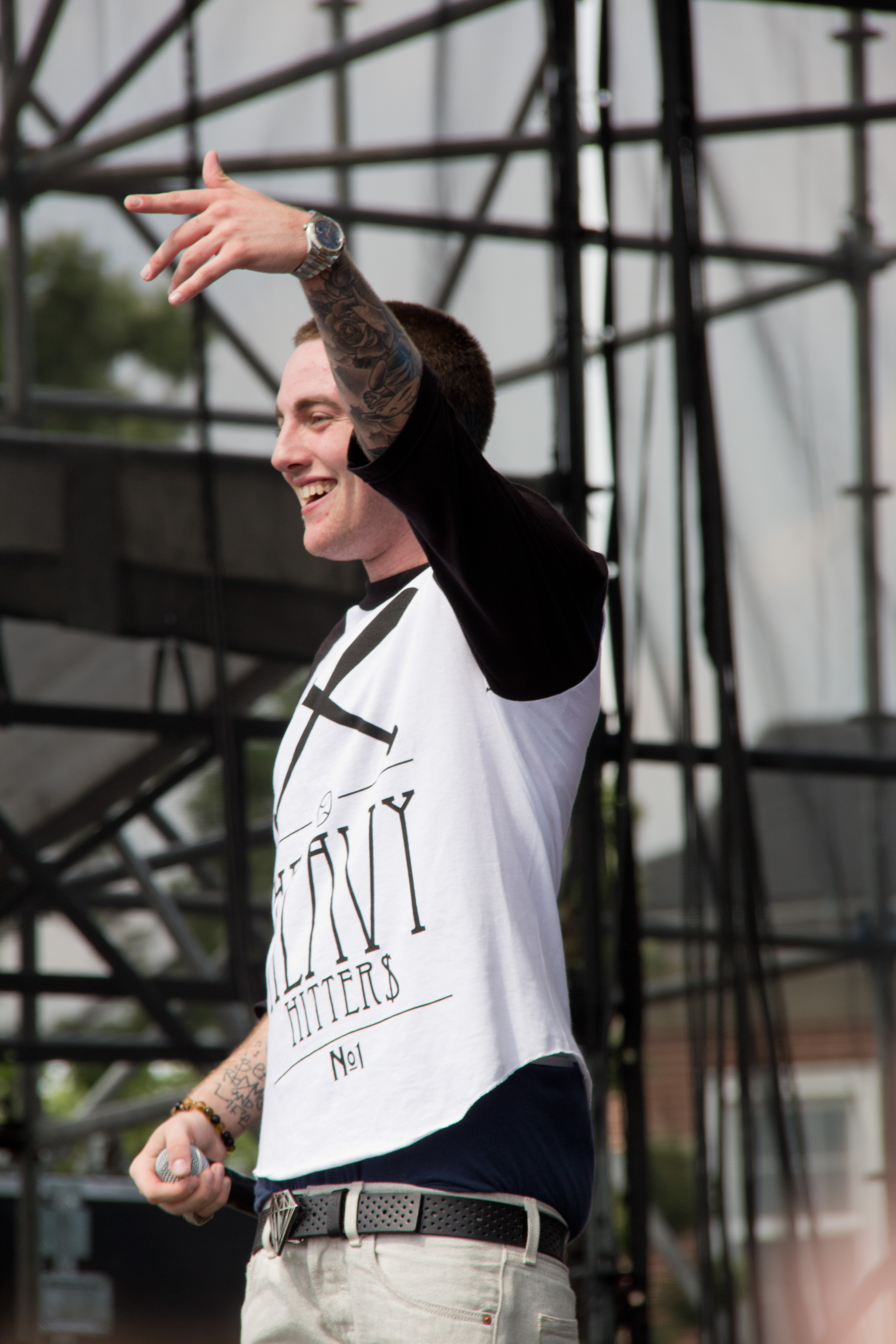
Mac Miller was the album's primary record producer, under his pseudonym Larry Fisherman.

Miller estimated that he recorded over 400 songs during the process of making the album. The majority were recorded in his home studio at his house in Los Angeles, California. On September 1, 2012, Miller released another free song called "PlaneCarBoat" which features West Coast rapper Schoolboy Q and was produced by himself.

Miller originally confirmed features on the album to include Schoolboy Q, Earl Sweatshirt, Ab-Soul, Cam'ron, Tyler, the Creator, Action Bronson, Casey Veggies, Kid Cudi, Gucci Mane and Loaded Lux. Miller and Schoolboy Q recorded nine songs during the album's recording process, of which only one made the album. He told MTV that Thundercat and Snoop Dogg would perform the outro on the album. The track listing was released on May 25, 2013, and revealed guest appearances on the album to include Earl Sweatshirt, Ab-Soul, Action Bronson, Schoolboy Q, Jay Electronica, Tyler, the Creator, Loaded Lux, Vinny Radio and Niki Randa. Miller said Jay Electronica's verse would be the last addition to the album, as he had received the verse only two hours before he was set to master the album.

This is the first album where Miller self-produced a large chunk of it under his alias Larry Fisherman. He said he was very self-conscious of his production on the album. The album's production was also handled by Pharrell Williams, Chuck Inglish, The Alchemist, Clams Casino, Earl Sweatshirt, Tyler, the Creator, Flying Lotus, J. Hill and Diplo among others.

== Release and promotion ==
In late 2012, Miller confirmed an early 2013 release date for the album. In a March 1, 2013, interview with MTV, Miller announced that he was close to finishing the album and that he would be releasing music videos in a few weeks. In late March 2013, Miller announced a release date of either May or June 2013, and said that the album was one song away from completion. He turned the album in to the label in late April 2013. On May 2, he announced via Ustream and Twitter that the album would be released on June 18, 2013.

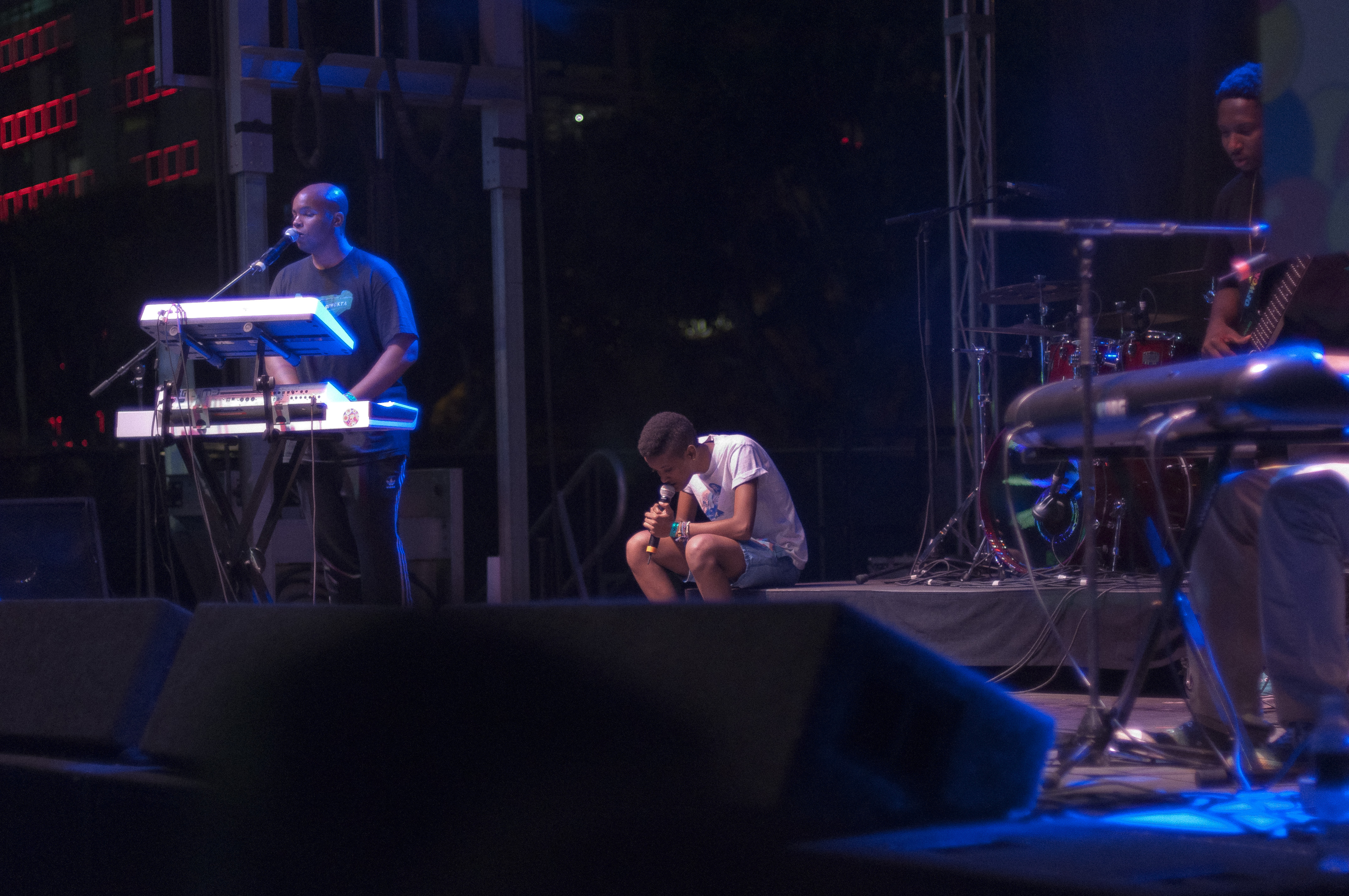
Odd Future sub-group The Internet accompanied Mac Miller as his live band, for the duration of The Space Migration Tour.

Miller released an iTunes exclusive EP entitled You under the name Larry Lovestein & The Velvet Revival on November 21, 2012. Soon after he announced his plans to release 92 Til Infinity with DJ Jazzy Jeff in early 2013 prior to the release of Watching Movies with the Sound Off. However, this release and his EP with Pharrell would be delayed till after the album. On March 4, 2013, Miller released a new mixtape solely featuring instrumentals made by himself titled Run-On Sentences Vol. 1 under his production alias "Larry Fisherman". All these projects were released in promotion of the album.

=== Tours ===
Miller announced his headlining The Space Migration Tour on May 7, 2013. The tour consisted of supporting acts Chance the Rapper, Earl Sweatshirt, Action Bronson, The Internet, Vince Staples, Meek Mill, and newly signed artists of Miller's new record label REMember Music. The tour began on June 25, 2013, and ran through July 18, 2013. Chance, Vince Staples and The Internet were featured on every date while the other acts made guest appearances on select shows. Recordings of nine songs performed during the tour and five previously unreleased tracks from the recording sessions for Watching Movies with the Sound Off was released as his first live album, Live from Space, on December 17, 2013.

On December 18, 2012, Lil Wayne announced that he would go on a European tour with Miller and 2 Chainz during March 2013, in promotion of his tenth studio album, I Am Not a Human Being II and 2 Chainz and Miller's albums. Later, on March 5, 2013, Wayne stated that the tour would be postponed until October 2013, in order for him to prepare better and to be able to fully promote his album. The tour featured 15 performances in 10 countries over the month.

=== Singles ===
On March 9, 2013, he announced that the first single from Watching Movies with the Sound Off would be "S.D.S.". He premiered a snippet of the song on the second episode of his reality show. The song is produced by Flying Lotus. Then on April 21, Miller announced that he would be releasing the song on April 23, 2013, and music video the following day. The song peaked at number 41 on the US Hot R&B/Hip-Hop Songs.

On May 4, 2013, Miller announced on Twitter that the second single off the album would be titled "Watching Movies" and produced by himself along with Sap. Three days later, Miller confirmed that the track would be premiered on May 9, 2013. Later that month on May 25, the song was released for digital download. Then the song's music video was released on June 14, 2013.

"Goosebumpz" produced by Diplo would be released as the album's third single on May 28, 2013. "Goosebumpz" peaked at number 43 on the US Hot R&B/Hip-Hop Songs.

=== Other songs ===
On June 25, 2013, the music video was released for "Objects in the Mirror". Then on July 8, 2013, the music video was released for "Gees" featuring Schoolboy Q. Two weeks later, the music video was released for "I Am Who Am (Killin' Time)" featuring Niki Randa. "The Star Room" received video treatment, being premiered on October 2, 2013. The video for "Youforia" followed later that month. Then on February 15, 2014, the music video was released for "Avian".

== Critical reception ==
Professional ratings
Aggregate scores
Source	Rating
AnyDecentMusic?	6.9/10
Metacritic	73/100
Review scores
Source	Rating
AllMusic	3.5/5 stars
Consequence	C+
Entertainment Weekly	B
Exclaim!	8/10
HipHopDX	4.0/5
NME	7/10
Pitchfork	7.0/10
Rolling Stone	3.5/5 stars
The Source	4/5
XXL	4/5

Watching Movies with the Sound Off was met with generally positive reviews. At Metacritic, which assigns a normalized rating out of 100 to reviews from professional publications, the album received an average score of 73, based on 17 reviews. Aggregator AnyDecentMusic? gave it 6.9 out of 10, based on their assessment of the critical consensus.

David Renshaw of NME said, "It's hard not to notice that the production outshines the delivery, with Pharrell and Diplo beats topped only by the slick 'SDS' courtesy of Brainfeeder boss Flying Lotus. At least it all diverts attention from that naked album cover, mind". David Jeffries of AllMusic stated, "Without the hooks or the lofty lyrics, the album seems made exclusively for Miller's fans or those who right-click indie rap mixtape links on the daily. Those audiences should find it an interesting trip, admirable artistic growth, and an attractive, entertaining step in the right direction. Others will likely be flummoxed".

Sean Ryon of XXL commented, saying, "Despite the disparity of styles, the album's sequencing affords it a greater sense of cohesion. Listeners will have little trouble transition between the booming "Watching Movies" and more subdued affairs like "Suplexes Inside of Complexes And Duplexes". This is due to Mac's excellent production throughout as Larry Fisherman". Nick Catucci of Rolling Stone stated, "On Watching Movies, he tosses in a chain saw: punch-drunk slow-and-arty beats he produced with Diplo, Flying Lotus and his pal Earl Sweatshirt. The often mesmerizing production may be a crafty way of distancing himself from Cheesy Mac, the party rapper responsible for the irresistible bro-down "Donald Trump"".

Kyle Anderson of Entertainment Weekly said, ""Objects in the Mirror" and "Aquarium" are surprisingly self-reflective, but the dumb-fun party jams are half as infectious as before, and twice as misogynistic". Chayne Japal of Exclaim! stated, "Mac Miller emphatically joins a higher tier of rap artists with Watching Movies, an effort that at once silences his detractors and rewards his faithful following". Mike Madden of Consequence stated that, "Watching Movies is Miller's most enduring, and endearing, project yet. I won't be worried if he decides to overhaul his sound again someday – I trust his artistic acumen now – but it would be nice to see him run with the aesthetic he found here". Craig Jenkins of Pitchfork said, "Watching Movies with the Sound Off is a quantum leap in artistry, but it's not without faults; the album's about three songs too long, and a couple of the tracks in the back end just plain run together".

=== Rankings ===
Closing out the year, Watching Movies with the Sound Off was named to multiple "Albums of the Year" lists by major publications. Complex ranked the album number 12 on their list of the 50 best albums of 2013. They commented saying, "Mac's greatest asset isn't his bars, it's his songwriting. When he actually moves away from the dusty, MF Doomy, Stones-Throwish beats that dominate the album, he not only diversifies his sound, he hits his full stride". The album was also named a runner-up for Album of the Year at the 2013 HipHopDX Year End Awards. They elaborated, saying, "Mac moved geographically and spiritually, and he also moved units. He wasted no time entrenching himself in the Left Coast music scene—primarily through his work with Odd Future members Earl Sweatshirt and The Internet".

Rolling Stone positioned it at number 19 on their list of the 20 best hip-hop albums of the year. They commented, saying, "Mac Miller surprised critics and fans alike with his experimental Album Two. The plucky Pittsburgh MC culled influences from everyone from Flying Lotus to Schoolboy Q, while showcasing his own brand of dusty, space-funk-influenced production". It was ranked at number 14 on XXL's list of the best albums of 2013. They elaborated saying, "Along with several guest appearances from Ab-Soul to Earl Sweatshirt and Action Bronson, Miller improved lyrically as he bridged the gap between hip-hop and party anthems with records such as "Gees" and "The Star Room", which displayed a much more strikingly viewpoint of an independent hip-hop artist". HipHopDX deemed it one of the top 25 albums of 2013 saying, "Mac Miller went far left for his 2013 effort. He credits a lot of the sonics to his own personal tastes, growth and a lot of time with Odd Future offshoots, The Internet. He mixed the same early bravado and experimentation from his debut into an album that didn't so much push the envelope as rip up the envelope and throw all of his influences in a blender".

== Commercial performance ==
In its first week of release, Watching Movies with the Sound Off sold 102,000 copies in the United States, debuting at number three on the Billboard 200. In its second week, the album dropped to number 14 on the chart, selling 23,000 more copies, bringing its two-week total album sales to 125,000 copies. In its third week, the album dropped to number 23 on the chart, selling an additional 13,000 copies. In its fourth week, the album dropped to number 24 on the chart, selling 10,000 more copies. As of September 2015, the album has sold 250,000 copies in the United States.

Watching Movies with the Sound Off earned 11,000 album-equivalent units in the week following Miller's death on September 7, 2018, allowing the album to re-enter the Billboard 200 at number 59. On April 26, 2019, the album was certified gold by the Recording Industry Association of America (RIAA) for sales and streams in excess of 500,000 units in the United States.

== Track listing ==
Watching Movies with the Sound Off standard edition
No.	Title	Writer(s)	Producer(s)	Length
1.	"The Star Room"	Malcolm McCormick; Thebe Kgositsile	randomblackdude	4:35
2.	"Avian"	McCormick; Eric Dan; Jeremy Kulousek; Zach Vaughan	Larry Fisherman	3:16
3.	"I'm Not Real" (featuring Earl Sweatshirt)	McCormick; Kgositsile	randomblackdude	3:23
4.	"S.D.S."	McCormick; Steven Ellison	Flying Lotus	3:04
5.	"Bird Call"	McCormick; Mike Volpe	Clams Casino	2:08
6.	"Matches" (featuring Ab-Soul)	McCormick; Herbert Stevens IV; Dan; Kulousek; Vaughan; Thomas Fec	ID Labs	2:58
7.	"I Am Who Am (Killin' Time)" (featuring Niki Randa)	McCormick; Niki Randa; Alex Lipinski	AdoTheGod	5:01
8.	"Objects in the Mirror"	McCormick; Pharrell Williams	Williams	4:19
9.	"Red Dot Music" (featuring Action Bronson)	McCormick; Ariyan Asllani; Alan Maman; Andrew Latimer; Susan Hoover	The Alchemist	6:07
10.	"Gees" (featuring Schoolboy Q)	McCormick; Quincy Hanley; Evan Ingersoll	Chuck Inglish	2:55
11.	"Watching Movies"	McCormick; Jonathan King; Gregory Mauro	Sap; Larry Fisherman	3:40
12.	"Suplexes Inside of Complexes and Duplexes"	McCormick; Timothy Thedford	Larry Fisherman	2:47
13.	"Remember"	McCormick; Oliver Sim; James Smith; Romy Madley Croft	Larry Fisherman	4:28
14.	"Someone Like You"	McCormick; Dan; Kulousek; Vaughan; Joseph Hill; Jose Lopez; Fabian Ordorica; Frank Stallworth; Andrea Landis	J. Hill; ID Labs	4:16
15.	"Aquarium"	McCormick; Dan; Kulousek; Vaughan; Ritz Reynolds; Merrill Garbus	Larry Fisherman	4:38
16.	"Youforia"	McCormick; Volpe	Clams Casino	4:01
Total length:				61:36

Deluxe edition
No.	Title	Writer(s)	Producer(s)	Length
17.	"Goosebumpz"	McCormick; Thomas Pentz; Ori Kaplan; Tamir Muskat; Vlada Tomova	Diplo	3:22
18.	"O.K." (featuring Tyler, the Creator)	McCormick; Tyler Okonma	Tyler, the Creator	2:40
19.	"Claymation" (featuring Vinny Radio)	McCormick; Leonard Moore; Dan; Kulousek; Vaughan	ID Labs	3:52
Total length:				71:30

10th Anniversary edition
No.	Title	Writer(s)	Producer(s)	Length
20.	"The Star Room (OG Version)" (with Earl Sweatshirt)	McCormick; Kgositsile	randomblackdude	4:24
21.	"The Quest"	McCormick; Jon Brion	Larry Fisherman	3:53
Total length:				79:47

Notes

- "Red Dot Music" features additional vocals by Loaded Lux
- "Suplexes Inside of Complexes and Duplexes" features additional vocals by Jay Electronica
- "Someone Like You" features vocals by Nylo

Sample credits

- "Matches" contains a sample of "Twin of Myself" as performed by Black Moth Super Rainbow, written by Thomas Fec.
- "Red Dot Music" contains a sample of "A Heart's Desire" as performed by Camel, written by Andrew Latimer and Susan Hoover.
- "Watching Movies" contains a sample of "You Are Dead" as performed by The End of Science, written by Gregory Mauro.
- "Remember" contains a sample of "Swept Away" as performed by The xx, written by Oliver Sim, James Smith, and Romy Madley Croft.
- "Someone Like You" contains a sample of "Someone Like You" as performed by Nylo, written by Jose Lopez, Fabian Ordorica, Frank Stallworth, and Andrea Landis.
- "Aquarium" contains a sample of "Powa" as performed by Tune-Yards from the album Whokill, written by Merrill Garbus.
- "Goosebumpz" contains a sample of "Bulgarian Chicks" as performed by Balkan Beat Box, written by Ori Kaplan, Tamir Muskat, and Vlada Tomova.
- "The Quest" contains a sample of "Phone Call" as performed by Jon Brion from the Eternal Sunshine of the Spotless Mind soundtrack.

== Personnel ==
Credits adapted from AllMusic.

- Ab-Soul – featured artist
- Action Bronson – featured artist
- Jay Electronica – featured artist
- Mac Miller – primary artist
- Vinny Radio – primary artist
- Niki Randa – featured artist
- Schoolboy Q – featured artist
- Earl Sweatshirt – featured artist
- Tyler, the Creator – featured artist

== Charts ==
=== Weekly charts ===
Chart performance for Watching Movies with the Sound Off
Chart (2013)	Peak position
Belgian Albums Chart (Flanders)	82
Canadian Albums (Billboard)	4
New Zealand Albums (RMNZ)	36
UK Albums (Official Charts)	56
UK R&B Albums (Official Charts)	5
US Billboard 200	3
US Independent Albums (Billboard)	1
US Top R&B/Hip-Hop Albums (Billboard)	3
US Top Rap Albums (Billboard)	3

=== Year-end charts ===
2013 year-end chart performance for Watching Movies with the Sound Off
Chart (2013)	Position
US Billboard 200	136
US Top Independent Albums	10
US Top R&B/Hip-Hop Albums	28
US Top Rap Albums	17

== Certifications ==
Certifications for Watching Movies with the Sound Off
Region	Certification	Certified units/sales
United States (RIAA)	Gold	500,000^{‡}
^{‡} Sales+streaming figures based on certification alone.

== Release history ==
Release dates and formats for Watching Movies with the Sound Off
Regions	Dates	Label(s)	Format(s)	Edition	Ref.
Australia	June 14, 2013	Rostrum; Universal	CD; digital download	Standard; deluxe	
Ireland	June 14, 2013	Rostrum; Universal	CD; digital download	Standard; deluxe	
New Zealand	June 14, 2013	Rostrum; Universal	CD; digital download	Standard; deluxe	
United Kingdom	June 17, 2013	Rostrum	CD; digital download	Standard; deluxe	
Canada	June 18, 2013	Rostrum	CD; digital download	Standard; deluxe	
Germany	June 18, 2013	Rostrum; Universal	CD; digital download	Standard; deluxe	
United States	June 18, 2013	Rostrum	CD; digital download	Standard; deluxe	
United States	December 16, 2016	Rostrum	Vinyl; LP	Limited	
