= Mac Miller =

American rapper (1992–2018)

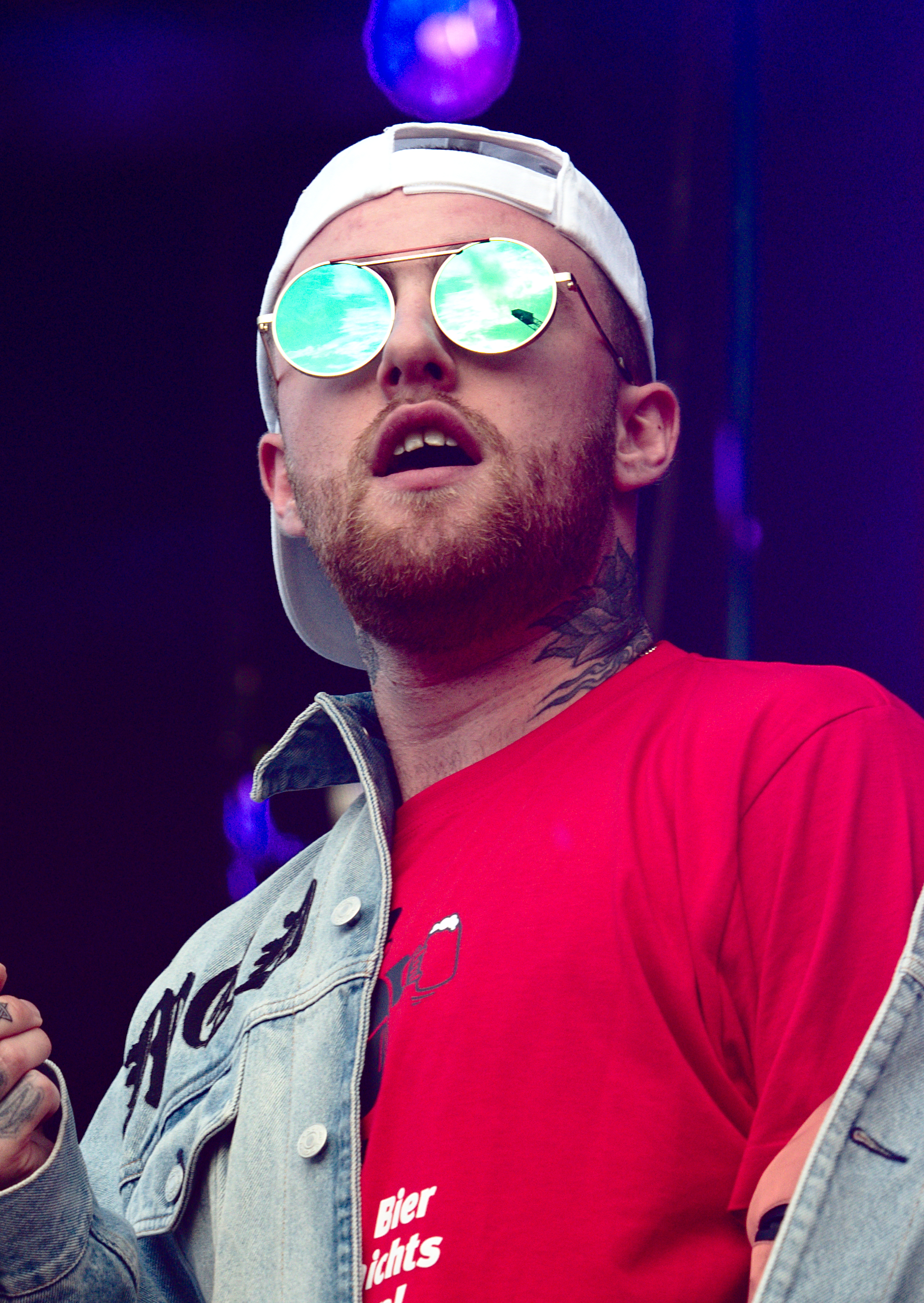
- Miller performing in 2017

Background information
- Also known as: Delusional Thomas; Easy Mac; Larry Fisherman; Larry Lovestein; The Velvet Revival
- Born: Malcolm James McCormick; January 19, 1992; Pittsburgh, Pennsylvania, U.S.
- Died: September 7, 2018 (aged 26) Los Angeles, California, U.S.
- Cause of death: Acute combined drug intoxication
- Genres: East Coast hip-hop; alternative hip-hop; jazz rap; frat rap (early)
- Occupations: Rapper; singer; songwriter; record producer
- Works: Discography; production
- Years active: 2007–2018
- Labels: Rostrum; REMember; Warner Bros.
- Website: macmillerswebsite.com

Malcolm James McCormick (January 19, 1992 – September 7, 2018), known by the stage name Mac Miller, was an American rapper, songwriter, and record producer. He began his career in Pittsburgh's local hip-hop scene in 2007, at the age of 15. In 2010, he signed a record deal with independent label Rostrum Records and released his breakthrough mixtapes K.I.D.S. (2010) and Best Day Ever (2011). Miller's debut studio album, Blue Slide Park (2011), became the first independently distributed debut album to top the US Billboard 200 since 1995.

In 2013, Miller founded the record label imprint REMember Music. After his second studio album, Watching Movies with the Sound Off (2013), he left Rostrum and signed with the major label Warner Bros. Records in 2014. With them, he released five studio albums: GO:OD AM (2015), The Divine Feminine (2016), Swimming (2018), and the posthumous albums Circles (2020) and Balloonerism (2025). For Swimming, he was posthumously nominated for a Grammy Award for Best Rap Album. Along with recording, he also served as a record producer for himself and other artists under the pseudonym Larry Fisherman.

Miller struggled with addiction and substance abuse, which was often referenced in his lyrics. He died from an accidental drug overdose of cocaine, fentanyl, and alcohol at his home at the age of 26.

== Life and career ==
=== 1992–2010: Early life and career beginnings ===
Malcolm James McCormick was born on January 19, 1992, in the Point Breeze neighborhood of Pittsburgh, Pennsylvania. He was a son of Karen Meyers, a photographer, and Mark McCormick, an architect, and had an older brother, Miller. The brothers had a Jewish mother and a Christian father. Miller was raised Jewish and had a bar mitzvah. He grew up playing basketball, football, soccer, and lacrosse. He attended Winchester Thurston School for a time but graduated from Taylor Allderdice High School.

At age 5, Miller was gifted a musical keyboard for Hanukkah and told his parents he wished to make music, recalling: "I hooked that thing up and never stopped playing it." A self-taught musician, Miller played piano, guitar, drums, and bass by the age of six. He first started rapping at the age of 14. Before that, he wanted to be a singer. In high school, he decided to focus on his rap career, later noting, "Once I hit 15, I got real serious about it and it changed my life completely ... I used to be into sports, play all the sports, go to all the high school parties. But once I found out hip-hop is almost like a job, that's all I did."

Originally going by the name of Easy Mac (often stylized as EZ Mac), he released his first mixtape But My Mackin' Ain't Easy in 2007 at the age of 15. In 2008, he and fellow Pittsburgh-based rapper Beedie formed the rap duo The Ill Spoken, and released their mixtape How High. The duo decided to part ways shortly after, in order to focus on their solo careers. By 2009, he rebranded himself as Mac Miller, and released two mixtapes: The Jukebox: Prelude to Class Clown and The High Life. At the 2010 Pittsburgh Hip Hop Awards, Miller won 21 & Under of the Year, and Best Hip Hop Video for "Live Free".

=== 2010–2013: Breakthrough ===
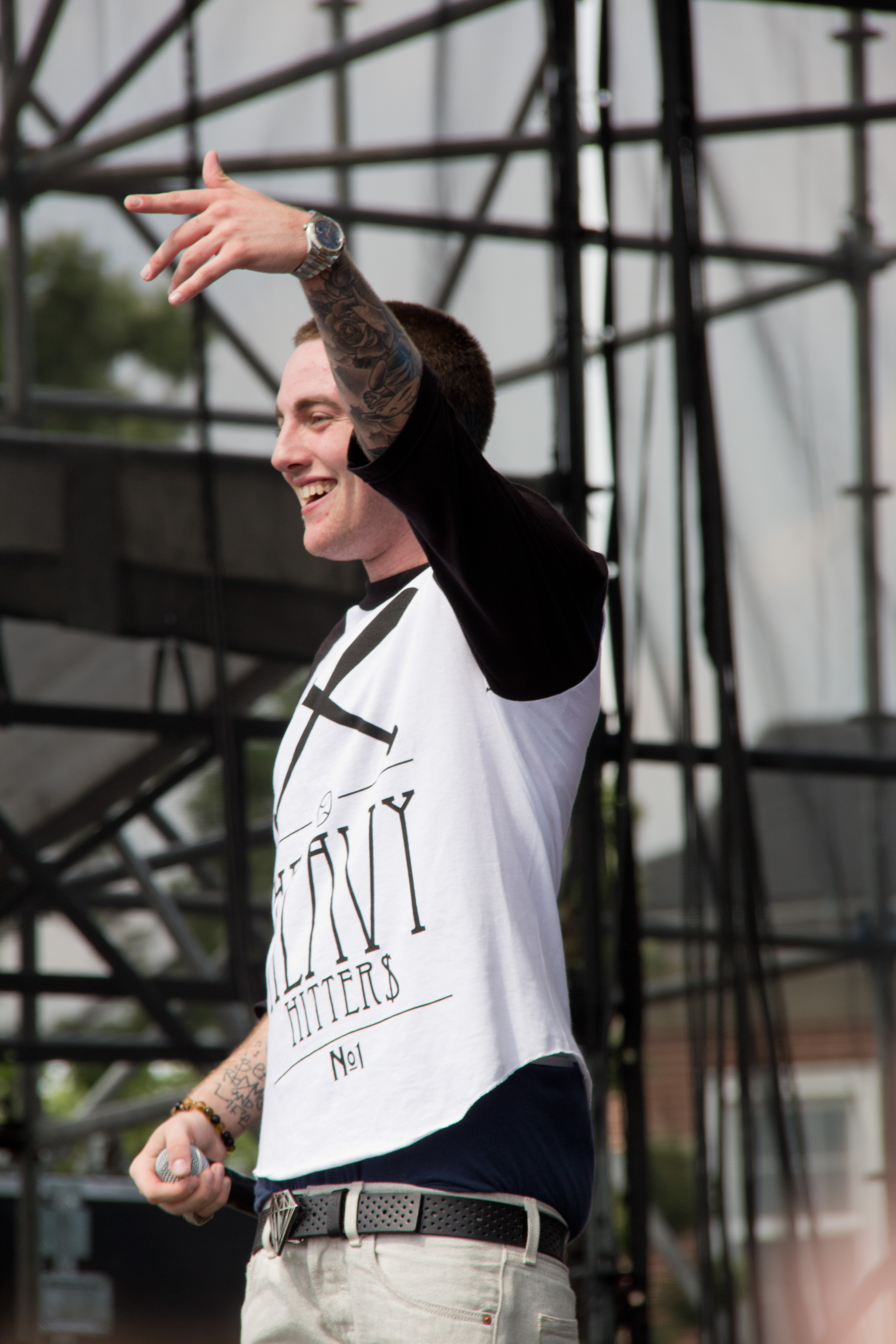
Miller performing at the NYC Governor's Ball in 2011

Miller signed with the independent Pittsburgh-based label Rostrum Records in July 2010, in the lead-up to his mixtape K.I.D.S. Rostrum president Benjy Grinberg met Miller while recording with Wiz Khalifa at ID Labs. Although Grinberg started giving Miller advice, he did not show interest in getting involved with his career until Miller began work on K.I.D.S., when he "noticed a maturation in his sound and approach to his music". By that point, Miller had started attracting interest from other record companies, but chose Rostrum due to its location in his hometown and association with Wiz Khalifa. K.I.D.S. was released by Rostrum in August 2010. During this time, Miller broke through with a focus on social media engagement, digital sales, and persistent touring, due to a lack of radio airplay or mainstream features.

XXL featured Miller in its annual "Freshman Class" list of 2011, alongside 10 other rappers including Kendrick Lamar and Meek Mill. Miller released his fifth mixtape, Best Day Ever, in March 2011. Its single "Donald Trump" became his first song to chart on the US Billboard Hot 100, peaking at number 75, and received a platinum certification from the Recording Industry Association of America (RIAA). Also in March 2011, he released a six-track EP, On and On and Beyond. Intended to target a new audience, four of its tracks were previously included on his mixtapes. The EP was his first entry into the US Billboard 200 albums chart at number 55. Leading up to the release of his debut studio album, and to celebrate reaching one million followers on Twitter, Miller released his sixth mixtape, I Love Life, Thank You, on October 14, 2011.

Miller's debut studio album, Blue Slide Park, released on November 8, 2011. With 144,000 first week sales, it debuted atop the Billboard 200, the first independently distributed debut album to do so since Tha Dogg Pound's Dogg Food in 1995. Three songs from the album, "Smile Back", "Frick Park Market", and "Party on Fifth Ave." charted on the Billboard Hot 100, peaking at number 55, 60, and 64, respectively. Blue Slide Park was certified gold in the United States and Canada. Despite its impressive commercial performance, Blue Slide Park received a generally mixed critical response.

On March 23, 2012, Miller released his seventh mixtape, Macadelic. The single "Loud" peaked at number 53 on the Billboard Hot 100. In mid-2012, Miller premiered two songs produced by Pharrell Williams, from a planned collaboration EP, Pink Slime. At least ten tracks were completed by August 2012 according to Miller, but the project was not released despite a multi-year effort. Miller released an EP, You, under the alias Larry Lovestein & The Velvet Revival on November 21, 2012. Rather than rap, the EP features Miller crooning over lounging jazz instrumentals.

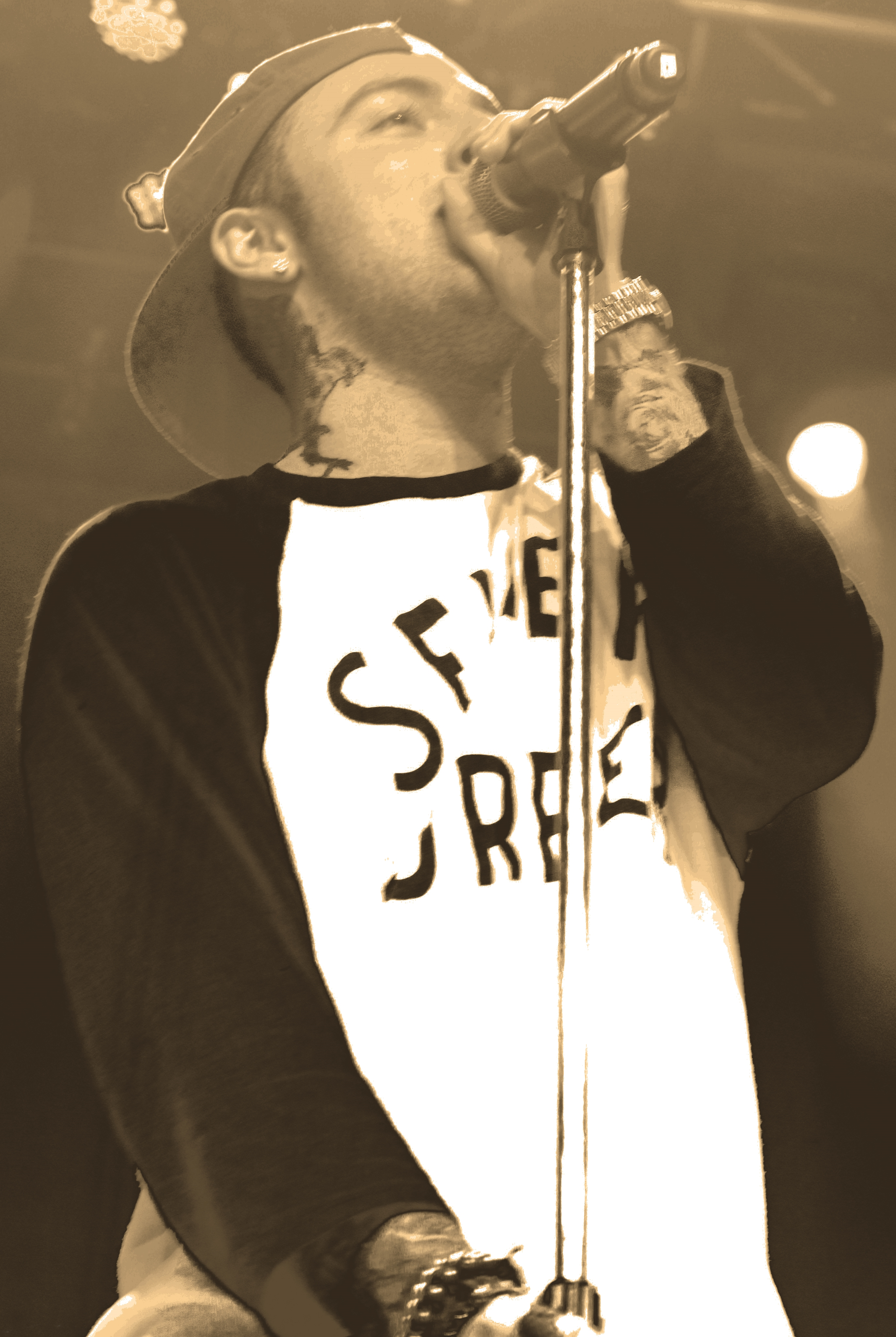
Miller on The Space Migration Tour in October 2013

In early 2013, Miller founded the record label imprint REMember Music, named after a deceased friend. The label primarily focused on Pittsburgh artists, as well as releases for Miller's alter-egos. Miller starred in his own reality series, Mac Miller and the Most Dope Family, on MTV2. It followed the production of his upcoming second studio album, and premiered on February 26, 2013. On March 4, 2013, Miller released a mixtape, Run-On Sentences, Volume One, solely featuring instrumentals made by himself, under his production alias Larry Fisherman. Later that month, Miller featured on singer Ariana Grande's lead single "The Way" for her debut album, Yours Truly; the song is Miller's highest peak on the Billboard Hot 100 at number nine, and was certified triple platinum by the RIAA.

His second studio album, Watching Movies with the Sound Off, was released on June 18, 2013. It received generally positive reviews, with most critics praising his new psychedelic sound. The album debuted at number three on the Billboard 200, selling 102,000 copies in its first week. The album spawned three singles; "S.D.S.", "Watching Movies" and "Goosebumpz". The album featured guest appearances from Schoolboy Q, Ab-Soul, Earl Sweatshirt, Tyler, the Creator, Action Bronson and Jay Electronica. According to Miller, the album is "very introspective and very personal so it's kind of throwing it all out there and seeing what happens."

Pittsburgh mayor Luke Ravenstahl presented Miller with a key to the city on September 20, 2013, and declared the date "Mac Miller Day". In collaboration with Vince Staples, Miller produced the mixtape Stolen Youth. Under the moniker Delusional Thomas, Miller self-produced and released an eponymous mixtape, Delusional Thomas, on October 31, 2013. On December 17, 2013, Miller released the live album Live from Space, containing nine songs performed with the band The Internet during his Space Migration Tour and five studio-recorded tracks that were cut from his second album.

=== 2014–2018: Major label work ===
Miller parted ways with Rostrum Records when his contract expired in January 2014. On May 11, 2014, Miller independently released his tenth solo mixtape, Faces. Colin Stutz of Billboard wrote that the 24-track mixtape "shows [Miller] introspective, ruminating over his drug use, fame and past." Pitchfork's Craig Jenkins called Faces his "most consistently honest and personal work to date". When later reflecting on the record in 2017, Miller acknowledged his heavy drug use during the creation of the record, stating that he was "not on planet earth when [he] made Faces." The second season of Miller's reality series Mac Miller and the Most Dope Family aired on MTV2 in mid-2014.

In October 2014, Miller signed a recording contract and distribution deal for REMember Music with the major label Warner Bros. Records. He chose Warner as it was "the most independent thinking" company he met with. Miller's third studio album and major label debut, GO:OD AM, was released on September 18, 2015. It charted at number four on the Billboard 200, with 87,000 album-equivalent units. The album and the single "Weekend", featuring singer Miguel, were certified gold and platinum by the RIAA, respectively. On December 29, 2015, Miller released a follow-up to his first instrumental mixtape under his alias Larry Fisherman, titled Run-On Sentences, Volume Two.

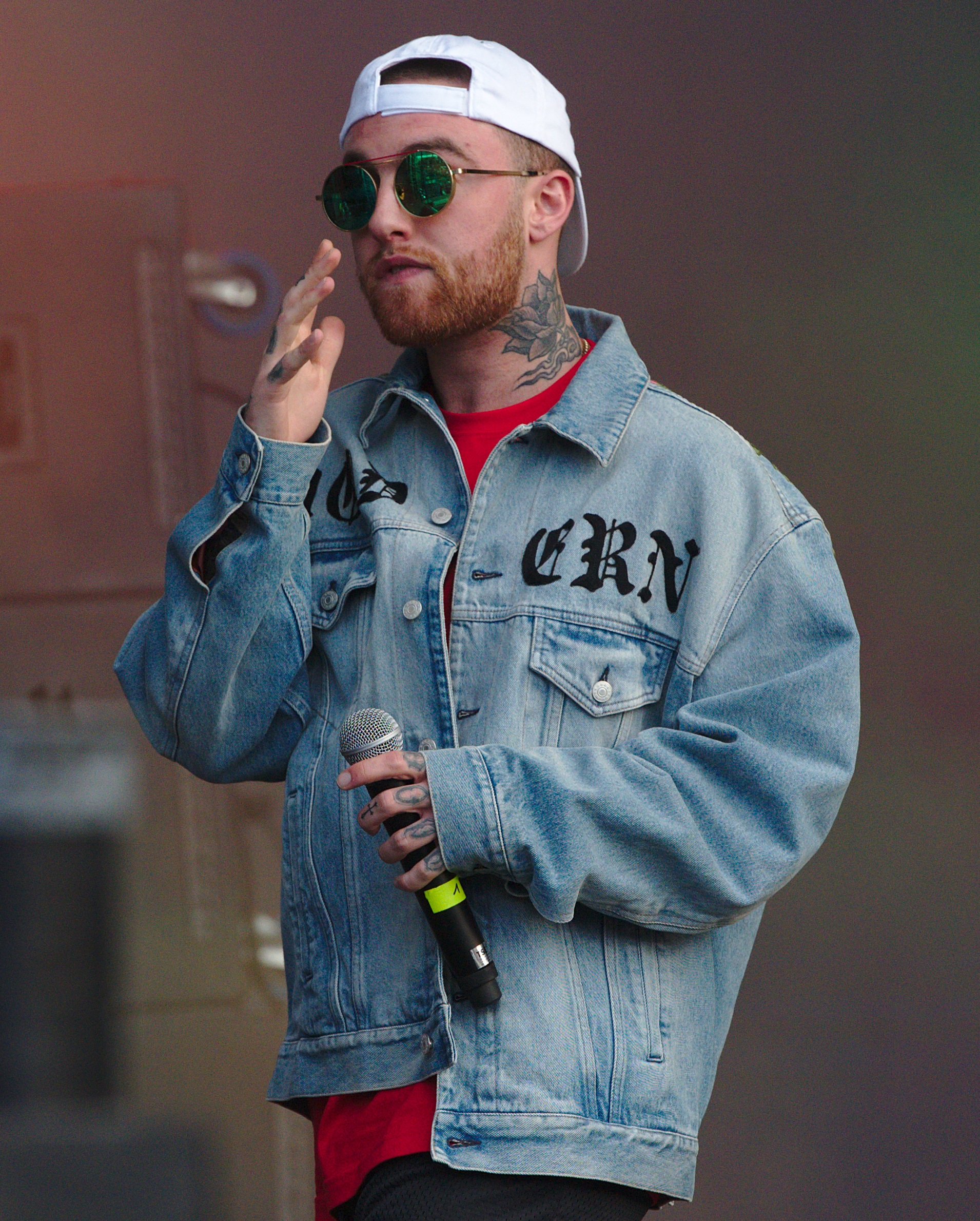
Miller performing at the 2017 Splash! festival in Germany

Miller began work on his next studio album immediately after completing GO:OD AM, wanting to explore the emotion of love. His fourth studio album, The Divine Feminine, was released on September 16, 2016. The album features Miller singing nearly as much as rapping, and incorporates genres such as R&B, jazz and funk. It received positive reviews, with Pitchfork stating that the album was succinct and refined in its portrayal of love, consequently accentuating Miller's artistry. The Divine Feminine debuted at number two on the Billboard 200 and number one on Billboard's Top R&B/Hip-Hop Albums chart with 48,000 units.

Miller's fifth studio album, Swimming, was released on August 3, 2018, to positive reviews from critics. Pitchfork described the album as consisting of "wistful soul and warm funk", through his exploration of heartbreak and his own mental health issues. Swimming debuted at number three on the Billboard 200 with 66,000 units, his fifth consecutive top five-charting album release in the United States. Miller's final public performances included an NPR Tiny Desk Concert released August 6, 2018, and a small promotional performance at Hotel Cafe in Hollywood on September 3, 2018, both in support of Swimming. After his death in September 2018, the single "Self Care" rose to number 33 on the Billboard Hot 100, his highest peak as a lead artist at the time. Swimming was nominated for Best Rap Album at the 61st Annual Grammy Awards.

=== Posthumous releases ===
Miller's estate began approving posthumous music releases in June 2019, with the collaborative singles "Time" with Free Nationals and Kali Uchis, and "That's Life" with 88-Keys and Sia. On January 8, 2020, Miller's family announced his first posthumous album, Circles, which was released later that month on January 17. Before his death, Miller had been working on the album as a companion album to Swimming. Production was completed by Jon Brion, who worked with Miller on both albums. Circles debuted at number three on the Billboard 200 with 164,000 units, his biggest week for an album. Its single, "Good News", became his highest-charting song as lead artist, peaking at number 17 on the Billboard Hot 100.

Between 2020 and 2023, Miller's estate commercially re-released his mixtapes K.I.D.S., Faces and I Love Life, Thank You. Tenth anniversary editions of K.I.D.S. and Watching Movies with the Sound Off were also released with previously unreleased bonus tracks. Miller's second posthumous album, Balloonerism, was released on January 17, 2025. The album was recorded in 2014 around the release of Faces.

== Artistry ==
=== Musical style and progression ===
Early in his career, Miller's music was widely regarded as "frat rap", with lyrics focusing on partying, smoking marijuana, and lusting after fame, money, and women. After the mixed critical response of Blue Slide Park, Miller began to employ a more expressive and experimental approach to his subsequent releases. By the release of Swimming, a review of Rolling Stone stated that Miller had shed his frat rap reputation.

Miller experimented with jazz in his career as well. In 2012, Miller released You, an EP featuring lounge-jazz tracks as Larry Lovestein and the Velvet Revival. Speaking about the Larry Lovestein persona, Miller stated "I've kinda have always had this random fantasy of being a seventy-year-old Lounge Jazz singer."

Toward the latter half of Miller's career, his music further implemented elements of jazz and additionally branched to funk and R&B. Faces incorporated jazz, while The Divine Feminine and Swimming have both been described by music publications as jazz rap. Rolling Stone writer Danny Schwartz also described Swimming as "spanning rap, funk, and trip-hop."

=== Influences ===
Miller included Big L, Lauryn Hill, Beastie Boys, Outkast, and A Tribe Called Quest among his influences. He had a close relationship with fellow Pittsburgh rapper Wiz Khalifa, saying "Wiz has been a big brother to me with this music thing so far. Our relationship is beyond music. He really is just my homie, whether I will be making music or not." Miller also expressed admiration for John Lennon. He had multiple tattoos of Lennon, including a tattoo of Lennon's face and a tattoo of his song "Imagine".

== Personal life ==
=== Relationships ===
Miller was in an on-again, off-again relationship with writer Nomi Leasure, whom he met in middle school, for seven years until 2016. Many of the songs on his mixtape Macadelic were about their relationship. Miller dated singer Ariana Grande from August 2016 to May 2018.

=== Health ===
Miller spoke openly about his struggle with substance abuse and depression. To manage stress during his Macadelic Tour in 2012, Miller began taking promethazine, and later became addicted to lean. Miller told Complex in January 2013: "I love lean; it's great. I was not happy and I was on lean very heavy. I was so fucked up all the time it was bad. My friends couldn't even look at me the same. I was lost." He quit taking promethazine in November 2012, before shooting his reality show Mac Miller and the Most Dope Family. In 2014, Miller was taking drugs daily, and felt that the final track on Faces, "Grand Finale", was "supposed to be the last song [he] made on Earth." Recounting that period to Billboard in August 2015, Miller appraised he had become "definitely way healthier" since then, but "not completely sober". After stating he "hated" being sober in a February 2016 documentary, Miller had become sober for three months by October 2016, noting his better mood and maintained creativity. However, when asked about his sobriety in April 2017, Miller said he was now "living regularly".

=== Legal issues ===
In February 2011, while on tour in Upstate New York, Miller and his friends were arrested for possession of marijuana for which they spent the night in jail. Miller said the case was "settled".

Producer Lord Finesse filed a $10 million lawsuit against Miller, Rostrum Records and DatPiff in July 2012, for the use of a sample of Finesse's song "Hip 2 Da Game" in Miller's 2010 mixtape song "Kool Aid & Frozen Pizza". In December 2012, the lawsuit was settled out of court with its stipulations kept confidential.

In 2013, after the success of his single "Donald Trump", Donald Trump publicly criticized Miller on social media for using his name in the song, calling it an "illegal" use and suggesting legal action. Trump's comments sparked a brief public dispute between the two, though no formal lawsuit was ever filed. Miller later distanced himself from Trump's politics and spoke critically of him in interviews while continuing his music career.

In March 2015, the band Aquarian Dream filed a $150,000 lawsuit against Miller for sampling their song "Yesterday (Was So Nice Today)" in the song "Therapy" that appeared on Miller's 2014 mixtape Faces.

Miller was arrested in May 2018 on charges of driving under the influence and hit and run after crashing into a utility pole and fleeing the scene with two passengers. Police obtained his address from his license plate number, and Miller confessed when police arrived at his home. He was taken into custody and released on $15,000 bail. In August 2018, Miller was charged with two counts of driving under the influence for the incident. Miller died before his arraignment, and the charges were dropped.

== Death ==
Death of Mac Miller
- Date: September 7, 2018; 8 years ago
- Time: 11:51 a.m. (PST)
- Location: Los Angeles, California, U.S.
- Type: Accidental drug overdose
- Deaths: 1 (Malcolm James McCormick, a.k.a. Mac Miller, aged 26)
- Accused: Cameron James Pettit
- Convicted: Ryan Michael Reavis; Stephen Andrew Walter
- Charges: Conspiring to distribute controlled substances resulting in death; Distribution of fentanyl resulting in death
- Verdict: Reavis and Walter: Pleaded guilty to distribution of fentanyl
- Sentence: Reavis: 10 years and 11 months in prison Walter: 17 and a half years in prison

On September 7, 2018, Miller was found unresponsive in his Studio City home by his personal assistant, who called 911 and performed CPR until paramedics arrived. Miller was pronounced dead at the scene at 11:51 a.m. (PDT). He had been scheduled to shoot a music video on the day of his death, and was to embark on his Swimming Tour in October.

A traditional Jewish funeral was held for Miller, and he was buried at Homewood Cemetery in his hometown of Pittsburgh. On November 5, 2018, the Los Angeles County Coroner's office determined that Miller died from an accidental drug overdose due to a "mixed drug toxicity" of fentanyl, cocaine, and alcohol. In his will, he named his mother, father, and brother as beneficiaries.

Thousands of fans held a vigil for Miller on September 11, 2018, at Pittsburgh's Blue Slide Park, the inspiration behind his debut album title; the site continues to be a place of remembrance. A tribute concert, Mac Miller: A Celebration of Life, took place on October 31, 2018, at the Greek Theatre in Los Angeles. Many of his friends and collaborators performed or provided messages at the concert; proceeds raised benefited the newly established Mac Miller Circles Fund, which aims to support youth arts and community-building programs in his memory. The charity had raised over $700,000 by January 2019. In May 2019, the renamed Mac Miller Fund issued its first grants, including $50,000 to MusiCares, which was used to launch their Mac Miller Legacy Fund to help young musicians with substance abuse issues.

Three men were arrested in September 2019 during an investigation into Miller's death. Cameron James Pettit allegedly sold Miller counterfeit oxycodone pills containing fentanyl two days before his death, which were run to Pettit by Ryan Reavis and supplied by Stephen Walter. Miller had asked Pettit for Percocet, a prescribed painkiller containing oxycodone, in addition to cocaine and Xanax. Investigators believe Miller snorted the laced pills before his death. The three men were indicted on charges of conspiracy and distribution of drugs resulting in death.

On April 18, 2022, Reavis was sentenced to ten years in prison for his role in distributing the pills. On May 17, 2022, Walter was sentenced to 17-and-a-half years in prison for his role. Pettit served an unknown sentence and was released from prison on October 11, 2024.

== Discography ==
Studio albums

- Blue Slide Park (2011)
- Watching Movies with the Sound Off (2013)
- GO:OD AM (2015)
- The Divine Feminine (2016)
- Swimming (2018)
- Circles (2020)
- Balloonerism (2025)

== Filmography ==
Film and television roles
Year	Title	Role	Notes	Ref.
2011	Single Ladies	Himself	2 episodes	
2012	Punk'd	Himself	Episode: "Mac Miller"	
2013, 2015	Ridiculousness	Himself	2 episodes	
2013–2014	Mac Miller and the Most Dope Family	Himself		
2013	Scary Movie 5	D'Andre	Film	
2014	Loiter Squad	Dave	Episode: "Stone Cold Stunner"	
2015	Hi, How Are You Daniel Johnston?	None	Short film; executive producer	
2019	Shangri-La	Himself	Episode: "Wrestling"; posthumous release	

== Awards and nominations ==
Award	Year	Category	Nominee(s)	Result	Ref.
BMI Urban Awards	2012	Social Star Award	Himself	Won	
Berlin Music Video Awards	2025	Best Animation	Balloonerism	Nominated	
Berlin Music Video Awards	2026	Best Animation	"She Knows Too Much"	Nominated	
Clio Awards	2026	Five Minutes and Over	Balloonerism	Gold	
Clio Awards	2026	Animation	Balloonerism	Gold	
Clio Awards	2026	Virtual/Augmented Reality	Balloonerism	Bronze	
Grammy Awards	2019	Best Rap Album	Swimming	Nominated	
Hungarian Music Awards	2026	Foreign Rap or Hip-Hop Album	Balloonerism	Nominated	
MTV Europe Music Awards	2012	Best Push Act	Himself	Nominated	
MTV Europe Music Awards	2012	Best US Act	Himself	Nominated	
MTV Video Music Awards	2025	Best Long Form Video	Balloonerism	Nominated	
mtvU Woodie Awards	2012	Woodie of the Year	Himself	Won	
mtvU Woodie Awards	2012	Performing Woodie	Himself	Won	
UK Music Video Awards	2025	Best Animation in a Video	Balloonerism	Won	
UK Music Video Awards	2026	Best Animation in a Video	"She Knows Too Much"	Pending	
