= Vince Staples discography =

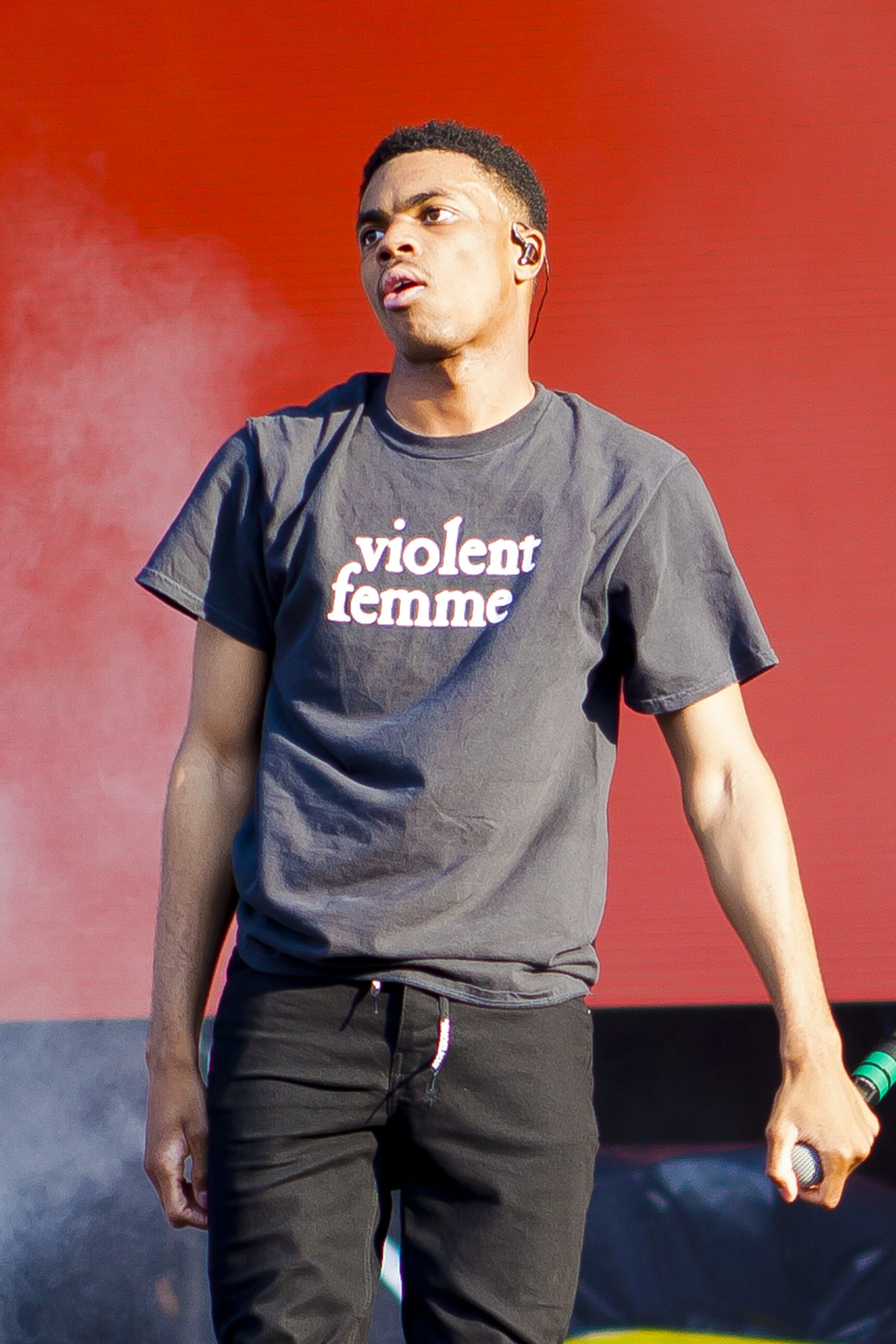
- Staples performing in December 2017
- Studio albums: 7
- EPs: 2
- Singles: 27
- Mixtapes: 4

American rapper Vince Staples has released seven studio albums, four mixtapes, two extended plays and 27 singles (including ten singles as a featured artist).

== Albums ==
=== Studio albums ===
List of studio albums, with selected chart positions
Title	Album details	Peak chart positions								
Title	Album details	US	US R&B/ HH	US Rap	AUS	CAN	IRE	NLD	NZ	UK
Summertime '06	Released: June 30, 2015; Label: Def Jam, ARTium, Blacksmith; Format: CD, LP, digital download	39	3	2	—	—	—	—	—	—
Big Fish Theory	Released: June 23, 2017; Label: Def Jam, ARTium, Blacksmith; Format: CD, LP, digital download	16	11	7	17	19	39	60	28	58
FM!	Released: November 2, 2018; Label: Def Jam, ARTium, Blacksmith; Format: LP, digital download	37	23	20	47	44	55	—	40	—
Vince Staples	Released: July 9, 2021; Label: Motown, Blacksmith; Format: Digital download, streaming	21	14	12	32	37	73	—	19	—
Ramona Park Broke My Heart	Released: April 8, 2022; Label: Motown, Blacksmith; Format: Digital download, CD, streaming	21	10	9	99	44	—	—	—	—
Dark Times	Released: May 24, 2024; Label: Def Jam, Blacksmith; Format: Digital download, streaming	69	22	19	—	—	—	—	37	—
Cry Baby	Released: June 5, 2026; Label: Loma Vista, Section Eight Arthouse; Format: Digital download, streaming	73	—	11	37	—	—	—	38	—
"—" denotes a recording that did not chart or was not released in that territory.

=== Mixtapes ===
List of mixtapes
Title	Album details
Shyne Coldchain Vol. 1	Released: December 30, 2011; Label: Self-released; Format: Digital download
Winter In Prague (with Michael Uzowuru)	Released: October 15, 2012; Label: Self-released; Format: Digital download
Stolen Youth (with Larry Fisherman)	Released: June 20, 2013; Label: Self-released; Format: Digital download
Shyne Coldchain II	Released: March 13, 2014; Label: Self-released; Format: Digital download

== EPs ==
List of extended plays, with selected chart positions
Title	Extended play details	Peak chart positions			
Title	Extended play details	US	US R&B/ HH	US Rap	AUS
Hell Can Wait	Released: October 7, 2014; Label: ARTium, Def Jam; Format: CD, digital download	90	15	7	—
Prima Donna	Released: August 26, 2016; Label: ARTium, Def Jam; Format: LP, digital download	50	6	5	35

== Singles ==
=== As lead artist ===
Title	Year	Peak chart positions			Certifications	Album
Title	Year	US R&B/HH Bub.	AUS	NZ Hot	Certifications	Album
"Vicoden"	2012	—	—	—		Non-album single
"Blue Suede"	2014	—	—	—		Hell Can Wait
"Hands Up"	2014	—	—	—		Hell Can Wait
"Señorita"	2015	—	—	—		Summertime '06
"Get Paid" (featuring Desi Mo)	2015	—	—	—		Summertime '06
"Norf Norf"	2015	—	—	—	RIAA: Platinum; RMNZ: Platinum	Summertime '06
"BagBak"	2017	—	—	—		Big Fish Theory
"Big Fish"	2017	10	82	—	RIAA: Gold	Big Fish Theory
"Rain Come Down"	2017	—	—	—		Big Fish Theory
"&Burn" (with Billie Eilish)	2017	—	—	—	RIAA: Gold; RMNZ: Gold	Don't Smile at Me
"Get the Fuck Off My Dick"	2018	—	—	—		Non-album singles
"So What?"	2019	—	—	—		Non-album singles
"Sheet Music"	2019	—	—	—		Non-album singles
"Hell Bound (Ad 01)"	2019	—	—	—		Non-album singles
"Law of Averages"	2021	—	—	22		Vince Staples
"Got 'Em"	2021	—	—	—		Pokémon 25: The Album
"Magic" (with Mustard)	2022	—	—	—		Ramona Park Broke My Heart
"Rose Street"	2022	—	—	—		Ramona Park Broke My Heart
"Lonnie P" (with The Alchemist)	2023	—	—	—		Non-album single
"Blackberry Marmalade"	2026	—	—	—		Cry Baby
"White Flag"	2026	—	—	—		Cry Baby
"—" denotes a recording that did not chart or was not released in that territory.

=== As featured artist ===
List of singles, with selected chart positions, showing year released and album name
Title	Year	Peak chart positions				Certifications	Album
Title	Year	US R&B/HH Bub.	US Dance	AUS	UK	Certifications	Album
"Elimination Chamber" (Domo Genesis and the Alchemist featuring Earl Sweatshirt, Vince Staples, and Action Bronson)	2012	—	—	—	—		No Idols
"Hive" (Earl Sweatshirt featuring Casey Veggies and Vince Staples)	2013	7	—	—	—		Doris
"Kingdom" (Common featuring Vince Staples)	2014	—	—	—	—		Nobody's Smiling
"Ghost" (With You. featuring Vince Staples)	2015	—	39	—	—		Non-album single
"Smoke & Retribution" (Flume featuring Vince Staples and Kučka)	2016	—	18	23	183	RMNZ: Gold	Skin
"Only Girl" (Kali Uchis featuring Steve Lacy and Vince Staples)	2016	—	—	—	—		Non-album single
"All Nite" (Clams Casino featuring Vince Staples)	2016	—	—	—	—		32 Levels
"Little Bit of This" (GTA featuring Vince Staples)	2016	—	—	—	—		Good Times Ahead
"Ascension" (Gorillaz featuring Vince Staples)	2017	—	—	—	91		Humanz
"Playboy" (Tyga featuring Vince Staples)	2017	—	—	—	—		BitchImTheShit2
"Secret" (Raveena featuring Vince Staples)	2022	—	—	—	—		Asha's Awakening
"The Caliphate" (Earl Sweatshirt and the Alchemist featuring Vince Staples)	2023	—	—	—	—		Voir Dire
"Pass the Salt" (Joy Crookes featuring Vince Staples)	2025	—	—	—	—		Non-album single
"—" denotes a recording that did not chart or was not released in that territory.

== Other charted songs ==
Title	Year	Peak chart positions				Album
Title	Year	US Bub.	US R&B/HH	CAN	NZ Hot	Album
"Yeah Right"	2017	—	—	—	— (Note: "Yeah Right" did not enter the NZ Top 40 Singles Chart or the NZ Hot Singles Chart, but peaked at number seven on the NZ Heatseeker Singles Chart.)	Big Fish Theory
"Opps" (with Yugen Blakrok)	2018	2	49	90	—	Black Panther: The Album
"Feels Like Summer"	2018	—	—	—	31	FM!
"Don't Get Chipped"	2018	—	—	—	39	FM!
"Run the Bands"	2018	—	—	—	38	FM!
"Fun!"	2018	—	—	—	34	FM!
"Are You with That?"	2021	12	46	—	15	Vince Staples
"Sundown Town"	2021	—	—	—	26	Vince Staples
"The Shining"	2021	—	—	—	29	Vince Staples
"Take Me Home" (with Fousheé)	2021	—	—	—	28	Vince Staples
"When Sparks Fly"	2022	—	—	—	38	Ramona Park Broke My Heart
"Lemonade" (featuring Ty Dolla Sign)	2022	—	—	—	37	Ramona Park Broke My Heart
"Stuntman" (Tyler, the Creator featuring Vince Staples)	2023	14	39	—	—	Call Me If You Get Lost: The Estate Sale
"—" denotes a recording that did not chart or was not released in that territory.

== Guest appearances ==
List of non-single guest appearances with other performing artists, showing year released and album name
Title	Year	Other artist(s)	Album
"epaR"	2010	Earl Sweatshirt	Earl
"Moracular World"	2010	Mike G	Ali
"LunchBox"	2010	The Jet Age of Tomorrow, Jay Cue	Journey to the 5th Echelon
"Moracular World"	2011	Mike G	The Award Tour EP
"Carrera"	2011	Mike G	The Award Tour EP
"Award Tour"	2011	Mike G	The Award Tour EP
"Vicks"	2011	Mike G	The Award Tour EP
"Michael Douglas"	2011	Mike G, Speak!	The Award Tour EP
"Whatever"	2011	Speak!	Inside Out Boy
"Lunchbox"	2011	Jay Cue	Pyramid Life
"Dank"	2011	Speak!	—N/a
"Two-Tone"	2011	Speak!	—N/a
"Dumb Young Nigga"	2012	A$ton Matthews	NOFVCKSGIVEN
"Cutthroat"	2012	Joey Fatts	Chipper Jones EP Vol. 1
"Hate"	2012	SK' La Flare	Lost Tapes of Atlantis Vol. 1
"I Ain't Happy"	2012	Cashius Green	Sunny Side Up
"Charles Barkley"	2012	Clayton Samus	The Lovely Savage
"Black Sheep"	2012	Clayton Samus	The Lovely Savage
"La Cienega"	2012	Da$H, RetcH	La Cienega
"Elenor"	2012	Pyramid Vritra, Jay Cue, Matt Martians, The RoseGold Dutch Masters	—N/a
"Trappin'"	2013	Kilo Kish	K+
"Wonderful World"	2013	The Jet Age of Tomorrow, Domo Genesis	JellyFish Mentality
"Lindo"	2013	Joey Fatts	Chipper Jones EP Vol. 2
"Burgundy"	2013	Earl Sweatshirt	Doris
"Centurion"	2013	Earl Sweatshirt	Doris
"The Vapors"	2013	Jhené Aiko	Sail Out
"Far"	2013	Key Nyata	The Shadowed Diamond
"Give Me a Reason"	2013	Boldy James, the Alchemist	My 1st Chemistry Set
"Aristocratic Anarchy"	2013	Da$H	V.I.C.E.S
"Never"	2013	Khmer Tay	—N/a
"Chapo"	2014	A$ton Matthews	A$ton 3:16
"Out on Bond"	2014	Common	Nobody's Smiling
"The Dark Room"	2014	Dilated Peoples	Directors of Photography
"Rain"	2014	Mac Miller	Faces
"Made"	2014	Bad Rabbits	CONS EP Vol. 2
"Million $ Dreams"	2014	Joey Fatts	Chipper Jones Vol. 3
"Hell Yeah"	2014	Rag'n'Bone Man	WOLVES
"Amen Brother"	2014	Mac Miller, Ab-Soul, Da$H, RetcH	—N/a
"Nebraska"	2014	Earl Sweatshirt, Mac Miller	—N/a
"Pathetic (Remix)"	2014	Erik Hassle	—N/a
"Grizzly"	2015	Clayton Samus	Natural
"Wool"	2015	Earl Sweatshirt	I Don't Like Shit, I Don't Go Outside: An Album by Earl Sweatshirt
"High"	2015	Christian Rich, BiA	FW14
"Mind Trap"	2015	Audio Push, Casey Veggies	Good Vibe Tribe
"Sizzurp"	2015	Mike G	Verses II
"Get the Money"	2015	Ghostface Killah, Adrian Younge	Twelve Reasons to Die II
"Against the Time"	2015	Wynter Gordon	Five Needle
"Waiting for My Moment"	2015	Donald Glover, Jhené Aiko, Ludwig Göransson	Creed: Original Motion Picture Soundtrack
"Suffer (Remix)"	2016	Charlie Puth, AndreaLo	—N/a
"Ride Out"	2016	ScHoolboy Q	Blank Face LP
"Nothing Burns Like the Cold"	2017	Snoh Aalegra	Feels
"Give It All"	2018	With You., Santigold	Power Rangers
"Home"	2018	—N/a	Spider-Man: Into the Spider-Verse
"Ice Cold (Final Round)"	2018	Mike Will Made It, Ludwig Göransson	Creed II: The Album
"Ain't Talkin' Bout Nothing"	2018	E-40, G Perico	The Gift of Gab
"Blue People"	2019	03 Greedo, Kenny Beats	Netflix & Deal
"Yo Love"	2019	Mereba, 6lack	Queen & Slim: The Soundtrack
"Rembrandt...Run It Back"	2019	JID, J. Cole	Revenge of the Dreamers III
"Pressure in My Palms"	2020	Aminé, Slowthai	Limbo
"Up Up Away"	2020	JID, EarthGang	Revenge of the Dreamers III: Director's Cut
"In My Stussy's"	2020	Lil Yachty	Lil Boat 3.5
"Surf & Turf"	2020	Boldy James, the Alchemist	The Price of Tea in China
"Young World"	2020	Royce da 5'9", G Perico	The Allegory
"Sauce"	2020	Reason	New Beginnings
"6 Five Heartbeats"	2021	the Alchemist	This Thing of Ours 2
"Back and Forth"	2021	Emotional Oranges	The Jukebox
"Real Affair (Remix)"	2021	Tiana Major9	At Sixes and Sevens Remixed
"New Tricks: Art, Aesthetics and Money”	2022	Kilo Kish	American Gurl
"Stuntman”	2023	Tyler, the Creator	Call Me If You Get Lost: The Estate Sale
"Mancala"	2023	Earl Sweatshirt, the Alchemist	Voir Dire
"Know Better"	2024	Kehlani, Lil Mo	While We Wait 2
"Pressured Up"	2024	Mustard, Schoolboy Q	Faith of a Mustard Seed
"New Black History"	2024	JPEGMafia	I Lay Down My Life for You
"California Dream"	2024	Ab-Soul, Kamm Carson	Soul Burger
"VCRs"	2025	JID	God Does Like Ugly
"Who You Are"	2026	Dahi, Channel Tres, French Anthony	Black Boy (Alternative)
