= Dark Times (album) =

Studio album by Vince Staples
- Released: May 24, 2024
- Genre: West Coast hip-hop
- Length: 35:00
- Label: Blacksmith; Def Jam
- Producer: Julian Ali; Benny Bock; Brazzen; Cardo; Alex Goose; Joe Harrison; Mike Hector; Jay Versace; J.Lbs; Matty Michna; Tyler Page; Rahm; Saint Mino; LeKen Taylor; Teej; Michael Uzowuru; Xavi

Vince Staples chronology
Ramona Park Broke My Heart (2022)	Dark Times (2024)	Cry Baby (2026)

Singles from Dark Times
- 1. "Shame on the Devil" Released: May 20, 2024

Dark Times is the sixth studio album by American rapper Vince Staples. It was released on May 24, 2024, through Blacksmith Records and Def Jam Recordings. It marks his first release on Def Jam since FM! (2018), and is also his final release with the label. Production was primarily handled by longtime collaborators Michael Uzowuru and LeKen Taylor, alongside Cardo, Jay Versace, and Saint Mino, among others. It marks his first album to not feature any guest vocalists, (Note: Guest appearances on Big Fish Theory and FM! are uncredited.) although Kilo Kish, Santigold, Baby Rose and Maddy Davis provide additional contributions.

The album was promoted by the single "Shame on the Devil", as well as the Black in Europa and Black in America tours.

== Background ==
Vince Staples was discovered by Dijon "LaVish" Samo and Chuck Wun, alongside his cousin Campbell Emerson. LaVish took Staples on a trip to Los Angeles, where he befriended the Odd Future collective's members Syd tha Kyd, Mike G, and Earl Sweatshirt. Although he had not intended to become a rapper, he made some guest appearances on their songs, most notably "epaR" from Earl Sweatshirt's March 2010 mixtape Earl. Staples released his official debut mixtape Shyne Coldchain Vol. 1 on December 30, 2011, via applebird.com; and also released a collaborative mixtape with producer Michael Uzowuru, titled Winter in Prague in October 2012. After making three appearances on Earl's debut studio album, Doris, the next year, including the single "Hive", the liner notes revealed Staples had recently signed to the hip hop record label Def Jam Recordings, falling under producer No I.D.'s ARTium imprint, as well as Blacksmith Records. The mixtape Shyne Coldchain II was released on March 13, 2014, seven months after the signing was revealed.

After releasing his first three albums Summertime '06, Big Fish Theory and FM! on Def Jam, Staples signed a new deal with the Motown record label, releasing his eponymous fourth album and Ramona Park Broke My Heart respectively in 2021 and 2022. In March 2024, Staples announced a European tour called Black in Europa, which would be scheduled to kick off in June in Cologne. When interviewed by radio DJ Big Boy the next month, Staples revealed that he would release a new album before his tour.

On May 19, 2024, Staples announced the album's title, cover and tracklist via X and Instagram, while also previewing a snippet of the lead single "Shame on the Devil", which would be released the following day, with vocals from Baby Rose.

He headlined the Black in America tour alongside Baby Rose in support of the album, starting in Atlanta on October 5, 2024, and concluding in Los Angeles on November 6, 2024.

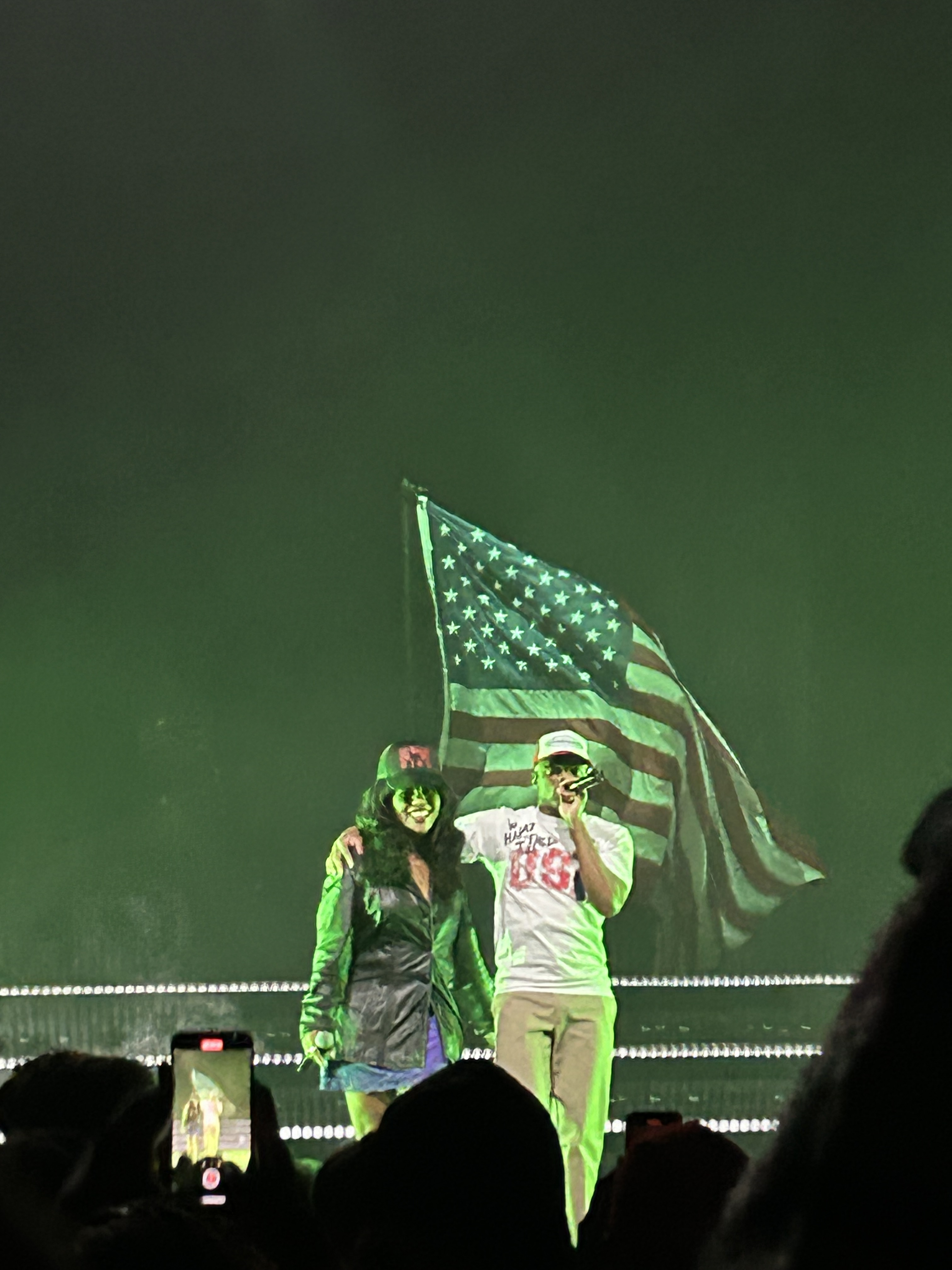
Vince Staples and Baby Rose performing at The Anthem in Washington, D.C. in October 2024 for the Black in America Tour in support of the album

== Critical reception ==
Professional ratings
Aggregate scores
Source	Rating
AnyDecentMusic?	7.6/10
Metacritic	82/100
Review scores
Source	Rating
AllMusic	4/5 stars
Beats Per Minute	80%
Clash	8/10
The Daily Telegraph	4/5 stars
Exclaim!	8/10
The Line of Best Fit	9/10
Pitchfork	7.6/10
Rolling Stone	3/5 stars
Slant Magazine	4/5 stars
Variety	Positive

Dark Times was met with universal acclaim from critics. At Metacritic, which assigns a normalized rating out of 100 to reviews from professional publications, the album received an average score of 82, based on 11 reviews. Aggregator AnyDecentMusic? gave it 7.6 out of 10, based on their assessment of the critical consensus.

Reviewing the album for AllMusic, Fred Thomas described Staples performance as "Seemingly effortless" and claimed he was, "in top form." He also called it, "another chapter of his uniquely smoke-colored narratives, form-fitting production, and perfectly balanced expressions of heaviness and acceptance."

Writing for Beats Per Minute, John Amen commented, "If Staples' self-titled introduced us to the artist's ability to interrogate a limbo, Dark Times is more detailed and specific in its mission and references; as a result, he seems less guarded, more vulnerable". Amen concluded, "Staples dances between despair and the commitment to continue searching – for inspiration, equanimity, for a sense of wholeness, as elusive as that may be".

In Exclaim!'s review, writer Wesley McLean noted that the album plays like a fitting conclusion to the trilogy beginning with 2021's Vince Staples, elaborating that " In the three acts of this unofficial trilogy, Staples has given us his self-portrait, followed by a world-building love letter to his hometown and insular reflections on his life experiences and their effect on him." Mosi Reeves' review for Rolling Stone concludes: "It feels brave for Staples to reach towards new depths of understanding about his life and the people he encounters."

Peter Berry of Variety described the album as "equal parts bleak and merciful" and "a lucid snapshot of melancholy" with "swirling dreary beats with even more overcast thoughts" that "presents a meticulous portrait of someone with just enough reason to wait for sunrise."

Anthony Fantano gave Dark Times a rating of a Light 8, stating that he felt the album was "Vince's most big-picture record to date", although he stated some tracks on the album left him "wanting more".

Critics' year-end rankings of Dark Times
Publication	List	Rank	Ref.
Business Insider	Best Albums of 2024	19	
Exclaim!	50 Best Albums of 2024	20	
Billboard	The 50 Best Albums of 2024	30	
Consequence	50 Best Albums of 2024	36	
Complex	The 50 Best Albums of 2024	32	
Paste	The 100 Best Albums of 2024	8	
Rolling Stone	The 100 Best Albums of 2024	75	
Uproxx	The Best Albums Of 2024	—N/a	

== Track listing ==
Dark Times track listing
No.	Title	Writer(s)	Producer(s)	Length
1.	"Close Your Eyes and Swing"	Vincent Staples; Grecia Alfaro; Tyler Page; LeKen Taylor	Brazzen; Taylor; Page	0:31
2.	"Black&Blue"	Staples; Robert Davis; Marcus Edwards; Alejandro Garcia; Alex Goose; Josh Lane; Sal Samano; Rahm Silverglade; Taylor; Michael Uzowuru	Goose; Uzowuru; Rahm^{[a]}; Taylor^{[a]}	3:18
3.	"Government Cheese"	Staples; Frank Dukes; Taylor	Taylor	2:45
4.	"Children's Song"	Staples; Mino Drerup; Afolabi Osinulu; Page; Taylor; Uzowuru	Uzowuru; Saint Mino; Teej; Taylor^{[a]}; Page^{[a]}	2:12
5.	"Shame on the Devil"	Staples; Drerup; Joe Harrison; Page; Uzowuru	Saint Mino; Page^{[p]}; Harrison; Uzowuru	3:25
6.	"Étouffée"	Staples; Jahlil Gunter; Mike Hector; Antoine Lee	Jay Versace; Hector; Whosantoine^{[a]}	4:28
7.	"Liars"	Staples; James Baldwin; Silverglade; Darian Thomas; Kiah Victoria	Rahm	0:57
8.	"Justin"	Staples	Taylor	2:04
9.	"Radio"	Staples; Marvin Gaye; Ronald LaTour Jr.; Tom Merriman; Page; Jason Pounds; Taylor	Cardo; J.Lbs; Taylor^{[a]}; Page^{[a]}^{[v]}; Caleb Laven^{[v]}	2:56
10.	"Nothing Matters"	Staples; Page; Taylor; Uzowuru	Taylor; Uzowuru^{[a]}; Page^{[a]}	2:42
11.	"Little Homies"	Staples; Kaelin Ellis; Taylor	Taylor; Ellis^{[a]}	3:44
12.	"Freeman"	Staples; Drerup; Courageous Herrera; Matty Michna; Taylor; Zachary Sekoff; Manny Solas; Taylor; Uzowuru	Michna; Uzowuru; Saint Mino; Xavi; Taylor^{[a]}; Sekoff^{[a]}	2:34
13.	"Why Won't the Sun Come Out?"	Staples; Santi White; Benjamin Bock; Laven; Page; Julian Ali Rapaport; Ely Weisfeld	Benny Bock; Julian Ali; Laven^{[a]}; Ely Rise^{[a]}; Page^{[a]}^{[v]}; Sean Matsukawa^{[v]}	3:24
Total length:				35:00

Notes

- ^{^[p]} signifies a primary and vocal producer.
- ^{^[a]} signifies an additional producer.
- ^{^[v]} signifies a vocal producer.
- "Black&Blue" contains samples of:
  - "Weak for Your Love", written by Alejandro Garcia, Josh Lane, and Sal Samano, as performed by Thee Sacred Souls;
  - "Pimp tha Pen", written and performed by DJ Screw featuring Lil' Keke;
  - "(Don't Worry) If There's a Hell Below We're All Going to Go", written by Curtis Mayfield, Gary Slabo, and Riley Hampton, as performed by Mayfield.
- "Government Cheese" contains a sample of "Blue Suede", originally released on the Hell Can Wait EP (2014).
- "Liars" is an excerpt of a conversation between Nikki Giovanni and James Baldwin, taken from an episode of Soul!.
- "Radio" contains samples of "Request Line", written and performed by Rock Master Scott & the Dynamic Three, and "I've Got My Music", written and performed by Marvin Gaye.
- "Nothing Matters" contains interpolations of "Paranoid", written by performed by Kanye West and "Nothing Even Matters", written and performed by Lauryn Hill featuring D'Angelo.
- "Freeman" contains a sample of "Don't Let Me Down", written by Manuel Salas, as performed by the Antiques.

== Personnel ==
=== Musicians ===
- Vince Staples – vocals (all tracks), vibraphone (track 10)
- LeKen Taylor – keyboards, percussion programming (tracks 1, 3, 8, 10, 11); drums (1, 3, 10); bass, percussion (1); piano (10), synth bass (11)
- Tyler Page – keyboards (tracks 1, 5, 9), programming (4), vibraphone (10)
- Carissa Murray – background vocals (track 1)
- Brazzen – keyboards, programming, sound effects (track 1)
- Rahm Silverglade – keyboards (tracks 2, 7), synthesizer (2); bass, percussion, programming (7)
- Corey Smyth – background vocals (track 2)
- Alex Goose – programming (track 2)
- Teej – guitar, keyboards, percussion (track 4)
- Samuel Ivoko – background vocals (track 5), additional vocals (6)
- Saint Mino – keyboards (tracks 5, 12)
- Baby Rose – additional vocals (track 5)
- María Zardoya – additional vocals (track 5)
- Joe Harrison – bass, guitar (track 5)
- Donald Robertson – speaker (track 6)
- Kiah Victoria – background vocals (track 7)
- Darian Thomas – strings (track 7)
- Cardo – drums, programming (track 9)
- J.LBS – keyboards, programming (track 9)
- Maddy Davis – additional vocals (track 10)
- Alexandra Taylor Diaz – additional vocals (track 11)
- Ivan Hicks – additional vocals (track 11)
- Kilo Kish – additional vocals (track 11)
- Tasia Flores-Woods – additional vocals (track 11)
- Matty Michna – background vocals, bass, guitar (track 12)
- Xavi – drums (track 12)
- Zachary Sekoff – keyboards (track 12)
- Santigold – additional vocals (track 13)
- Benny Bock – bass, keyboards, programming (track 13)
- Julian Ali Rapaport – bass, keyboards, programming (track 13)
- Caleb Laven – keyboards, synthesizer programming (track 13)
- Ely Rise – piano (track 13)

=== Technical ===
- Mike Bozzi – mastering
- Joe Visciano – mixing
- Tyler Page – engineering (tracks 1–6, 8–13), recording arrangement (5, 10, 13)
- Sean Matsukawa – engineering (tracks 5, 10, 13)
- Rahm Silverglade – engineering (track 7)
- J. Rocc – engineering (track 9)
- Caleb Laven – engineering (tracks 9, 10, 13)
- Michael Uzowuru – recording arrangement (track 5)

== Charts ==
Chart performance for Dark Times
Chart (2024)	Peak position
Australian Hip Hop/R&B Albums (ARIA)	31
Belgian Albums (Ultratop Flanders)	133
New Zealand Albums (RMNZ)	37
Portuguese Albums (AFP)	121
Swiss Albums (Schweizer Hitparade)	80
UK Album Downloads (OCC)	82
US Billboard 200	69
US Top R&B/Hip-Hop Albums (Billboard)	22
