= Cutthroat Boyz =

American hip hop group

- Origin: Los Angeles, California, U.S.
- Genres: Hip hop
- Years active: 2012–present
- Label: Cutthroat Records
- Members: Vince Staples; Aston Matthews; Joey Fatts

Cutthroat Boyz is an American hip hop group from California. The trio consists of rappers Vince Staples and Aston Matthews, and rapper-producer Joey Fatts.
