= Vince Staples =

American rapper and actor (born 1993)

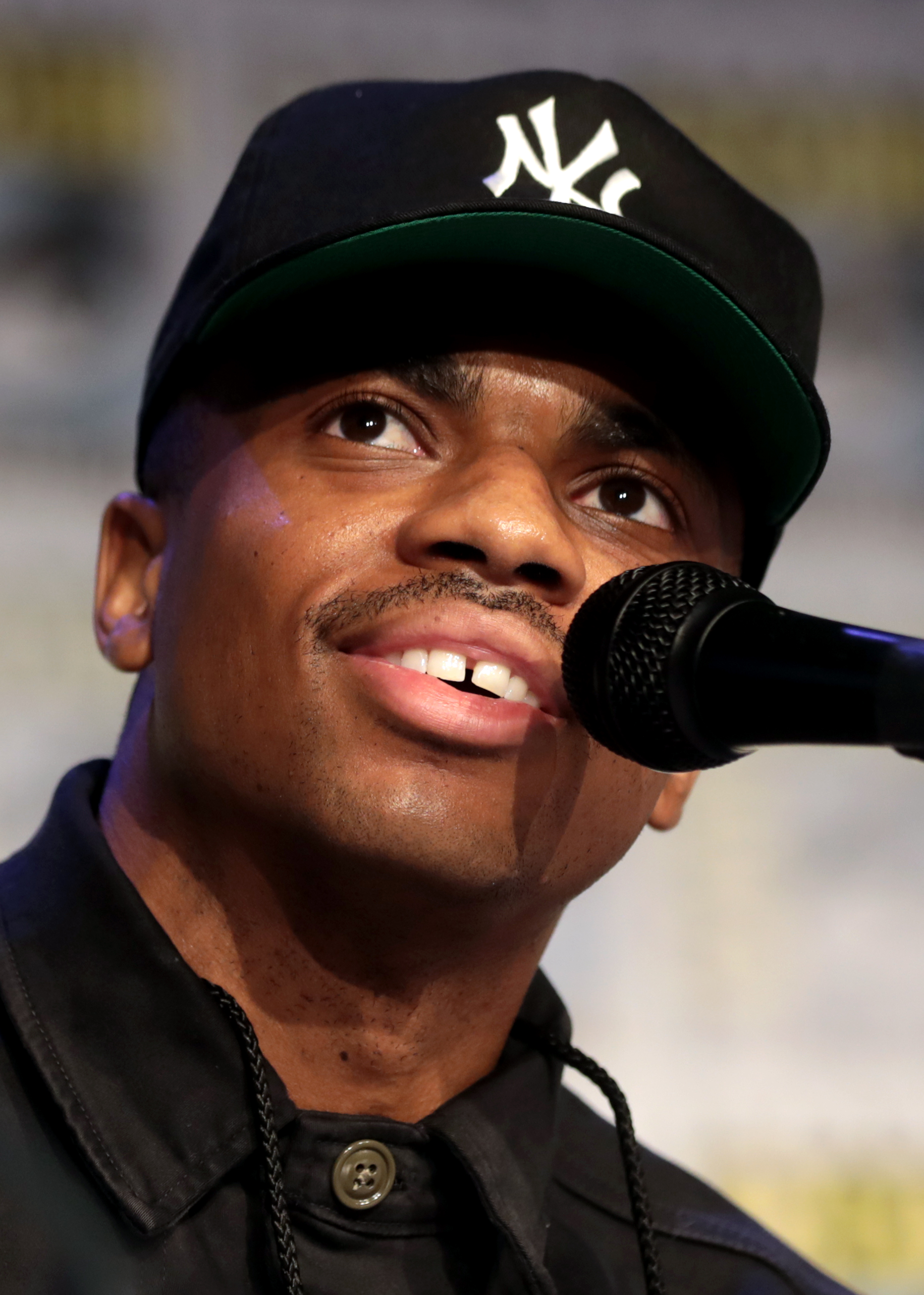
- Staples at the 2021 San Diego Comic-Con

Background information
- Born: Vincent Jamal Staples; July 2, 1993 (age 33); Compton, California, U.S.
- Origin: Long Beach, California, U.S.
- Genre: West Coast hip-hop
- Occupations: Rapper; singer; songwriter; actor
- Works: Vince Staples discography
- Years active: 2008–present
- Labels: Motown; Blacksmith; Def Jam; ARTium; A.G.; Loma Vista; Section Eight Arthouse
- Member of: Cutthroat Boyz
- Website: vincestaples.com

Vincent Jamal Staples (born July 2, 1993) is an American rapper, singer, songwriter, and actor. He first became known for his appearances on the projects from Odd Future members and affiliates, including Earl Sweatshirt's Earl (2010) and Doris (2013), Mike G.’s Ali (2010) and The Jet Age of Tomorrow's Journey to the 5th Echelon (2010). He signed with Talib Kweli's Blacksmith Records prior to the release of his collaborative mixtape with Mac Miller, Stolen Youth (2013). The following year, he signed with No I.D.'s ARTium Recordings, an imprint of Def Jam Recordings, to release his debut extended play, Hell Can Wait (2014), which received critical acclaim and marked his first entry on the Billboard 200.

His debut studio album, Summertime '06 (2015), spawned the single "Norf Norf", which was certified platinum by the Recording Industry Association of America (RIAA). He subsequently released Big Fish Theory (2017), FM! (2018), Vince Staples (2021), and Ramona Park Broke My Heart (2022). His sixth album, Dark Times (2024), marked his final release with Def Jam. In 2026, Staples released his seventh studio album, Cry Baby, his first album as an independent artist and his debut release for Loma Vista Recordings. Staples' music has been described as West Coast hip-hop, often containing conscious subject matter while production experiments with avant-garde, dance and electronic influences.

Outside of his solo career, Staples is a member of the California-based hip-hop trio Cutthroat Boyz with Aston Matthews and Joey Fatts. He has made several film and television appearances as an actor and a voice artist, including Dope (2015), Mutafukaz (2015), American Dad! (2018), Lazor Wulf (2019–2021), Abbott Elementary (2022–23), and White Men Can't Jump (2023). In 2015, he became the spokesperson and brand ambassador for Sprite.

In 2024, Staples created and starred in The Vince Staples Show on Netflix. The series was renewed for a second season, which premiered on November 6, 2025, and was canceled in January 2026 after two seasons.

== Early life and education ==
Staples was born on July 2, 1993 in Compton, California. His grandfather was from Haiti, and his grandmother was from the Dominican Republic. They first arrived in Eastern Canada and then Louisiana, where they assumed they could get "cheaper land." They did not know about the prevalence of slavery in the United States at that time. Staples' maternal grandfather, Andrew Hutchins, was a young boy when he moved to the country and served in the army to support his family. As a "die-hard" Dodgers fan, he later decided to settle in Compton after learning that the city was the birthplace of Duke Snider. Staples' family, including his parents and siblings, "got adopted into" Compton's "gang culture." In a 2016 interview, he said: "There's no better way to put it than: my family came from the streets. My whole family was gang members. I never knew what I wanted to do besides that."

Staples' father was arrested on Christmas when he was in first grade, after which his mother, Eloise Staples, moved the family to his aunt's Compton back-house. The discounted rent allowed her to enroll Staples in the Optimal Christian Academy, a small, black-owned private school on Palmer and Long Beach Boulevard, which he attended from fourth to eighth grade. In school, he was "enamored" by current affairs and politics, winning awards for his writing. He was a "quiet, straight-A student with a photographic memory" and a "skate kid" who played football, baseball and basketball. He participated in Snoop Dogg's Snoop Youth Football League (SYFL), and recalled playing against "grown-ass men" from the Carson Colts and Mission Viejo Cowboys. According to him: "Snoop really did it big, we got our names on our jerseys, we had the best cleats, the best helmets, you know Snoop Dogg really loved football."

Growing up, Staples spent a "significant time" on the Eastside, Long Beach with Hutchins, who was, by then, a retired truck driver and construction worker. In middle school, he started spending more time in Long Beach, California with his elder cousin, Joey Fatts, and joined the 2N Gangsta Crips, a prominent street gang. After graduating from Optimal, Staples attended the majority-white Mayfair High School in Lakewood. As a freshman, he was caught with a stolen phone, and the school authorities used the incident as "a pretext to target a black kid with gang ties" despite multiple witnesses, including the owner of phone, vouching for his innocence. When his mom picked him up, she was shown a file, with Staples' picture on top, that referred to him as an "active gang leader." He was charged with "multiple felonies, including aggravated assault, threatening a witness, and armed robbery." The school and the law enforcement officials agreed to drop all charges if he left Mayfair. Shortly after, his mother sent him to live with one of his sisters in Atlanta for a "cooling-off period." He attended Westlake High School in Fulton County, Georgia for eight months. By the time he returned to Long Beach, his mother had been diagnosed with cancer. Over the next two years, Staples attended several schools including Jordan High School in Long Beach, Esperanza High School in Anaheim, and Kennedy High Schoo. He eventually dropped out and began couch surfing between the homes of his friends and extended family. He briefly lived with his friend's family on Poppy Street, located in the Ramona Park neighborhood of North Long Beach.

== Career ==
=== 2009–2013: Beginnings and Stolen Youth ===
In 2010, Staples befriended musician Dijon Samo, who introduced him to Odd Future's Syd tha Kyd. Although he had been "rapping for fun" until now, the Odd Future studio offered him "a safe space with a couch to crash on." He quickly bonded with Syd, her brother Travis "Taco" Bennet, and Odd Future members Mike G and Earl Sweatshirt. He recorded epaR with Sweatshirt for the latter's mixtape Earl released in March 2010, a song that contributed to Odd Future's "early hype." Both Staples and Sweatshirt disavowed the song later for "its depictions of rape." Staples has also clarified that he wasn't a member, but an affiliate, of Odd Future. Complex named Earl as the 24th-best album of 2010. Shortly after, Sweatshirt abruptly disappeared from the country, having absconded to Samoa at the behest of his mother. By the end of 2011, Odd Future had declined in popularity.

After meeting B. Symth through Om'Mas Keith of Sa-Ra, who encouraged him take music more seriously, Staples released his debut mixtape Shyne Coldchain Vol. 1 on December 30, 2011. In 2012, after Sweatshirt returned from the South Pacific, he introduced Staples to Mac Miller, whose house "emerged as a West Coast rap camp." Miller handed Staples the beats that he had been working on, and eventually produced the latter's 2013 mixtape Stolen Youth. The mixtape featured guest appearances from fellow American rappers Miller (under the alias Larry Fishermen), Ab-Soul, Schoolboy Q, Da$H, Hardo, and Cutthroat Boyz's Joey Fatts. He also toured as a supporting act on Miller's The Space Migration Tour. Around the same time, Smyth helped Staples negotiate a record deal with Def Jam Recordings, allowing him to move away from Poppy Street.

In October 2012, Staples released a collaborative mixtape with Michael Uzowuru, Winter in Prague, which was produced by Uzowuru. In 2013, he featured thrice on Sweatshirt's debut studio album Doris, including the single Hive. He also featured on Sail Out, an album by Jhene Aiko on the first track, The Vapors.

=== 2014–2015: Shyne Coldchain Vol. 2, Hell Can Wait, and Summertime '06 ===
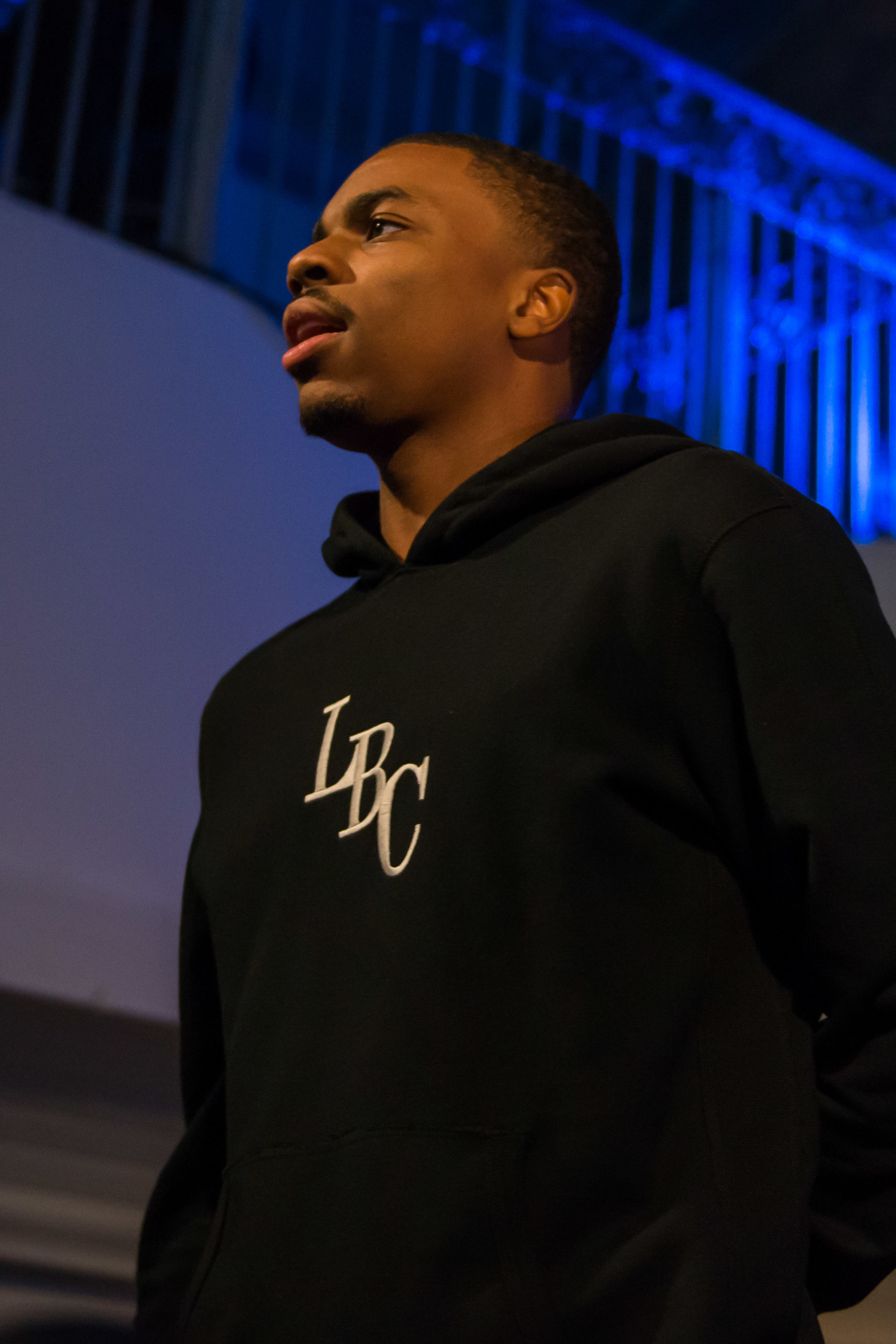
Staples at NXNE in June 2015

On March 13, 2014, Staples released his fourth mixtape called Shyne Coldchain Vol. 2. The mixtape features the production from Earl Sweatshirt, Michael Uzowuru, Childish Major, No ID, Evidence, DJ Babu, and Scoop DeVille; as well as guest appearances from singer-songwriters Jhené Aiko and James Fauntleroy. On March 2, 2014, he joined Schoolboy Q and Isaiah Rashad on the tour to support the release of Schoolboy Q's album Oxymoron.

On August 15, 2014, Staples released Blue Suede on iTunes accompanied by a music video on YouTube. In the next two months, he released Hands Up and the EP Hell Can Wait. The EP was produced by No I.D., Infamous, and Hagler, and included guest appearances from Aston Matthews and Teyana Taylor.

On May 4, 2015, Staples released the first single Señorita from his debut album Summertime '06. On June 15, 2015, he released the second single, Get Paid, featuring Desi Mo. On June 22, 2015, he released the third and final single, Norf Norf. Summertime '06 was released on June 30, 2015 and debuted at number 39 on the US Billboard 200. Jayson Green of Pitchfork rated the album 8.8 on a scale of 10, calling it "breathtakingly focused, a marathon that feels like a sprint." Evan Rytlewski of The A.V. Club said: "[The album] is a major triumph disguised as a minor one—60 minutes of lean, inventive, important rap music that never pats itself on the back for being any of those things."

In September 2015, Staples opened for the East coast tour of ASAP Rocky and Tyler, the Creator. On November 18, 2015, he announced a two-part headlining tour that first ran through December, and then between February and March 2016.

=== 2016–2017: Prima Donna and Big Fish Theory ===
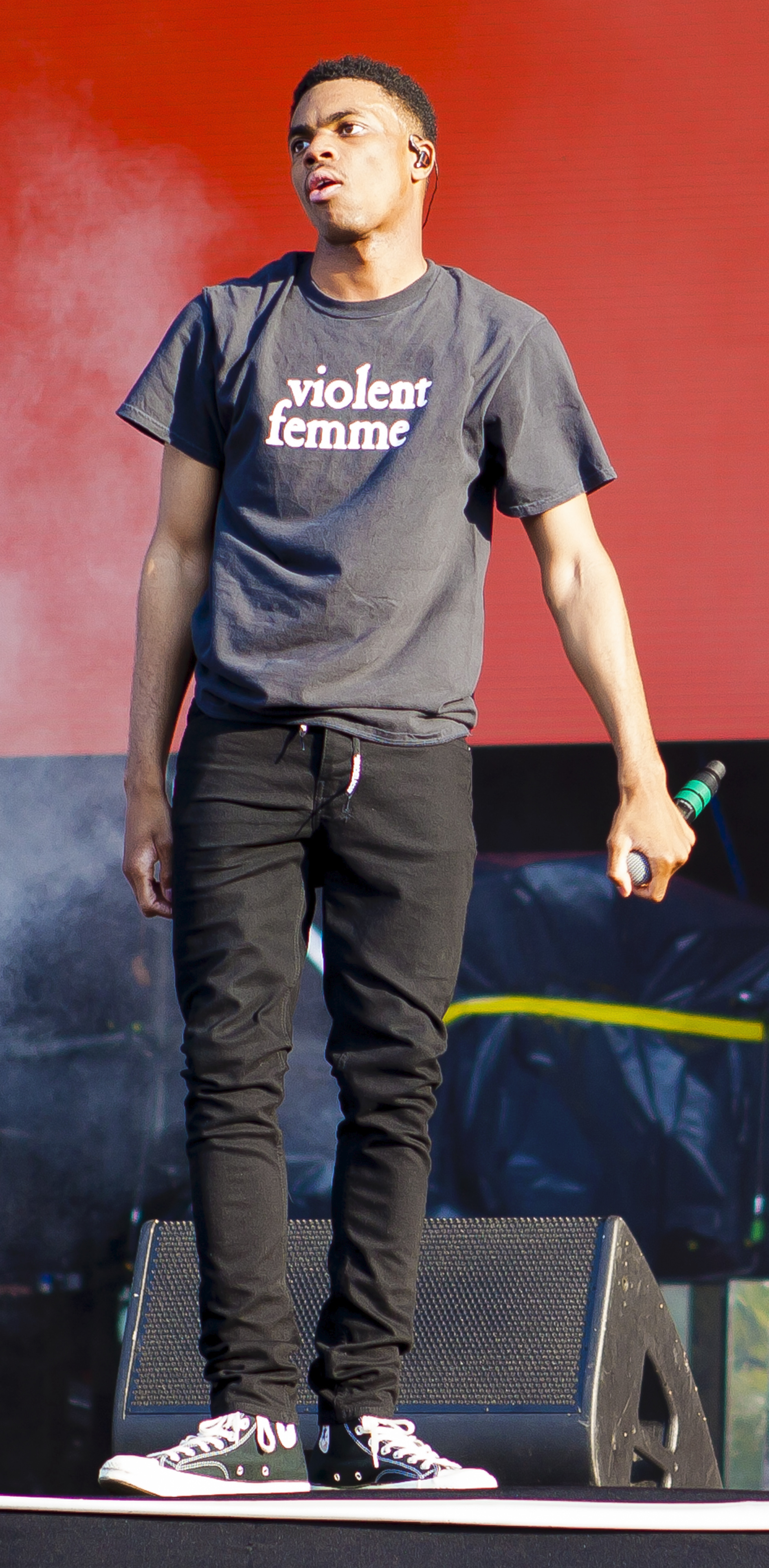
Staples performing in 2017

On February 23, 2016, Staples was announced as part of the line up for the 2016 Osheaga Festival. On August 25, 2016, he released his second EP, the seven-track Prima Donna accompanied by a short film. Later in the year, he joined James Blake on his North American tour.

On February 3, 2017, Staples released "BagBak", the first single from his next studio album. A remix of the song was later featured in the trailer for the Marvel Studios film Black Panther. On March 23, 2017, he was featured on the Gorillaz track "Ascension" from their album Humanz. In an interview on Zane Lowe's show Beats 1, he announced his upcoming album would be called Big Fish Theory and released an accompanying single, "Big Fish", which was followed by the album's third single, "Rain Come Down" on June 8, 2017, featuring Ty Dolla Sign. The album was released on June 23, 2017 and received with widespread critical acclaim.

On November 15, 2017, Staples announced a tour with rapper Tyler, the Creator; they performed together for three months between January and March 2018. He collaborated with composer Hans Zimmer on a remix of the UEFA Champions League Anthem for the FIFA 19 reveal trailer. On December 15, 2017, Staples and Billie Eilish released the single &Burn, which later appeared on the reissue of the Eilish's EP Don't Smile at Me. The song was certified gold in the United States by the Recording Industry Association of America (RIAA) on April 2, 2020.

=== 2018–2021: FM!, and self-titled album ===
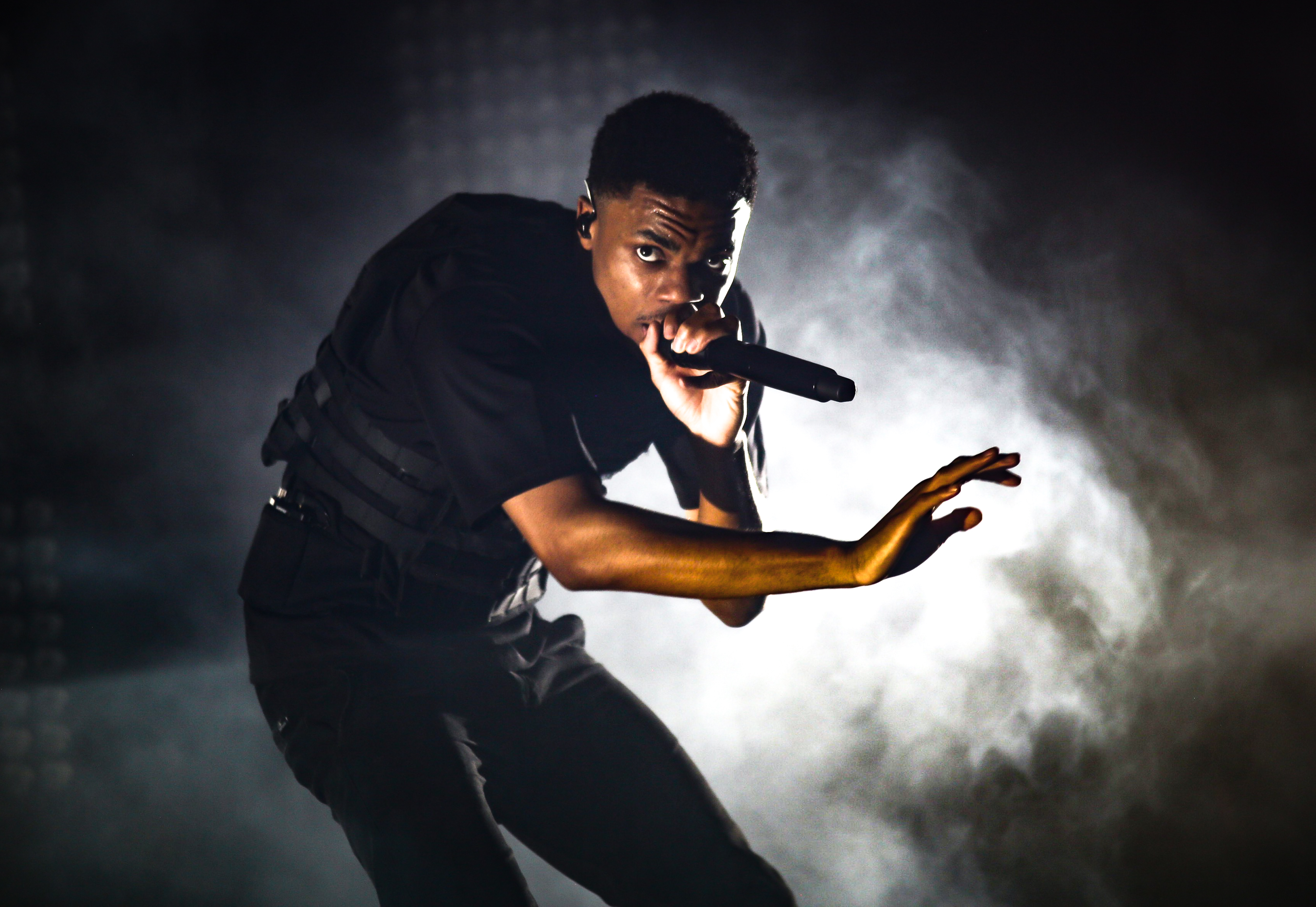
Staples performing in March 2018

In 2018, Staples set up a GoFundMe page titled "Get the Fuck Off My Dick" seeking $2 million as a response to people criticizing his work; they could pay to have him retire early. However, it was briefly taken down given the low response. The money made from the page was subsequently donated to the Michelle Obama Neighborhood Library in Long Beach. On October 2, Staples released his third studio album FM!. Produced primarily by Kenny Beats, the album is framed as a radio station takeover, featuring recurring skits hosted by Los Angeles radio host Big Boy. Additionally, Staples contributed the song "Home" to the Spider-Man: Into the Spider-Verse soundtrack, which was originally previewed in the movie's trailer in December 2017.

In 2019, Staples released three singles: So What?, Sheet Music, and Ad 01: Hell Bound, each accompanied by an episode of his YouTube series The Vince Staples Show.

In April 2021, Staples announced that he was working on a new self-titled album, Vince Staples, that released in July of the same year. Dylan Green of Pitchfork said that the “album’s reserved musical approach magnifies the blunt scene-setting Vince has used to build his name over the last decade” but noted that despite being “uniform in sound,” it is “far from his most exciting music.” In his review for The Guardian, Alexis Petridis gave the album 4 out of 5 stars, calling it “idiosyncratic and really impressive, the sound of someone walking their own path, uncoupled from current trends, shifting and changing as they go.”

=== 2022–2024: Ramona Park Broke My Heart, The Vince Staples Show, and Dark Times ===
On April 8, 2022, Staples released his fifth studio album, Ramona Park Broke My Heart, through Motown Records. The album delves into his relationship with the Long Beach neighborhood, Ramona Park, blending personal narratives with broader social commentary. The album garnered acclaim for its lyrical depth and production quality. Pitchfork's Matthew Ismael Ruiz praised the album for being a "richly detailed, deadpan elegy for [Staples'] stolen youth" that "diverges from the innovation and technical proficiency of earlier records, in favor of introspection and contemplation." He noted that Staples' use of "detail-rich raps" to paint "unvarnished portraits" of growing up in Long Beach has the potential to connect with people around the world "not because those experiences feel shared, but because they feel honest, and worn with pride." In his review for Vulture, music critic Craig Jenkins said: "[The album] is a careful balancing act, a love letter to street life that doesn't slouch on honest discussion of the trouble that can come with gang affiliations, a modern West Coast rap album trying to wrap its arms around three decades of hip-hop history, a Universal Music Group release that feels calculatedly commercial without ever sounding gimmicky or airheaded."

In May 2022, Staples announced the release of Limbo Beach, an original graphic novel that follows a group of young adults who develop unique superpowers after being stranded on an island. The novel was published by Z2 Comics, who approached and introduced Staples to his co-authors—Bryan Edward Hill (Batman and the Outsiders, Titans), Chris Robinson (Children of the Atom), and Buster Moody (Teenage Mutant Ninja Turtles).

Staples had a recurring role on the second season of Quinta Brunson's Abbott Elementary (2021–present). He also starred in White Men Can't Jump (2023), a remake of the 1992 film of the same name, which received mixed reviews. In March 2023, he was featured on Tyler, The Creator's Call Me If You Get Lost: The Estate Sale on the track "Stuntman."

On February 15, 2024, Staples released The Vince Staples Show, a Netflix limited series that James Poniewozik of The New York Times called "an impressionistic alt-comedy built around the deadpan sensibility of its star." He commended the five-episode "hard-to-pin-down show" for being "mordantly funny, visually arresting and an entertaining enigma." The Guardian's Leila Latif praised the "semi-autobiographical sitcom," in which Staples plays a fictionalized version of himself, for being "a wonderfully surreal exercise in Black creativity." She found him to be an "endlessly compelling presence" in a show that delves into "series issues" such as mass incarceration and gun violence. "But these issues," she writes, "only arise as they serve Vince's story, rather than his journey being used as a tool to preach about struggles facing the entire African American community." On May 30, 2024, Staples confirmed that Netflix had renewed the series for a second season. The second season of The Vince Staples Show premiered on November 6, 2025, with six new episodes.

In May 2024, Staples released his album Dark Times, marking his final project with Def Jam. The album was met with critical acclaim. On August 1 2024, he was featured on JPEGMafia's fifth studio album I Lay Down My Life for You on the song "New Black History".

=== 2025-present: Cry Baby ===
On August 8, 2025, Staples was featured on the track "VCRs" on JID's fourth studio album God Does Like Ugly.

On April 25, 2026, Staples released the single "Blackberry Marmalade" accompanied by a music video that he co-directed with Bradley J. Calder. Two days later, he announced that his next album Cry Baby was scheduled to release on June 5, 2026 through Loma Vista Recordings. The second single from the album, "White Flag", was released on May 20, 2026, accompanied by a music video.

Cry Baby was Staples' first album as an independent artist following his departure from Def Jam. The album combines political rap with elements of rock and punk music. He is scheduled to embark on a North American tour in support of the album. Staples played a Tiny Desk Concert in July 2026, performing five songs from the album.

== Personal life ==
Staples lived with his ex-girlfriend in Orange County, California; the couple had an on-and-off relationship since middle school. After their breakup in September 2015, he moved to Downtown Los Angeles.

Staples supports the Los Angeles Clippers. As "an avid fan" of modern art, he referenced the French-American sculptor Louise Bourgeois and postmodern visual satirist Richard Prince in his songs "Rain Come Down" and "Homage".

Staples follows a straight edge lifestyle and does not drink alcohol or take illicit drugs.

=== Religious beliefs and political views ===
Staples has criticized mainstream religious beliefs, saying “religion and God have nothing to do with each other” and, in reference to major religions and the environment, “once you put people in things, things get bad.” On his personal beliefs, he has said: "I believe that people need what they need to survive, but do I think there's a floating man with a blowout? No. Maybe a beaver. Maybe an aardvark. Maybe a body of water."

=== Philanthropy ===
Staples has been outspoken about the dangers of the gang lifestyle. On June 14, 2016, he donated an undisclosed amount to a YMCA program in North Long Beach. Through the program, the youth organization aimed to teach graphic design, 3D printing, product design, music production and filmmaking to 20 eighth and ninth graders at the Hamilton Middle School.

=== Endorsement deals and ventures ===
Since 2015, Staples has appeared in advertisements for Sprite and has promoted the brand on his Twitter. He was part of Alexander Wang's 2016 fall campaign alongside Skrillex, Alice Glass, Tinashe, Mø, Big Sean and Metro Boomin’.

In 2018, he partnered with Converse on a three-piece capsule collection, featuring remakes of two Chuck Taylor silhouettes with graphics from Staples’ album Big Fish Theory (2017). In 2021, Staples starred in a campaign film announcing the collaboration between Beats and Union, a Los Angeles-based streetwear store. "Union has always championed local and Black art, music and fashion, and their L.A. store on La Brea is one of my favorite places to shop,” he explained, "Beats and Union are family, so this campaign felt really authentic to be a part of." In February 2022, he appeared in a video vignette alongside Naomi Osaka to promote Beats’ new Fit Pro earbuds.

In June 2022, Staples was seen in the launch campaign for Acura Integra. He modelled for Calvin Klein’s 2022 spring collection alongside Solange, Burna Boy, and Dominic Fike. He made a guest appearance in the lookbook for Fear of God’s 2024 summer collection.

In 2025, Staples appeared in a series of short films, part of the “Everyone’s a Chuck” campaign, to announce a collaboration between Converse and Coca Cola.

== Discography ==
=== Albums ===
- Summertime '06 (2015)
- Big Fish Theory (2017)
- FM! (2018)
- Vince Staples (2021)
- Ramona Park Broke My Heart (2022)
- Dark Times (2024)
- Cry Baby (2026)

== Concert tours ==
=== Headlining ===
- Hell Can Wait Tour (2014)
- Circa '06 Tour (2015–16)
- The Life Aquatic Tour (2016–17)
- Smile, You're On Camera (2019)
- Black in America Tour (2024)
- Black in Europa Tour (2024)
- Cry Baby Tour (2026-27)

=== Supporting ===
- Mac Miller - Space Migration Tour (2013)
- Schoolboy Q - Oxymoron (Schoolboy Q album) Tour (2014)
- Joey Bada$$ - B4.DA.$$ Tour (2014)
- A$AP Rocky & Tyler, the Creator - Rocky and Tyler Tour (2015)
- Flume - Australian Tour (2016)
- Gorillaz - Humanz Tour (2017)
- Tyler, the Creator - Flower Boy Tour (2018)
- Childish Gambino - This Is America Tour (2018)
- Tyler, the Creator - Call Me If You Get Lost Tour (2022)

== Filmography ==
Film
Year	Film	Role
2015	Dope	Dom's Crew Member 1
2016	Prima Donna (short film)	Himself
2018	MFKZ	Vinz (voice)
2019	Gorillaz: Reject False Icons	Himself
2023	White Men Can't Jump	Speedy
Television
2018	American Dad!	Battle rapper (voice)
2019–2021	Lazor Wulf	Lazor Wulf (voice)
2020	Insecure	Himself
2022–2023	Abbott Elementary	Maurice
2024–2025	The Vince Staples Show	Himself

== Awards and nominations ==
Year	Award	Category	Work	Result
2014	BET Hip Hop Awards	Impact Track	"Kingdom" (with Common)	Won
2016	Black Reel Awards	Best Original or Adapted Song	"Waiting for My Moment" from Creed (with Donald Glover and Jhené Aiko)	Nominated
2016	Berlin Music Video Awards	Best Cinematography	LIFT ME UP	Nominated
2016	Berlin Music Video Awards	Best Concept	SEÑORITA	Nominated
2019	Berlin Music Video Awards	Best Concept	VINCE STAPLES	Nominated
