= Dash (rapper) =

American rapper

Da$H
- Also known as: D.A. Dolla
- Born: Darien Corey Dash, Jr. July 21, 1992 (age 34); Hackensack, New Jersey, U.S.
- Genre: Hip hop
- Occupation: Rapper
- Years active: 2010–present
- Label: H'z Global

Darien Corey Dash, Jr. (born July 21, 1992), known professionally as Dash (stylized as Da$H), is an American rapper. Apart from his solo career, he was a member of Heir Global, alongside former friend and collaborator, Retch. Dash is also an affiliate of ASAP Mob, making his first high-profile appearance on their debut mixtape Lords Never Worry, in 2012. He frequently works with record producer Mordecai Beats, with whom he released the mixtape La Cienega (2012). Da$h has also collaborated with several prominent rappers in the hip-hop industry, including Ab-Soul, Action Bronson, Earl Sweatshirt, Vince Staples, Suicideboys, and Mac Miller.

== Musical career ==
=== 2010–2014: Career beginnings and V.I.C.E.S. ===
Dash began rapping around the age of 16 and subsequently uploaded music on MySpace. Dash first gained recognition in August 2012, when he appeared on three tracks from East Coast hip hop ASAP Mob's debut mixtape, Lord$ Never Worry. Also in 2012, Dash formed the hip hop duo The Heirs (or The H'z for short), which stands for High Everyday Ignoring Rules, with fellow New Jersey–based rapper RetcH. In 2013, Dash released his sixth solo mixtape V.I.C.E.S. (which stands for Very Ignorant Content Exposing Success), to moderate success. The mixtape features guest appearances from Action Bronson, Vince Staples, as well as ASAP Mob members ASAP Nast and ASAP Ferg, among others. The production was handled by Larry Fisherman, Randomblackdude, Thelonious Martin and more. Dash followed up with the release of a two-track extended play (EP) titled, That Time We Smoked Dust (2014), in collaboration with RetcH. In 2014, in an interview with New York music magazine The Fader, former Odd Future member Earl Sweatshirt said that Dash was staying at his apartment in Los Angeles, and that they were working on music together. Earl had previously produced the track "Whalé" from V.I.C.E.S, as well as appearing with him on Mac Miller's track, "New Faces v2".

=== Since 2015: Skrewface and 17 More Minutes ===
In 2015, Da$h released an EP titled Skrewface, followed by a mixtape titled 17 More Minutes. Music videos were released on Da$h's YouTube page for the tracks "RicHie K II," "Hello," and "Seymour," along with a short video series, "DEADMANWALKIN," a documentary-style installation following his experiences on the "Live Now x Die Later" concert tour. In 2017, Da$h released his debut album Loose Skrew, which was released under his independent label H'z Global. He would later go on to release two more albums under H'z Global; 5 Deadly Venoms in 2019 with rapper V Don, and Walk The Plank in 2020.

== Discography ==
=== Studio albums ===
List of albums, with selected details
Title	Album details
Loose Skrew	Released: December 15, 2017; Label: H'z Global; Formats: Digital download
5 Deadly Venoms (Deluxe) (with V Don)	Released: November 19, 2019; Label: H'z Global; Formats: Digital download
Walk The Plank	Released: March 17, 2020; Label: H'z Global; Formats: Digital download
Beta	Released: November 27, 2020; Label: H'z Global; Formats: Digital download
Between the Lines (w/ Sonnyjim)	Released: March 1, 2022; Label: H'z Global/WEBUYGOLD Records; Formats: Digital download
SKREWFACE 2	Released: September 1, 2023; Label: H'z Global; Formats: Digital download

=== EPs ===
List of extended plays, with selected details
Title	Album details
12 12 Twelve (with Sean O'Connell)	Released: December 12, 2012; Label: H'z Global; Formats: Digital download
Double A-Side Vol. 1	Released: October 31, 2013; Label: H'z Global; Formats: Digital download
Double A-Side Vol. 2	Released: January 3, 2014; Label: H'z Global; Formats: Digital download
That Time We Smoked Dust (with RetcH)	Released: May 6, 2014; Label: H'z Global; Formats: Digital download
Double A-Side Vol. 3	Released: June 13, 2014; Label: H'z Global; Formats: Digital download
Skrewface	Released: August 14, 2015; Label: Self-released; Formats: Digital download
Double A-Side Vol. 4	Released: October 24, 2017; Label: H'z Global; Formats: Digital download
Is He Dead Yet?	Released: September 11, 2018; Label: H'z Global; Formats: Digital download
Double A-Side Vol. 5	Released: May 14, 2019; Label: H'z Global; Formats: Digital download
5 Deadly Venoms (with V Don)	Released: July 16, 2019; Label: H'z Global; Formats: Digital download
Double A-Side Vol. 6	Released: September 17, 2019; Label: H'z Global; Formats: Digital download
No Man's Land	Released: December 17, 2019; Label: H'z Global; Formats: Digital download
Too Late 4 Tears (with $auce Heist, Ankhlejohn, and V Don)	Released: August 7, 2020; Label: H'z Global; Formats: Digital download

=== Mixtapes ===
List of mixtapes, with selected details
Title	Album details
The Script to My Instrumental	Released: January 2, 2010; Label: Self-released; Formats: Digital download
Dreamcatcher	Released: August 24, 2010; Label: Self-released; Formats: Digital download
Living What I'm Throwin' Up	Released: March 19, 2011; Label: Self-released; Formats: Digital download
Caveman Files	Released: April 7, 2011; Label: Self-released; Formats: Digital download
ChRon Burgundy	Released: July 23, 2011; Label: Self-released; Formats: Digital download
La Cienega (with RetcH)	Released: September 21, 2012; Label: Self-released; Formats: Digital download
V.I.C.E.S.	Released: June 30, 2013; Label: Self-released; Formats: Digital download
17 More Minutes	Released: September 16, 2015; Label: Self-released; Formats: Digital download

=== Singles ===
==== As lead artist ====
Non-album single, showing year released
Title	Year
"Shaded"	2014
"Now or Never"	2016
"All That There"	2017
"Komplications" (featuring $ha Hef and Man-Z)	2017
"Independence Day"	2017
"ChoppaWalk" (featuring Lil Gnar)	2018

==== As featured artist ====
List of singles, showing year released and album name
Title	Year	Album
"Mine Real" (Bodega Bamz featuring Da$H)	2012	Kid Cannabis (Original Motion Picture Soundtrack)
"Reform School" (Boldy James featuring Earl Sweatshirt, Da$H, and Domo Genesis)	2013	My 1st Chemistry Set
"Swagger Mars" (Rooftop Rep featuring Da$H)	2014	Just to Get a ReP Pt. 1
"Huey Knew" (Ab-Soul featuring Da$H)	2016	Do What Thou Wilt.
"Popped a Gram" (Minty Bruns featuring Da$H)	2016	—N/a

=== Guest appearances ===
List of non-single guest appearances, with other performing artists, showing year released and album name
Title	Year	Other artist(s)	Album
"Firm Shit"	2010	Tenile, Sir Michael Rocks, Boldy James	10illematic/10FDOOM
"Skyscrapers"	2010	Trademark Da Skydiver, Currensy, Young Roddy	Super Villain Issue #3: Reign Supreme
"Necessities"	2010	Trademark Da Skydiver	Super Villain Issue #3: Reign Supreme
"High Score"	2011	Ski Beatz	24 Hour Karate School II
"What a Life"	2011	McKenzie Eddy, GLC	Young Platinum
"Cold Pimpin"	2012	Retch	4LaRaza
"Full Metal Jacket"	2012	ASAP Mob, ASAP Rocky, ASAP Twelvyy, ASAP Ant, ASAP Ferg, ASAP Nast	Lords Never Worry
"Dope, Money, Hoes"	2012	—N/a	Lords Never Worry
"Jay Reed"	2012	ASAP Twelvyy	Lords Never Worry
"Turn Up"	2012	Joey Fatts, Aston Matthews	Chipper Jones
"Very Legendary"	2012	Aston Matthews, Retch	Versace Ragz
"Newport Music"	2012	Retch, Sha Hef	Delinquents & Degenerates
"YungTurnUp"	2012	Retch, Shorty K	Delinquents & Degenerates
"The Wave Matthews Band"	2012	Joey Fatts, ASAP Yams	Chipper Jones Vol. 2
"Venus Moonshine"	2013	Jay Complex	Underdog II: Labour of Love
"The Time Is Now"	2013	Jay Worthy	Move Music
"Money Team"	2013	Tree Jay, DJ Clockwork, Ab-Soul, Smoke DZA	S.H.O.W. Time
"Four 12's"	2013	Chuck Inglish, Retch	Droptops
"Sleep"	2013	Vince Staples, Larry Fisherman, Ab-Soul, Mac Miller	Stolen Youth
"In a Minute"	2013	Sir Michael Rocks, Ab-Soul	While You Wait...
"Blue Fin Tuna"	2013	Retch	Polo Sporting Goods
"Trance"	2013	ASAP Ant	The Big Payback Vol. 1
"The Jesuits"	2013	Delusional Thomas	Delusional Thomas
"Keep a Bitch Broke"	2013	100s, Joey Fatts, Aston Matthews	—N/a
"New Faces v2"	2014	Mac Miller, Earl Sweatshirt	Faces
"Amen Brother"	2014	Larry Fisherman, Ab-Soul, Vince Staples, Retch	non-album single
"Just Have Fun"	2014	Ab-Soul	These Days...
"Grown Ups"	2015	Earl Sweatshirt	I Don't Like Shit, I Don't Go Outside
"Fetti"	2015	Playboi Carti, Maxo Kream	non-album singles
"Suicide"	2015	ASAP Ant, Zombie Juice	non-album singles
"Shrimp & Broccoli "	2015	V Don, Sha Hef	The Opiate
"Jigga 98"	2016	Lucki	Son of Sam
"Questions"	2016	Domo Genesis, Kendra Foster	Genesis
"Perses"	2016	Fat Nick	When the Lean Runs Out
"Uglier"	2016	Suicideboys	Eternal Grey
"Coldest"	2017	V Don, Willie the Kid	Blue Notes
"Change"	2018	Shoreline Mafia, Rob Vicious	Traplantic
"On Mamas"	2018	LNDN DRGS, Left Brain	Brain on DRGS
"Transgression"	2019	Fifthgod, Ab-Soul, Radamiz	The Fifth Tape
"Chaining Day"	2019	Smoke DZA	Prime Location, Vol. 2
"Whitey Bulger"	2020	V Don	Black Mass
"Look Beyond"	2021	Ankhlejohn, Navy Blue, Al.divino	As Above, So Below
