= Delusional Thomas =

Mixtape by Delusional Thomas
- Released: November 1, 2013
- Recorded: 2013
- Genre: Horrorcore
- Length: 27:15
- Label: Self-released
- Producers: Larry Fisherman; randomblackdude

Delusional Thomas chronology
Stolen Youth (2013)	Delusional Thomas (2013)	Live from Space (2013)

Delusional Thomas is a mixtape by American rapper Mac Miller under the alias Delusional Thomas. The mixtape was released as a free digital download on November 1, 2013, via a newly created website delusionalthomas.com.

Delusional Thomas was entirely produced by Miller under his production alias Larry Fisherman. The mixtape features guest appearances from Earl Sweatshirt, Da$H, Bill Waves, and Mac Miller himself.

== Background and themes ==
After the release of Mac Miller's second studio album Watching Movies with the Sound Off, Miller began recording material under a new character named Delusional Thomas. On November 1, 2013, Miller released a previous unannounced mixtape named Delusional Thomas, introducing the new character. The mixtape was produced by Miller under his production alias' Larry Fisherman and features him rapping in a distorted pitched up voice. He explained the voice choice saying, "to me it was a character and I wanted to give his whole own complete, like, everything. There was part of me that wanted to do my own voice, but I just wanted it to be its own complete character. And I feel like that evil voice inside your head is always kind of in that pitch."

His rhymes were described frequently as having horrorcore influences. His lyrics contain "references to extreme violence, constant challenges to Christianity and jokes about offering up younger nephews to Michael Jackson for sex." The mixtape featured guest appearances from Earl Sweatshirt, Mac Miller in his normal voice, ASAP Mob's Da$H and Bill Waves.

Miller's album sound and lyrics were also likely influenced by his heavy drug use. In his song "The Jesuits" Miller talks about "black tar-covered demons". This album came at a time during his career when Miller was heavily involved with drugs.

== Composition and production ==
The first track "Larry" "starts out with slow-pounding keys and the eerie sound of a loon call," setting the backdrop for the psychedelic killing spree the track becomes. Songs like "Halo" feature a piano tinged beat that gives a suspenseful twist, "giving the mixtape a feel that's halfway between Tyler, The Creator's Goblin and Eminem's The Slim Shady LP. "Vertigo" features an instrumental made of gunfire, murky slow-mo sound and horror-core synth. Earl Sweatshirt appears on "Bill", where Bruce Smith of HipHopDX said he stole the show. The instrumental of "72" features a xylophone along subtle drums under Miller's sociopathic rhymes. "The Jesuits" "revels in clever wordplay and outrageous rapper imagery." "Melvin" is a "graphic tale of a conflicted rising star trying to figure out if the material goods and women really afford happiness." On "Grandpa Used to Carry a Flask" Miller raps in his normal voice alongside his alter ego over a somber piano backdrop."

== Critical reception ==
Professional ratings
Review scores
Source	Rating
BET	4/5 stars
HipHopDX	(positive)

Delusional Thomas was met with acclaim from music critics. Jake Rohn of BET stated, "Regardless of who he is in any given moment, Mac Miller is one of the most lyrically gifted MCs in hip hop. He continues to add something new and different. Delusional Thomas' only drawback is that every song has a similar sound, but for the tatted up rhymer's true fans, it won't matter. This mixtape is not for the squeamish and definitely is not for those that only like Top 40 rap. For everyone else, it's hip hop noir at its finest. With only ten short songs, it's just the right amount of time to keep the listener fully engaged."

Bruce Smith of HipHopDX deemed the mixtape "EP-worthy" saying, "Getting past Mac Miller's bouts of immaturity and voice as "Delusional Thomas" is a chore and can be trying. But hidden behind those flaws is a good mixtape." Drew Millard of Vice referred to the mixtape as the best project of Miller's career. Rob Markman of MTV stated, "the real strength in the Delusional Thomas project is showing all the versatility and diversity that Mac has to offer."

== Track listing ==
- All songs were solely produced by Mac Miller under the alias Larry Fisherman except "Bill", also produced by randomblackdude.

No.	Title	Writer(s)	Length
1.	"Larry"	Malcolm McCormick	2:17
2.	"Halo"	McCormick	2:55
3.	"Vertigo"	McCormick	1:10
4.	"Bill" (featuring Earl Sweatshirt and Bill Waves)	McCormick; Thebe Kgositsile; Bill Niels	4:41
5.	"72"	McCormick	2:20
6.	"The Jesuits" (featuring Da$H)	McCormick; Darien Dash	3:15
7.	"Dr. Thomas"	McCormick	2:22
8.	"Labido"	McCormick	2:32
9.	"Melvin"	McCormick	1:30
10.	"Grandpa Used to Carry a Flask" (featuring Mac Miller)	McCormick	4:13
