= Cry Baby (Vince Staples album) =

- Original cover; current cover on streaming platforms has a blue background

Studio album by Vince Staples
- Released: June 5, 2026
- Genres: Political hip-hop; post-punk; rap-rock
- Length: 35:24
- Labels: Section Eight Arthouse; Loma Vista
- Producers: Vince Staples; Banshee the Great; Joseph Harrison; Mike Hector; Oh Gosh Leotus; Saint Mino

Vince Staples chronology
Dark Times (2024)	Cry Baby (2026)

Singles from Cry Baby
- 1. "Blackberry Marmalade" Released: April 25, 2026; 2. "White Flag" Released: May 21, 2026; 3. "Cotton" Released: June 2, 2026

Cry Baby is the seventh studio album by American rapper Vince Staples. It was released on June 5, 2026, through Loma Vista Recordings and his own Section Eight Arthouse label. The album combines political rap with elements of rock and punk music. Similar to his previous album, Dark Times, the album does not feature any appearances from guest artists.

The album was supported by three singles: "Blackberry Marmalade", "White Flag", and "Cotton". The album received widespread acclaim from critics. Staples is set to embark on the Cry Baby Tour in North America in support of the album in October 2026.

== Background and promotion ==
Vince Staples released his sixth studio album, Dark Times, on May 24, 2024, to critical acclaim, and promoted it with the Black in America and Black in Europa tours through the year. Throughout 2024 and 2025, he would appear on songs by JPEGMafia ("New Black History"), Ab-Soul ("California Dream"), Joy Crookes ("Pass the Salt"), and JID ("VCRs"), with his comedy television series The Vince Staples Show also being renewed for a second season before it was later cancelled in January 2026.

Cry Baby's lead single, "Blackberry Marmalade", was released on April 26, 2026, along with a graphic music video depicting a mass shooting. At the beginning of the video, a red hat bearing the album's title could be seen, as well as a date, leading fans to theorize that Staples would be releasing a new album soon. The album was officially announced two days later on April 28, being his first release as an independent artist. "White Flag" was released on May 21 as the album's second single, followed by "Cotton" on June 2.

Staples played a Tiny Desk Concert in July 2026, performing five songs from the album. Staples is scheduled to embark on a North American tour in support of the album. It will begin on October 19, 2026, in Atlanta, and end on November 15, 2026, in San Francisco.

== Music and lyrics ==
The album combines political rap with elements of rock and punk music. Lyrics on the album critique police brutality and racism in the United States.

== Critical reception ==
Professional ratings
Aggregate scores
Source	Rating
AnyDecentMusic?	8.0/10
Metacritic	88/100
Review scores
Source	Rating
AllMusic	4.5/5 stars
Clash	8/10
Consequence	A−
Exclaim!	8/10
The Line of Best Fit	7/10
NME	4/5 stars
Paste	B+
Pitchfork	7.8/10
PopMatters	8/10
The Skinny	5/5 stars

According to the review aggregator Metacritic, Cry Baby received "universal acclaim" based on a weighted average score of 88 out of 100 from 14 critic scores. The review aggregator Any Decent Music gave the album a weighted average score of 8.0 out of 10 from thirteen critic scores.

NME's Fred-Garratt Stanley gave the album four stars rating out of five and wrote, "the album shows a fresh side to Vince Staples, and the prospect of him building on its piercing, riotous political gaze is extremely enticing." Robin Murray of Clash wrote, "a complete 180 from 2024 album Dark Times, Cry Baby is an album that demands patience. Deeply subversive, it's cohesive, potent, and immediate, but underneath all that sit some of Vince Staples' downcast and oblique bars. Refusing to accept easy answers, the West Coast rapper demands a lot of himself, and his audience – for those willing to spend time with it, Cry Baby is a uniquely thrilling experience. PopMatters' John Amen gave the album an 8/10 rating and wrote, "Over 35 adrenalized minutes, Vince Staples comments on the injustices and genocidal tendencies baked into the US's DNA, striking a balance between satire, rant, and keen attunement to the tragic.

== Track listing ==
Cry Baby track listing
No.	Title	Writer(s)	Producer(s)	Length
1.	"Blackberry Marmalade"	Vincent Staples; Mike Hector; Solal Tong Cuong	Hector; Banshee the Great^{[c]}	3:52
2.	"Go! Go! Gorilla"	Staples; Mino Drerup; Kurtis Wells; Zach Fogarty	Saint Mino; Wells^{[c]}; Fogarty^{[c]}	3:31
3.	"White Flag"	Staples; Drerup; Joseph Harrison; Homer Steinweiss	Saint Mino; Harrison^{[c]}	2:34
4.	"The Running Man"	Staples; Drerup; Steinweiss; Paul Casteluzzo	Saint Mino	3:22
5.	"TV Guide"	Staples; Drerup; Harrison; Afolabi Osinulu	Saint Mino; Harrison^{[c]}; Teej^{[c]}	4:24
6.	"The Big Bad Wolf"	Staples; Hector; Noah Ehler; Ryan James Carr; Ricky Walters	Hector; Ehler^{[c]}; Carr^{[c]}	2:12
7.	"Only in America"	Staples; Drerup; Osinulu	Saint Mino; Teej^{[c]}	4:29
8.	"Do You Know the Devil"	Staples; Hector; Adeyinka Bankole-Ojo; Francis Nguyen-Tran	Hector; Fwdslxsh^{[c]}; FrancisGotHeat^{[c]}; Mike Baretz^{[c]}	3:09
9.	"Cotton"	Staples; Hector; Leoren Davis	Hector; Oh Gosh Leotus^{[c]}	3:43
10.	"7 in the Morning"	Staples; Hector; Carr; Baretz	Hector; Carr^{[c]}; Baretz^{[c]}	4:08
Total length:				35:24

Bonus track (vinyl exclusive)
No.	Title	Writer(s)	Producer(s)	Length
11.	"Tulsa, OK"	Staples; Hector; Baretz; Powers Pleasant	Hector; Baretz^{[c]}; Pleasant^{[c]}	3:01

== Personnel ==
Credits were adapted from Tidal.

- Vince Staples – vocals, executive production
- Tyler Page – engineering (all tracks), recording arrangement (tracks 2, 7), bass guitar (2); guitar, keyboards, vocals (7)
- Phillip Hotz – engineering
- Neal H Pogue – mixing
- Zach Acosta – mixing assistance
- Mike Bozzi – mastering
- Brian Malouf – immersive mixing
- Saint Mino – recording arrangement (2, 3, 5, 7), synthesizer (2), keyboards (3–5, 7), percussion (3); background vocals, guitar (4); drums (5, 7)
- Matt Carlson – engineering assistance
- Mass – engineering assistance (1, 2, 5, 9, 10)
- Mos Kosoltrakul – engineering assistance (1, 2, 5, 9, 10)
- Zach Fogarty – bass guitar (2)
- Kurtis Wells – guitar (2)
- Sean Matsukawa – engineering (2)
- Homer Steinweiss – drums (3, 4)
- Joe Harrison – guitar (3, 5), background vocals (3)
- Jeremiah Chew – engineering assistance (3, 7, 9, 10)
- Rian Li – engineering assistance (3, 7, 9, 10)
- Emmy Paalman – engineering assistance (4, 6, 8)
- Teej – keyboards (5, 7), guitar (7)
- Darttny "Dart" Ellis – additional engineering (6)
- JC LeResche – engineering assistance (6)
- Nick Hodges – engineering assistance (6)
- Kellie McGrew – engineering assistance (7, 10)
- Cam Gilfoy – engineering assistance (7)
- Corey Smyth – executive production

== Charts ==
Chart performance
Chart (2026)	Peak position
Australian Albums (ARIA)	37
Belgian Albums (Ultratop Flanders)	91
French Physical Albums (SNEP)	140
French Rock & Metal Albums (SNEP)	11
New Zealand Albums (RMNZ)	38
Scottish Albums (Official Charts)	93
UK Albums Sales (OCC)	51
UK R&B Albums (Official Charts)	2
US Billboard 200	73
US Independent Albums (Billboard)	11
US Top Rap Albums (Billboard)	11
US Top Rock & Alternative Albums (Billboard)	18

== Release history ==
Release dates and formats
Region	Date	Format(s)	Label	Ref.
Various	June 5, 2026	CD; LP; digital download; streaming	Loma Vista	
