= Stolen Youth (mixtape) =

Mixtape by Vince Staples and Larry Fisherman
- Released: June 20, 2013
- Recorded: 2012–2013
- Genre: Hip-hop
- Length: 33:46
- Label: Blacksmith; A.G.
- Producer: Larry Fisherman (also exec.); Vince Staples (exec.)

Vince Staples chronology
Winter in Prague (2012)	Stolen Youth (2013)	Shyne Coldchain II (2014)

Larry Fisherman chronology
Watching Movies with the Sound Off (2013)	Stolen Youth (2013)	Delusional Thomas (2013)

Singles from Stolen Youth
- 1. "Guns & Roses" Released: April 12, 2013

Stolen Youth is a collaborative mixtape by American rapper Vince Staples and rapper/producer Mac Miller, under his production pseudonym Larry Fisherman. The mixtape was released as a free digital download on June 20, 2013, to mixtape hosting websites. Stolen Youth was entirely produced by Miller. The mixtape features guest appearances from Mac Miller, Ab-Soul, Schoolboy Q, Da$H, Hardo, and Staples' Cutthroat Boyz cohort, Joey Fatts.

== Background ==
Vince Staples met Mac Miller through Earl Sweatshirt, after he had returned from Samoa. In December 2012, Mac Miller announced that he would be producing an Extended Play titled, Tales of a Stolen Youth by rapper Vince Staples. Staples stated Miller originally just gave him a few beats, but that grew into them deciding to release a full project together. On March 19, 2013, Staples revealed that Schoolboy Q, Ab-Soul and Joey Fatts would be featured on the project.

On April 12, 2013, the first single "Guns & Roses" was released via The FADER. The song features Staples discussing "sensitive issues as child abuse and gun violence, backed by the choral-sampled" production. On June 6, 2013, Staples revealed the track list to the mixtape. The project title would then be shortened to just Stolen Youth and would be released on June 20, 2013, just two days after Miller's second studio album Watching Movies with the Sound Off as a "free album" or mixtape. The mixtape featured guest appearances from Miller, Ab-Soul, Schoolboy Q, Da$h, Hardo, and Staples' Cutthroat Boyz cohort, Joey Fatts.

Following its release, Staples toured as a supporting act on every date of Mac Miller's The Space Migration Tour. Following the release of Stolen Youth he made three appearances on Earl Sweatshirt's debut studio album Doris, including the single "Hive". The liner notes of the album revealed that Vince Staples had recently signed to Def Jam Recordings. Shortly after the release of Stolen Youth he began working on his fourth mixtape Shyne Coldchain Vol. 2.

On December 5, 2014, Amazon Music combined and reordered the tracks from Stolen Youth and Shyne Coldchain Vol. 2 and released them as an updated version of Stolen Youth (same name and artwork).

== Reception ==
Stolen Youth was met with acclaim from music critics. Jesse Fairfax of HipHopDX labeled it a "free album", their highest praise for a mixtape, saying "A breakout moment for both Vince Staples on the emcee front and Mac Miller behind the boards, Stolen Youth is the product of creative ambition and an organic, refreshing chemistry. Determined to make good on Mac’s charitable efforts, Vince spends the project channeling hopeless pessimism that doesn’t manage to distract from his lyrical gift." XXL called it a "trippy ride through the witty mind of the LA spitter", and praised the "dreamy, textured" production. In a positive review, Elijah Watson of Billboard said, "It's an uncomfortably numb LP: a dispirited Staples reminiscing his past, while ambivalently looking toward his future. [...] Production, handled by Mac Miller as Larry Fisherman, is warm and moody, fitting Staples' bleak outlook well. Black Hippy cohorts Ab-Soul and ScHoolboy Q make appearances, but for the most part Staples is on his own. Stolen Youth is an enjoyably dark listen, with Staples' nightmare-inducing wordplay skillful and engaging."

== Track listing ==
- All tracks are produced by Larry Fisherman

No.	Title	Writer(s)	Length
1.	"Intro"	Vincent Staples; Malcolm McCormick	3:00
2.	"Fantoms" (featuring Joey Fatts)	Staples; McCormick; Joey Vercher	2:33
3.	"Heaven" (featuring Hardo and Mac Miller)	Staples; McCormick; Joseph Barnett	4:24
4.	"Guns & Roses"	Staples; McCormick	3:13
5.	"Back Sellin' Crack" (featuring Schoolboy Q)	Staples; McCormick; Quincy Hanley	4:51
6.	"Stuck In My Ways"	Staples; McCormick	2:23
7.	"Killin' Y'all" (featuring Ab-Soul)	Staples; McCormick; Herbert Stevens IV	2:51
8.	"Thought About You"	Staples; McCormick	3:02
9.	"Sleep" (featuring Dash, Ab-Soul, and Mac Miller)	Staples; McCormick; Darien Dash; Stevens	3:57
10.	"Outro"	Staples; McCormick	3:32
Total length:			33:46

Notes

- "Intro" features additional vocals by Mac Miller as Delusional Thomas
