= Prima Donna (EP) =

EP by Vince Staples
- Released: August 26, 2016
- Recorded: 2015–16
- Genre: Alternative hip-hop
- Length: 21:44
- Label: ARTium; Def Jam
- Producer: James Blake; DJ Dahi; John Hill; No I.D.

Vince Staples chronology
Summertime '06 (2015)	Prima Donna (2016)	Big Fish Theory (2017)

Prima Donna is the second extended play by American rapper Vince Staples. It was released on August 26, 2016, by ARTium Recordings and Def Jam Recordings. The extended play features guest appearances from Kilo Kish and ASAP Rocky, while the production was handled by DJ Dahi, James Blake, John Hill and No I.D.

== Release and promotion ==
On June 20, 2016, Vince Staples revealed on The Fader cover story interview that he would be releasing his six-song EP, called Prima Donna. On August 15, 2016, the release date was announced, along with the release of the cover art and track listing for the album. On September 1, 2016, Staples released a ten-minute short film of the same name directed by Nabil Elderkin.

== Critical reception ==
Professional ratings
Aggregate scores
Source	Rating
AnyDecentMusic?	7.8/10
Metacritic	83/100
Review scores
Source	Rating
AllMusic	4/5 stars
Entertainment Weekly	B+
Exclaim!	8/10
HipHopDX	4.0/5
Pitchfork	8.0/10
Rolling Stone	3.5/5 stars
Slant Magazine	4/5 stars
Spin	8/10
Vice	A−
XXL	4/5

Prima Donna received widespread acclaim from critics. At Metacritic, which assigns a normalized rating out of 100 to reviews from music critics, the album received an average score of 83 based on 11 reviews, indicating “universal acclaim”. Scott Glaysher of XXL stated, "There is no doubt that Vince Staples’ popularity is growing exponentially and putting out projects like this only increases his stock value."

== Track listing ==
No.	Title	Writer(s)	Producer(s)	Length
1.	"Let It Shine"	Vince Staples		0:41
2.	"War Ready"	Staples; James Blake; André Benjamin; Antwan Patton	Blake	2:35
3.	"Smile"	Staples; Dacoury Natche; John Hill	DJ Dahi; Hill	4:20
4.	"Loco" (featuring Kilo Kish)	Staples; Natche; Hill; Lakisha Robinson	DJ Dahi; Hill	4:18
5.	"Prima Donna" (featuring ASAP Rocky)	Staples; Natche; Rakim Mayers	DJ Dahi	3:30
6.	"Pimp Hand"	Staples; Ernest Wilson	No I.D.	2:49
7.	"Big Time"	Staples; Blake	Blake	3:31

Sample credits

- "War Ready" contains samples from "ATLiens" performed by Outkast, and written by André Benjamin and Antwan Patton.

== Charts ==
Chart (2016)	Peak position
Australian Albums (ARIA)	35
New Zealand Heatseekers Albums (RMNZ)	3
US Billboard 200	50
US Top R&B/Hip-Hop Albums (Billboard)	6
