= Norf Norf =

Single by Vince Staples

from the album Summertime '06
- Released: June 22, 2015
- Genre: Hip hop
- Length: 3:03
- Label: ARTium; Def Jam
- Songwriters: Vince Staples; Michael Volpe
- Producer: Clams Casino

Vince Staples singles chronology
"Get Paid" (2015)	"Norf Norf" (2015)	"Smoke & Retribution" (2016)

Music video
- "Norf Norf" on YouTube

"Norf Norf" is a song recorded by American rapper Vince Staples for his debut double studio album, Summertime '06. It was produced by Clams Casino, and released on June 22, 2015 by ARTium Recordings and Def Jam Recordings. It did not peak in any major chart. It received widespread acclaim by critics and was placed on several year-end lists. In March 2023, the song was certified Platinum by the Recording Industry Association of America (RIAA). The song is on the soundtrack of the 2025 video game Tony Hawk’s Pro Skater 3+4.

== Composition ==
"Norf Norf" is a hip hop song. It was described as "sonically grim", built over a "drone-like" section similar to a "monophonic guitar feedback".

== Reception ==
=== Critical reception ===
The song received widespread acclaim by critics. The song was placed in several year-end lists, with Pitchfork placing it at number 19; Complex, at number 46; and The Fader, at number 20. Rob Sheffield of Rolling Stone named it his 12th favorite song of 2015. Paul Schrodt of Complex called it the best Vince Staples song.

=== Controversy ===
The song received criticism from a woman, who heard the song on the radio with her 11-year-old daughter, and released a viral 11-minute video on the internet criticizing the song. In the video, she recited the song's lyrics, called the song "crap" and "filth", and criticized the song's chorus, "I ain't never run from nothing but the police". The video attracted backlash, which led Staples to defend the woman: "No person needs to be attacked for their opinion on what they see to be appropriate for their children"; he also said she was "clearly confused on the context of the song" and "emotionally unstable".

== Music video ==
The song's music video was released on July 17, 2015. It was filmed in black and white, and shows Staples with "an unfazed expression as he's taken on a seemingly routine trip from the back of a cop car", and "gets his mugshot taken, gets roughed up by cops, and gets thrown in a cell".

Eric Ducker of Rolling Stone named it the second best music video of 2015, and USA Today named it the seventh best.

== Certifications ==
Region	Certification	Certified units/sales
New Zealand (RMNZ)	Platinum	30,000^{‡}
United States (RIAA)	Platinum	1,000,000^{‡}
^{‡} Sales+streaming figures based on certification alone.
