= Aston Matthews =

Guatemalan-American rapper (born 1989)

A$ton Matthews
- Also known as: Brick Flair; Chapovelli; The Tan Moses; Mini Van Dan
- Born: Matthew Lopez; October 30, 1989 (age 36); Los Angeles, California, US
- Genre: Hip hop
- Occupation: Rapper
- Instrument: Vocals
- Years active: 2011–present
- Label: Yamborghini
- Member of: Cutthroat Boyz
- Formerly of: Raider Klan
- Website: astonmatthewsmusic.com

Matthew Lopez (born October 30, 1989), known professionally as Aston Matthews (stylized as A$ton Matthews), is a Guatemalan-American rapper from Los Angeles, California. He began to gain recognition in 2014 following the release of his second mixtape, A$ton 3:16. Matthews is also a part of the Los Angeles hip-hop trio Cutthroat Boyz alongside fellow Californian rappers Vince Staples and Joey Fatts.

== Early life ==
Matthew Lopez was born October 30, 1989, in the city of Los Angeles, California. Born of Guatemalan immigrants, Lopez spent much of his formative years between Los Angeles, Hawaiian Gardens, Gardena, and Carson, California. Lopez, a self described multi-sport athlete, played varsity football throughout the duration of his high school career. It is during this time that he became a member of the West Side Pirus, a faction of the Bloods based in Carson, California. On May 31, 2008, Lopez was involved in an altercation at a house party where he was shot in his heart by a .40 caliber bullet, breaking his ribs, and tearing his stomach in the process. After making a full recovery, Lopez began to write and record songs about his life.

== Career ==
=== 2009-11: Career beginnings and NOFVCKSGIVEN ===
Following his recovery Lopez would practice writing, rapping, and recording one song a day for two years before releasing his first solo project. On November 4, 2011, Lopez would release "NOFVCKSGIVEN." Lopez described his approach to the project in an interview with VICE as, "I'm just gonna go in on a bunch of beats, make some random crazy shit and see what the fuck happens." NOFVCKSGIVEN largely narrated the events leading up to Lopez's shooting, as well as describing it from his own point of view on the song "May 31st" which also featured then rising rap artist ScHoolboy Q. When he began to rap himself, Lopez primarily studied the flow and musical patterns of Eminem, also citing Jay-Z, Lil Wayne, G-Unit, and The Diplomats as direct influences to his style.

Prior to recording NOFVCKSGIVEN, Lopez would be introduced to Vince Staples through a mutual friend. Staples and Lopez would go on to collaborate on numerous occasions, ultimately appearing together on Lopez's first project. After the release of NOFVCKSGIVEN Staples would introduce Lopez to A$AP Yams who admired Lopez's unique rap style and wanted to further develop him as an artist.

=== 2011-12: Cutthroat Boyz and Versace Ragz ===
After forming Cutthroat Boyz with rising west coast rap artist Vince Staples and Joey Fatts, Yams would go on to manage Lopez and oversee his next project entitled "Versace Ragz." The title served as an ode to New Orleans rap legend Juvenile's sophomore album Solja Rags. The project furthermore paid tribute as the cover art featured a hand drawn Lopez in the style of early 1990s New Orleans rap album covers made popular by Cash Money Records.

On August 4, 2012, Lopez would release Versace Ragz. The project featured rising New York artists Da$h, RetcH, and Bodega Bamz, as well as Vince Staples. Three weeks later on August 24, 2012, Lopez would premiere his debut music video 'Triple HHH' the video featured both Staples and Fatts, marking the first appearance together on film as Cutthroat Boyz.

On November 6, 2012, Lopez released a remix to the project's lead single "Mini Van Dan" featuring A$AP Nast, Danny Brown, and Flatbush Zombies. A week later on November 12, 2012, Lopez would release an official video to "Hell in a Cell".

Since Versace Ragz release, Lopez has been regarded as being a pioneer in experimental gangster rap as his subject matter reflected a mixture of gang life and the implementation of WWE Wrestling references. Lopez has often referred to himself in song as several monikers in homage to wrestlers including; Brick Flair, his most popular moniker in tribute to Ric Flair, Mini Van Dan, in tribute to Rob Van Dam, Big Poppa Pump, in tribute to Scott Steiner, Eddie Guerrero's Hologram, in tribute to Eddie Guerrero, and Latino Heat, also in tribute to Guerrero.

=== 2013-14: A$ton 3:16 and Touring ===
Following the success of Versace Ragz, Lopez would join A$AP Rocky on the European leg of his Live.Love.A$AP Tour in May 2013. Lopez was then announced to make a feature appearance on A$AP Ferg's debut album Trap Lord before joining his first nationwide tour 'Turnt x Burnt' as a supporting act the following Fall.

On January 16, 2013, Lopez sold out his first show at The Roxy alongside Staples and Fatts, marking the group's first performance and appearance together on stage as The Cutthroat Boyz.

On May 1, 2013, Lopez released an official video to "Mack 11," also announcing he was currently working with legendary hip-hop producers Alchemist and Evidence (of Dilated Peoples).

In June 2013, it was announced Lopez was working on a new project entitled 'A$ton 3:16' which he would describe as a departure from his former projects, "Showcasing [my] rap ability across the board." In an interview with HipHopDX, Lopez described his experience with both producers as,

"I can really rap. I'm young, so I like to have fun with those trap beats and the heavy 808s. When I go to shows, I like to get crazy, and that's just my style. I can really spit though, and that's why I think that I make my best music whenever I'm with Alchemist and Evidence. I love making music with those guys because they challenge me to channel in to a whole different side of my brain that I didn't even know was there."

On October 3, 2013, it was revealed Lopez would appear on the soundtrack of Grand Theft Auto V via the song 'R-Cali' alongside A$AP Rocky.

Two weeks later on October 16, 2013, Lopez released an official video to "Like This" the video quickly became a viral sensation garnering over 500,000 YouTube views upon release.

On December 16, 2013, Lopez released an official video to "Free Wavy Crockett II" an official followup to "Free Wavy Crockett" off his NOFVCKSGIVEN project, both songs and video pay homage to incarcerated New York rap artist Max B whom frequently went by the moniker 'Wavy Crockett'.

On January 29, 2014, Lopez debuted a single off the project entitled 'T.L.C.' which featured Action Bronson, Flatbush Zombies, and A$AP Yams. The song is Lopez's most streamed song on SoundCloud to date, garnering over 1,000,000 streams to date.

On February 10, 2014, Lopez released an official video to "Praey". Two weeks later on February 24, 2014, released an official video to "What You Need" directed by Andy Hines, the video features a cameo by A$AP Rocky.

On February 20, 2014, Yams tweeted a flyer confirming Lopez's appearance at SXSW Music Festival, one month later on March 14, 2014, Yams would post footage of Lopez performing a verse over an early version of A$AP Mob's single "Hella Hoes", to his Tumblr. Lopez would later perform his verse in its entirety alongside the group at SXSW's House of Vans stage sponsored by Vibe Magazine and Vans.

On March 16, 2014, Lopez released A$ton 3:16 via SoundCloud. The title acted as an ode to WWE Wrestler Stone Cold Steve Austin, and featured 19 songs in total. The album's cover art pays homage to Ice Cube's Death Certificate, Lopez has said in interviews his father was an Ice Cube fan and frequently played his albums growing up. Executive produced by both Yams and Chace Infinite, the project featured production by Evidence, Alchemist, Jay Curry and Dj Khalil, as well as guest appearances by Action Bronson, Ab-Soul, Flatbush Zombies, A$AP Ferg, Vince Staples, and Bodega Bamz.

On May 2, 2014 Lopez joined Danny Brown's OLD Tour, making his first appearance at University of California, San Diego.

On July 7, 2014, Lopez released an official video to "Lit". Nearly two months later on August 27, 2014, Lopez released an official video to "The Other Side" featuring Kap G. Both song and videos have been released as non-album promotional singles.

On September 9, 2014, during an interview with XXL Magazine, Vince Staples announced Lopez would be one of two features alongside Teyana Taylor on his upcoming "Hell Can Wait" EP. Lopez would later make a cameo performing an interlude in the music video of Staple's lead single, "Screen Door."

One month later on December 10, 2014, Lopez appeared alongside Young Thug on Noisey's Rap Monument, a 42-Minute song consisting of over 40 rappers including Raekwon, Pusha T, Nipsey Hussle, Danny Brown, and YG among others. Noisey, the music division of Vice Magazine, regarded Lopez as, "West coast gangsta rap's best kept secret."

=== 2015-16: Yams Passing and Hiatus ===
On August 28, 2015, in an interview with XXL Magazine, Lopez revealed that he was with Yams the evening of his passing. Stating he flew to New York to pitch himself for the 2015 XXL Freshman Class, he spent time working with Yams on an unreleased project before ultimately witnessing his passing January 18, 2015. Lopez spoke of his hiatus and the impact of Yams untimely passing as,

"Being thats the homie, being thats the reason people even know who the fuck I am, he built me. And being that he brought me into this shit I was like, I'm straight on this rap shit for a minute. I'm good."

After a hiatus from social media, on April 1, 2015, Lopez released an official video to "Chapo" featuring Vince Staples. The video quickly became Lopez's most watched music video with over 1,000,000 YouTube views to date. Lopez is seen wearing a T-shirt honoring Yams throughout.

On May 2, 2015, Lopez would return to London for the first time in two years to perform, selling out the legendary 100 Club alongside frequent collaborator Da$h. Upon his return to the United States May 30, 2015, Lopez would go on to sell out Los Angeles' Los Globos alongside frequent collaborator Bodega Bamz.

On June 30, 2015, it was revealed Lopez would appear on Vince Staples Summertime '06 album. Lopez was praised by Complex Magazine for his guest appearance as well as being credited the "Best voice in the rap game." Lopez also appears in the music video of the album's lead single "Senorita".

In Lopez's August 28, 2015 interview with XXL Magazine he explained overcoming depression following Yams passing, and announced working with New York producer Velous on his upcoming project entitled "Chapovelli." Lopez described the project's conception as,

Well you know, 'Pac did Makaveli, I'm a big Max B fan and he had the Biggaveli shit. And then my homie put me on to this book, that Machiavelli shit [The Prince] so I started dabbling in that. And everything was connecting to religion, and I was questioning my own faith throughout the year with everything that was going on with Yams and all these other things that was happening in my personal life. So then it just made sense. The wave and then 'Pac, that rough shit, fuse the two, I feel like that's me: the wave and the aggression. And then religion, that's my beliefs, and then questioning it is just my life. So that's why I say it's almost like my offering; in a religious sense it's almost like, "Here, this is what I have, it's all on the line, take my artistry for what it is." 'Cause I'm at a different place; it's not the same rap shit no more. It's aggressive but it's also progression at the same time. It's not the same Aston Matthews no more.

On October 19, 2015, Lopez would perform at The Novo in Los Angeles at Young Thug's Hy!£UN35 Tour. A month later on December 13, 2015, Lopez would join Vince Staples on his Summertime '06 Tour.

On December 21, 2015, in celebration of the life and legacy of Yams, the ASAP Mob announced Lopez would perform at the first annual Yams Day Music Festival at Terminal 5 in New York City on January 18, 2016. Lopez would go on to perform at the second annual Yams Day Music Festival at Madison Square Garden in New York City the following January 18, 2017.

On April 26, 2016, in part of the Wavy Wednesday series, ASAP Mob released a remix version of 'Hella Hoes' featuring Lopez and Danny Brown in addition to the group's original verses on both SoundCloud and YouTube. Lopez performed his verse three years prior at The House of Vans Stage at SXSW alongside the group, as well as on a leaked video version posted by Yams the week of the performance.

On August 22, 2016, Lopez joined OG Maco's nationwide T.L.C. Tour.

On October 18, 2016, Lopez released 'Coldest Night In Hell' Produced by Velous, the song heavily samples Ghostface Killah's 2000 song 'Mighty Healthy' and details the events of '100 Days, 100 Nights' a period of sustained gang warfare in retaliation to the death of a 27-year-old man in Los Angeles in the summer of 2015.

=== 2017-Present: Resurgence and Chapovelli ===
On June 20, 2017, in an Instagram post celebrating the life and legacy of the late rap artist Prodigy of the Queensbridge rap duo Mobb Deep, Lopez revealed they had recorded an unreleased collaboration 'months' prior to his passing. On January 30, 2018, Billboard premiered the posthumous collaboration entitled, '1 Minute To Pray.' In an interview with Billboard, the collaboration is described by Lopez as,

"One of the top 5 moments of my career. I'm forever grateful for what he did for this game, and the influence he gave me, as well as the rest of the world.”

On September 15, 2017, Lopez announced he would be performing for the first time in Seoul, South Korea at The Henz Club. The performance would mark Lopez's first appearance in an Asian territory. A week later, Lopez announced on September 25, 2017, that a collaboration with up-and-coming producer Pi'erre Bourne was in the works. On November 1, 2017, Lopez premiered the collaboration with hip-hop magazine XXL entitled 'BRAZY' reviving talks of his long-awaited album Chapovelli across the internet. Two weeks later, on November 13, 2017, Lopez debuted a music video for 'BRAZY' citing its release in honor of Yams birthday of which fell on the same day. The music video showcases Lopez's travels throughout Seoul, South Korea.

== Personal life ==
On the morning of February 9, 2018, Lopez announced the arrival of his first born son.

Lopez is a known fan of The Oakland Raiders, The Los Angeles Lakers, The Los Angeles Dodgers, and The University of Southern California Trojans, frequently making highly opinionated and candid remarks toward each organization across all social media platforms throughout each team's season.

== Discography ==
=== Studio albums ===
List of studio albums, with selected chart positions
Title	Album details	Peak chart positions		
Title	Album details	US	US R&B/ HH	FRA
Chapovelli	Scheduled: TBA; Label: Yamborghini Records; Format: Digital download	—	—	—

=== Mixtapes ===
List of mixtapes and selected details
Title	Album details
NOFVCKSGIVEN	Released: November 4, 2011; Label: Self-released; Format: Digital download
Versace Ragz	Released: August 9, 2012; Label: Cutthroat Records; Format: Digital download
Aston 3:16	Released: March 16, 2014; Label: Yamborghini; Format: Digital download

=== Singles ===
==== As lead artist ====
List of singles, with selected chart positions and certifications, showing year released and album name
Title	Year	Peak chart positions			Album
Title	Year	US	US R&B	US Rap	Album
"Mini Van Dan"	2013	—	—	—	Versace Ragz
"Hell in a Cell"	2013	—	—	—	Versace Ragz
"Mini Van Dan" (Remix) (featuring Flatbush Zombies and Danny Brown)	2013	—	—	—	Versace Ragz
"Like This"	2014	—	—	—	Aston 3:16
"Chapo" (featuring Vince Staples)	2014	—	—	—	Aston 3:16
"What You Need"	2014	—	—	—	Aston 3:16
"TLC" (featuring Action Bronson and Flatbush Zombies)	2014	—	—	—	Aston 3:16
"TTG" (featuring Ab-Soul)	2014	—	—	—	Aston 3:16
"Lit"	2015	—	— -	-	Non-album singles
"The Other Side" (featuring Kap G)	2015	—	—	-	Non-album singles
"BRAZY"	2017	—	—	—	Chapovelli
"—" denotes a recording that did not chart or was not released in that territory.

=== Guest appearances ===
List of non-single guest appearances, with other performing artists, showing year released and album name
Title	Year	Artist(s)	Album
"Tres Puntos"	2012	Bodega Bamz	Strictly For My P.A.P.I.Z.
"Sweet Chin Symphony"	2012	Retch	Delinquents & Degenerates
"TanGerine"	2013	Chuck Inglish, Kash Flow da God	Droptops
"Everything a Go"	2013	Joey Fatts	Chipper Jones Vol. 2
"Fuck Out My Face"	2013	ASAP Ferg, B-Real, Onyx	Trap Lord
"R-Cali"	2013	ASAP Rocky, Joey Fatts	Grand Theft Auto V Soundtrack
"In My Mind"	2013	Raven Sorvino, Mike G, Maxo Kream	Queen of HeArts
"With My Soul"	2014	The Alchemist, Budgie, Action Bronson, J Rocc	The Good Book
"AWOL Radio Volume Won"	2014	Statik Selektah	AWOL Radio Volume Won
"3:16"	2014	Smoke DZA, 183rd	Ringside 2
"Westside"	2014	Boogie	Thirst 48
"Paradise"	2014	Joey Fatts, Waka Flocka Flame	Chipper Jones Vol. 3
"Screen Door"	2014	Vince Staples	Hell Can Wait
"The Man"	2014	Les	Steak X Shrimp, Vol. 1
"Invoice"	2015	Bodega Bamz	Sidewalk Exec
"Hang N' Bang"	2015	Vince Staples	Summertime '06
"Shark Tank"	2015	Dash, Sha Hef	17 More Minutes
"Chemdream"	2016	Chuck Inglish, Blended Babies	Ev Zeppelin
"Hella Hoes" (Remix)	2016	ASAP Mob, ASAP Rocky, ASAP Ferg, ASAP Nast, ASAP Twelvyy, Danny Brown	—N/a
"Double Tap"	2017	Madchild, Fashawn	The Darkest Hour

== Awards and nominations ==
Year	Nominated work	Award	Result
2016	A$ton Matthews	XXL Freshman	Nominated
2017	A$ton Matthews	XXL Freshman	Nominated
