= Ramona Park Broke My Heart =

Studio album by Vince Staples
- Released: April 8, 2022
- Genre: West Coast hip-hop
- Length: 41:02
- Labels: Motown; Blacksmith
- Producers: Brazzen; Coop the Truth; Dahi; Frano; Johnny Juliano; Jonas; Kenny Beats; LBambino; LeKen Taylor; Mike Hector; Mingo; Mustard; Nami; Paul Castelluzzo; Reske; Saint Mino; Tommy Parker; Yori; Zack Sekoff

Vince Staples chronology
Vince Staples (2021)	Ramona Park Broke My Heart (2022)	Dark Times (2024)

Target exclusive cover

Singles from Ramona Park Broke My Heart
- 1. "Magic" Released: February 14, 2022; 2. "Rose Street" Released: March 28, 2022

Ramona Park Broke My Heart is the fifth studio album by American rapper Vince Staples, released on April 8, 2022, through Motown and Blacksmith Records. It features guest appearances from Mustard, Lil Baby and Ty Dolla Sign. Production was handled by a variety of record producers, including longtime collaborator LeKen Taylor, Saint Mino, Dahi, and Mustard himself, among others. It follows Staples' eponymous fourth studio album (2021), and shares its conversational themes.

== Background and promotion ==
Ramona Park Broke My Heart is named after Ramona Park, the neighborhood of Long Beach, California where Staples grew up. The album's first single, "Magic", was released on February 14, 2022, with an accompanying music video following on March 7. The album's second single, "Rose Street", was released on March 28.

== Critical reception ==
Ramona Park Broke My Heart ratings
Aggregate scores
Source	Rating
AnyDecentMusic?	7.8/10
Metacritic	82/100
Review scores
Source	Rating
AllMusic	4/5 stars
Beats Per Minute	80%
Clash	9/10
DIY	3.5/5 stars
Exclaim!	9/10
Gigwise	9/10
HipHopDX	4.0/5
NME	4/5 stars
Pitchfork	8.0/10
Rolling Stone	3.5/5 stars

Ramona Park Broke My Heart was met with widespread critical acclaim. At Metacritic, which assigns a normalized rating out of 100 to reviews from professional publications, the album received an average score of 82, based on 10 reviews. Aggregator AnyDecentMusic? gave it 7.8 out of 10, based on their assessment of the critical consensus.

Robin Murray from Clash enjoyed the album, saying, "A brave record that asks awkward questions both of its maker and his audience, Ramona Park Broke My Heart is a document of personal evolution and what its possible to bring along with you". Reviewing the album for AllMusic, Fred Thomas stated, "Staples goes even deeper into memory and self-reflection on Ramona Park Broke My Heart, presenting his pain, glory, and contradictory emotions in sharper definition while turning in some of his most engaging music to date". Matthew Ismael Ruiz of Pitchfork said, "The companion piece to his 2021 self-titled record diverges from the innovation and technical proficiency in favor of introspection and contemplation. It is a richly detailed, deadpan elegy for his stolen youth". Beats Per Minute critic Marc Griffin said, "Ramona Park Broke My Heart is an illusion; Vince Staples' latest LP finds him making far more ear-catching music than his previous effort, but the infectious beats and choruses are merely a facade". Wesley McLean of Exclaim! praised the album, stating, "It's a near-perfect encapsulation of every enticing aspect of his previous work, wrapped into one project". Writing for NME, Kyann-Sian Williams stated, "The production is clean, the rhymes imaginative and the rapper digs deeper than ever before. Yes, Vince Staples was a beautifully personal reflection from start to finish, but Ramona Park… deepens the listener's relationship with the rapper".

Karl Blakesley of Gigwise said, "This is easily Vince's strongest and most ambitious work since Big Fish Theory. An album that sounds great, but also offers an intricately crafted and at times brutally honest portrait of his hometown, highlighting the maze of social traps from which he was lucky enough to escape". In a positive review, Spectrum Culture's Aaron Paskin said, "Tragic accounts of violence surround a guarded Vince Staples, who raps not proudly but unapologetically about his dedication to the hustle, his anxiety, and ultimately his inability to love, all stemming from his tumultuous upbringing in Long Beach".

=== Year-end lists ===
Select year-end rankings of Ramona Park Broke My Heart
Critic/publication	List	Rank	Ref.
Clash	Albums of the Year 2022	5	
Complex	The Best Albums of 2022	5	
The Fader	The 50 Best Albums of 2022	37	
Mondo Sonoro	Los 50 mejores discos internacionales de 2022	20	
Okayplayer	Okayplayer's 22 Best Albums of 2022	4	
The Ringer	The 33 Best Albums of 2022	33	
Rolling Stone	The 100 Best Albums of 2022	19	
Rolling Stone	Rob Sheffield's Top 20 Albums of 2022	13	
Vulture	The Best Albums of 2022	2	
Wired	The 12 Best Albums of 2022	2	

== Track listing ==
Ramona Park Broke My Heart track listing
No.	Title	Writer(s)	Producer(s)	Length
1.	"The Beach"	Vincent Staples; Thibault Dominguez	Mingo	1:07
2.	"Aye! (Free the Homies)"	Staples; Sean Matsukawa; Zack Sekoff; LeKen Taylor	Taylor	3:05
3.	"DJ Quik"	Staples; R. Brooks; Luther Cook; John Sims; R. Smith; Earl E. Washington; Dewey Wilson; Dacoury Dahi Natche; Cooper McGill; Dylan Teixeira; David Blake	Dahi; Nami^{[a]}; Coop the Truth^{[a]}	2:20
4.	"Magic" (featuring Mustard)	Staples; Dijon McFarlane; Theodore Life; Dexter Wansel; Lewis Hughes; Jacob Wilkinson-Smith; Nicholas Audino	Mustard; Hughes^{[a]}; My Best Friend Jacob^{[a]}; Unknown Nick^{[a]}	3:46
5.	"Nameless"	Staples; Dylan Wiggins; Grace Alfaro	Brazzen	0:48
6.	"When Sparks Fly"	Staples; Shahrooz Raoofi; Frano Huett; Francesca Bergami; Atupele Ndisale	Frano	3:47
7.	"East Point Prayer" (featuring Lil Baby)	Staples; Dominique Jones; Arthur Ray; Jacob Reske; Kenneth Charles Blume III	Reske; Kenny Beats	3:37
8.	"Slide"	Staples; Hebrew Malachai Richardson; Taylor; Mike Hector; Sekoff	Hector; Sekoff	2:18
9.	"Papercuts"	Staples; Natche; Paul Castelluzzo	Dahi; Castelluzzo	3:01
10.	"Lemonade" (featuring Ty Dolla Sign)	Staples; Tyrone Griffin; Taylor; Yori Smith; Joseph Luis Ramirez III; Dashawn White; Joseph Charles; Justin Garner; Kevin Beggs; Thomas Solis	Taylor; Yori; Beat Gang^{[a]}	2:59
11.	"Player Ways"	Staples; Corinne Bailey Rae; Teixeira; Jonas Koch; Levi Miucci; Mino Drerup	Jonas; LBambino; Saint Mino	3:28
12.	"Mama's Boy"	Staples; McGill; Teixeira	Coop the Truth; Nami	2:19
13.	"Bang That" (featuring Mustard)	Staples; McFarlane; John Julian; Ron LaTour	Johnny Juliano; Mustard; Cardo^{[a]}	2:39
14.	"The Spirit of Monster Kody"	Staples; Drerup; Thomas Lumpkins	Saint Mino; Tommy Parker	0:45
15.	"Rose Street"	Staples; Drerup; Lumpkins	Saint Mino; Parker	2:33
16.	"The Blues"	Staples; Dominguez	Mingo	2:22
Total length:				41:02

Notes

- ^{^[a]} signifies a co-producer
- "When Sparks Fly" contains samples of "No Love", written by Francesca Bergami, and performed by Lyves.
- "The Spirit of Monster Kody" contains an excerpt of an interview with Sanyika Shakur.

== Personnel ==
Credits adapted from liner notes.

Musicians

- Vince Staples – rap vocals
- Sean Matsukawa – additional keyboards, additional vocals, guitar, percussion (2)
- Zack Sekoff – additional keyboards, keyboard arrangements, guitar, percussion (2)
- Mustard – additional vocals (4)
- Nick Lee – horn (4)
- Cory Henry – keyboards (4)
- Dylan Wiggins – additional keyboards (5)
- Reske – additional vocals (7)
- Lil Baby – vocals (7)
- Vision – additional vocals (8)
- Ty Dolla Sign – rap vocals (10)
- Nami – additional keyboards (11)

Technical

- Corey "Blacksmith" Smyth – executive producer
- Ethiopia Habtemariam – executive producer
- Michael Uzowuru – executive producer
- Vince Staples – executive producer
- Chris Gehringer – mastering
- Mark "Spike" Stent – mixing, sound engineering
- Kenny Beats – recording (1, 3, 4, 7, 10, 13, 15, 16)
- Tyler Page – recording (2–6, 8–14)
- Angie Randisi – recording (7)
- Will Quinnell – mastering assistance
- Matt Wolach – mixing assistance, additional engineering
- David Pizzimenti – recording assistance (4)
- Hayden Duncan – recording assistance (4, 6)
- Armin Lopez – recording assistance (8)

== Charts ==
Chart performance for Ramona Park Broke My Heart
Chart (2022)	Peak position
Australian Albums (ARIA)	99
Australian Hip Hop/R&B Albums (ARIA)	30
Belgian Albums (Ultratop Flanders)	193
Canadian Albums (Billboard)	44
US Billboard 200	21
US Top R&B/Hip-Hop Albums (Billboard)	10
