= Shyne Coldchain II =

Mixtape by Vince Staples
- Released: March 13, 2014
- Recorded: 2013
- Genre: Hip-hop
- Length: 29:18
- Label: Blacksmith
- Producer: Childish Major; DJ Babu; Evidence; No I.D.; Scoop DeVille

Vince Staples chronology
Stolen Youth (2013)	Shyne Coldchain II (2014)	Hell Can Wait (2014)

Singles from Shyne Coldchain II
- 1. "Nate" Released: February 19, 2014

Shyne Coldchain II is the fourth official mixtape released by American rapper Vince Staples. The mixtape was produced by No I.D., Evidence, DJ Babu, Childish Major, and Scoop DeVille. It also features guest appearances from singer-songwriters Jhené Aiko, and James Fauntleroy.

== Background ==
Vince Staples began work on the project shortly after the release of his June 2013 collaborative effort with Pittsburgh, Pennsylvania native Mac Miller—Stolen Youth.

In an October 2013 interview, he told Complex:

The next project will be Shyne Coldchain II. I haven't done a solo mixtape since the first one. I'm just trying to go back to crafting a full project, trying to keep it cohesive. There's not really any features on it, just a couple of people on hooks and that's about it. Even with the hooks I wrote most of them, it's just that I got people to help me do parts that I couldn't do myself. The production comes from a lot of the same people I've been working with. Michael Uzowuru has some beats on it. Earl and Childish Major have a beat on it. And then I got some production from some new people. No I.D. gave me a beat. Evidence from Dilated Peoples worked on a lot of beats and helped me get the project together. I want to do the same thing I've been doing on a higher level. If it ain't broke don't fix it. But as I get older, I'm going to mature. The music is going to change over time regardless. I want to put it out before the end of the year. When it's done, we'll put it out.

On February 18, 2014, Staples revealed both the cover artwork and track listing for the mixtape.

On March 20, 2014, A music video was released via YouTube for the song "Nate."

On December 5, 2014 Amazon Music combined and reordered the tracks from Stolen Youth and Shyne Coldchain Vol. 2 and released them as an updated version of Stolen Youth (same name and artwork).

== Critical reception ==
Professional ratings
Review scores
Source	Rating
Exclaim!	7/10
HipHopDX	4/5 stars
XXL	(XL)

Upon its release, Shyne Coldchain II was met with acclaim from music critics. Complex named it the twenty-second best album of the first half of 2014. Writing for them, Dharmic X said, "Producing over half of the project, No I.D. supplied his new signee at Def Jam with a hard, aggressive soundscape that isn't rooted in nostalgia of any sort. But what impresses most here is Vince's lyrical maturity. He proves to be an adept storyteller on songs like "Nate," which describes his dad's drug addiction, and "Earth Science," where he talks about a high-school romance that left an empty place in his heart."

== Track listing ==
- All tracks are written by Vince Staples

No.	Title	Producer(s)	Length
1.	"Progressive 3"	Evidence; DJ Babu	2:18
2.	"Locked & Loaded"	No I.D.	2:27
3.	"Humble"	No I.D.	2:58
4.	"45"	No I.D.	2:26
5.	"Oh You Scared" (featuring Jhené Aiko)	Childish Major	3:54
6.	"Trunk Rattle"	Evidence; DJ Babu	3:25
7.	"Nate" (featuring James Fauntleroy)	Scoop DeVille	3:33
8.	"Turn"	No I.D.	2:46
9.	"Shots"	No I.D.	2:15
10.	"Earth Science"	No I.D.	3:16
