= Summertime '06 =

Studio album by Vince Staples
- Released: June 30, 2015
- Studio: 4220 Feng Shui (Hollywood); Westlake (West Hollywood)
- Genre: Hip-hop
- Length: 59:05
- Label: ARTium; Blacksmith; Def Jam
- Producer: Christian Rich; Clams Casino; DJ Dahi; Mikky Ekko; No I.D.

Vince Staples chronology
Hell Can Wait (2014)	Summertime '06 (2015)	Prima Donna (2016)

Singles from Summertime '06
- 1. "Señorita" Released: May 4, 2015; 2. "Get Paid" Released: June 15, 2015; 3. "Norf Norf" Released: June 22, 2015

Summertime '06 is the debut studio double album by American rapper Vince Staples. It was released on June 30, 2015, through ARTium Recordings, Blacksmith Records, and Def Jam Recordings. The album was primarily produced by No I.D., alongside a variety of high-profile record producers, including DJ Dahi, Clams Casino, Brian Kidd, Christian Rich, and Mikky Ekko. The album was supported by three singles: "Señorita", "Get Paid", and "Norf Norf".

Summertime '06 received widespread acclaim from critics, who praised the album's production and Staples' lyricism. The album debuted at number 39 on the US Billboard 200, selling 13,000 album-equivalent units in its first week.

== Background and promotion ==
On June 7, 2015, Staples released the album's official artwork via Instagram, where he wrote:

Love tore us all apart. Love for self, love for separation, love for the little we all had, love for each other, where we came from… Summer of 2006, the beginning of the end of everything I though [sic] I knew. Youth was stolen from my city that Summer and Im left alone to tell the story. This might not make sense but that's because none of it does, we're stuck. Love tore us all apart. Summertime '06, June 30th.

On June 2, 2015, Staples revealed the track listing for disc one of this double album on his Twitter account, and then for the disc two on June 6, 2015. On June 21, 2015, Summertime '06 was made available for streaming on NPR. On August 24, 2016, the full version of the album's final track "'06" was released on Adult Swim Singles Program 2016.

=== Singles ===
The album's first single, "Señorita", was released on May 4, 2015. The album's second single, "Get Paid", which features a guest appearance from Long Beach-native rapper Desi Mo, was released on June 15, 2015. The album's third and final single, "Norf Norf", was released on June 22, 2015.

== Album artwork ==
The album cover art is based on that of the iconic 1979 album Unknown Pleasures by Joy Division, whom Staples was a fan of growing up.

== Critical reception ==
Summertime '06 ratings
Aggregate scores
Source	Rating
AnyDecentMusic?	8.4/10
Metacritic	87/100
Review scores
Source	Rating
AllMusic	5/5 stars
The A.V. Club	A
Billboard	4/5 stars
The Guardian	4/5 stars
The Irish Times	4/5 stars
Pitchfork	8.8/10
Rolling Stone	3.5/5 stars
Spin	9/10
Vice (Expert Witness)	B+
XXL	4/5

Summertime '06 was met with widespread critical acclaim. At Metacritic, which assigns a normalized rating out of 100 to reviews from mainstream publications, the album received an average score of 87, based on 24 reviews. Aggregator AnyDecentMusic? gave it 8.4 out of 10, based on their assessment of the critical consensus.

David Jeffries of AllMusic said, "Splitting this weighty and rich effort into digestible chunks, the album's physical release comes on two separate discs, making Summertime '06 an artistic triumph wrapped in conceptually fitting package". Evan Rytlewski of The A.V. Club said, "It's a major triumph disguised as a minor one—60 minutes of lean, inventive, important rap music that never pats itself on the back for being any of those things". Alex Gale of Billboard said, "[A] promising, unapologetically dense debut". Adam Kivel of Consequence said, "Former Kanye mentor No I.D., DJ Dahi, and Clams Casino handle production on the album, but they work together with Staples so that the seams between the different dreams, hallucinations, memories, and nightmares don't show". Lanre Bakare of The Guardian said, "In a year of impressive solo rap albums, Staples has managed to create one that's arguably the most idiosyncratic of the lot". Erin Lowers of Exclaim! said, "Summertime '06's coming of age tale is complemented perfectly by production that finds the nuance in Staples' stories and matches it, couching Staples' rhymes in a way that the streets can understand best".

Jay Balfour of HipHopDX said, "No I.D. and company have helped him make music that's both uncomfortable and lived-in, and Staples sounds more himself inside of it than ever before". Colin Fitzgerald of PopMatters said, "Summertime '06 is the kind of coming-of-age story that's common to hip-hop, but Staples delivers his account with a furious passion and refreshing insight". Jayson Greene of Pitchfork said, "Summertime '06 is breathtakingly focused, a marathon that feels like a sprint". M. T. Richards of Spin said, "Virtually every song slaps like crazy". Dan Rys of XXL said, "It is, simply, one of the best rap debuts of the year". Martin Caballero of The Boston Globe said, "Vince Staples goes all-in on his sprawling double-LP commercial debut, and the returns are decent if not world-beating". Christopher R. Weingarten of Rolling Stone said, "It adds up to a hard-hitting 20-track portrait of life and love in a mad city".

=== Rankings ===
Select rankings of Summertime '06
Publication	List	Rank	Ref.
The A.V. Club	The 15 Best Albums of 2015	6	
The Guardian	The Best Albums of 2015	36	
Pitchfork	The 50 Best Albums of 2015	4	
Pitchfork	Readers' Poll Results 2015	9	
Rolling Stone	The 200 Greatest Hip-Hop Albums of All Time	84	
Stereogum	The 50 Best Albums of 2015	4	

== Commercial performance ==
Summertime '06 debuted at number 39 on the US Billboard 200, selling 13,000 album-equivalent units in its first week. It ranked 20th on Billboard's Top Album Sales chart for the week of July 18, 2015.

== Track listing ==
Disc 1: Summertime
No.	Title	Writer(s)	Producer(s)	Length
1.	"Ramona Park Legend, Pt. 1"	Vince Staples; Ernest Wilson	No I.D.	0:36
2.	"Lift Me Up"	Staples; Wilson; Dacoury Natche; Steve Wyreman	DJ Dahi; No I.D.^{[a]}	4:31
3.	"Norf Norf"	Staples; Michael Volpe	Clams Casino	3:03
4.	"Birds & Bees" (featuring Daley)	Staples; Natche; Gareth Daley; Adam Manella; Michael Russell	DJ Dahi	2:41
5.	"Loca"	Staples; Wilson	No I.D.	2:41
6.	"Lemme Know" (featuring Jhené Aiko and DJ Dahi)	Staples; Wilson; Natche; Brian Kidd; Jhené Chilombo	No I.D.; DJ Dahi; Kidd^{[b]}	3:41
7.	"Dopeman" (featuring Joey Fatts and Kilo Kish)	Staples; Wilson; Joey Vercher	No I.D.	1:53
8.	"Jump Off the Roof" (featuring Snoh Aalegra)	Staples; Wilson; Czesław Niemen	No I.D.	3:44
9.	"Señorita"	Staples; Taiwo Hassan; Kehinde Hassan; Sean Fenton; Snoh Nowrozi; Nayvadius Wilburn; Sonny Uwaezuoke	Christian Rich	3:07
10.	"Summertime"	Staples; Volpe; Darwin Jones; Ronnie Smith	Clams Casino	4:19
Total length:				30:16

Disc 2: '06
No.	Title	Writer(s)	Producer(s)	Length
1.	"Ramona Park Legend, Pt. 2"	Staples; Wilson; Thebe Neruda Kgositsile	No I.D.	1:27
2.	"3230"	Staples; Wilson; Wyreman	No I.D.	2:52
3.	"Surf" (featuring Kilo Kish)	Staples; Volpe; Mikky Ekko; Lakisha Robinson	Clams Casino; Ekko	2:31
4.	"Might Be Wrong" (featuring Haneef Talib aka GeNNo and eeeeeeee)	Staples; Wilson; James Fauntleroy; Wyreman	No I.D.	3:59
5.	"Get Paid" (featuring Desi Mo)	Staples; Wilson	No I.D.	3:12
6.	"Street Punks"	Staples; Wilson	No I.D.	3:06
7.	"Hang N' Bang" (featuring Aston Matthews)	Staples; Wilson; Matthew Lopez	No I.D.; Kidd^{[b]}	2:06
8.	"C.N.B."	Staples; Wilson; Natche; Kidd; Kevin Randolph	No I.D.; DJ Dahi; Kidd^{[b]}	4:13
9.	"Like It Is"	Staples; Wilson; Natche; Kidd	No I.D.; DJ Dahi; Kidd^{[b]}	4:36
10.	"'06"	Staples; Wilson	No I.D.	0:47
Total length:				28:49

Notes

- ^{^[a]} signifies a co-producer
- ^{^[b]} signifies an additional producer
- "Loca" features additional vocals by Olga Aguilar and Kilo Kish
- "Señorita" features additional vocals by Snoh Aalegra
- "Ramona Park Legend, Pt. 2" features additional vocals by Earl Sweatshirt
- "C.N.B." features additional vocals by James Fauntleroy

Sample credits

- "Birds & Bees" contains elements from "5ive" (aka "MRR-ADM-Archive-5"), performed by MRR-ADM.
- "Jump Off the Roof" contains elements from "Nie Jesteś Moja", performed by Czesław Niemen.
- "Señorita" contains a sample of "Covered N Money", performed by Future.
- "Summertime" contains elements from "I Hope You'll Be", performed by Darwin's Theory.

== Charts ==
=== Weekly charts ===
Chart performance for Summertime '06
Chart (2015)	Peak position
Belgian Albums (Ultratop Flanders)	180
US Billboard 200	39
US Top R&B/Hip-Hop Albums (Billboard)	3

=== Year-end charts ===
2015 year-end chart performance for Summertime '06
Chart (2015)	Position
US Top R&B/Hip-Hop Albums	88
