= Hell Can Wait =

EP by Vince Staples
- Released: October 7, 2014
- Recorded: 2013–14
- Genre: Hip-hop
- Length: 23:27
- Labels: ARTium; Def Jam
- Producers: Anthony Kilhoffer; Hagler; Infamous; Jordan Lewis; No I.D.

Vince Staples chronology
Shyne Coldchain Vol. 2 (2014)	Hell Can Wait (2014)	Summertime '06 (2015)

Singles from Hell Can Wait
- 1. "Blue Suede" Released: August 15, 2014; 2. "Hands Up" Released: September 9, 2014

Hell Can Wait is the first official EP released by American rapper Vince Staples. It was released on October 7, 2014, and marks his first commercial project, released under Def Jam Recordings.

== Background ==
On August 11, 2014, Staples took to Twitter to announce a new track, "Blue Suede." On August 15, 2014, he released a music video for the song. On September 2, 2014, Staples announced the initial release date for the EP as September 23, although, it was later delayed due to sample clearance issues. On September 9, 2014, Staples released the second single from Hell Can Wait, titled "Hands Up". On September 25, the new, and final release date was revealed to be October 7, 2014. On October 1, Staples posted the official track listing.

== Critical reception ==
Professional ratings
Aggregate scores
Source	Rating
Metacritic	80/100
Review scores
Source	Rating
AllMusic	3.5/5 stars
Exclaim!	8/10
HipHopDX	4.5/5
Paste	8.5/10
Pitchfork	8.5/10
Vice	A−
XXL	4/5

Hell Can Wait received critical acclaim from critics. At Metacritic, which assigns a normalized rating out of 100 to reviews from mainstream publications, the album received an average score of 80, based on eight reviews. Jay Balfour of HipHopDX wrote "At 24 minutes, there's a satisfaction in the shortness of Hell Can Wait, partly because it's so well contained, and partly because it hints at what's next. These songs are worth the attention he's drawing, how he'll sustain it for a full album is worth taking seriously." Craig Jenkins of Pitchfork also wrote favorably of the EP, writing "his production values have finally caught up enough to push him past the scrappy sidekick division into the big leagues." Emmanuel C. M. of XXL wrote, "The growth is unmistakable, with each song and new project, fans see his raw talent getting more finely tuned and concentrated." In a positive review, David Jeffries of AllMusic wrote that although the project is too short for the "full artistic picture", there is no filler and went on to praise "Blue Suede" as the highlight of the EP.

== Track listing ==
All tracks are written by Vince Staples.

No.	Title	Producer(s)	Length
1.	"Fire"	Anthony Kilhoffer	2:16
2.	"65 Hunnid"	Infamous	3:05
3.	"Screen Door" (featuring Aston Matthews)	Hagler	4:07
4.	"Hands Up"	No I.D.	3:19
5.	"Blue Suede"	Hagler	3:38
6.	"Limos" (featuring Teyana Taylor)	Hagler; Jordan Lewis	3:32
7.	"Feelin' the Love"	Hagler	3:30
Total length:			23:27

Notes

- "Screen Door" contains an uncredited sample of "Cell Therapy", written by Rico Wade, Patrick Brown, Ray Murray, Cameron Gipp, Willie Knighton Jr. and Robert Barnett, and performed by Goodie Mob.

== Charts ==
Chart (2014)	Peak position
US Billboard 200	90
US Top R&B/Hip-Hop Albums (Billboard)	15
