= Mac Miller production discography =

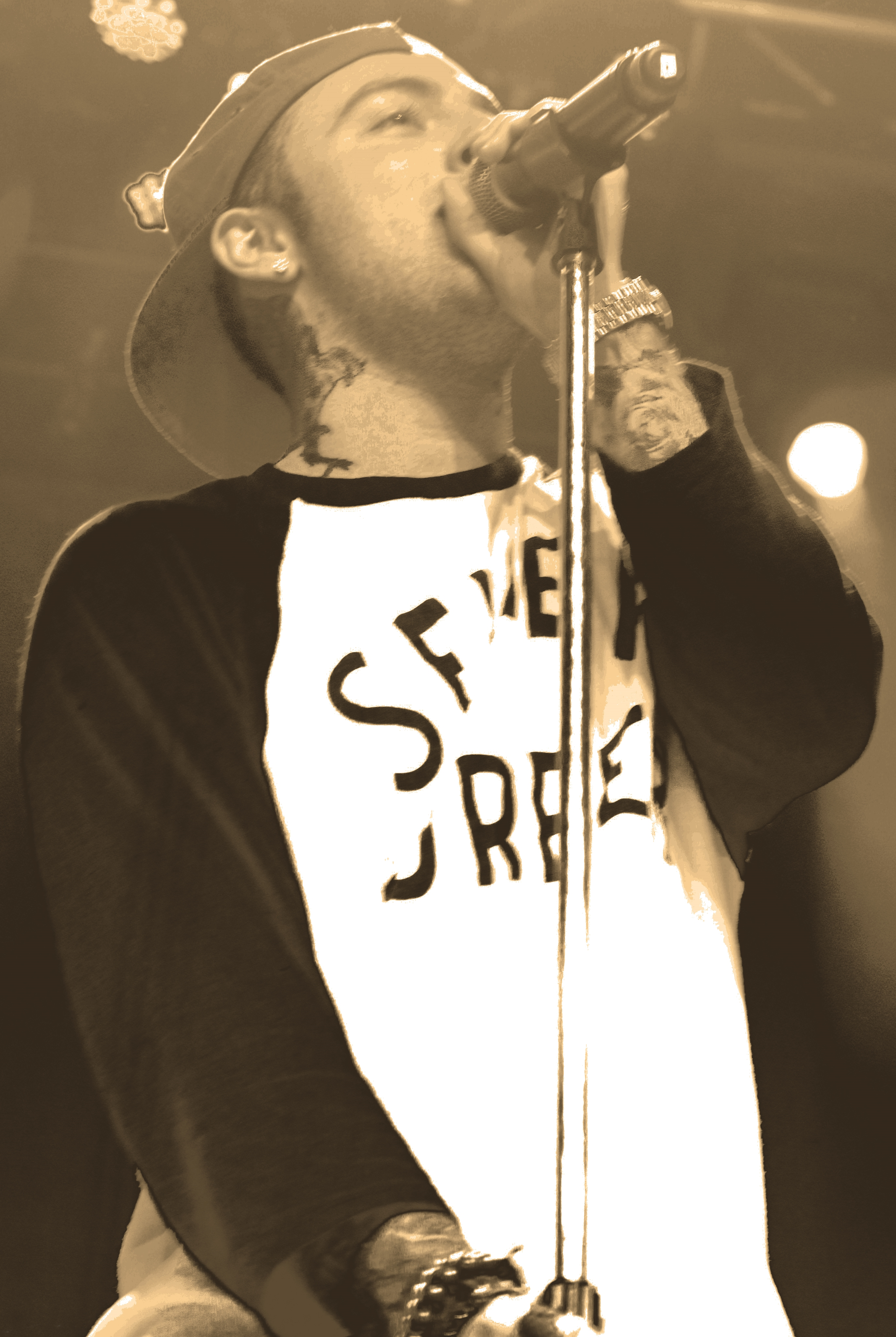
Mac Miller performing in September 2013

The following list is a discography of production by Mac Miller, who was an American rapper from Pittsburgh, Pennsylvania. Miller often produced music under the pseudonym Larry Fisherman.

== 2011 ==
=== Chevy Woods – Red Cup Music ===
- 02. "Fucked Up" (produced with Big Jerm)

=== Mac Miller – I Love Life, Thank You ===
- 10. "Boom Bap Rap" (featuring The Come Up) [produced with Big Jerm]

=== Mac Miller – Blue Slide Park ===
- 10. "Up All Night" (produced with ID Labs)

== 2012 ==
=== Mac Miller ===
- "Day One: A Song About Nothing"
- "PlaneCarBoat" (featuring Schoolboy Q) [produced as Larry Dollaz]
- "No Photos (Posse Cut Pt. 1)" (featuring Most Dope)
- "These Dayz (Dope Awprah)"
- "He Who Ate All the Caviar"
- "Doodling in the Key of C Sharp"

=== Larry Lovestein & The Velvet Revival – You ===
- 01. "Life Can Wait"
- 02. "Love Affair"
- 03. "Suspicions"
- 04. "A Moment 4 Jazz"
- 05. "You"

== 2013 ==
=== Choo Jackson – Beer Flavoured Pizza ===
- 16. "Soul Food"

=== Mac Miller ===
- "Confessions of a Cash Register" (featuring Prodigy) [produced with The Alchemist]

=== Larry Fisherman – Run-On Sentences, Vol. 1 ===
- 01. "Birthday"
- 02. "If Poseidon Had a Surfboard"
- 03. "Novice Space Travel"
- 04. "Gelato Party"
- 05. "I Am Actually a Fish Alien"
- 06. "She Used To Love Me"
- 07. "The Revolution is Coming"
- 08. "Avocado"

=== TreeJay and DJ Clockwork – S.H.O.W. Time ===
- 01. "Rainclouds" (featuring Larry Lovestein & The Velvet Revival)
- 03. "Money Team" (featuring Ab-Soul, Smoke DZA, and Dash)
- 09. "MellowHigh" (featuring Hodgy Beats and Domo Genesis)
- 11. "Boat Races" (featuring Boldy James and Freddie Gibbs)
- 18. "End of the World" (featuring Most Dope)

=== Ab-Soul ===
- "The End is Near" (featuring Mac Miller)

=== Njomza – Gold Lion ===
- 06. "Kangaroo"
- 10. "Tell Me a Lie"

=== Larry Fisherman ===
- "MHB"

=== Sir Michael Rocks – While You Wait... ===
- 07. "In a Minute" (featuring Ab-Soul and Dash)

=== Mac Miller – Watching Movies with the Sound Off ===
- 02. "Avian"
- 11. "Watching Movies" (produced with Sap)
- 12. "Suplexes Inside of Complexes and Duplexes"
- 13. "REMember"
- 15. "Aquarium"

=== Vince Staples and Larry Fisherman – Stolen Youth ===
- 01. "Intro"
- 02. "Fantoms" (featuring Joey Fatts)
- 03. "Heaven" (featuring Hardo and Mac Miller)
- 04. "Guns & Roses"
- 05. "Back Sellin' Crack" (featuring Schoolboy Q)
- 06. "Stuck In My Ways"
- 07. "Killin' Y'all" (featuring Ab-Soul)
- 08. "Thought About You"
- 09. "Sleep" (featuring Dash, Ab-Soul, and Mac Miller)
- 10. "Outro"

=== Dash – V.I.C.E.S ===
- 10. "Aristocratic Anarchy" (featuring Vince Staples)

=== Choo Jackson ===
- "Marbles"

=== Delusional Thomas – Delusional Thomas ===
- 01. "Larry"
- 02. "Halo"
- 03. "Vertigo"
- 04. "Bill" (featuring Earl Sweatshirt and Bill) [produced with randomblackdude as Sweaty Fisherman]
- 05. "72"
- 06. "The Jesuits" (featuring Dash)
- 07. "Dr. Thomas"
- 08. "Labido"
- 09. "Melvin"
- 10. "Grandpa Used to Carry a Flask" (featuring Mac Miller)

=== Fresh a.k.a. Short Dawg – Call Me Fresh ===
- 12. "Bubble Gum Blues" (featuring Ab-Soul)

=== Mac Miller – Live from Space ===
- 12. "Life"
- 13. "Black Bush"

=== Lil B – 05 Fuck Em ===
- 80. "Pixar"

== 2014 ==
=== Mac Miller ===
- "Erica's House" (featuring TreeJay) [produced with ID Labs]
- "Tequila"
- "Amen" (featuring Dash, Ab-Soul, Vince Staples, and Retch)

=== SZA – Z ===
- 01. "Ur"
- 04. "Warm Winds" (featuring Isaiah Rashad) [produced with Antydote]

=== Bill – Vagrant ===
- 05. "Raw Product"
- 06. "Camp Fire" (featuring Mac Miller and Ab-Soul)

=== Mac Miller – Faces ===
- 03. "Friends" (featuring Schoolboy Q)
- 04. "Angel Dust" (produced with Josh Berg)
- 05. "Malibu"
- 06. "What Do You Do" (featuring Sir Michael Rocks)
- 12. "Funeral" (produced with ID Labs)
- 13. "Diablo" (produced with Josh Berg)
- 14. "Ave Maria"
- 15. "55" (produced with Thundercat and Dylan Reynolds)
- 16. "San Francisco"
- 17. "Colors and Shapes" (produced with Thundercat)
- 19. "Uber" (featuring Mike Jones)
- 21. "Apparition" (produced with Josh Berg)
- 22. "Thumbalina" (produced with Josh Berg)
- 24. "Grand Finale"

=== Boaz ===
- "Rapness Monster"

=== Dash – Double A-Side Vol. 3 ===
- 01. "Oblivion"
- 02. "Sloth"

=== Ab-Soul – These Days... ===
- 14. "Ride Slow" (featuring Danny Brown and Delusional Thomas)

=== Riff Raff – Neon Icon ===
- 09. "Aquaberry Dolphin" (featuring Mac Miller)

=== Sir Michael Rocks – Banco ===
- 10. "Lost Boys" (featuring Mac Miller and Trinidad James)

=== Your Old Droog ===
- "Sleepers"

=== DJ Clockwork ===
- "Clocktwerk"

== 2015 ==
=== Mike G – Award Tour II ===
- 02. "James Bond"

=== TreeJay – Baum Blvd ===
- 02. "Days" (featuring Mac Miller)

=== Retch and Mac Miller ===
- "Troubled Man's Lullaby"

=== Njomza and Mac Miller ===
- "Creatures of the Night" (featuring Delusional Thomas) [produced with randomblackdude]

=== Larry Fisherman – Run-On Sentences, Vol. 2 ===
- 01. "Fuckin Shit"
- 02. "jjjoh"
- 03. "Hulu"
- 04. "Yooo"
- 05. "Atom Bomb"
- 06. "Juil"
- 07. "HXH"
- 08. "Here is a Bear"
- 09. "FACEBUSH"
- 10. "Funk Me"
- 11. "Best for Last"
- 12. "Smile"

== 2016 ==
=== Larry Fisherman ===
- "5 Foot Assassin: Larry Fisherman Tribute"
- "¡Go Fish! Volume 1" (featuring Conway)
- "¡Go Fish! Volume 2" (featuring Your Old Droog)
- "¡Go Fish! Volume 3" (featuring Michael Christmas)

=== Smoke DZA – George Kush da Button: Don't Pass Trump the Blunt ===
- 14. "Beloved"

=== Choo Jackson ===
- "O'Shea"

=== Spillage Village ===
- "Laundry Day" (featuring EarthGang and J.I.D)

== 2017 ==
=== DJ Clockwork ===
- "Dance"

== 2018 ==
=== Mac Miller ===
- "Buttons" (produced as Parson Brown)
- "Inertia"

=== Mac Miller – Swimming ===
- 01. "Come Back to Earth" (produced with Jon Brion and Gitty)
- 10. "Dunno" (produced as Parson Brown; with Jon Brion)
- 11. "Jet Fuel" (produced with DJ Dahi and Steve Lacy)
- 13. "So It Goes" (produced with Jon Brion)

=== Bill Waves – For The Lost Children EP ===
- 06. "New Wings"

== 2020 ==
=== Mac Miller – Circles ===
- 01. "Circles" (produced with Jon Brion)
- 02. "Complicated" (produced with Jon Brion)
- 04. "Good News" (produced with Jon Brion)
- 06. "Everybody" (produced with Jon Brion)
- 08. "Hand Me Downs" (produced with Jon Brion)
- 09. "That's on Me" (produced with Jon Brion)
- 10. "Hands" (produced with Jon Brion)
- 11. "Surf" (produced with Jon Brion)
- 12. "Once a Day" (produced with Jon Brion)
- 13. "Right" (produced with Vic Wainstein and E. Dan)
- 14. "Floating" (produced with Jon Brion and Alexander Spit)

== 2023 ==
=== Mac Miller – Watching Movies with the Sound Off (10th Anniversary Edition) ===
- 21. "The Quest"

== 2025 ==
=== Mac Miller – Balloonerism ===
- 01. "Tambourine Dream"
- 02. "DJ's Chord Organ" (featuring SZA)
- 03. "Do You Have a Destination?" (produced with Taylor Graves)
- 04. "5 Dollar Pony Rides" (produced with Jameel Bruner, Ronald Bruner Jr. and Thundercat)
- 06. "Mrs. Deborah Downer" (produced with Thundercat and Taylor Graves)
- 07. "Stoned"
- 08. "Shangri-La" (produced with Taylor Graves)
- 09. "Funny Papers" (produced with Thundercat and Taylor Graves)
- 10. "Excelsior"
- 11. "Transformations" (featuring Delusional Thomas) [produced with Thundercat and Jameel Bruner]
- 12. "Manakins"
- 13. "Rick's Piano" (produced with Thundercat and Dylan Reynolds)
- 14. "Tomorrow Will Never Know"
