= Circles (Mac Miller album) =

Studio album by Mac Miller
- Released: January 17, 2020
- Recorded: 2018
- Studios: Conway, Hollywood, California
- Genres: Hip-hop; funk; emo rap
- Length: 48:44
- Labels: REMember; Warner
- Producers: Alexander Spit; David x Eli; Eric Dan; Guy Lawrence; Jon Brion; Mac Miller; Shea Taylor; Vic Wainstein

Mac Miller chronology
Swimming (2018)	Circles (2020)	Balloonerism (2025)

Singles from Circles
- 1. "Good News" Released: January 9, 2020; 2. "Blue World" Released: February 4, 2020

Circles is the sixth studio album by American rapper Mac Miller, released posthumously on January 17, 2020, through REMember Music and Warner Records. Circles was being worked on by Miller before his death in September 2018 and was created as a companion piece to his fifth studio album, Swimming (2018). Production was completed by Jon Brion.

Circles was supported by two singles: "Good News" and "Blue World". The album received widespread acclaim from critics and debuted at number three on the US Billboard 200, earning 164,000 album-equivalent units during its first week, making it Miller's biggest week for an album.

== Background ==
Swimming, the fifth studio album by American hip-hop artist Mac Miller, was released on August 3, 2018, by REMember Music and Warner Records. Miller intended the album as a cohesive work meant to mark a certain era of his life, a trend that he began on 2016's The Divine Feminine. Inspired by his work on the film score for Eternal Sunshine of the Spotless Mind, Miller hired Jon Brion as a producer for Swimming. Swimming received positive reviews from music critics, with Mosi Reeves of Rolling Stone saying that Miller "has finally abandoned his frat-rap reputation for good".

On September 7, 2018, while preparing to embark on a promotional tour for Swimming, Miller was found dead in his Los Angeles home of a suspected drug overdose. A later toxicology report from the Los Angeles County Coroners Office determined the cause of death to be "mixed drug toxicity" caused by a combination of alcohol, cocaine, and fentanyl. Miller's estate began giving permission for his collaborators to release his remaining music posthumously in June 2019. These first releases were "Time", a collaboration with Free Nationals and Kali Uchis, and "That's Life", an 88-Keys song with vocal features from Miller and Sia.

== Recording and production ==
At the time of his death, Miller was "well into" the recording process of Circles. It was intended to be a companion album to Swimming, with "two different styles complementing each other, completing a circle" and the concept being "swimming in circles". Brion, who worked with Miller on the album, completed production "based on his time and conversations" with Miller. Swimming and Circles were planned to be the first two installments in a trilogy of albums, where the last piece would have been "a pure hip-hop record", as described by Brion.

== Style and composition ==
Critics have described the album as a hip-hop, funk, and emo rap album with elements of soft rock, pop, R&B, lo-fi, indie folk, and synth-pop. Pitchfork said the album was difficult to categorize, having so many different aspects.

The track "Blue World" includes production assistance from Guy Lawrence, one half of UK-based house production duo Disclosure. The track "Everybody" is a cover of American singer-songwriter Arthur Lee's "Everybody's Gotta Live", from his 1972 debut album Vindicator.

== Release and promotion ==
Circles was announced by Miller's family via a note on his Instagram account on January 8, 2020. It was released by Warner Records on January 17, 2020.

The lead single, "Good News", was released on January 9, 2020, alongside an accompanying music video directed by Anthony Gaddis and Eric Tilford. The video features imagery of Miller in an abstract world with colorful animated landscapes. The remaining tracks on the album were also released with music videos of a similar style on January 17, 2020. "Good News" debuted at number 17 on US Billboard Hot 100, surpassing "Self Care" (2018; number 33) as his highest-charting song as lead artist. "Blue World" was sent to US rhythmic contemporary radio on February 4, 2020, as the album's second single.

== Critical reception ==
Circles ratings
Aggregate scores
Source	Rating
AnyDecentMusic?	7.8/10
Metacritic	83/100
Review scores
Source	Rating
AllMusic	3.5/5 stars
Exclaim!	9/10
The Guardian	4/5 stars
HipHopDX	4.0/5
The Independent	5/5 stars
NME	4/5 stars
The Observer	4/5 stars
Pitchfork	7.4/10
Rolling Stone	3.5/5 stars
Sputnikmusic	4.5/5

Circles was met with widespread critical acclaim. At Metacritic, which assigns a normalized rating out of 100 to reviews from professional publications, the album received an average score of 83, based on 14 reviews. Aggregator AnyDecentMusic? gave it 7.8 out of 10, based on their assessment of the critical consensus.

In her review for The Independent, Roisin O'Connor praised the album, writing, "Through the album there's a mesmerising rhythm, a kind of rocking horse motion that spurs you on to the next track. ... On Swimming he was adrift, searching for a lighthouse beam that would bring him back to "a place of comfort". On Circles, it sounds as though – if only for the briefest of moments – he found it". Sputnikmusic critic Rowan5215 said, "Where Circles succeeds, where it becomes a graceful and elegant piece of art rather than an experimental excursion, is in finding the perfect subject matter for its laidback meanderings. Quite simply, these songs are dispatches from a day in the life of Mac Miller". Writing for Exclaim!, A. Harmony stated, "His gruff vocals hold pain and weariness as he reflects on his struggles and challenges. Yet, however difficult it might be to ingest his candour, there is also a maturity about Miller in which to take solace. There's a sense of growth and lessons learned. These are the marks of a life well-lived, however short". David Brake of HipHopDX wrote, "He finds beauty and peace in allowing himself to experience his own emotions. It's an honest, matter-of-fact account of the grey areas of his life and mind. On Circles, Mac shows the unexpected joy that can be found in the darkest of times".

Kitty Empire of The Observer saying "If Swimming felt contemplative, Circles feels even more like a singer-songwriter album than a hip-hop joint – a tendency most likely amplified by Brion's treatments". Will Lavin of NME gave a positive review, stating "It's a high-quality project, but we lost Mac way too soon, and that's hard to accept. So while it's hard to listen to him talking about self-deterioration and how he spends far too much time in his own head, it's a privilege to hear him share his inner most thoughts over a bed of sweeping, inventive sonics. This is the album Mac Miller was born to make". Rachel Aroesti from The Guardian enjoyed the album, saying, "Miller's lyrics possess a plainness that occasionally yields moments of heart-rending simplicity, but frequently wither into triteness and banality. Yet when his words fail him, his voice is able to communicate the pain more effectively".

=== Year-end lists ===
Select year-end rankings of Circles
Publication	List	Rank	Ref.
Billboard	The 50 Best Albums of 2020	16	
Billboard	The 20 Best Rap Albums of 2020	16	
Clash	Clash Albums of the Year 2020	43	
Complex	The Best Albums of 2020	8	
Exclaim!	Exclaim!'s 50 Best Albums of 2020	32	
The Guardian	The 50 Best Albums of 2020	29	
The Independent	The 40 Best Albums of 2020	12	
The Line of Best Fit	The Best Albums of 2020 Ranked	44	
Noisey	The 100 Best Albums of 2020	58	
Uproxx	The Best Albums of 2020	6	
Vulture	The Best Albums of 2020	6	

== Commercial performance ==
In the United States, Circles debuted at number three on the US Billboard 200, behind the debuts of Eminem's Music to Be Murdered By and Halsey's Manic, earning 164,000 album-equivalent units (including 61,000 copies in traditional album sales) during its first week. This became Miller's biggest week for an album and his sixth US top-ten album. Ten tracks from Circles simultaneously charted on the Billboard Hot 100 in its first week, topped by "Good News" at number 18 and "Blue World" at number 38. In its second week, the album dropped to number six on the chart, with 45,000 units. On December 11, 2024, the album was certified platinum by the Recording Industry Association of America (RIAA) for combined sales and album-equivalent units of over one million units in the United States.

Circles reached Miller's highest peaks in Australia at number three on the ARIA Charts, in Canada at number three on the Canadian Albums Chart, and in the United Kingdom at number eight on the UK Albums Chart.

== Track listing ==
Circles track listing
No.	Title	Writer(s)	Producer(s)	Length
1.	"Circles"	Malcolm McCormick	Mac Miller; Jon Brion	2:50
2.	"Complicated"	McCormick; Brion	Miller; Brion	3:52
3.	"Blue World"	McCormick; Guy Lawrence; George Forrest; Robert Wright	Lawrence; Brion^{[a]}	3:29
4.	"Good News"	McCormick; Brion	Miller; Brion	5:42
5.	"I Can See"	McCormick; Robert Taylor	Brion; Shea Taylor	3:40
6.	"Everybody"	Arthur Lee	Miller; Brion	4:16
7.	"Woods"	McCormick; Brion; Eric Dan; David Ruoff; Eli Klughammer	Dan; David x Eli; Brion^{[a]}	4:46
8.	"Hand Me Downs"	McCormick; Baro Sarka; Garrett Stevenson	Miller; Brion	4:58
9.	"That's on Me"	McCormick	Miller; Brion	3:37
10.	"Hands"	McCormick; Brion	Miller; Brion	3:19
11.	"Surf"	McCormick; Brion	Miller; Brion	5:30
12.	"Once a Day"	McCormick	Miller; Brion^{[a]}	2:40
Total length:				48:44

Deluxe edition (bonus tracks)
No.	Title	Writer(s)	Producer(s)	Length
13.	"Right"	McCormick; Jeff Gitelman; Stephen Bruner; Vic Wainstein	Miller; Wainstein; Dan^{[a]}	4:47
14.	"Floating"	McCormick; Brion; Alexander Manzano	Miller; Brion; Alexander Spit	4:14
Total length:				57:46

Notes

- ^{^[a]} signifies an additional producer
- "I Can See" features uncredited vocals by Ariana Grande

Sample credits

- "Blue World" contains a sample of "It's a Blue World", a song written by George Forrest and Robert Wright, as performed by The Four Freshmen.

== Personnel ==
Credits adapted from the album's liner notes.

Musicians

- Mac Miller – lead vocals (all tracks), bass (tracks 6, 13), guitar (track 9)
- Jon Brion – guitar (tracks 1, 2, 4, 8, 9, 11), cymbals (track 1), vibraphone (track 1, 5), synthesizer (tracks 2, 5), keyboards (tracks 4, 5, 7), drums (tracks 6, 8, 9, 11), bass (tracks 7, 9, 11, 12), piano (track 9), Hammond organ (track 10), reed organ (track 10), percussion (tracks 10, 12)
- MonoNeon – bass (track 2)
- Wendy Melvoin – bass (track 4), guitar (tracks 4, 7, 9)
- Matt Chamberlain – drums (tracks 4, 10)
- Shea Taylor – drums, horn, strings, synthesizer (track 5)
- Tony Royster Jr. – drums (track 6)
- Baro Sura – additional vocals, drums (track 8)
- Thundercat – bass (tracks 13, 14)
- Jeff Gitelman – guitar (track 13)
- Vic Wainstein – guitar, synthesizer, drum programming (track 13)
- Carmel Echols – background vocals (track 14)
- Erin Stevenson – background vocals (track 14)
- Samantha Nelson – background vocals (track 14)
- Brandyn Phillips – horn (track 14)
- Fabian Chavez – horn (track 14)
- Lemar Guillary – horn (track 14)

Technical

- Patricia Sullivan – mastering
- Greg Koller – mixing (all tracks), recording (tracks 1, 2, 4–12)
- Vic Wainstein – associate producer (tracks 1–12), recording (tracks 1, 2, 4–7, 9–14)
- Eric Caudieux – recording (tracks 1, 2, 4–7, 9–12, 14)
- Guy Lawrence – recording (track 3)
- Shea Taylor – recording (track 5)
- Josh Berg – recording (track 5)
- Zachary Acosta – recording (track 6)
- Ross Ferraro – recording (track 8)
- Stefan Durandt – recording (track 8)
- Ben Fletcher – recording assistant (tracks 1, 2, 5, 9, 11–14)
- Ben Sedano – recording assistant (tracks 1, 2, 5, 11–14), assistant (track 9)
- John Armstrong – recording assistant (track 1, 2, 5, 9, 11–14)
- Rouble Kapoor – recording assistant (tracks 1, 2, 4–9, 11, 12)

== Charts ==
=== Weekly charts ===
2020 chart performance for Circles
Chart (2020)	Peak position
Australian Albums (ARIA)	3
Austrian Albums (Ö3 Austria)	8
Belgian Albums (Ultratop Flanders)	4
Belgian Albums (Ultratop Wallonia)	37
Canadian Albums (Billboard)	3
Czech Albums (ČNS IFPI)	5
Danish Albums (Hitlisten)	10
Dutch Albums (Album Top 100)	3
Hungarian Albums (MAHASZ)	9
Estonian Albums (Eesti Ekspress)	2
Finnish Albums (Suomen virallinen lista)	13
French Albums (SNEP)	37
German Albums (Offizielle Top 100)	13
Irish Albums (Official Charts)	6
Italian Albums (FIMI)	38
New Zealand Albums (RMNZ)	3
Norwegian Albums (VG-lista)	5
Portuguese Albums (AFP)	17
Scottish Albums (Official Charts)	28
Slovak Albums (ČNS IFPI)	11
Swedish Albums (Sverigetopplistan)	15
Swiss Albums (Schweizer Hitparade)	9
UK Albums (Official Charts)	8
US Billboard 200	3

2025 chart performance for Circles
Chart (2025)	Peak position
Greek Albums (IFPI)	36

=== Year-end charts ===
2020 year-end chart performance for Circles
Chart (2020)	Position
Belgian Albums (Ultratop Flanders)	92
New Zealand Albums (RMNZ)	41
US Billboard 200	64

== Certifications ==
Certifications for Circles
Region	Certification	Certified units/sales
Denmark (IFPI Danmark)	Gold	10,000^{‡}
France (SNEP)	Gold	50,000^{‡}
New Zealand (RMNZ)	Platinum	15,000^{‡}
United Kingdom (BPI)	Gold	100,000^{‡}
United States (RIAA)	Platinum	1,000,000^{‡}
^{‡} Sales+streaming figures based on certification alone.

== Release history ==
Release dates and formats for Circles
Region	Date	Label(s)	Format(s)	Edition	Ref.
Various	January 17, 2020	REMember Music; Warner	Digital download; streaming	Standard	
Various	March 6, 2020	REMember Music; Warner	CD	Deluxe	
Various	March 20, 2020	REMember Music; Warner	Digital download; streaming	Deluxe	
Various	April 17, 2020	REMember Music; Warner	LP	Deluxe	
