= MHB =

MHB, MHb, or mhb can refer to:

== Biology and medicine ==
- Mycorrhiza helper bacteria, a group of bacteria that have a symbiotic relationship with both fungi and plants
- Midbrain−hindbrain boundary, a region in the developing brain that helps separate the midbrain from the hindbrain
- Medial habenula, a brain region in the middle of the habenula
- Mueller-Hinton broth, similar to Mueller-Hinton agar, a growth medium that can be used for the virtual colony count technique

== Companies and organizations ==
=== Companies and corporate divisions ===
- Malaysia Marine and Heavy Engineering, a shipbuilding and engineering company from Malaysia
- MHB Handel AG, a company related to the supermarket chain Meister Verbrauchermarkt in Bavaria state, Germany
- MAS Hotels and Boutiques, a department of Malaysia Airlines, which Malaysian crown prince Tuanku Syed Faizuddin Putra Jamalullail had been exposed to

==== Banks ====
- Mwanga Hakika Bank, a commercial bank based in Tanzania
- Hungarian Credit Bank, a commercial bank based in Hungary
- Münchener Hypothekenbank, a mortgage bank based in Germany
- Mekong Housing Bank, a commercial bank based in Vietnam from 1997 to 2015

=== Other organizations ===
- Maharashtra Housing Board, a housing authority in Maharashtra, India from 1948 to 1977, eventually merging to form the Maharashtra Housing and Area Development Authority
- Ministry of Croatian Veterans, a government agency of Croatia
- Brazilian Homosexual Movement, an activist group and part of the history of transgender people in Brazil
- Mekaal Hasan Band, a rock band from Lahore, Pakistan
- MHB Task Force, a task force to beautify the neighborhood of Mission Hill, Boston, Massachusetts, U.S.
- Matabeleland Hockey Board, which helped revive hockey in Zimbabwe in 2011; see Zimbabwe men's national field hockey team
- Merchant Hotel Belfast

==== Handball clubs ====
- Mérignac Handball, a handball club from Mérignac, France
- Montpellier Handball, a handball club from Montpellier, France

== Other uses ==
- Mahongwe language, a language spoken in Gabon, by ISO 639 code
- Medicare Hospice Benefit, a program offered by Medicaid for palliative care in the U.S.
- "MHB", a 2013 song by American rapper Mac Miller; see Mac Miller production discography
- "MHB's", a 2000 song by hip hop duo Quasimoto,
- Maghrebite, a mineral; see List of mineral symbols
- Monumenta Historica Britannica, an incomplete 1848 book about the history of the British isles
- RNZAF Base Auckland, an air base in Auckland, New Zealand, by IATA code
