= Hurt Feelings (Mac Miller song) =

2018 song by Mac Miller

Song by Mac Miller

from the album Swimming
- Released: August 3, 2018
- Genre: Hip hop
- Length: 4:05
- Label: REMember; Warner
- Songwriter(s): Malcolm McCormickJermaine Cole; Paul Williams; Devonte Hynes; Jon Brion; Roger Nichols; O'Donel Levy
- Producer(s): J. Cole; Dev Hynes; Brion

Music video
- "Hurt Feelings" on YouTube

"Hurt Feelings" is a song by American rapper Mac Miller from his fifth studio album Swimming (2018). It was produced by J. Cole, with additional production from Dev Hynes and Jon Brion. The song contains a sample of "Nigerian Knight" by O'Donel Levy and interpolation of "We've Only Just Begun" by The Carpenters.

== Background ==
Mac Miller made the song in Hawaii, with one of two beats that J. Cole sent him. He brought it back to Los Angeles and began experimenting with it. Jon Brion played on it. Miller tried to add a piano section on the second part of the hook, playing a grand piano, and when he found no success he asked Dev Hynes to try it. Hynes played it in the same manner as Miller and then tried another approach, which they decided to use.

== Composition ==
The song contains synths and backing vocals. It further develops the style of his song "Come Back to Earth" and album The Divine Feminine, consisting of "shimmering instrumentals" and "trippy beats". Mac Miller raps in a "lackadaisical", relaxed manner, but still with a tone of resilience, about his battle with substance abuse and break from social media following his breakup with singer Ariana Grande. He responds to the controversy surrounding him in the months prior to the album's release, especially referencing his driving under the influence and hit and run incident in May 2018 and detailing his mental state at the time. It combines "shimmering instrumentals", similar to those from his album The Divine Feminine, with "trippy beats".

== Critical reception ==
Neil Z. Yeung of AllMusic considered the song a highlight from Swimming. The Independent wrote that on the song, "Miller blends his persona with his extensive knowledge of music to often impressive degrees." A.D. Amorosi of Variety called it "pained, but weirdly cocksure".

== Charts ==
Chart (2018)	Peak position
Canada (Canadian Hot 100)	74
New Zealand Hot Singles (RMNZ)	7
UK Singles (OCC)	99
US Billboard Hot 100	70
US Hot R&B/Hip-Hop Songs (Billboard)	29

== Certifications ==
Region	Certification	Certified units/sales
New Zealand (RMNZ)	Gold	15,000^{‡}
United States (RIAA)	Platinum	1,000,000^{‡}
^{‡} Sales+streaming figures based on certification alone.
