= 2009 (disambiguation) =

2009 was a common year starting on Thursday of the Gregorian calendar.

2009 may also refer to:

- 2009 (number)
- 2009 (album), by Wiz Khalifa and Curren$y, 2019
- "2009" (song), by Mac Miller, 2018
- "2009" (Glee), a 2015 episode of the TV series
