= Balloonerism =

2025 studio album by Mac Miller

Studio album by Mac Miller
- Released: January 17, 2025
- Recorded: 2013–2016
- Studio: The Sanctuary (Los Angeles)
- Genres: Neo soul; experimental hip-hop; jazz rap
- Length: 58:43
- Label: Warner
- Producers: Larry Fisherman; Jameel Bruner; Ronald Bruner Jr.; Taylor Graves; Dylan Reynolds; Thundercat

Mac Miller chronology
Circles (2020)	Balloonerism (2025)

Singles from Balloonerism
- 1. "5 Dollar Pony Rides" Released: January 9, 2025

Balloonerism is the seventh studio album by American rapper Mac Miller, and his second posthumous album following his death in 2018. The album was released by Warner Records on January 17, 2025, under license to Warner Records, exactly five years from the release of his first posthumous album Circles, and features guest appearances by SZA and Miller's alter ego Delusional Thomas. Initially, Balloonerism was constructed between 2013 and 2016, mostly amidst the production of Miller's studio album Watching Movies with the Sound Off (2013) and Faces (2014) but was scrapped in favor of other projects for years.

A neo soul, experimental hip-hop, and jazz-influenced album, Balloonerism showcases Miller's themes and lyrics on drug use, depression, death, and a longing for childhood innocence, in which he uses metaphoric lyrics and vague storytelling throughout the album. The album's style emphasizes a contrast between its bright tone and dark themes, in which the production gradually becomes darker near the album's conclusion. It is described as a transitional project in Miller's career, distancing from his earlier frat rap style and moving towards a more introspective approach with singing. Much of Balloonerism was finished within a week through jam sessions with musician Thundercat's involvement.

After it was scrapped, some of the album's tracks were leaked in 2020 by a Reddit user, which led various Miller fans to construct their versions of Balloonerism. In 2022, Miller's brother Miller McCormick began discussing with recording engineer Josh Berg and mixer E. Dan about the album's commercial release. In November 2024, Balloonerism was announced with a visual trailer screened at Camp Flog Gnaw. In promotion of the album, "5 Dollar Pony Rides" was released as its lead single, and an animated short film based on the album was released on the same day of the album's release.

Balloonerism was met with generally positive reviews from music critics, praising the album for Miller's introspective lyrics, emotional depth, experimental production, and its approach as a posthumous album. Commercially, the album debuted at number three on the US Billboard 200, earning 81,000 album-equivalent units. In addition, the album topped multiple Billboard album charts and peaked at number two on the US Top R&B/Hip-Hop Albums chart. Outside of the US, the album appeared in multiple album charts internationally. Balloonerism later received a nomination for Best Recording Package at the 68th Annual Grammy Awards.

== Background ==
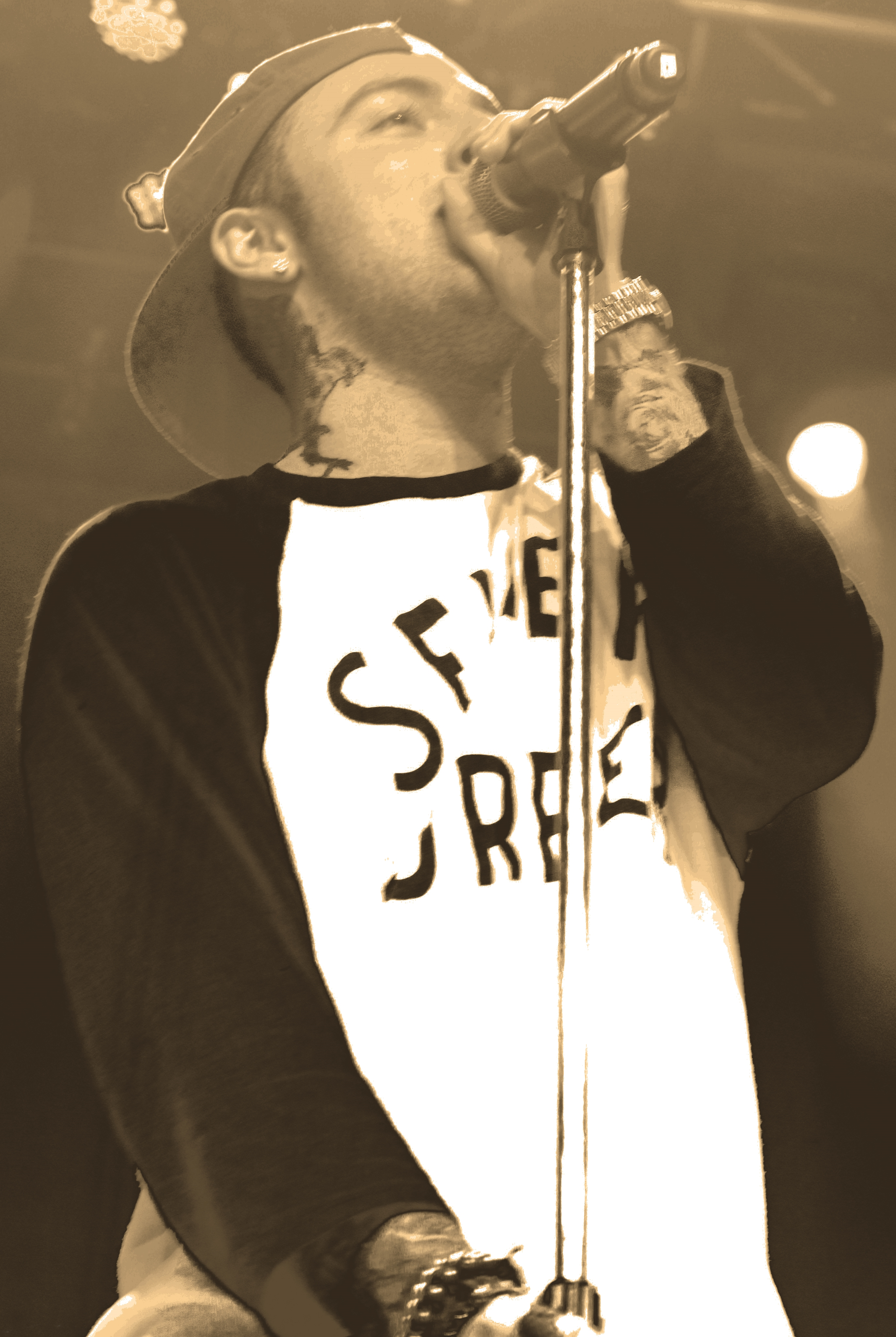
Mac Miller performing in October 2013

In 2012, following the commercial success of his debut studio album Blue Slide Park (2011), Miller moved to Los Angeles. At the time, he had been criticized by hip-hop purists as a "wholesome white frat-rapper", and had done more than 250 shows from the age of eighteen to twenty-one. He decided to move to Los Angeles following a personal fondness for the city while shooting an episode of Punk'd. His residence in Studio City was later noted as a music studio for up-and-coming rappers at the time, including Schoolboy Q, Ab-Soul, Tyler, the Creator, Vince Staples, and Earl Sweatshirt.

After shooting two seasons of his MTV reality series Mac Miller and the Most Dope Family and leaving his contrast with Rostrum Records, Miller found himself in a reflective state according to record engineer Josh Berg. On June 18, 2013, Miller released his second studio album Watching Movies with the Sound Off, marking a drastic shift from his frat rap days. He remained productive during the whole year, releasing Stolen Youth, a collaborative mixtape with Vince Staples; Delusional Thomas, a horrorcore mixtape based on his alter ego of the same name; and Live from Space, a live album from his tour.

In 2014, Miller released the mixtape Faces, recorded not long after Balloonerism's initial sessions, and was critically acclaimed for its themes of psychosis, addiction, and mortality, similar to the latter. Following the initial scrapping of the album, Miller added more singing elements to his work on The Divine Feminine (2016), continuing the approach on Swimming (2018) and the posthumous album Circles (2020). In September 2018, Miller died of an accidental drug overdose at the age of 26, leaving behind various unreleased projects including Balloonerism.

== Production ==
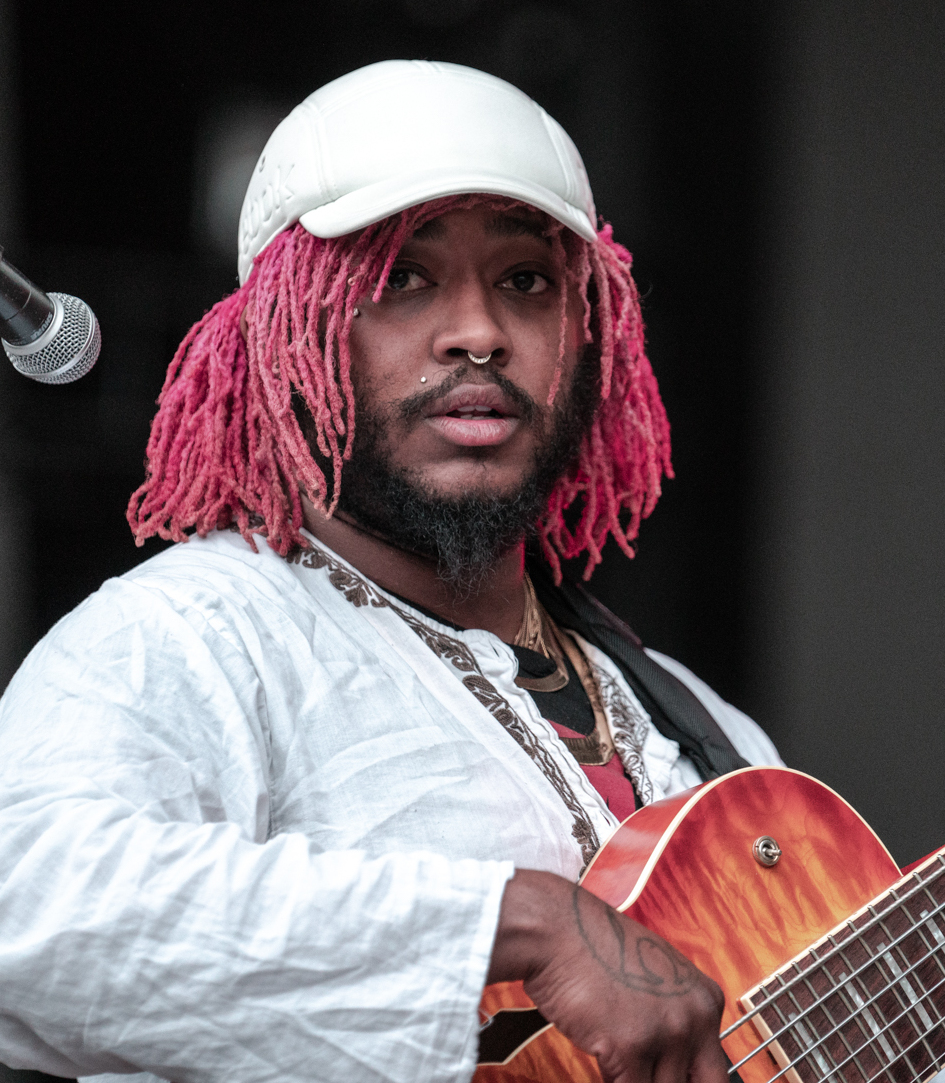
Thundercat (pictured in 2018) collaborated with Miller on multiple tracks from Balloonerism through jam sessions, mostly providing bass guitar.

The period when Balloonerism was recorded is disputed. Some publications claimed it was recorded between 2013 and 2014, conceived amidst the production of Watching Movies with the Sound Off. Rolling Stone writer Maya Georgi stated that the album was recorded in the spring of 2014, while its liner notes list the recording dates as between 2014 and 2016 and was recorded at The Sanctuary in Los Angeles. Much of the Balloonerism sessions came from Miller's friendship with Thundercat, who shared similar tastes in humor and collaborated in a freewheeling, improvisational approach. Usually, a track from the album was finished within a day with little revision.

In the production of Balloonerism, Miller provided the tambourine on four tracks, drums on three tracks, and served as a recording engineer in two tracks. Thundercat worked on the majority of the album, providing bass in eight tracks and additional vocals on "DJ's Chord Organ". SZA provided additional vocals on "DJ's Chord Organ" and "Friendly Hallucinations". Jameel and Ronald Bruner provided keyboards and drums, respectively, on "5 Dollar Pony Rides". "Mrs. Deborah Downer" features additional vocals from Ashley All Day, and "Manakins" and "Rick's Piano" features additional vocals from Dylan Reynolds, with the latter involving guitar. Balloonerism was mixed by E. Dan and mastered by Mike Bozzi.

The album cover was painted by artist Alim Smith, which depicts an abstract portrait of Miller. Smith posted it in September 2018 following Miller's death. A month prior, she posted a similar painting, with Miller's response being "need this". Upon the album's release, Smith revealed that she was unaware that her painting was being used by fans on their own revisions of Balloonerism until after Miller's estate reached out to her in 2024.

=== Work with Rick Rubin ===
By the summer of 2014, Miller was struggling with severe depression and substance abuse, which led him to collaborate with producer and record label founder Rick Rubin for help. Rubin later revealed that Miller called him while drunk on his way to a European tour, saying "Rick, dude, I'm fucked up, will you help me?". Miller went into sobriety during his time of making music at Rubin's personal studio. Two tracks that Miller worked on with Rubin appeared on the official release of Balloonerism. "Shangri-La" was likely recorded approximately during the summer of 2014 at Rubin's studio of the same name, while "Rick's Piano" was initially titled "Rick Rubin's Piano".

=== Additional perspectives ===
E. Dan of ID Labs revealed his thoughts about the project in a now-deleted post, where he revealed that Miller made a track list and that the majority of the tracks from Balloonerism were made within a week consisting of jam sessions. Dan claimed that Miller took a few tracks for Faces and moved on from the project. He later addressed his fans that the artwork and track lists from online versions of Balloonerism were fan-made, adding that Miller made a few iTunes playlists consisting of the project and was left unfinished.

Quentin Cuff, who was Miller's best friend and former tour manager, briefly mentioned Balloonerism in the book The Book of Mac: Remembering Mac Miller (2021), and revealed that it was conceptualized before Faces. With Miller and recording engineer Josh Berg recording the project at The Sanctuary in Los Angeles, Cuff described their process as "cooking up very zany, otherworldly, weird creations" during a Passion of the Weiss interview.

=== Aftermath ===
Following the album's production, Miller regularly gave discussions about the release of Balloonerism, though his other projects including GO:OD AM (2015) took precedence. In 2020, a Reddit user leaked tracks from the Balloonerism sessions, including "Do You Have a Destination", "Uber", and "He Finally Sleeps", and created a detailed timeline of the album's leaks. The user also discovered that the album artwork was commissioned from Alim Smith and that the domain name Balloonerism.com was registered in 2014. Many Miller fans made their own iterations of the album, including other tracks such as "Colors and Shapes", "Stoned", and "Tambourine Dream". In 2022, Miller's brother Miller McCormick, who helps manage the former's music following his death, began seriously discussing a commercial release of Balloonerism with Berg and E. Dan.

== Music and lyrics ==
=== Overview ===
Balloonerism is a neo soul and experimental hip-hop album with jazz, psychedelia, and funk influences. Thematically, the album centers on Miller's drug use, depression, lost love, a longing for childhood innocence, and existential angst throughout the album. Using his philosophy about life and death while finding answers about it, the album's contrasts are used throughout by tapping into dark themes while presenting the concept in a "preachy and bright" tone.

Themes about drugs remain common throughout Balloonerism, where Miller uses metaphoric lyrics such as "Even pills turn the power, the world wanna crush you down", to parts where his delivery becomes more slurred and downbeat. He emphasizes vague storytelling, rhetorical questions, and metaphors that come off as blunt when relating to his personal struggles and death. Whynow writer Aaron Edwards metaphorically described the album's title to represent Miller's "euphoric state before his balloon is burst and he falls back down to earth." Matthew Strauss of Pitchfork reflected that the album still expressed a duality of happier themes from Miller's frat rap period while adding a more "lurid and dangerous" style with sadness.

Rolling Stone writer Maya Georgi described Balloonerism as sounding like outtakes from Watching Movies with the Sound Off and Faces. AllMusic considered it to represent a series of ideas that feel "both carefree and on the brink of implosion." Compositionally, the album's instrumentation features "heavenly hard samples and wistfully beautiful piano loops." "Woozy, electric guitar" and bass lines commonly appear in tracks including "Stoned", "Friendly Hallucinations", and "Mrs. Deborah Drowner". Georgi's consider the album's style as a precursor to Miller's funk-based album The Divine Feminine and the instrumentation of Swimming (2018).

=== Tracks 1–7 ===
"Tambourine Dream" opens as a half-minute instrumental that features a mix of tambourines, maracas, and "distant skimming of drum skins". Progressing to "DJ's Chord Organ", the song begins with a sound collage in its first few minutes, which combines distant vocal harmonies with soft organ chords and building drums. In the middle of the song, SZA appears with a "strutting verse over a circusy organ riff". Featuring additional vocals from Thundercat instead of Miller's, the latter composed by using the chord organ of singer-songwriter Daniel Johnston, initially under the title "The Song That Changed Everything".

On "Do You Have a Destination?", Miller brags about having "supermodels in his swimming pool" before admitting that he feels disconnected despite his success. The song shows a "daydreamy" approach with various additions such as ad-libs, background singing, vocal distortion, boom bap-esque production, and piano riffs revolving around the song. The next track, "5 Dollar Pony Rides", continues with a boom bap style. Being introspective and emotive, Miller sings about "fleeting pleasures and loneliness" to a lover while yearning for a vacation. Rather than materialistic items, he wants to fill the woman's soul with "what she needs." The song concludes with "funky" basslines, soft vocals and soul intonations.

"Friendly Hallucinations" features a smooth baseline from Thundercat and a "catchy hook", with the song described as sounding like a "soul-infused haunted house with soft loving vocals" that evolve into a "trance-like chant". Lyrically, Miller reflects on his relationship with drugs and how much it impacted some of his friendships. Continuing the weight of his drug addiction, "Mrs. Deborah Downer" shows his self-confrontation on "where he would be without drugs" as crashing cymbals persist throughout the song, Being self-reflexive and corrective at the same time, it serves in a way that is described as "distorted yet optimistic" with slowly played bass from Thundercat. A similar-sounding song with an anthemic tone, "Stoned" narrates a story about a woman whose preference for "isolation and self-serving deception is curable" in a way Miller knows how. Featuring a smooth guitar riff, Miller sings to the woman about getting high, which he "compares to heaven, with her."

=== Tracks 8–14 ===
"Shangri-La" marks a departure from Thundercat's jazz-based sound, where Balloonerism evolves to a more "sultry-toned-rap" sound. In a pitched down voice with a lack of drums and bright synths, Miller raps about death, in which he says, "If I'm dying young, promise you'll smile at my funeral". On the opening of "Funny Papers", Miller opens the song with "Did no one ever teach you how to dance?" in a "silly, old Hollywood voice". Based on a simple beat and bittersweet piano tune, the song features continues Miller's contemplative lyrics about death and the loss of innocence, using themes of childhood to complement it as a "pensive, nostalgic" tone. On one of the song's verses, he tells a story about a baby boy who later questions why his loving mother would subject him to a cruel world.

"Excelsior", described as an interlude, shows Miller's experimental style by merging real-life sounds with trip hop beats, including the sounds of screaming children that reminds him of his imaginative childhood. He reveals on the song that he wanted to be a magician growing up, hence closing it with "abracadabra". "Transformations" features Miller's pitch-shifted horrorcore alter ego Delusional Thomas, which explores darker themes and lyrics based on his own psychosis. The Line of Best Fit writer Lana Marshall described the song as a conversation between Miller and Thomas.

Over a harp-infused instrumental and psychedelic influences, Miller adds a stronger emotional weight to Balloonerism on "Manakins", as he speaks about dying while drifting sonically. Shifting to another track, which opens with a Rick Rubin-centered knock knock joke, "Rick's Piano" refers to Miller's experience with using a keyboard at Rubin's studio, with topics based on death, searching for happiness, and hope. He questions what death feels like and why it "steals life", as well as the existence of Heaven by promising that "the best is yet to come." The concluding track, "Tomorrow Will Never Know", expands to nearly twelve minutes, which features muffled sounds of children playing while a telephone rings in the distance, as well as lyrical ruminations over death, suicide, and pressure. Capturing a "dubious and dark" mood, Miller wonders if God would give him a break before deciding that it wouldn't matter. An automated voicemail plays throughout the track, as he becomes unable to answer his phone calls by its conclusion.

== Promotion and release ==
On November 16, 2024, a visual trailer for Balloonerism was screened at Camp Flog Gnaw, between Sampha and the Alchemist's sets. An animated trailer that runs for nearly three minutes, it shows two kids playing on a playground until an object falls from the sky and "impacts the ground in the distance." Following this, multiple rodents are seen "going on an epic journey with trippy visuals", before concluding with the word "soon" and the album's artwork as the music is set to the then-leaked song "5 Dollar Pony Rides". A few days after the album's announcement, Miller's family released a statement on their intention to release Balloonerism, which was to showcase "both the breadth of his musical talents and fearlessness as an artist" and serve as a response to unofficial versions of the album that circulated for years. Subsequently, they announced the release date to be January 17, 2025. On January 7, the track list was revealed.

On January 9, 2025, "5 Dollar Pony Rides" was released as the lead single for Balloonerism. On January 13, it was announced that an animated short film based on the album would be previewed in advanced theatre screenings. It was later made available on Amazon Prime Video on the day of the album's release. On January 17, 2025, Balloonerism was released to streaming services and digital download, through Warner Records. Physically, the album was released on LP, CD, and cassette, along with a limited edition deluxe LP version that includes a white splattered cloud cover, poster, a 32-page booklet featuring photos and lyrics, and a 3D pop-up centerfold. In addition, unisex T-shirts and sweatshirts were made available. On the day of its release, Balloonerism received praise from fans, with one stating that it sounded like "he came back from the dead and recorded this last year", while another complimented the album's vulnerability and existential themes. SZA gave a tribute to Miller on X, stating that she was grateful "he saw something in me before most and treated me w love from day 1", and also revealed that "DJ's Chord Organ" was entirely unchanged from its original recording.

== Critical reception ==
Professional ratings
Aggregate scores
Source	Rating
AnyDecentMusic?	7.4/10
Metacritic	77/100
Review scores
Source	Rating
AllMusic	4/5 stars
Clash	8/10
The Independent	4/5 stars
The Line of Best Fit	8/10
The Observer	4/5 stars
Paste	7.5/10
Pitchfork	7.4/10
Rolling Stone	3/5 stars
The Standard	3/5 stars

Balloonerism was met with generally positive reviews from music critics. According to the review aggregator Metacritic, Balloonerism received "generally favorable reviews" based on a weighted average score of 77 out of 100 from 10 critic scores. The Independent's Helen Brown praised the album, in which she said that it gives a "complete and cohesive" structure compared to other posthumous albums, and that the significant aspect of the album comes from its percussion. Lana Marshall of The Line of Best Fit considered it to be an "emotive and plaintive testament" to Miller's legacy and impact on hip-hop. Robin Murray of Clash praised Balloonerism, noting it for its cohesive structure and high quality as a posthumous work.

Sean Fennell of Flood Magazine praised the album's psychedelic influence and its emotionally resonant songs, while he considered its posthumous nature to complicate its interpretation, remaining in uncertainty whether Miller intended to release Balloonerism in its present form. Gavyn Green of Paste characterized it as a laid-back and introspective album that shows Miller's "musical soul-searching" while retaining the lyricism of his earlier work. He highlighted one of its tracks, "Funny Pagers", as an example of the album's ambiguity and stated that its quieter details help make Balloonerism more comforting to revisit. HotNewHipHop writer Gabriel Bras Nevares noted that the album was an example of Miller's experimentation and vulnerability that was developing "behind the scenes of his mainstream mid-2010s output", seeing it as "nothing less than idiosyncratic."

Matthew Strauss of Pitchfork highlighted the intimate and melancholic aspects in Balloonerism's production, including Miller's melodic vocals, reminiscent songwriting, and the use of comforting music from dark emotions. He eventually characterized the album as a sweet and sedate "mood piece". Maddy Mussen of The Standard viewed Balloonerism as a bridge between his earlier frat-based hip-hop style and his more genre-fluid style of his later career, describing it as an introspective, emotionally difficult, and less accessible album compared to his other albums. New Wave Magazine writer Awan Magumbe saw it as a posthumous album that gives listeners insight into Miller's personal reflections and artistic development, in which he regarded as a substantial addition to his discography.

Wonderland reviewer Ben Tibbits stated that Balloonerism represents an "imperfect odyssey into the mind of a searching soul", praising Miller's emotional depth and melancholic elements throughout the album. AllMusic stated that while Balloonerism may not be Miller's greatest, consistent, or most experimental work, he saw it as an unseen chapter in his artistic evolution. Though Rolling Stone writer Maya Georgi gave a mixed reception to the album, she considered Balloonerism to reflect the darker side of Miller's thoughts, stating that the album's songs "hold a different weight" than when he was alive.

== Commercial performance ==
In the United States, Balloonerism debuted at number three on the US Billboard 200, behind Bad Bunny's Debí Tirar Más Fotos and SZA's SOS, earning 81,000 album-equivalent units (including 41,000 copies in traditional album sales) during its first week. This became Miller's eighth US top-ten album. The album marked the highest debut of the week and was the best-selling album of the week with 41,000 units sold. With 32,000 on vinyl, it served as Miller's his best sales week on vinyl and Balloonerism topped multiple Billboard album charts, including Top Album Sales, Top Rap Albums, Vinyl Albums and Indie Store Album Sales. It also peaked at number two on the US Top R&B/Hip-Hop Albums chart and was ranked number 78 on its year-end chart by the end of 2025. The album later received a nomination for Best Recording Package at the 68th Annual Grammy Awards, with credits to Bráulio Amado and Alim Smith.

In the United Kingdom, Balloonerism peaked at number sixteen on the UK Albums chart and topped the UK R&B Albums chart. In Australia, it peaked at number twelve on its albums chart and number two on its hip-hop albums chart. Elsewhere, the album topped the Belgium Albums (Flanders) chart; peaked at the top five in Canada, the Netherlands, New Zealand, and Poland; peaked at the top ten in Austria, Denmark, Germany, Sweden, and Switzerland; and also appeared in Belgium (Wallonia), Croatia, Finland, France, Hungary, Iceland, Ireland, Italy, Lithuania, Norway, Scotland, and Spain.

== Short film ==
A short film based on Balloonerism was first announced on January 13, 2025. It received advance theatre screenings nationally from New York to Pittsburgh (Miller's home city) on January 15, and internationally the following day before its release on Amazon Prime Video on January 17. The short film was directed by Samuel Jerome Mason, who also directed Miller's "Colors and Shapes" (2014) music video. It was written by Sam Mason and Roland Kennedy, produced by Heather Hardin and Stephanie Demeautis, edited by Minseok Kim, and executively produced by Michael Feder, Greg Bedard, and Hana Shimizu.

Balloonerism was directly influenced from the album's lyrics and visualized Miller's interest in themes of "youthful wonderment". Its plot follows a group of school friends, led by Timmy, who are "transfigured by the music of a chord organ" and moved into a "shadow world", where they go through the "underbelly of adulthood." Stylized in "texturally realistic" 3D computer graphics, the short film was produced by Hornet Studios with distribution from Miller's independent label Remember Music and Warner Records. The short film's characters were inspired from the song "Excelsior", and its only dialogue consist of Miller's vocals from the album.

== Track listing ==
Balloonerism track listing
No.	Title	Writer(s)	Producer(s)	Length
1.	"Tambourine Dream"	Malcolm McCormick	Larry Fisherman	0:33
2.	"DJ's Chord Organ" (featuring SZA)	McCormick; Solana Rowe; Stephen Bruner	Fisherman	5:15
3.	"Do You Have a Destination?"	McCormick; Taylor Graves	Fisherman; Graves	3:24
4.	"5 Dollar Pony Rides"	McCormick; Jameel Bruner; S. Bruner; Ronald Bruner Jr.	Fisherman; J. Bruner; R. Bruner; Thundercat	3:42
5.	"Friendly Hallucinations"	McCormick; S. Bruner; Graves; Marlon Williams; Antonio Hardy	Thundercat; Graves	4:45
6.	"Mrs. Deborah Downer"	McCormick; S. Bruner; Graves; Ashley Sousa	Fisherman; Thundercat; Graves	4:04
7.	"Stoned"	McCormick; Malcolm McLaren; Anne Dudley; Trevor Horn	Fisherman	4:03
8.	"Shangri-La"	McCormick; Graves	Fisherman; Graves^{[a]}	2:49
9.	"Funny Papers"	McCormick; S. Bruner; Graves	Fisherman; Thundercat; Graves	4:23
10.	"Excelsior"	McCormick	Fisherman	2:23
11.	"Transformations" (featuring Delusional Thomas)	McCormick; S. Bruner; J. Bruner; Graves	Fisherman; Thundercat; J. Bruner	3:04
12.	"Manakins"	McCormick	Fisherman	3:09
13.	"Rick's Piano"	McCormick; S. Bruner; Dylan Rectenwald	Fisherman; Thundercat; Dylan Reynolds	5:08
14.	"Tomorrow Will Never Know"	McCormick; S. Bruner	Fisherman	11:53
Total length:				58:43

=== Notes ===
- ^{^[a]} indicates an additional producer
- "Friendly Hallucinations" contains excerpts and samples of "Just Rhymin' with Biz" written by Antonio M. Hardy and Marlon Williams.
- "Stoned" contains a sample of "Buffalo Gals" written by Malcolm McLaren, Anne Dudley, and Trevor Horn.

== Personnel ==
Credits adapted from the album's liner notes.

- Malcolm McCormick – lead vocals (all tracks), percussion (track 1), drums (track 6, 9, 11), recording (tracks 11, 13)
- Thundercat – bass (tracks 2, 4–6, 9, 11, 13, 14), additional vocals (track 2)
- Taylor Graves – keyboards (tracks 3, 5, 6, 9, 11), drums (track 5), background vocals (track 8)
- Jameel Bruner – keyboards (track 4)
- Ronald Bruner – drums (track 4)
- SZA – additional vocals (tracks 2, 5)
- Ashley All Day – additional vocals (track 6)
- Dylan Reynolds – additional vocals (tracks 12, 13), guitar (track 13)
- Josh Berg – recording, photography
- E. Dan – mixing
- Mike Bozzi – mastering
- Alim Smith – cover
- Rex Arrow – photography
- Bráulio Amado – design, packaging

== Charts ==
=== Weekly charts ===
Weekly chart performance for Balloonerism
Chart (2025)	Peak position
Australian Albums (ARIA)	12
Australian Hip Hop/R&B Albums (ARIA)	2
Austrian Albums (Ö3 Austria)	9
Belgian Albums (Ultratop Flanders)	1
Belgian Albums (Ultratop Wallonia)	11
Canadian Albums (Billboard)	5
Croatian International Albums (HDU)	17
Danish Albums (Hitlisten)	10
Dutch Albums (Album Top 100)	3
Finnish Albums (Suomen virallinen lista)	36
French Albums (SNEP)	33
German Albums (Offizielle Top 100)	8
Hungarian Albums (MAHASZ)	23
Icelandic Albums (Tónlistinn)	33
Irish Albums (Official Charts)	19
Italian Albums (FIMI)	45
Lithuanian Albums (AGATA)	16
New Zealand Albums (RMNZ)	3
Norwegian Albums (VG-lista)	24
Polish Albums (ZPAV)	5
Scottish Albums (Official Charts)	11
Spanish Albums (Promusicae)	29
Swedish Physical Albums (Sverigetopplistan)	9
Swiss Albums (Schweizer Hitparade)	6
UK Albums (Official Charts)	16
UK R&B Albums (Official Charts)	1
US Billboard 200	3
US Top R&B/Hip-Hop Albums (Billboard)	2

=== Year-end charts ===
Year-end chart performance for Balloonerism
Chart (2025)	Position
US Top R&B/Hip-Hop Albums (Billboard)	78
