= Blue World (Mac Miller song) =

2020 single by Mac Miller

Single by Mac Miller

from the album Circles
- Released: February 4, 2020
- Genre: Hip-hop
- Length: 3:29
- Label: Warner
- Songwriters: Malcolm McCormick; Guy Lawrence; George Forrest; Robert Wright
- Producers: Lawrence; Jon Brion

Mac Miller singles chronology
"Good News" (2020)	"Blue World" (2020)	"5 Dollar Pony Rides" (2025)

Music video
- "Blue World" on YouTube

"Blue World" is a song by American rapper Mac Miller from his sixth studio album, Circles (2020). It was sent to rhythmic contemporary radio on February 4, 2020, as the second single from the album. The song was written by Miller and Guy Lawrence of Disclosure, with George Forrest and Robert Wright receiving writing credits due to a use of "It's a Blue World" by the Four Freshmen as a sample. The song was produced by Lawrence and Jon Brion.

The song was ranked number 71 on The Fader's list of the 100 best songs of 2020. It was also on former U.S. president Barack Obama's playlist of his favorite music of 2020, and would go on to be featured in the soundtrack for MLB The Show 23.

== Composition ==
Heran Mamo of Billboard called "Blue World" an "electronic-tinged rap" song. The track contains a sample of "It's a Blue World" by American vocal quartet The Four Freshmen, as well as a "syncopated drum pattern and hip-hop rhymes".

== Charts ==
Chart performance for "Blue World"
Chart (2020)	Peak position
Australia (ARIA)	72
Canada Hot 100 (Billboard)	57
Lithuania (AGATA)	56
Netherlands (Single Top 100)	89
New Zealand Hot Singles (RMNZ)	6
Portugal (AFP)	72
UK Singles (OCC)	84
US Billboard Hot 100	38
US Hot R&B/Hip-Hop Songs (Billboard)	22
US Rolling Stone Top 100	9

== Certifications ==
Certifications for "Blue World"
Region	Certification	Certified units/sales
New Zealand (RMNZ)	Platinum	30,000^{‡}
United Kingdom (BPI)	Silver	200,000^{‡}
United States (RIAA)	Platinum	1,000,000^{‡}
^{‡} Sales+streaming figures based on certification alone.
