= Cinderella (Mac Miller song) =

Song by Mac Miller featuring Ty Dolla Sign

from the album The Divine Feminine
- Released: September 16, 2016
- Studio: EastWest Studios (Los Angeles, California); Encore Studios (Burbank, California)
- Length: 8:00
- Label: REMember; Warner Bros.
- Songwriters: Malcolm McCormick; Aja Grant; Jeff Gitelman; Sunni Colon; Dacoury Natche; Tyrone Griffin Jr.; Vic Wainstein
- Producers: Aja Grant; DJ Dahi

"Cinderella" is a song by American rapper Mac Miller, featuring American singer-songwriter Ty Dolla Sign. In 2026, the song went viral on social media platform TikTok, resulting in a debut on many global charts and posthumously became his first top 40 single on the UK Singles Chart peaking at number 21.

== Background and release ==
"Cinderella" was written by Mac Miller, Ty Dolla Sign, Jeff Gitelman, Sunni Colon, Vic Wainstein, and its producers, DJ Dahi and Aja Grant. In subsequent coverage of the song, Ariana Grande opined that the song was about their relationship.

== Charts ==
| Chart (2026) | Peak position |
|---|---|
| Australia (ARIA) | 16 |
| Australia Hip Hop/R&B (ARIA) | 2 |
| Canada Hot 100 (Billboard) | 29 |
| Global 200 (Billboard) | 42 |
| Greece International (IFPI) | 97 |
| Iceland (Billboard) | 15 |
| Ireland (IRMA) | 42 |
| Lithuania (AGATA) | 43 |
| Malaysia (IFPI) | 11 |
| Malaysia International (RIM) | 6 |
| Netherlands (Single Top 100) | 85 |
| New Zealand (Recorded Music NZ) | 7 |
| Norway (IFPI Norge) | 41 |
| Philippines Hot 100 (Billboard Philippines) | 46 |
| Portugal (AFP) | 124 |
| Sweden (Sverigetopplistan) | 100 |
| Switzerland (Schweizer Hitparade) | 40 |
| UK Singles (Official Charts) | 21 |
| UK Hip Hop/R&B (Official Charts) | 5 |
| US Billboard Hot 100 | 25 |
| US Hot R&B/Hip-Hop Songs (Billboard) | 6 |
| US Rhythmic Airplay (Billboard) | 9 |

== Certifications ==
| Region | Certification | Certified units/sales |
|---|---|---|
| New Zealand (RMNZ) | Platinum | 30,000^{‡} |
| United Kingdom (BPI) | Silver | 200,000^{‡} |
| United States (RIAA) | Platinum | 1,000,000^{‡} |
^{‡} Sales+streaming figures based on certification alone.
