= Original (Sia song) =

Single by Sia

from the album Dolittle
- Released: 10 January 2020
- Genre: Pop
- Length: 3:34
- Label: Back Lot Music
- Songwriters: Sia Furler; Jesse Shatkin; Sean Douglas
- Producer: Jesse Shatkin

Sia singles chronology
"That's Life" (2019)	"Original" (2020)	"On" (2020)

Lyric video
- "Original" on YouTube

"Original" is a song by Australian singer and songwriter Sia from the original motion picture soundtrack of the 2020 film Dolittle. The song was released for digital download and streaming on January 10, 2020. A lyric video was made available on YouTube on 17 January 2020. "Original" marks Sia's first solo release since "Out There", her collaboration with Hans Zimmer for Seven Worlds, One Planet.

== Composition and reception ==
"Original" was written by Sia, Sean Douglas and frequent collaborator Jesse Shatkin, who also produced the song.

According to Wren Graves of Consequence of Sound, the song begins with "Sia singing the word, 'Boom,' the sound of an epiphany. The song is about a metaphorical wakening, the moment a person decides to be totally and wholly themselves". Vulture's Charu Sinha said "Original" is "the type of upbeat, anthemic pop that Sia does best".

== Credits and personnel ==
Credits adapted from Tidal.

- Sia Furler – songwriter, vocals
- Sean Douglas – songwriter
- Jesse Shatkin – producer, songwriter
- Chris Gehringer – studio personnel

== Charts ==
Chart (2020)	Peak position
Slovakia Airplay (ČNS IFPI)	20
