= 2009 (song) =

2018 song by Mac Miller

Song by Mac Miller

from the album Swimming
- Released: August 3, 2018
- Recorded: November 2016
- Length: 5:48
- Label: REMember; Warner
- Songwriters: Malcolm McCormick; Eric Gabouer; James Harris; Terry Lewis; George Jackson; Chanté Moore; Aja Grant; James Wright; Jon Brion
- Producer: Eric G

Music video
- "2009" on YouTube

"2009" is a song by American rapper Mac Miller from his fifth studio album Swimming (2018). Produced by Eric G, it contains a sample of "Chanté's Got a Man" by Chanté Moore.

== Background ==
Mac Miller recorded the song in November 2016, while in Seattle during his The Divine Feminine Tour. It was the first song that he recorded with Eric G in person. Miller asked him to play him some beats, and the beat for "2009" was the first or second one that Eric played. Miller put it in Pro Tools and recorded the first half of the song in a pitch black booth. He recorded the rest of the song a little later. Miller went to the studio for two days and entirely improvised the song.

In an interview with Vulture, Mac Miller explained the lines "Sometimes I wish I took a simpler route / Instead of having demons that’s as big as my house":

We actually joke all the time, we'll take a moment where we'll be like, Man, life would be so simple if I would've just had a job somewhere. You know, like been at one place and then come home. And there's that moment of peacefulness, when you think about it. But I would never actually do that. I'm also very attracted to my own demons. I would rather...

== Composition ==
The production is composed of strings, sparse piano keys, finger snaps, and an "occasional downbeat clatter of snares". Lyrically, the song is about self-acceptance, especially in regard to acknowledging that the good times have passed, moving forward and valuing the positive aspects of the present and future, as well as restraining self-destructive behaviors. Mac Miller also expresses a newfound belief in God.

== Critical reception ==
Hannah Mylrea of NME called the song a "triumph". Regarding Mac Miller's lyrics about his "demons", Mosi Reeves of Rolling Stone wrote "If he could surface those demons with more vivid details and add texture to his lyrics instead of simply using them as a rhythmic device, then he may have a genuinely classic album in him yet." Some music critics commented on the lyrics "Every day I wake up and breathe / I don't have it all but that's all right with me"; Pitchfork's Evan Rytlewski wrote that although Miller "only sounds half-convinced", "Swimming is most engaging when it details the simple things Miller tells himself to keep his spirits up." Variety's A.D. Amorosi described that the lines exemplified "a mix of the smartly nihilistic, the pragmatically cheerful and a glad-to-be-unhappy lyrical signature that's irresistible in its sourness."

== Charts ==
Chart (2018)	Peak position
US Bubbling Under Hot 100 (Billboard)	1
US Hot R&B/Hip-Hop Songs (Billboard)	49

== Certifications ==
Region	Certification	Certified units/sales
New Zealand (RMNZ)	Gold	15,000^{‡}
United States (RIAA)	Platinum	1,000,000^{‡}
^{‡} Sales+streaming figures based on certification alone.
