= Funny Papers (song) =

2025 single by Mac Miller

Single by Mac Miller

from the album Balloonerism
- Released: January 17, 2025
- Recorded: March 2014
- Genre: Jazz rap
- Length: 4:23
- Label: Warner
- Songwriters: Malcolm McCormick; Stephen Bruner; Taylor Graves
- Producers: Larry Fisherman; Thundercat; Graves

Mac Miller singles chronology
"5 Dollar Pony Rides" (2025)	"Funny Papers" (2025)	"She Knows Too Much" (2026)

"Funny Papers" is a song by American rapper Mac Miller, released on January 17, 2025, from his seventh studio album, Balloonerism, as the second single. It was produced by Miller himself (as Larry Fisherman), Thundercat and Taylor Graves.

== Composition ==
"Funny Papers" is a jazz rap song. The production consists of twinkling piano melodies and boom bap drums. Some critics have compared the style to that of Mac Miller's song "2009".

== Critical reception ==
The song was met with positive reception from critics. Elias Andrews of HotNewHipHop considered it a "sign of the musical maturity that Miller would fully realize with 2018's Swimming." Gabriel Bras of HotNewHipHop called the song "gorgeous" and wrote it "rivals '2009'." Reviewing Balloonerism for Pitchfork, Matthew Strauss praised the album for "the little moments where you feel like your favorite artist is making something especially for you because they're really just making it for themselves—like when Miller opens 'Funny Papers' by asking in a silly, old-Hollywood voice, 'Did no one ever teach you how to dance?'" Gavyn Green of Paste wrote "For fans of Mac's more laid-back pieces, Balloonerism delivers on all fronts", and that "'Funny Papers' encapsulates this ambiguity perfectly." He added, "It's subtle moments like this, scattered throughout the album, that make Balloonerism so easy and comforting to return to."

HotNewHipHop ranked the song as the 7th best rap song of 2025.

== Charts ==
Chart performance for "Funny Papers"
Chart (2025)	Peak position
Canada Hot 100 (Billboard)	68
New Zealand Hot Singles (RMNZ)	2
US Billboard Hot 100	77
US Hot R&B/Hip-Hop Songs (Billboard)	16
