= Dang! (song) =

2016 single by Mac Miller

Single by Mac Miller featuring Anderson .Paak

from the album The Divine Feminine
- Released: July 28, 2016
- Studio: Jungle City Studios; Blast Off Productions (both in New York City)
- Genre: Pop-rap; R&B; jazz-funk
- Length: 5:05
- Label: REMember Music; Warner Bros.
- Songwriters: Malcolm McCormick; David Pimentel; Brandon Anderson
- Producer: Pomo

Mac Miller singles chronology
"Weekend" (2016)	"Dang!" (2016)	"Into You (Alex Ghenea Remix)" (2016)

Anderson .Paak singles chronology
"Dance Off" (2016)	"Dang!" (2016)	"'Til It's Over" (2018)

Music video
- "Dang!" on YouTube

"Dang!" is a song by American rapper Mac Miller featuring American rapper Anderson .Paak. It was released on July 28, 2016, as the lead single from Miller's fourth studio album The Divine Feminine (2016).

== Composition ==
Matthew Strauss of Pitchfork has described the song having an "addictive" funk instrumental that "features horns by Juilliard students." In an interview with Genius, Mac Miller revealed that Anderson .Paak "wrote the song for people who passed away."

== Live performances ==
Miller and Paak performed "Dang!" on The Late Show with Stephen Colbert on September 15, 2016. At the One Love Manchester benefit concert on June 4, 2017, Miller performed the song with singer Ariana Grande, who subbed in for Paak.

== Track listing ==
- Digital download

1. "Dang!" featuring Anderson .Paak – 5:05

- Digital download – Radio Edit

1. "Dang!" (Radio Edit) featuring Anderson .Paak – 4:01

== Credits and personnel ==
Credits and personnel adapted from Tidal and The Divine Feminine's liner notes.

Recording

- Recorded at Jungle City Studios (New York City) and Blast Off Productions (New York City)
- Mixed at Encore Recording Studios (Burbank, California)
- Mastered at Sterling Sound (New York City)

Personnel

- Mac Miller – lead vocals, songwriting
- Anderson .Paak – secondary vocals, songwriting
- David "Pomo" Pimentel – production, songwriting, bass guitar, drums, keyboards
- Danny McKinnon – guitar
- Braxton Cook – horn
- Enrique Sanchez – horn
- Jeffery Oliver – horn
- Julian Lee – horn
- Derek Ali – mixing
- Chris Gehringer – mastering
- Nicholas Cavalieri – recording
- Zeke Mishanec – recording
- Brendan Silas Parry – recording assistant

== Charts ==
Chart (2016)	Peak position
Australia (ARIA)	99
Belgium (Ultratip Bubbling Under Flanders)	3
France (SNEP)	128
Mexico Ingles Airplay (Billboard)	37
US Bubbling Under Hot 100 (Billboard)	7
US Hot R&B/Hip-Hop Songs (Billboard)	45
US Rhythmic Airplay (Billboard)	20

== Certifications ==
Region	Certification	Certified units/sales
Denmark (IFPI Danmark)	Gold	45,000^{‡}
France (SNEP)	Gold	100,000^{‡}
New Zealand (RMNZ)	2× Platinum	60,000^{‡}
Portugal (AFP)	Gold	5,000^{‡}
United Kingdom (BPI)	Gold	400,000^{‡}
United States (RIAA)	Platinum	1,000,000^{‡}
^{‡} Sales+streaming figures based on certification alone.
