= Self Care (song) =

Single by Mac Miller

from the album Swimming
- Released: July 13, 2018
- Recorded: 2017
- Studio: Conway (Los Angeles); ID Labs (Pittsburgh)
- Genre: R&B; space-funk; cloud rap
- Length: 5:45
- Label: Warner Bros.
- Songwriters: Malcolm McCormick; Dacoury Natche; Eric Dan; Destin Route; Erica Wright; Jahmal Cantero; Devonte Hynes; Tyler Mason; Peter Mudge
- Producers: DJ Dahi; ID Labs; Nostxlgic; Nice Rec (add.)

Mac Miller singles chronology
"Small Worlds" (2018)	"Self Care" (2018)	"What's the Use?" (2018)

Music video
- "Self Care" on YouTube

"Self Care" is a song recorded by American rapper Mac Miller for his fifth studio album Swimming (2018). It was written by Miller, Destin Route, Erica Wright, Jahmal Cantero, Devonte Hynes, and its producers Dacoury Natche, Eric Dan, Tyler Mason, and Peter Mudge. The track was released on July 13, 2018, as the second single from the album. Musically, "Self Care" is a two-part song, described as a "self-guided tour through [Miller's] personal rehabilitation" by Pitchfork's Sheldon Pearce.

"Self Care" peaked at number 33 on the US Billboard Hot 100 after Miller's death in September 2018, becoming his highest-charting song as lead artist at the time. The song was certified triple platinum in the United States. Its music video, which references the film Kill Bill: Volume 2, shows Miller escaping a coffin after being buried alive.

== Background and composition ==
"Self Care" was released by Warner Bros. Records on July 13, 2018, as the second single from Mac Miller's fifth studio album Swimming. It is a two-part song, split between "Self Care" and "Oblivion". The first part was written by Miller, Destin Route, Devonte Hynes, and its producers Dacourny "DJ Dahi" Natche and Peter "Nice Rec" Mudge; it also contains an excerpt from "On & On" by Erykah Badu, which was written by Badu and Jahmal Cantero. The second part was written by Miller and its producers Eric Dan, Tyler "Nostxlgic" Mason, and Mudge. Each part was recorded separately in 2017, at Conway Recording Studios in Los Angeles and ID Labs in Pittsburgh, respectively.

"Self Care" contains elements of R&B, space-funk and cloud rap. The song begins with "watercolor synth washes", as Miller croons its affirming chorus. Around halfway through, it abruptly switches to an "airy synth and glitchy" beat, turning its vibe "from claustrophobic to weightless." Billboard's Gil Kaufman said the song "chronicles an emotional spiral, with Mac spinning out into 'oblivion,' which sounds like exactly the place he wants to be." Sheldon Pearce of Pitchfork described it as a "breezy, self-guided tour through [Miller's] personal rehabilitation."

== Commercial performance ==
In the United States, "Self Care" debuted at number 24 on the Billboard Bubbling Under Hot 100, and peaked at number 5 on the chart dated August 18, 2018. After Miller's death in September 2018, "Self Care" was propelled to number 33 on the US Billboard Hot 100, surpassing "Loud" (2012; number 53) as his highest-charting song as lead artist at the time. It also reached his highest peak as lead artist in Australia at number 83 on the ARIA Charts, in Canada at number 38 on the Canadian Hot 100, and in the United Kingdom at number 61 on the UK Singles Chart. His peaks set by "Self Care" were later surpassed by "Good News" in 2020. In December 2024, "Self Care" was certified 6× platinum by the Recording Industry Association of America (RIAA) for combined sales and streaming data in excess of six million units in the United States.

== Music video ==
A music video for "Self Care" was released on the same day as the song. Directed by Christian Weber, it begins with Miller buried alive inside a coffin. He raps his verses while smoking a cigarette, and carves "Memento mori" (Latin: "remember (that you have) to die") into the coffin using a pocket knife. After punching a hole into the coffin and emerging from the dirt, explosions send him flying. The video is an homage to a scene from the 2004 film Kill Bill: Volume 2.

== Personnel ==
Credits adapted from Swimming's liner notes and Tidal.

- Malcolm McCormick – lead vocals (as Mac Miller), songwriting
- Peter Mudge – additional production, additional programming (as Nice Rec)
- Ben Sedano – engineering assistant
- John Armstrong – engineering assistant
- Manny Marroquin – mix
- Chris Galland – engineering mix
- Robin Florent – engineering mix assistant
- Scott Desmarais – engineering mix assistant
- Mike Bozzi – mastering

"Self Care"

- Dacourny Natche – production, programming (as DJ Dahi)
- Devonte Hynes – songwriting, additional vocals
- Destin Route – songwriting, additional vocals (as JID)
- Erica Wright – songwriting
- Jahmal Cantero – songwriting
- Vic Wainstein – recording

"Oblivion"

- Eric Dan – production, programming, recording (as ID Labs)
- Tyler Mason – production, programming (as Nostxlgic)

== Charts ==
Chart (2018)	Peak position
Australia (ARIA)	83
Canada Hot 100 (Billboard)	38
New Zealand Hot Singles (RMNZ)	5
Sweden Heatseeker (Sverigetopplistan)	8
UK Singles (Official Charts)	61
US Billboard Hot 100	33
US Hot R&B/Hip-Hop Songs (Billboard)	18
US Hot Rap Songs (Billboard)	15

== Certifications ==
Region	Certification	Certified units/sales
France (SNEP)	Gold	100,000^{‡}
New Zealand (RMNZ)	2× Platinum	60,000^{‡}
Poland (ZPAV)	Platinum	50,000^{‡}
Portugal (AFP)	Gold	5,000^{‡}
United Kingdom (BPI)	Gold	400,000^{‡}
United States (RIAA)	6× Platinum	6,000,000^{‡}
^{‡} Sales+streaming figures based on certification alone.
