= My Favorite Part =

Single by Mac Miller featuring Ariana Grande

from the album The Divine Feminine
- Released: September 9, 2016
- Recorded: July 2016
- Studio: EastWest Studios (Los Angeles, CA); Encore Studios (Burbank, CA)
- Genre: Neo-soul; R&B
- Length: 3:36
- Label: REMember; Warner Bros.
- Songwriter(s): Malcolm McCormick; Tyrone Johnson; Ariana Grande
- Producer(s): MusicManTy

Mac Miller singles chronology
"We" (2016)	"My Favorite Part" (2016)	"Learn How to Watch" (2017)

Ariana Grande singles chronology
"Side to Side" (2016)	"My Favorite Part" (2016)	"Faith" (2016)

Music video
- "My Favorite Part" on YouTube

"My Favorite Part" is a song by American rapper Mac Miller, featuring American singer-songwriter Ariana Grande. It was released by Warner Bros. Records as the third single from Miller's fourth studio album The Divine Feminine on September 9, 2016. The song was written by Miller, Grande, and its producer, MusicManTy. A music video was released on December 12, 2016.

== Background and release ==
"My Favorite Part" was written by Mac Miller, Ariana Grande, and its producer, Tyrone "MusicManTy" Johnson. The song was released by Warner Bros. Records on September 9, 2016, as the third single from Miller's fourth studio album The Divine Feminine (2016). "My Favorite Part" is an R&B and neo soul love song, with Miller singing instead of rapping.

It is the third collaboration between Miller and Grande, following Grande's single "The Way" (2013) and a remix of Grande's single "Into You" (2016). Miller and Grande were in a relationship when "My Favorite Part" was released, but the song had been written before it began, according to Miller.

== Music video ==
On December 12, 2016, Miller released a music video for "My Favorite Part", directed by _p. In the video, Grande enters her apartment complex in pouring rain and is helped by Miller when she drops her groceries. They enter their rooms and gaze at the wall that separates them, while reeling over their emotions for each other. After rain leaks inside, Miller visits Grande and she pulls him into her room.

== Live performances ==
Miller and Grande performed the song on a concert special for Audience Network, which aired on September 30, 2016.

== Charts ==
Chart (2016)	Peak position
New Zealand Heatseekers (Recorded Music NZ)	3
US Bubbling Under R&B/Hip-Hop Singles (Billboard)	2

== Certifications ==
Region	Certification	Certified units/sales
Poland (ZPAV)	Gold	25,000^{‡}
Portugal (AFP)	Gold	5,000^{‡}
New Zealand (RMNZ)	Platinum	30,000^{‡}
United Kingdom (BPI)	Silver	200,000^{‡}
United States (RIAA)	Platinum	1,000,000^{‡}
^{‡} Sales+streaming figures based on certification alone.
