= Balloonerism (film) =

2025 short film by Samuel Jerome Mason

- Original theatrical poster
- Directed by: Samuel Jerome Mason
- Written by: Sam Mason; Roland Kennedy
- Based on: Balloonerism (2025) by Mac Miller
- Produced by: Heather Hardin; Stephanie Demeautis
- Edited by: Minseok Kim
- Music by: Mac Miller
- Production companies: Hornet Studios; Remember Music; Warner Records
- Release dates: January 15, 2025 (Limited); January 17, 2025 (Amazon Prime Video)
- Running time: 24 minutes
- Country: United States
- Language: English

Balloonerism is a 2025 American animated short film directed by Samuel Jerome Mason with writing credits from Sam Mason and Roland Kennedy. Based on the 2025 album of the same name by rapper Mac Miller, the short film revolves around a group of children who go through a loss of innocence in a surrealist world.

== Synopsis ==
At a playground, a group of school children, led by Little Timmy, are playing until a mysterious, mystical chord organ falls from the sky. Little Timmy approaches the instruments and begins to play a haunting memory, which transfigures all of them away from reality. Transported into a colossal, dreamlike shadow world, the children become animals and find themselves in adulthood confronting anxiety, addiction, and uncertainty.

== Production ==
Balloonerism was directed by Samuel Jerome Mason, who also directed Miller's "Colors and Shapes" (2014) music video. The short film was written by Sam Mason and Roland Kennedy, produced by Heather Hardin and Stephanie Demeautis, edited by Minseok Kim, and executively produced by Michael Feder, Greg Bedard, and Hana Shimizu.

In 2023, Mason was approached by Miller's estate to work on a music film to accompany the album of the same name. Working on it shortly after, he looked through various themes, particularly its illustrative lyrics. He wanted to conceptualize the short film as a representation of "racing time and losing innocence." One of the album's lines, "But do you feel as big as your shadow?", became the central thesis for the short film's story.

Balloonerism is directly influenced from the album's lyrics and visualized Miller's interest in themes of "youthful wonderment". Its plot follows a group of school friends, led by Timmy, who are "transfigured by the music of a chord organ" and moved into a "shadow world", where they go through the "underbelly of adulthood."

Stylized in "texturally realistic" 3D computer graphics, Balloonerism visually serves as a nod to Miller's themes of his childhood in Blue Slide Park (2011), which its tone alternates between dark and whimsical. The short film was produced by Hornet Studios with distribution from Miller's independent label Remember Music and Warner Records. The short film's characters were inspired from the track "Exclesior", and its only dialogue consist of Miller's vocals from the album.

== Promotion and release ==
The short film based on Balloonerism was first announced on January 13, 2025. It received advance theatre screenings nationally from New York to Pittsburgh (Miller's home city) on January 15, and internationally the following day, including Australia, New Zealand, Germany, Ireland, France, Canada, and the United Kingdom. Tickets for the film screenings were priced at $5 as a reference to the album's track "5 Dollar Pony Rides".

Free items including popcorn, drinks, a poster, and a t-shirt were given, and all process were given to the Mac Miller fund, which provides programming and resources to underrepresented communities. On January 16, 2025, Balloonerism was announced to be released on Amazon Prime Video, which was made available alongside the album the following day.

== Critical reception ==
Luke Clister of CalTimes praised the animation and narrative structure of Balloonerism, stating that it was almost "like a thirty-minute music video of multiple songs" and that it brought a coming-of-age aspect from the album into the film. LBBOnline similarly complimented the film, stating that it doesn't just reflect the "growing pains of childhood", but the "passage of time." They saw the short film's visuals as a faithful representation to the album's themes and metaphors. Motionographer considered Balloonerism as a "heartfelt tribute" to Miller's legacy, which they saw as aiming to "immortalize his spirit through art."
