= Come Back to Earth =

2018 song by Mac Miller

Song by Mac Miller

from the album Swimming
- Released: August 3, 2018
- Genre: Cloud rap
- Length: 2:41
- Label: REMember; Warner
- Songwriters: Malcolm McCormick; Jon Brion; Jeff Gitelman
- Producers: Brion; Mac Miller; Gitty

Music video
- "Come Back to Earth" on YouTube

"Come Back to Earth" is a song by American rapper Mac Miller from his fifth studio album Swimming (2018). It was produced by Jon Brion and Miller himself, with co-production from Jeff "Gitty" Gitelman.

== Background ==
In an interview with Vulture, Mac Miller stated that he created the song in 2016 and it was one of the first songs he wrote after his The Divine Feminine tour. He wrote 11 more variations of "Come Back to Earth", before returning to the original.

== Composition ==
The song consists of orchestral arrangements, layered vocals, "trickling piano lines and gauzy synthesised sounds". It combines "shimmering instrumentals", similar to those from his album The Divine Feminine, with "trippy beats". In the lyrics, Mac Miller revolves around his mental health problems, feeling isolated, the effects of his drug use and trying to escape from his mind, while trying to make himself as comfortable as possible in his current condition. He elaborates on the album's title with the line "I was drowning, now I'm swimming", which is used as a metaphor for dealing with his problems.

== Critical reception ==
Hannah Mylrea of NME described the song's layered vocals as "gorgeous". Referring to the lyrics that reference the album title, Meaghan Garvey of The Guardian stated "Miller's writing is at its best in this simple, suggestive mode." Tara Joshi of The Observer called the song "delicate". A.D. Amorosi of Variety commented that the "eternal emptiness" in Miller's song "Hurt Feelings" is "given soft, swift dispatch on 'Come Back to Earth' where one can hear a certain fragility and frankness to Miller when he sings, 'Sunshine don't feel right… I'll do anything for a way out.' It's uneasy and discomforting."

== Charts ==
Chart (2018)	Peak position
New Zealand Hot Singles (RMNZ)	8
US Billboard Hot 100	91
US Hot R&B/Hip-Hop Songs (Billboard)	41

== Certifications ==
Region	Certification	Certified units/sales
New Zealand (RMNZ)	Platinum	30,000^{‡}
United Kingdom (BPI)	Silver	200,000^{‡}
United States (RIAA)	2× Platinum	2,000,000^{‡}
^{‡} Sales+streaming figures based on certification alone.
