= 5 Dollar Pony Rides =

2025 single by Mac Miller

Single by Mac Miller

from the album Balloonerism
- Released: January 9, 2025
- Recorded: 2014
- Genre: Jazz; funk-rap; lo-fi
- Length: 3:42
- Label: Warner
- Songwriters: Malcolm McCormick; Jameel Bruner; Stephen Bruner; Ronald Bruner Jr.
- Producers: Larry Fisherman; Jameel Bruner; Ronald Bruner Jr.; Stephen Bruner

Mac Miller singles chronology
"Blue World" (2020)	"5 Dollar Pony Rides" (2025)	"Funny Papers" (2025)

"5 Dollar Pony Rides" is a 2025 posthumous single by American rapper Mac Miller and the fourth track from his seventh studio album, Balloonerism. The track was released January 9, 2025, under Warner Records, but was recorded eleven years prior in 2014. The song is the only song from the album to be released as a single prior to Balloonerism's release. The song features production and bass-playing by Thundercat. The song, prior to its official release, was available online in the form of leaks.

== Personnel ==
Credits adapted from Apple Music.

- Mac Miller – lead vocals
- Jameel Bruner – keyboards
- Ronald Bruner Jr. – drums
- Thundercat – bass
- Josh Berg – recording engineer
- E. Dan – mixing engineer
- Mike Bozzi – mastering engineer

== Charts ==
Chart performance for "5 Dollar Pony Rides"
Chart (2025)	Peak position
Canada Hot 100 (Billboard)	91
New Zealand Hot Singles (RMNZ)	8
US Billboard Hot 100	85
US Hot R&B/Hip-Hop Songs (Billboard)	19
