= Good News (Mac Miller song) =

2020 single by Mac Miller

Single by Mac Miller

from the album Circles
- Released: January 9, 2020
- Length: 5:42
- Label: Warner
- Songwriters: Malcolm McCormick; Jon Brion
- Producers: Miller; Brion

Mac Miller singles chronology
"That's Life" (2019)	"Good News" (2020)	"Blue World" (2020)

Music video
- "Good News" on YouTube

"Good News" is a song by American rapper Mac Miller from his sixth studio album, Circles (2020). The song was written and produced by Miller and Jon Brion, and was released posthumously on January 9, 2020, as the lead single from the album. It peaked at number 17 on the US Billboard Hot 100, becoming Miller's highest-charting single as a lead artist.

== Composition ==
XXL describes the song as "tranquil" and having "some peaceful instrumentation and some sullen singing from Miller."

== Reception ==
Alphonse Pierre of Pitchfork described the song as having "a quiet optimism that pierces through the darkness." Pierre noted its similarities to Swimming: "'Good News' evokes the sound of a live band at a beach resort: sleepy guitars, slow drums, and weary singing."

== Accolades ==
Year-end lists
Publication	Accolade	Rank	Ref.
Billboard	The 100 Best Songs of 2020	43	
Laut.de	Die 50 besten Songs des Jahres	8	
Rolling Stone	The 50 Best Songs of 2020	21	
Time	10 Best Songs of 2020	5	
XXL	Best Hip-Hop Songs of 2020	—	

== Personnel ==
- Mac Miller – lead vocals, songwriting, production
- Jon Brion – songwriting, production, guitar, keyboards
- Wendy Melvoin – bass, guitar
- Matt Chamberlain – drums
- Vic Wainstein – associate producer, recording
- Eric Caudieux – recording
- Greg Koller – recording
- Rouble Kapoor – recording assistant
- Greg Koller – mixing
- Patricia Sullivan – mastering

== Charts ==
Chart (2020)	Peak position
Australia (ARIA)	27
Austria (Ö3 Austria Top 40)	48
Belgium (Ultratip Bubbling Under Flanders)	1
Belgium (Ultratip Bubbling Under Wallonia)	19
Canada (Canadian Hot 100)	14
France (SNEP)	128
Germany (GfK)	75
Greece (IFPI)	33
Ireland (IRMA)	22
Lithuania (AGATA)	10
Mexico Ingles Airplay (Billboard)	15
Netherlands (Single Top 100)	41
New Zealand (RMNZ)	17
Portugal (AFP)	21
Sweden (Sverigetopplistan)	93
Switzerland (Schweizer Hitparade)	43
UK Singles (OCC)	45
US Billboard Hot 100	17
US Hot R&B/Hip-Hop Songs (Billboard)	10
US Rolling Stone Top 100	4

== Certifications ==
Region	Certification	Certified units/sales
France (SNEP)	Gold	100,000^{‡}
New Zealand (RMNZ)	Platinum	30,000^{‡}
Poland (ZPAV)	Gold	25,000^{‡}
Portugal (AFP)	Gold	5,000^{‡}
United Kingdom (BPI)	Silver	200,000^{‡}
United States (RIAA)	Platinum	1,000,000^{‡}
^{‡} Sales+streaming figures based on certification alone.
