= Meister Verbrauchermarkt =

German supermarket chain

Meister Verbrauchermarkt GmbH
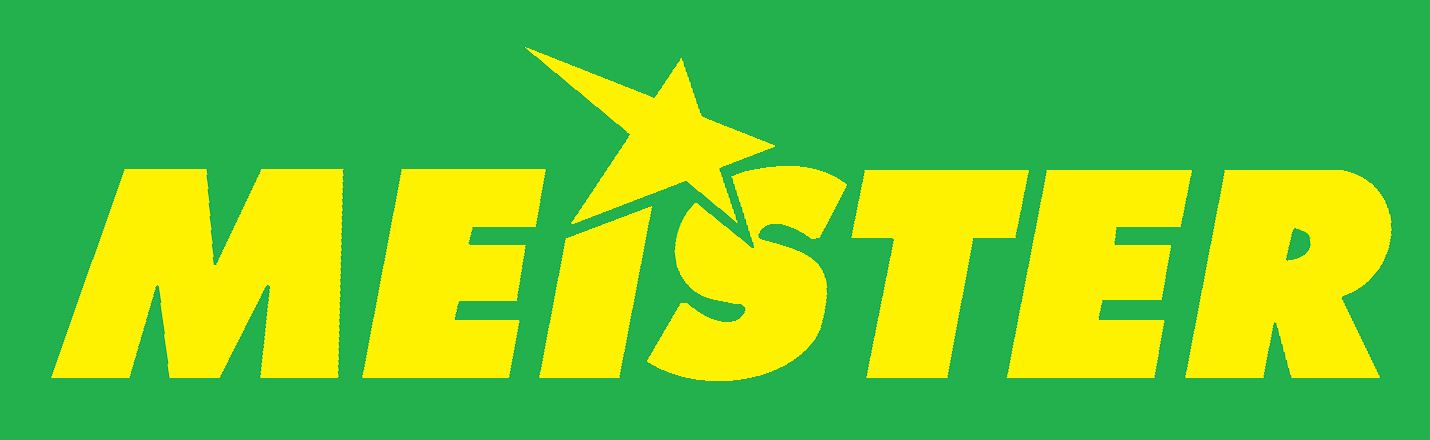
- Type: GmbH
- Industry: Food retailer
- Founded: 1959
- Defunct: 1998
- Fate: Sold to Metro AG
- Headquarters: Amberg, Germany

Meister Verbrauchermarkt GmbH was a supermarket chain in Bavaria which was founded in 1959 by Ludwig A. Meister in Erbendorf. It was sold in 1978 to Metro's predecessor Asko Deutsche Kaufhaus AG and Deutsche SB-Kauf AG and finally was merged with Metro AG in 1996. On 9 October 2002, the firm was removed from the business register.

== History ==
The business began operation in 1959, when Ludwig A. Meister converted his mother's shop in Erbendorf into a supermarket, based on the supermarkets he had seen in the USA. Up to that point, only a handful of supermarkets existed in Germany. In the following years, the business grew further and further and, a few years later, the first cash and carry market was opened.

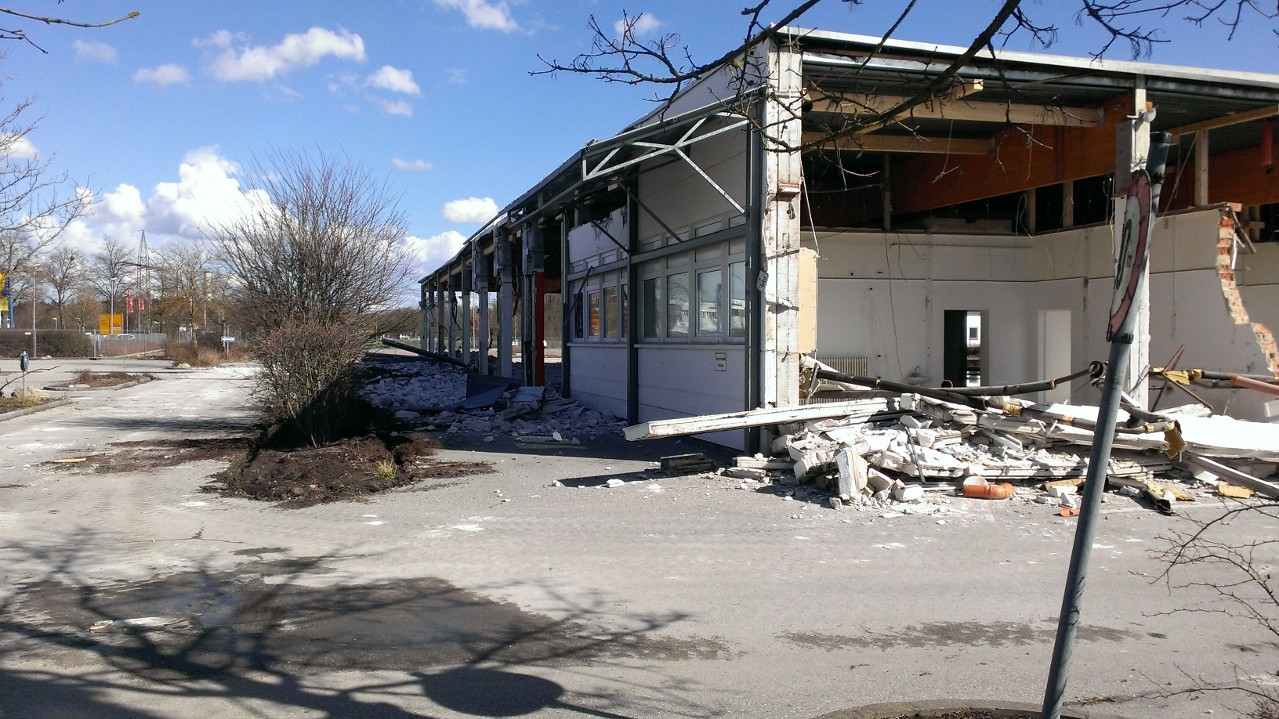
Former Meister Verbrauchermarkt in Altötting (already demolished)

=== Sale ===
In 1978, Asko Deutsche Kaufhaus AG, the predecessor to Metro AG, discovered the business and offered the owner a sum of 3 million DM; Meister accepted the offer. Upon this acquisition, Asko and its partner Deutsche SB-Kauf established MHB Handel AG, under which the supermarkets Massa, BLV and Primus were hosted. At this point in time the company already possessed 18 markets throughout north-east Bavaria. The markets continued to keep their names. In the meantime, Asko and Deutsche SB-Kauf each kept a 50% shareholding in MHB Handel AG. The location of MHB AG was Alzey. In the following years, even more markets were opened throughout Bavaria, e.g. in Altötting and Ingolstadt. In 1987 there were already 22 markets. In the meantime, the Meister Verbrauchermarkt locations were taken over in 1991 by brands belonging to MHB Handel AG, under another BLV-Markt in Neuötting.

=== Abolishment ===
In 1996, it became known that Asko Deutsche Kaufhaus AG, Deutsche SB-Kauf AG, and Kaufhof Holding AG wanted to merge themselves into a corporate group under the roof of Metro AG. Through the merger, two new supermarket chains were opened: Real and Extra. Until 2004, these remained self-reliant subsidiaries of Metro AG. Following the creation of these markets, the remaining Meister Verbrauchermarkt locations were converted into Real and Extra markets.

The firm Meister Verbrauchermarkt GmbH, which had become a subsidiary of MHB Handel AG after the takeover of Asko in 1978, was finally removed from the business register in 2002.
