= That's Life (88-Keys song) =

Single by 88-Keys featuring Mac Miller and Sia
- Released: June 20, 2019
- Recorded: February 2015 (Miller)
- Length: 3:22
- Label: Warner
- Songwriters: Charles Njapa; Malcolm McCormick; Sia Furler; Alec Gould; Daniel Glogower; Ivan Rosenberg; Jimmy O'Connell; M. LaValle; N. Ashford; Winston “Wentz” Nelson; V. Simpson
- Producer: 88-Keys

88-Keys singles chronology
"Baggage Claim" (2009)	"That's Life" (2019)	"Don't Say It's Gangsta" (2021)

Mac Miller singles chronology
"Time" (2019)	"That's Life" (2019)	"Good News" (2020)

Sia singles chronology
"I'm Still Here" (2018)	"That's Life" (2019)	"Original" (2020)

Audio video
- "That's Life" on YouTube

"That's Life" is a single by American record producer and rapper 88-Keys featuring vocals by American rapper Mac Miller and Australian singer Sia. It was released on June 20, 2019, by Warner Records. 88-Keys obtained permission from Miller's family to use his contribution posthumously.

== Background and release ==
Miller came up with the concept for the song stemming from a conversation he had with 88-Keys about relationships they were in at the time. Miller's part was recorded in New York City in February 2015, while he was working on his third studio album GO:OD AM.

A version of the song leaked online in May 2019, incorrectly titled "Benji the Dog", with Miller alone on vocals. 88-Keys responded to the leak days later, stating that it was a rough version and that the finished version would be officially released. On June 13, 2019, 88-Keys announced the release of "That's Life", also featuring Sia, and that he had obtained permission from Miller's estate to release the song posthumously. Regarding the song's development, 88-Keys said: "I played the song for Sia and she personally identified with the sentiments of the song and felt strongly about contributing her own thoughts on the subject matter."

"That's Life" was released as a single by Warner Records on June 20, 2019.

== Personnel ==
Credits adapted from Tidal.

- 88-Keys – primary artist, production, programming
- Mac Miller – featured artist, songwriting
- Sia – featured artist, songwriting, background vocals
- Alec Gould – songwriting
- Daniel Glogower – songwriting
- Ivan Rosenberg – songwriting
- Jimmy O'Connell – songwriting
- Mike LaValle – songwriting
- N. Ashford – songwriting
- Winston “Wentz” Nelson – songwriting
- V. Simpson – songwriting
- Irko – mixing
- Mauricio Iragorri – mastering
- Steve Baughman – mastering
- Frank Tatick – engineering assistant
- Zeke Mishanec – recording

== Charts ==
Chart (2019)	Peak position
New Zealand Hot Singles (RMNZ)	13

== Certifications ==
Region	Certification	Certified units/sales
United States (RIAA)	Gold	500,000^{‡}
^{‡} Sales+streaming figures based on certification alone.
