= Swimming (Mac Miller album) =

2018 studio album by Mac Miller

Studio album by Mac Miller
- Released: August 3, 2018
- Recorded: 2016–2018
- Studio: Ameraycan (North Hollywood); The Ble Compound; Home (Los Angeles); Conway (Hollywood); Dubway (New York City); Estudios del Sur (Santiago); ID Labs (Pittsburgh); Island Sound (Honolulu); Legacy (Dallas); Room 719 (Burbank); Studio X (Seattle)
- Genre: Hip-hop; jazz rap
- Length: 58:39
- Label: REMember; Warner Bros.
- Producer: Alexander Spit; Cardo; DJ Dahi; Eric G; ID Labs; J. Cole; Jon Brion; Mac Miller; Nostxlgic; Parson Brown; Pomo; Steve Lacy; Tae Beast; Tee-WaTT; Yung Exclusive

Mac Miller chronology
The Divine Feminine (2016)	Swimming (2018)	Circles (2020)

Singles from Swimming
- 1. "Small Worlds" Released: May 30, 2018; 2. "Self Care" Released: July 13, 2018; 3. "What's the Use?" Released: July 23, 2018

Swimming is the fifth studio album by American rapper Mac Miller. It was released on August 3, 2018, by REMember Music and Warner Bros. Records. Miller produced the album himself, with Jon Brion, Dev Hynes, J. Cole, ID Labs, Dâm-Funk, DJ Dahi, Tae Beast, Flying Lotus, and Cardo, among others. The album has no credited features, but contains vocal contributions from Dâm-Funk, Dev Hynes, Snoop Dogg, Syd, Thundercat, and JID. Miller died on September 7, 2018, just over a month after Swimming was released, making Swimming the final album released during Miller's lifetime.

Swimming was supported by three singles: "Small Worlds", "Self Care", and "What's the Use?". The album received generally positive reviews from critics and debuted at number three on the US Billboard 200. It was nominated for Best Rap Album at the 2019 Grammy Awards.

== Background ==
Mac Miller began work on Swimming in 2016. He announced the album through social media on July 12, 2018, alongside its release date.

== Music and lyrics ==
Throughout the album, Miller's break up with pop singer Ariana Grande is a common theme of inspiration, as it gave him the chance to experience self-love, healing and psychological growth, similar to the themes shown in his previous album, The Divine Feminine (2016). Lyrically, The Independent stated Miller addresses the acknowledgment of his temper ("Wings") and the pitfalls of fame ("Small Worlds").

Concerning the album's music, Rolling Stone noted Swimming is "a continuation of 2016's The Divine Feminine, with a silky, deep vibe redolent of the L.A. alternative soul scene". The song "So It Goes" has been said to incorporate "muted guitars and a spacey synth drone", while "Wings" has been described as "a spacious neo soul slow burner punctuated by the occasional sigh of a violin". NME wrote that "Ladders" is "a buoyant radio ready bop, which sees his bars skitter across glorious brass lines and earworm riffs". "Jet Fuel" was described as "sluggish, dancehall-inflected trip hop", and "What's the Use" as "synth-funk".

== Release and promotion ==
Swimming was released worldwide by Warner Bros. Records on August 3, 2018, amongst other high-profiled albums, such as Astroworld by Travis Scott and Stay Dangerous by YG. Miller performed "Ladders" on The Late Show with Stephen Colbert on August 13, 2018. The album has no official guest appearances, however it does feature some vocal contributors.

Miller announced The Swimming Tour on July 23, 2018, with Thundercat and JID as his opening acts. The tour was scheduled to have 26 shows across North America, beginning in San Francisco on October 27, 2018, and concluding in Vancouver on December 10, 2018. It was cancelled following Miller's death on September 7, 2018.

=== Singles ===
On May 30, 2018, Miller released the album's first single "Small Worlds", alongside two non-album singles: "Buttons" and "Programs". The album's second single, "Self Care", was released with an accompanying music video on July 13, 2018. The album's third single, "What's the Use?", was released on July 23, 2018.

== Critical reception ==
Swimming ratings
Aggregate scores
Source	Rating
AnyDecentMusic?	7.5/10
Metacritic	78/100
Review scores
Source	Rating
AllMusic	3.5/5 stars
The A.V. Club	B
Financial Times	4/5 stars
The Guardian	4/5 stars
The Independent	4/5 stars
NME	4/5 stars
The Observer	3/5 stars
Pitchfork	7.5/10
Rolling Stone	3.5/5 stars
XXL	4/5

Swimming was met with generally positive reviews. At Metacritic, which assigns a normalized rating out of 100 to reviews from professional publications, the album received an average score of 78, based on 13 reviews. Aggregator AnyDecentMusic? gave it 7.5 out of 10, based on their assessment of the critical consensus.

Meaghan Garvey of The Guardian described Swimming as "a patient record in sound and concept" and "an ambling 13-song journey towards self-acceptance, one that does not end in triumph". Colin McGowan of The A.V. Club complimented the album's production and vocal delivery: "Miller sounds great when he's whining, croaking, stretching syllables like warm mozzarella. Swimming's spare, dreamy production allows him to do a lot of that." Evan Rytlewski of Pitchfork concluded: "An album with nothing but time on its hands and an understanding that healing is a slow, tedious process, Swimming is most engaging when it details the simple things Miller tells himself to keep his spirits up." Kyle Mullin from Exclaim! enjoyed the album, saying, "Whether Miller is singing on those funk-inflected highlights, or rapping on them with a flow that's airtight to their irresistible rhythms, he sounds like a would-be chart-topper, not to mention one of the most versatile and accomplished hip-hop artists working today". For NME, Hannah Mylrea concluded: "Swimming isn't what you would have expected from Miller when he first started dropping mixtapes over a decade ago, but that doesn't matter. This album shows his growth as both an artist, and as a person who's had to deal with the most private aspects of their life being publicly dissected. It's a stellar – if somewhat overlong – artistic statement."

Mosi Reeves of Rolling Stone wrote that Swimming is Miller's "most impactful album of his career", though noted a lack of lyrical depth: "If he could surface those demons with more vivid details and add texture to his lyrics instead of simply using them as a rhythmic device, then he may have a genuinely classic album in him yet. But if Swimming doesn't quite achieve greatness, it connects. You can hear his pain and perseverance, even if he struggles to put it into words." Neil Z. Yeung of AllMusic concluded that "Swimming is ample evidence that Miller can pick up the pieces and continue evolving, his grasp on thoughtful, introspective hip-hop getting stronger by the album". Trey Alston of Highsnobiety concluded that Swimming is "the authentic self-destruction album so many artists have attempted before. Here, Mac is in rare form, chronicling his destruction and rebirth in a way that shows his acknowledgment of the path ahead, but reluctance to step on it without the certainty of companionship at the end. Whether he continues to walk that path is ultimately up to him, but the Mac that's featured on Swimming will find his way from the darkness. In the process, he's given us a beautiful means to mark the turn of his narrative".

=== Rankings ===
Select rankings of Swimming
Publication	List	Rank	Ref.
ABC News	50 Best Albums of 2018	41	
Billboard	50 Best Albums of 2018	14	
Billboard	100 Best Albums of the 2010s	70	
Complex	50 Best Albums of 2018	11	
Highsnobiety	The 25 Best Albums of 2018	24	
The Independent	The 40 Best Albums of 2018	7	
NME	Best Albums of the Year 2018	38	
Noisey	Noisey's 100 Best Albums of 2018	18	
Noisey	The 100 Best Albums of the 2010s	90	
Okayplayer	The Best Albums of 2018	13	
Uproxx	The 50 Best Albums of 2018	50	
Vibe	30 Best Albums of 2018	16	

=== Industry awards ===
Awards and nominations for Swimming
Year	Ceremony	Category	Result	Ref.
2019	Grammy Awards	Best Rap Album	Nominated	

== Commercial performance ==
In Miller's home country of the United States, Swimming debuted at number three on the Billboard 200 with 66,000 album-equivalent units, which included 30,000 pure album sales in its first week. It serves as Miller's fifth consecutive top-five album in the United States.

Following Miller's death on September 7, 2018, the album rose from number 71 to number six on the Billboard 200 with 67,000 album-equivalent units, of which 15,000 were in traditional album sales. Additionally, three tracks from the album entered the US Billboard Hot 100: "Self Care" (number 33), "Hurt Feelings" (number 70), and "Come Back to Earth" (number 91). "Self Care" became Miller's highest-charting song as a lead artist and second-highest entry overall, behind Ariana Grande's "The Way" featuring Miller (2013; number 9). On February 24, 2021, Swimming was certified platinum by the Recording Industry Association of America (RIAA) for combined sales and album-equivalent units of over 1,000,000 units in the United States. It is Miller's first ever album to be certified as platinum.

In Australia, Swimming opened at number 21 on the ARIA Albums Chart, becoming Miller's third top-50 album in the country. In Canada, Swimming debuted at number four on the Canadian Albums Chart. It serves as Miller's fifth consecutive top-10 album in the country. In the United Kingdom, the album debuted at number 37 on the UK Albums Chart, becoming the rapper's first top-40 album on the chart.

== Track listing ==
Swimming track listing
No.	Title	Writer(s)	Producer(s)	Length
1.	"Come Back to Earth"	Malcolm McCormick; Jon Brion; Jeff Gitelman	Brion; Mac Miller; Gitty^{[a]}	2:41
2.	"Hurt Feelings"	McCormick; Jermaine Cole; Paul Williams; Devonte Hynes; Brion; Roger Nichols; O'Donel Levy	J. Cole; Dev Hynes^{[b]}; Brion^{[b]}	4:05
3.	"What's the Use?"	McCormick; David Pimentel; Damon Riddick; Calvin Broadus; Stephen Bruner	Pomo; Dâm-Funk^{[b]}	4:48
4.	"Perfecto"	McCormick; Terry Watson; Brion	Tee-WaTT; Brion^{[b]}	3:35
5.	"Self Care"	McCormick; Dacoury Natche; Eric Dan; Destin Route; Erica Wright; Jahmal Cantero; Hynes; Tyler Mason; Peter Mudge	DJ Dahi; ID Labs; Nostxlgic; Nice Rec^{[b]}	5:45
6.	"Wings"	McCormick; Alejandro Manzano	Alexander Spit	4:10
7.	"Ladders"	McCormick; Pimentel; Gitelman; Brion; Mudge; Kenneth Whalum	Pomo; Brion; Nice Rec^{[b]}	4:47
8.	"Small Worlds"	McCormick; Carter Lang; Donte Perkins; Aja Grant; Brion; John Mayer	Tae Beast; Lang^{[b]}	4:31
9.	"Conversation, Pt. 1"	McCormick; Ronald LaTour; Daveon Jackson; Steven Ellison; Brock Korsan	Cardo; Yung Exclusive; Flying Lotus^{[b]}	3:30
10.	"Dunno"	McCormick; Jonathan Wayne; Brion	Parson Brown; Mac Miller^{[b]}; Brion^{[b]}	3:57
11.	"Jet Fuel"	McCormick; Natche; Steve Lacy; Chris Lane; Philip Thomas; John MacGillivray	DJ Dahi; Lacy; Mac Miller	5:45
12.	"2009"	McCormick; Eric Gabouer; James Harris; Terry Lewis; George Jackson; Chanté Moore; Grant; James Wright; Brion	Eric G	5:47
13.	"So It Goes"	McCormick; Brion	Mac Miller; Brion^{[b]}	5:12
Total length:				58:39

Notes

- ^{^[a]} signifies a co-producer
- ^{^[b]} signifies an additional producer
- "What's the Use?" features additional vocals by Thundercat, Syd, Dâm-Funk and Snoop Dogg
- "Self Care" features additional vocals by Dev Hynes and JID

Samples

- "Hurt Feelings" contains a sample of "Nigerian Knight" by O'Donel Levy, and interpolates "We've Only Just Begun", written by Paul Williams and Roger Nichols.
- "Self Care" contains a sample of "On & On" by Erykah Badu, written by Badu and Jahmal Cantero.
- "Jet Fuel" contains a sample of "The Stopper" (original mix) by Cutty Ranks, written by Ranks, Chris Lane, and John MacGillivray.
- "2009" contains a sample of "Chanté's Got a Man" by Chanté Moore, written by Moore, James Harris, Terry Lewis, George Jackson, and James Wright.

== Personnel ==
Credits adapted from the album's liner notes.

Musicians

- Jeff "Gitty" Gitelman – bass (track 1), guitar (tracks 1, 7)
- Kevin Theodore – wurlitzer (track 1)
- Dâm-Funk – keyboards (track 3), synthesizer (track 3)
- Thundercat – bass (track 3)
- Rob Gueringer – guitar (track 4)
- Rodrigo Mora – congas (track 4), bongo drums (track 9)
- Billy Aukstik – trumpet (track 7)
- Daniel Hardaway – trumpet (tracks 7, 11)
- Fabian Chavez – saxophone (track 7)
- J.P. Floyd – trombone (track 7)
- Kenneth Whalum – saxophone (tracks 7, 9)
- Raymond Mason – trombone (track 7)
- John Mayer – guitar (track 8)
- Jon Brion – organ (track 8), vibraphone (track 12)
- Aja Grant – piano (track 8), string arranger (track 12)
- Steve Lacy – guitar (track 11)
- Frederique Gnaman – guitar (track 12)
- Niles Luther – strings (track 12)
- Pedro Vallejos – strings (track 12)
- Sarah Koenig-Plonskier – strings (track 12)

Technical

- Big Jerm – recording (track 1)
- Vic Wainstein – recording (tracks 2–8, 10, 11, 13)
- Frank Vasquez – recording (track 3)
- Juan Jarpa – recording (track 4)
- E. Dan – recording (track 5)
- Rayvon "Ray Dallas" LaPointe – recording (track 9)
- Andrew Ching – recording (track 12)
- Bea Go – recording (track 12)
- Louis Fisher – recording (track 12)
- Manny Marroquin – mixing (all tracks)
- Chris Galland – mixing engineer (all tracks)
- Robin Florent – mixing engineer assistant (all tracks)
- Scott Desmarais – mixing engineer assistant (all tracks)
- Mike Bozzi – mastering (all tracks)
- Eric Caudieux – additional engineer (tracks 1, 4, 7, 13)
- Ben Sedano – assistant engineer (tracks 5, 10)
- John Armstrong – assistant engineer (tracks 5, 10)

== Charts ==
=== Weekly charts ===
Chart performance for Swimming
Chart (2018–2024)	Peak position
Australian Albums (ARIA)	7
Austrian Albums (Ö3 Austria)	35
Belgian Albums (Ultratop Flanders)	15
Belgian Albums (Ultratop Wallonia)	73
Canadian Albums (Billboard)	4
Czech Albums (ČNS IFPI)	9
Danish Albums (Hitlisten)	13
Dutch Albums (Album Top 100)	13
Finnish Albums (Suomen virallinen lista)	27
German Albums (Offizielle Top 100)	54
Hungarian Albums (MAHASZ)	32
Irish Albums (IRMA)	14
Italian Albums (FIMI)	89
New Zealand Albums (RMNZ)	7
Norwegian Albums (VG-lista)	10
Portuguese Albums (AFP)	152
Slovak Albums (ČNS IFPI)	11
Swedish Albums (Sverigetopplistan)	20
Swiss Albums (Schweizer Hitparade)	23
UK Albums (OCC)	17
UK R&B Albums (OCC)	3
US Billboard 200	3
US Top R&B/Hip-Hop Albums (Billboard)	3

=== Year-end charts ===
2018 year-end chart performance for Swimming
Chart (2018)	Position
US Billboard 200	107
US Top R&B/Hip-Hop Albums (Billboard)	42

2019 year-end chart performance for Swimming
Chart (2019)	Position
New Zealand Albums (RMNZ)	47
US Billboard 200	77
US Top R&B/Hip-Hop Albums (Billboard)	65

2020 year-end chart performance for Swimming
Chart (2020)	Position
US Billboard 200	133

2021 year-end chart performance for Swimming
Chart (2021)	Position
New Zealand Albums (RMNZ)	49
US Billboard 200	102
US Top R&B/Hip-Hop Albums (Billboard)	89

2022 year-end chart performance for Swimming
Chart (2022)	Position
Belgian Albums (Ultratop Flanders)	181
US Billboard 200	154

2023 year-end chart performance for Swimming
Chart (2023)	Position
US Billboard 200	148
US Top R&B/Hip-Hop Albums (Billboard)	99

== Certifications ==
Certifications for Swimming
Region	Certification	Certified units/sales
Denmark (IFPI Danmark)	Platinum	20,000^{‡}
France (SNEP)	Gold	50,000^{‡}
New Zealand (RMNZ)	Platinum	15,000^{‡}
United Kingdom (BPI)	Gold	100,000^{‡}
United States (RIAA)	2× Platinum	2,000,000^{‡}
^{‡} Sales+streaming figures based on certification alone.

== Release history ==
Release dates and formats for Swimming
Region	Date	Label(s)	Format(s)	Ref.
Various	August 3, 2018	REMember Music; Warner Bros.	CD; digital download; streaming	
Various	October 26, 2018	REMember Music; Warner Bros.	Vinyl	
