= The Divine Feminine =

Studio album by Mac Miller
- Released: September 16, 2016
- Recorded: 2015–2016
- Studios: Blast Off Productions; Germano; Jungle City; NightBird; Premier (New York City); EastWest (Hollywood); Encore (Burbank); Sphere (North Hollywood)
- Genres: Alternative hip-hop; jazz rap
- Length: 52:36
- Labels: REMember; Warner Bros.
- Producers: Aja Grant; Dâm-Funk; DJ Dahi; Frank Dukes; ID Labs; JMSN; MusicManTy; Pomo; Tae Beast; Vinylz

Mac Miller chronology
GO:OD AM (2015)	The Divine Feminine (2016)	Swimming (2018)

Singles from The Divine Feminine
- 1. "Dang!" Released: July 28, 2016; 2. "We" Released: August 19, 2016; 3. "My Favorite Part" Released: September 9, 2016

The Divine Feminine is the fourth studio album by American rapper Mac Miller. It was released on September 16, 2016, by REMember Music and Warner Bros. Records. The album features guest appearances from Kendrick Lamar, Anderson .Paak, CeeLo Green, Ty Dolla Sign, and Ariana Grande, among others.

The Divine Feminine was supported by three singles: "Dang!", "We", and "My Favorite Part". The album received generally positive reviews from critics and charted at number two on the US Billboard 200.

== Background and meaning ==
Miller began working on The Divine Feminine immediately after completing his previous studio album GO:OD AM (2015), wanting to explore the emotion of love. He initially intended The Divine Feminine to be an EP, but changed it to a full-length album to allow himself to be more vulnerable. According to Miller, the album was not just about romantic love, but also about learning from women throughout his life and what those experiences meant to him. In May 2018, singer Ariana Grande, Miller's girlfriend at the time of the album's release, denied a claim that the entire album was about her, but said the track "Cinderella" was.

== Release and promotion ==
The Divine Feminine was released worldwide by Warner Bros. Records on September 16, 2016. Miller performed the album on a concert special for Audience Network, which aired on September 30, 2016, and included guest appearances from Ariana Grande and CeeLo Green.

Miller announced The Divine Feminine Tour on August 24, 2016. The tour consisted of 43 shows across North America, beginning in Pittsburgh on September 18, 2016, and ending in Baltimore on December 18, 2016.

A 10th anniversary edition of the album was released on October 2, 2026, featuring three previously unreleased tracks from the original recording sessions.

=== Singles ===
The album's first single, "Dang!", was released on July 28, 2016. The track features a guest appearance from American recording artist Anderson Paak, while the production was handled by Pomo. Its music video was released on August 2, 2016. Miller and Paak performed "Dang!" on The Late Show with Stephen Colbert on September 15, 2016.

The album's second single, "We", was released on August 19, 2016. The track features a guest appearance from American singer-songwriter CeeLo Green, while the production was handled by Frank Dukes.

The album's third single, "My Favorite Part", was released on September 9, 2016. The track features a guest appearance from American singer Ariana Grande, while the production was handled by MusicManTy. An accompanying music video was released on December 12, 2016.

== Critical reception ==
Professional ratings
Aggregate scores
Source	Rating
AnyDecentMusic?	6.5/10
Metacritic	70/100
Review scores
Source	Rating
AllMusic	4/5 stars
Consequence	C
Financial Times	3/5 stars
The Guardian	3/5 stars
HipHopDX	3.8/5
Pitchfork	7.8/10
PopMatters	7/10
Rolling Stone	3/5 stars
Spectrum Culture	3.5/5 stars
XXL	4/5

The Divine Feminine was met with generally positive reviews. At Metacritic, which assigns a normalized rating out of 100 to reviews from professional publications, the album received an average score of 70, based on nine reviews. Aggregator AnyDecentMusic? gave it 6.5 out of 10, based on their assessment of the critical consensus.

Andy Kellman of AllMusic said, "At all times, Miller and his associates are on the same page. Another aspect that makes this the rapper's most fulfilling album is that all the lines about being saved and in awe seem to be expressed with as much ease as the anatomical references, like they're plain facts, not wrenching confessions". Narsimha Chintaluri of HipHopDX said, "The listenability is at an all-time high, but the writing itself is still lackluster". Marshall Gu of PopMatters said, "Mac Miller isn't a good rapper, and he definitely can't carry a note, though he tries to do that a lot on this one. However, he has a vision of what he wanted this album to sound like and then carried it through with all the right producers and features, which is a talent in and of itself". Sheldon Pearce of Pitchfork said, "It's easily his most intoxicating release yet, an odyssey of soulful compositions paring down his expansive and eclectic soundboard from the last few years into something distinctly cozy and pleasant".

Scott Glaysher of XXL said, "All in all, The Divine Feminine is an experiment well done. Mac Miller's creative mind explores the ins and outs of the modern relationship while maintaining a certain level of sophistication that can be considered timeless". Kyle Eustice of Consequence said, "The album could offer some really tender moments, but because they're buried under lyrics that talk about nothing but sex, they're lost. Instead, The Divine Feminine leaves a sour taste behind and entirely misses an opportunity to truly honor the female gender". Ben Beaumont-Thomas of The Guardian said, "Few lyrics are particularly arresting (on "My Favorite Part", new girlfriend Ariana Grande is told that she doesn't know how beautiful she is) and there's some mid-album filler as Miller struggles to add hooks to cosmic G-funk". Keith Harris of Rolling Stone said, "Miller's grown-ass beats clash with his juvenile boasts, so he often ends up sounding like a well-meaning kid who can't stop putting his kicks up on the fancy furniture".

Complex placed The Divine Feminine at number 23 on their "50 Best Albums of 2016" year-end list. XXL ranked it among the best 50 hip hop projects of 2016. In 2022, Rolling Stone placed it at number 173 on their "200 Greatest Hip-Hop Albums of All Time" list.

== Commercial performance ==
In the United States, The Divine Feminine debuted at number two on the Billboard 200, with 48,000 album-equivalent units, 32,000 of which were from traditional album sales.

The Divine Feminine earned 12,000 units in the week following Miller's death on September 7, 2018, allowing the album to re-enter the Billboard 200 at number 50.

== Track listing ==
The Divine Feminine track listing
No.	Title	Writer(s)	Producer(s)	Length
1.	"Congratulations" (featuring Bilal)	Malcolm McCormick; Bilal Oliver; Aja Grant	Grant	4:16
2.	"Dang!" (featuring Anderson .Paak)	McCormick; David Pimentel; Brandon Anderson	Pomo	5:05
3.	"Stay"	McCormick; Keyon Harrold; Alec Gould; Wendy James; Adam Feeney; Eric Dan; Jeremy Kulousek; Zachary Vaughan	ID Labs	5:26
4.	"Skin"	McCormick; Christian Berishaj; Larry Sheffrey; Vic Wainstein	JMSN; Garcia Bros.^{[b]}	4:48
5.	"Cinderella" (featuring Ty Dolla Sign)	McCormick; Grant; Jeff Gitelman; Sunni Colon; Dacoury Natche; Tyrone Griffin, Jr.; Wainstein	DJ Dahi; Grant	8:00
6.	"Planet God Damn" (featuring Njomza)	McCormick; Feeney; Grant; Kaan Gunesberk; Njomza Vitia; Anderson Hernandez	Frank Dukes; Vinylz; Grant^{[b]}	3:12
7.	"Soulmate"	McCormick; Dan; Nikolai Hamedi; Damon Riddick	Dâm-Funk; MisterNeek^{[a]}; Dan^{[b]}	4:33
8.	"We" (featuring CeeLo Green)	McCormick; Feeney; Thomas Callaway; Stephen Bruner	Frank Dukes	5:19
9.	"My Favorite Part" (featuring Ariana Grande)	McCormick; Tyrone Johnson; Ariana Grande	MusicManTy	3:36
10.	"God Is Fair, Sexy Nasty" (featuring Kendrick Lamar)	McCormick; Donte Perkins; Kendrick Duckworth; Grant; Jeremy Rose; Robert Glasper	Tae Beast; Grant^{[b]}	8:21
Total length:				52:36

The Divine Feminine (10th Anniversary) track listing
No.	Title	Writer(s)	Producer(s)	Length
11.	"Grand"	McCormick; Wainstein; Taylor Graves	Mac Miller; Wainstein; Graves^{[b]}	2:06
12.	"Channel 13"	McCormick; Sheldon Young; Wes Singerman	Channel Tres; Miller^{[b]}; Big Jerm^{[b]}	4:24
13.	"Butterflies"	McCormick; Graves; Gitelman	Graves	3:13

Notes

- ^{^[a]} signifies a co-producer
- ^{^[b]} signifies an additional producer
- "Congratulations" features intro vocals by Ariana Grande, Kilo Kish, Chloe Clancy and Paige Montgomery
- "Stay" features additional vocals by Paige Montgomery
- "Skin" features additional vocals by Ella Paige and Njomza
- "We" features additional vocals by Thundercat
- "God Is Fair, Sexy Nasty" features outro vocals by Nanny, Miller's grandmother

Samples

- "Stay" contains a sample of "Slowjizam" by Adam Feeney.
- "Soulmate" contains an audio clip from the 1997 film Good Will Hunting.
- "God is Fair, Sexy Nasty" contains a sample of "Come" by Zodiac (Jeremy Rose).

== Personnel ==
Credits adapted from the album's liner notes.

Vocals

- Mac Miller – primary artist
- Bilal – featured artist (track 1)
- Anderson .Paak – featured artist (track 2)
- Ty Dolla Sign – featured artist (track 5)
- Njomza – featured artist (track 6), additional vocals (track 4)
- CeeLo Green – featured artist (track 8)
- Ariana Grande – featured artist (track 9), intro vocals (track 1)
- Kendrick Lamar – featured artist (track 10)
- Chloe Clancy – intro vocals (track 1)
- Kilo Kish – intro vocals (track 1)
- Paige Montgomery – intro vocals (track 1), additional vocals (track 3)
- Ella Paige – additional vocals (track 4)
- Thundercat – additional vocals (track 8)
- Nanny – outro vocals (track 10)

Instrumentation

- Drew Forde – strings (track 1)
- Lee Jeon – strings (track 1)
- Nathan Chan – strings (track 1)
- David Pimentel – bass, drums, keyboard (track 2)
- Braxton Cook – horn (track 2)
- Enrique Sanchez – horn (track 2)
- Jeffery Oliver – horn (track 2)
- Julian Lee – horn (track 2)
- Keyon Harrold – trumpet (track 3)
- Jeff Gitelman – bass, electric guitar (track 5)
- Sunni Colón – guitar (track 5)
- Joshua Valle – guitar (track 10)
- Robert Glasper – piano (track 10)

Production

- Mac Miller – executive production
- Aja Grant – production (tracks 1, 5), additional production (tracks 6, 10)
- Pomo – production (track 2)
- ID Labs – production (track 3)
- JMSN – production (track 4)
- DJ Dahi – production (track 5)
- Frank Dukes – production (tracks 6, 8)
- Vinylz – production (track 6)
- Dâm-Funk – production (track 7)
- MusicManTy – production (track 9)
- Tae Beast – production (track 10)
- MisterNeek – co-production (track 7)
- Garcia Bros. – additional production (track 4)
- Eric Dan – additional production (track 7)

Technical

- Derek Ali – mixing (all tracks)
- Chris Gehringer – mastering (all tracks)
- Brendan Silas Parry – engineering assistant (track 2)
- Derlis Chavarria – engineering assistant (tracks 3, 5–7)
- Sean Madden – engineering assistant (track 4)
- Nicholas Cavalieri – recording (tracks 1–2, 5, 7, 10)
- Zeke Mishanec – recording (track 2)
- Carlos Vives – recording (tracks 3, 5–7)
- Vic Wainstein – recording (tracks 4, 8–9), additional engineering (track 6)
- Kenta Yonesaka – recording (track 10)

== Charts ==
=== Weekly charts ===
Weekly chart performance
Chart (2016)	Peak position
Australian Albums (ARIA)	13
Belgian Albums (Ultratop Flanders)	38
Belgian Albums (Ultratop Wallonia)	156
Canadian Albums (Billboard)	6
Dutch Albums (Album Top 100)	30
French Albums (SNEP)	64
German Albums (Offizielle Top 100)	67
Irish Albums (IRMA)	97
New Zealand Albums (RMNZ)	17
Swiss Albums (Schweizer Hitparade)	35
UK Albums (Official Charts)	59
UK R&B Albums (Official Charts)	8
US Billboard 200	2
US Top R&B/Hip-Hop Albums (Billboard)	1

Weekly chart performance
Chart (2023)	Peak position
Scottish Albums (Official Charts)	42
UK R&B Albums (Official Charts)	5

Weekly chart performance
Chart (2026)	Peak position
Dutch Albums (Album Top 100)	18
German Pop Albums (Offizielle Top 100)	19
Hungarian Physical Albums (MAHASZ)	12
Hungarian Vinyl Albums (MAHASZ)	5
Lithuanian Albums (AGATA)	88
Polish Albums (ZPAV)	82
Portuguese Streaming Albums (AFP)	168
Scottish Albums (Official Charts)	22
UK R&B Albums (Official Charts)	2

=== Year-end charts ===
Year-end chart performance
Chart (2016)	Position
US Top R&B/Hip-Hop Albums (Billboard)	58

== Certifications ==
Certifications for The Divine Feminine
Region	Certification	Certified units/sales
Denmark (IFPI Danmark)	Gold	10,000^{‡}
France (SNEP)	Gold	50,000^{‡}
United Kingdom (BPI)	Silver	60,000^{‡}
United States (RIAA)	Platinum	1,000,000^{‡}
^{‡} Sales+streaming figures based on certification alone.
