= Tyga discography =

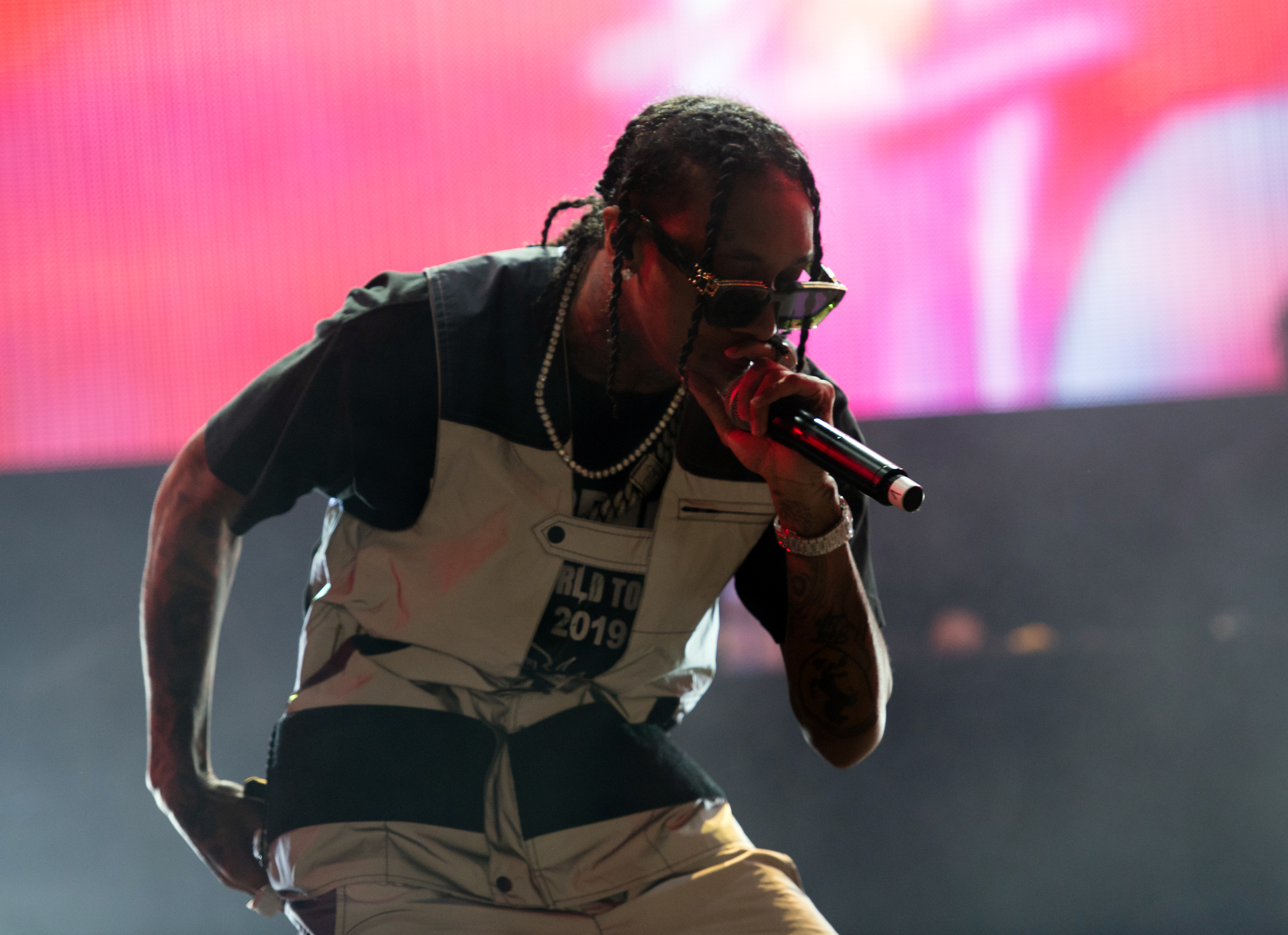
- Tyga performing in July 2019
- Studio albums: 9
- Singles: 74
- Music videos: 46
- Collaborative albums: 2
- Mixtapes: 21

The discography of American rapper Tyga consists of nine studio albums, three compilation albums, twenty one mixtapes, seventy-four singles (including thirty-four as a featured artist) and forty-six music videos. In 2008, Tyga released his first studio album, No Introduction, on the record label Decaydance Records. The album was led by the single "Coconut Juice" (featuring Travie McCoy), which peaked at number 94 on the US Billboard Hot 100 and marked Tyga's first song to enter on the chart. In 2010, Tyga and Virginia singer Chris Brown released the collaborative mixtape Fan of a Fan (2010), which included their hit single "Deuces", which peaked at number 14 on the Billboard Hot 100 and became Tyga's first song to chart on the US Hot R&B/Hip-Hop Songs chart, where it peaked atop.

The release of Tyga's second studio album (and his first to be released on the record label Young Money Entertainment), Careless World: Rise of the Last King (2012), was preceded by the release of the singles "Far Away", "Still Got It", "Rack City" and "Faded", with all four appearing on the Billboard Hot 100. "Rack City" saw Tyga's furthest commercial success, peaking within the top ten—at number seven—of the Billboard Hot 100 while also charting in Australia, Canada and the United Kingdom. Following several delays to its release date, Careless World: Rise of the Last King debuted at number four on the US Billboard 200 and atop both the US Top R&B/Hip-Hop Albums and Top Rap Albums charts. His third studio album, Hotel California, was released on April 9, 2013.

As of February 2017, Tyga has sold 600,000 albums and 12.2 million digital singles as a solo artist. His 2018 single, "Taste" became his second highest-charting song on the Billboard Hot 10—at number eight.

== Albums ==
=== Studio albums ===
List of studio albums, with selected chart positions
Title	Album details	Peak chart positions										Certifications
Title	Album details	US	US R&B	US Rap	AUS	CAN	FRA	GER	NZ	SWI	UK	Certifications
No Introduction	Released: June 10, 2008; Label: Decaydance; Format: CD, digital download	112	25	9	—	—	—	—	—	—	—	
Careless World: Rise of the Last King	Released: February 21, 2012; Label: Young Money, Cash Money, Republic; Format: CD, LP, digital download	4	1	1	—	6	—	—	—	—	56	RIAA: Platinum
Hotel California	Released: April 9, 2013; Label: Young Money, Cash Money, Republic; Format: CD, digital download	7	2	1	—	20	121	37	—	75	55	RIAA: Gold
The Gold Album: 18th Dynasty	Released: June 23, 2015; Label: Last Kings; Format: LP, digital download, streaming	—	24	18	—	—	—	—	—	—	—	
BitchImTheShit2	Released: July 21, 2017; Label: Last Kings, Empire; Format: LP, digital download, streaming	139	— (Note: BitchImTheShit2 did not enter the Top R&B/Hip-Hop Albums chart, but peaked at number 30 on the US R&B/Hip-Hop Album Sales chart.)	— (Note: BitchImTheShit2 did not enter the Top Rap Albums chart, but peaked at number 21 on the US Rap Album Sales chart.)	—	—	—	—	— (Note: BitchImTheShit2 did not enter did not enter the NZ Top 40 Albums Chart, but peaked at number eight on the NZ Heatseeker Albums Chart.)	—	—	
Kyoto	Released: February 16, 2018; Label: Last Kings, Empire; Format: CD, digital download, streaming	—	— (Note: Kyoto did not enter the Top R&B/Hip-Hop Albums chart, but peaked at number 39 on the US R&B/Hip-Hop Album Sales chart.)	—	—	—	—	—	— (Note: Kyoto did not enter the NZ Top 40 Albums Chart, but peaked at number two on the NZ Heatseeker Albums Chart.)	—	—	
Legendary	Released: June 7, 2019; Label: Last Kings, Empire; Format: CD, digital download, streaming	17	7	6	12	7	93	—	17	17	43	RIAA: Platinum
NSFW	Released: February 7, 2025; Label: Last Kings, Empire; Format: CD, digital download, streaming	—	—	—	—	—	—	—	—	—	—	
Starface	Released: July 31, 2026; Label: Last Kings, Empire; Format: Digital download, streaming	—	—	—	—	—	—	—	—	—	—	
"—" denotes a recording that did not chart.

=== Collaboration albums ===
List of albums, with selected chart positions, sales figures and certifications
Title	Album details	Peak chart positions										Sales	Certifications
Title	Album details	US	US R&B	AUS	FRA	GER	IRE	NLD	NZ	SWI	UK	Sales	Certifications
Fan of a Fan: The Album (with Chris Brown)	Released: February 24, 2015; Label: RCA, Young Money, Cash Money; Format: CD, digital download	7	3	3	28	14	31	30	9	6	7	US: 460,000	RIAA: Gold; ARIA: Gold; BPI: Gold; IFPI DEN: Gold
Hit Me When U Leave the Klub: The Playlist (with YG)	Released: September 29, 2023; Label: Last Kings, 4Hunnid, Empire; Format: Digital download, streaming	101	44	—	—	—	—	—	—	—	—		

=== Mixtapes ===
List of mixtapes with selected details
Title	Host	Released	Label	Format
Young on Probation	DJ Rush	2007	Self-Released	Digital Download
No Introduction – The Series: April 10	DJ Nice and PDA	April 10, 2008	Self-Released	Digital Download
No Introduction – The Series: May 10	DJ Nice and PDA	May 10, 2008	Self-Released	Digital Download
Slaughter House	DJ Nice and Legend	August 13, 2008	Self-Released	Digital Download
The Free Album	Clinton Sparks	January 12, 2009	Self-Released	Digital Download
Outraged & Underage	DJ Ill Will and DJ Rockstar	March 4, 2009	Self-Released	Digital Download
The Potential	-	June 9, 2009	Deep	Digital Download
Black Thoughts	DJ Ill Will and DJ Rockstar	November 19, 2009	Self-Released	Digital Download
Fan of a Fan (with Chris Brown)	DJ Ill Will and DJ Rockstar	May 16, 2010	Self-Released	Digital Download
Well Done	DJ Drama	November 8, 2010	Gangsta Grillz	Digital Download
Black Thoughts 2	DJ Ill Will and DJ Rockstar	April 12, 2011	Self-Released	Digital Download
Well Done (Remastered) [No DJ version]	-	July 17, 2011	Self-Released	Digital Download
Well Done 2	-	July 18, 2011	Self-Released	Digital Download
#BitchImTheShit	-	December 5, 2011	Self-Released	Digital Download
Well Done 3	-	August 19, 2012	Self-Released	Digital Download
187	-	November 30, 2012	Self-Released	Digital Download
Well Done 4	-	December 17, 2013	Self-Released	Digital Download
Fuk Wat They Talkin Bout	-	August 24, 2015	Self-Released	Digital Download
Rawwest Nigga Alive	-	January 15, 2016	Self-Released	Digital Download
Bugatti Raww	-	October 23, 2017	Last Kings	Digital Download
Well Done Fever	DJ Drama	December 25, 2020	Last Kings, Gangsta Grillz	Digital Download

== Singles ==
=== As lead artist ===
List of singles as lead artist, with selected chart positions and certifications, showing year released and album name
Title	Year	Peak chart positions										Certifications	Album
Title	Year	US	US R&B /HH	US Rap	AUS	AUT	CAN	FRA	GER	SWI	UK	Certifications	Album
"Diamond Life" (featuring Patty Crash)	2007	—	—	—	—	—	—	—	—	—	—		No Introduction
"Coconut Juice" (featuring Travis McCoy)	2008	94	—	—	—	—	—	—	—	—	—		No Introduction
"AIM"	2009	—	—	—	—	—	—	—	—	—	—		No Introduction
"I'm on It" (featuring Lil Wayne)	2010	— (Note: "I'm on It" did not enter the Billboard Hot 100, but peaked at number 12 on the Bubbling Under Hot 100 chart, which acts as an extension to the Hot 100.)	—	—	—	—	—	—	—	—	—		Fan of a Fan
"Far Away" (featuring Chris Richardson)	2011	86	93	16	—	—	—	—	—	—	—	RIAA: Gold	Careless World: Rise of the Last King
"Still Got It" (featuring Drake)	2011	89	70	—	—	—	—	—	—	—	—		Careless World: Rise of the Last King
"Rack City"	2011	7	5	2	74	—	53	150	60	—	39	RIAA: 5× Platinum; ARIA: Gold; BPI: Gold; BVMI: Gold	Careless World: Rise of the Last King
"Faded" (featuring Lil Wayne)	2012	33	19	7	—	—	—	—	—	—	—	RIAA: 3× Platinum	Careless World: Rise of the Last King
"Make It Nasty"	2012	91	77	23	—	—	—	—	—	—	—	RIAA: Platinum	Careless World: Rise of the Last King
"Do My Dance" (featuring 2 Chainz)	2012	— (Note: "Do My Dance" did not enter the Billboard Hot 100, but peaked at number 11 on the Bubbling Under Hot 100 Singles chart, which acts as an extension to the Hot 100.)	32	22	—	—	—	—	—	—	—	RIAA: Gold	Well Done 3
"Dope" (featuring Rick Ross)	2013	68	19	15	—	—	72	—	—	—	178	RIAA: Gold	Hotel California
"For the Road" (featuring Chris Brown)	2013	— (Note: "For the Road" did not enter the Billboard Hot 100, but peaked at number 15 on the Bubbling Under Hot 100 Singles chart, which acts as an extension to the Hot 100.)	39	—	—	—	—	—	—	—	—		Hotel California
"Show You" (featuring Future)	2013	—	55	—	—	—	—	—	—	—	—		Hotel California
"Throw It Up" (with DJ Mustard)	2013	—	—	—	—	—	—	—	—	—	—		Well Done 4
"Wait for a Minute" (with Justin Bieber)	2013	68	24	—	—	50	47	103	43	43	41	RIAA: Gold	Non-album single
"Wake Up In It" (with Mally Mall featuring Sean Kingston, French Montana and Pusha T)	2013	—	—	—	—	—	—	—	—	—	—		Well Done 4
"Young Kobe"	2014	—	—	—	—	—	—	—	—	—	—		Well Done 4
"Hookah" (featuring Young Thug)	2014	85	24	17	—	—	—	188	—	—	—	RIAA: Platinum; BPI: Silver	Non-album single
"Ayo" (with Chris Brown)	2015	21	7	—	32	58	65	32	23	43	6	RIAA: 3× Platinum; ARIA: 2× Platinum; IFPI DEN: Platinum; BPI: 2× Platinum; FIMI: Gold	Fan of a Fan: The Album
"Bitches N Marijuana" (with Chris Brown featuring Schoolboy Q)	2015	— (Note: "Bitches N Marijuana" did not enter the Billboard Hot 100, but peaked at number three on the Bubbling Under Hot 100 Singles chart, which acts as an extension to the Hot 100.)	33	20	49	—	—	139	50	—	60	RIAA: Gold; ARIA: Platinum; BPI: Silver	Fan of a Fan: The Album
"Ride Out" (with Kid Ink, Wale, YG and Rich Homie Quan)	2015	70	22	14	44	26	48	51	21	25	70	RIAA: Gold	Furious 7: Original Motion Picture Soundtrack
"Hollywood Niggaz"	2015	—	—	—	—	—	—	—	—	—	—		The Gold Album: 18th Dynasty
"Pleaser" (featuring Boosie Badazz)	2015	—	—	—	—	—	—	—	—	—	—		The Gold Album: 18th Dynasty
"Stimulated"	2015	— (Note: "Stimulated" did not enter the Billboard Hot 100, but peaked at number three on the Bubbling Under Hot 100 Singles chart, which acts as an extension to the Hot 100.)	41	—	—	—	—	—	—	—	—		Fuk Wat They Talkin Bout
"Dope'd Up"	2015	—	—	—	—	—	—	—	—	—	—		Rawwest Nigga Alive
"Happy Birthday"	2015	—	—	—	—	—	—	—	—	—	—		Rawwest Nigga Alive
"Baller Alert" (featuring 2 Chainz and Rick Ross)	2015	—	—	—	—	—	—	—	—	—	—		Rawwest Nigga Alive
"Cash Money"	2016	—	—	—	—	—	—	—	—	—	—		Non-album single
"1 of 1"	2016	—	—	—	—	—	—	—	—	—	—		BitchImTheShit2
"Feel Me" (featuring Kanye West)	2017	— (Note: "Feel Me" did not enter the Billboard Hot 100, but peaked at number four on the Bubbling Under Hot 100 Singles chart, which acts as an extension to the Hot 100.)	48	—	—	—	90	—	—	—	—		BitchImTheShit2
"100's" (featuring Chief Keef and AE)	2017	—	—	—	—	—	—	—	—	—	—		BitchImTheShit2
"Act Ghetto" (featuring Lil Wayne)	2017	—	—	—	—	—	—	—	—	—	—		Non-album single
"Eyes Closed"	2017	—	—	—	—	—	—	—	—	—	—		BitchImTheShit2
"Playboy" (featuring Vince Staples)	2017	—	—	—	—	—	—	—	—	—	—		BitchImTheShit2
"Flossin" (featuring King)	2017	—	—	—	—	—	—	—	—	—	—		BitchImTheShit2
"Move to L.A." (featuring Ty Dolla Sign)	2017	—	—	—	—	—	—	—	—	—	—		BitchImTheShit2
"My Way"	2017	—	—	—	—	—	—	—	—	—	—		Non-album single
"Boss Up"	2017	—	—	—	—	—	—	—	—	—	—		Kyoto
"Temperature"	2017	—	—	—	—	—	—	—	—	—	—		Kyoto
"Taste" (featuring Offset)	2018	8	7	6	—	21	9	89	—	18	5	RIAA: Diamond; BPI: 2× Platinum; FIMI: Platinum; RMNZ: 2× Platinum; SNEP: Gold	Legendary
"Swish"	2018	— (Note: "Swish" did not enter the Billboard Hot 100, but peaked at number two on the Bubbling Under Hot 100 Singles chart, which acts as an extension to the Hot 100.)	44	—	—	—	58	—	—	76	47	RIAA: Platinum; BPI: Silver	Legendary
"Dip" (featuring Nicki Minaj)	2018	63	31	—	—	—	51	—	—	84	62	RIAA: Platinum; BPI: Silver	Legendary
"Floss in the Bank"	2019	—	—	—	—	—	—	—	—	—	—		Legendary
"Girls Have Fun" (featuring G-Eazy and Rich the Kid)	2019	—	—	—	97	—	95	—	—	—	—	RIAA: Gold	Legendary
"Goddamn" (featuring A Boogie wit da Hoodie on the album version)	2019	—	—	—	90	—	83	—	—	95	96	RIAA: Gold	Legendary
"Light It Up" (with Marshmello and Chris Brown)	2019	90	35	—	60	—	75	—	—	78	55	MC: Gold; RMNZ: Platinum	Non-album single
"Haute" (featuring J Balvin and Chris Brown)	2019	— (Note: "Haute" did not enter the Billboard Hot 100, but peaked at number one on the Bubbling Under Hot 100 chart, which acts as an extension to the Hot 100.)	42	—	50	58	55	55	—	23	66		Legendary
"Loco Contigo" (with DJ Snake and J Balvin)	2019	95	—	—	—	—	84	—	3	2	87	RIAA: Platinum; ARIA: Platinum; BPI: Silver; BVMI: Platinum; SNEP: Diamond; MC: Platinum	Carte Blanche
"Juicy" (Remix) (with Doja Cat)	2019	41	18	—	68	—	57	—	—	—	80	RIAA: 2× Platinum; BPI: Gold; MC: Gold	Hot Pink
"Uno (Remix)" (with Ambjaay and Lil Pump)	2019	—	—	—	—	—	—	—	—	—	—		Non-album singles
"Mamacita" (with YG and Santana)	2019	— (Note: "Mamacita" did not enter the Billboard Hot 100, but peaked at number 14 on the Bubbling Under Hot 100 chart, which acts as an extension to the Hot 100.)	—	—	—	—	84	—	—	67	14		Non-album singles
"Ayy Macarena"	2019	— (Note: "Ayy Macarena" did not enter the Billboard Hot 100, but peaked at number three on the Bubbling Under Hot 100 chart, which acts as an extension to the Hot 100.)	42	—	62	13	48	108	9	9	—	RIAA: Gold; BVMI: Gold	Non-album singles
"Freak" (with Megan Thee Stallion)	2020	— (Note: "Freak" did not enter the Billboard Hot 100, but peaked at number 20 on the Bubbling Under Hot 100 chart, which acts as an extension to the Hot 100.)	—	—	—	—	—	—	—	—	—		Non-album singles
"Like It Is" (with Kygo and Zara Larsson)	2020	— (Note: "Like It Is" did not enter the Billboard Hot 100, but peaked at number 13 on the Bubbling Under Hot 100 chart.)	—	—	78	37	—	167	41	9	49	BPI: Silver; MC: Platinum	Golden Hour
"Bored in the House" (with Curtis Roach)	2020	—	—	—	—	—	—	—	—	—	—		Non-album singles
"Vacation"	2020	— (Note: "Vacation" did not enter the Billboard Hot 100, but peaked at number 23 on the Bubbling Under Hot 100 chart.)	—	—	—	—	—	—	—	—	—		Non-album singles
"Ibiza"	2020	—	—	—	—	—	—	—	—	—	—		Non-album singles
"Vida Loca" (with Black Eyed Peas and Nicky Jam)	2020	—	—	—	—	—	—	—	—	—	—		Translation
"Money Mouf" (featuring Saweetie and YG)	2020	—	—	—	—	—	—	—	—	—	—		Non-album singles
"Latina" (Remix) (with Reykon and Becky G featuring Maluma)	2020	—	—	—	—	—	—	—	—	—	—		Non-album singles
"Krabby Step" (with Swae Lee and Lil Mosey)	2020	—	—	—	—	—	—	—	—	—	—		Sponge on the Run
"Chosen" (with Blxst featuring Ty Dolla Sign)	2021	51	11	6	-	-	94	-	-	-	42	RIAA: Platinum; ARIA: 2× Platinum; BPI: Gold	No Love Lost
"Sip It" (with Iggy Azalea)	2021	—	—	—	—	—	—	—	—	—	—		The End of an Era (Deluxe)
"Splash" (featuring Moneybagg Yo)	2021	—	—	—	—	—	—	—	—	—	—		Non-album singles
"Mrs. Bubblegum"	2021	—	—	—	—	—	—	—	—	—	—		Non-album singles
"Lift Me Up"	2021	—	—	—	—	—	—	—	—	—	—		Non-album singles
"Tell Santa"	2021	—	—	—	—	—	—	—	—	—	—		Non-album singles
"Freaky Deaky" (with Doja Cat)	2022	43	11	8	29	—	44	—	—	—	35	RIAA: Platinum; BPI: Silver	Non-album singles
"Lifetime"	2022	—	—	—	—	—	—	—	—	—	—		Non-album singles
"Sheikh Talk"	2022	—	—	—	—	—	—	—	—	—	—		Non-album singles
"Ay Caramba"	2022	—	—	—	—	—	—	—	—	—	—		Non-album singles
"Sunshine" (featuring Jhene Aiko and Pop Smoke)	2022	— (Note: "Sunshine" did not enter the Billboard Hot 100, but peaked at number seven on the Bubbling Under Hot 100 chart.)	44	—	—	—	—	—	—	—	-	RIAA: Gold	Non-album singles
"Fantastic"	2022	—	—	—	—	—	—	—	—	—	—		Non-album singles
"Booty Dancer"	2022	—	—	—	—	—	—	—	—	—	—		Non-album singles
"Nasty" (with Chris Brown)	2022	—	—	—	—	—	—	—	—	—	—		Non-album singles
"Day One"	2023	—	—	—	—	—	—	—	—	—	—		Non-album singles
"West Coast Weekend" (with YG and Blxst)	2023	—	—	—	—	—	—	—	—	—	—		Hit Me When U Leave the Klub: The Playlist
"Platinum" (with YG)	2023	—	—	—	—	—	—	—	—	—	—		Hit Me When U Leave the Klub: The Playlist
"Birthday" (with Saweetie and YG)	2023	—	—	—	—	—	—	—	—	—	—		Non-album single
"Party T1m3" (with YG)	2023	—	—	—	—	—	—	—	—	—	—		Hit Me When U Leave the Klub: The Playlist
"Soak City" (with 310babii and Blueface featuring Mustard, OhGeesy and BlueBucksClan)	2023	—	—	—	—	—	—	—	—	—	—		Non-album singles
"Bops Goin Brazy"	2023	—	—	—	—	—	—	—	—	—	—		Non-album singles
"Brand New" (with YG and Lil Wayne)	2023	— (Note: "Brand New" did not enter the Billboard Hot 100, but peaked at number one on the Bubbling Under Hot 100 chart.)	34	—	—	—	—	—	—	—	—		Hit Me When U Leave the Klub: The Playlist
"Sensei"	2024	—	—	—	—	—	—	—	—	—	—		Non-album singles
"Hello B*tch"	2024	—	—	—	—	—	—	—	—	—	—		Non-album singles
"Uh Huh" (with 310babii)	2024	—	—	—	—	—	—	—	—	—	—		Non-album singles
"No Question" (with Sabrina Claudio)	2024	—	—	—	—	—	—	—	—	—	—		Non-album singles
"Spooky"	2024	—	—	—	—	—	—	—	—	—	—		Non-album singles
"Don't Be Fooled"	2024	—	—	—	—	—	—	—	—	—	—		Non-album singles
"Mmphh"	2024	—	—	—	—	—	—	—	—	—	—		Non-album singles
"Slave"	2024	—	—	—	—	—	—	—	—	—	—		NSFW
"Ooweee"	2025	—	—	—	—	—	—	—	—	—	—		Non-album single
"Pop It Off" (with Lil Wayne)	2025	—	—	—	—	—	—	—	—	—	—		NSFW
"—" denotes a recording that did not chart.

=== As featured artist ===
List of singles as featured artist, with selected chart positions and certifications, showing year released and album name
Title	Year	Peak chart positions							Certifications	Album
Title	Year	US	US R&B /HH	US Rap	CAN	IRL	NZ	UK	Certifications	Album
"Deuces" (Chris Brown featuring Tyga and Kevin McCall)	2010	14	1	—	—	—	23	68	RIAA: 3× Platinum; BPI: Silver	F.A.M.E.
"Loyalty" (Birdman featuring Lil Wayne and Tyga)	2010	— (Note: "Loyalty" did not enter the Billboard Hot 100, but peaked at number seven on the Bubbling Under Hot 100 Singles chart, which acts as an extension to the Hot 100.)	61	25	—	—	—	—		Non-album singles
"Heavy" (CJ Hilton featuring Fat Joe and Tyga)	2010	—	—	—	—	—	—	—		Non-album singles
"Popular" (Trai'D featuring Tyga)	2011	—	— (Note: "Powerful" did not enter the Hot R&B/Hip-Hop Songs, but peaked at number 14 on the Bubbling Under R&B/Hip-Hop Singles chart, which acts as an extension to the Hot R&B/Hip-Hop Songs chart.)	—	—	—	—	—		Popularity Contest 1.5
"Keisha" (Jawan Harris featuring Tyga)	2011	—	91	—	—	—	—	—		Non-album single
"Burn Me Down" (Gilbere Forte featuring Tyga and Raak)	2011	—	—	—	—	—	—	—		Some Dreams Never Sleep
"Ayy Ladies" (Travis Porter featuring Tyga)	2012	53	9	7	—	—	—	—	RIAA: Gold	From Day 1
"Snitches Ain't..." (YG featuring Tyga, Snoop Dogg and Nipsey Hussle)	2012	100	—	—	—	—	—	—		Just Re'd Up
"Get Low" (Waka Flocka Flame featuring Nicki Minaj, Tyga and Flo Rida)	2012	72	67	25	58	—	—	—		Triple F Life: Friends, Fans & Family
"Shake That Jelly" (Billy Wes featuring Tyga)	2012	—	—	—	—	—	—	—		Think Like a Man soundtrack
"I Love Girls" (Pleasure P featuring Tyga)	2012	—	65	—	—	—	—	—		Non-album single
"Get Her Tho" (D-Lo featuring Tyga)	2012	—	—	—	—	—	—	—		Keep It on the D-Lo
"Live It Up" (Tulisa featuring Tyga)	2012	—	—	—	—	41	—	11		The Female Boss
"Gold" (Neon Hitch featuring Tyga)	2012	—	—	—	—	—	—	—		Non-album singles
"Joy & Pain" (Chris Richardson featuring Tyga)	2012	—	—	—	—	—	—	—		Non-album singles
"Celebration" (Game featuring Chris Brown, Tyga, Wiz Khalifa and Lil Wayne)	2012	81	24	19	—	—	—	—		Jesus Piece
"AKUP" (LoveRance featuring Tyga and Problem)	2012	—	—	—	—	—	—	—		Non-album single
"So Many Girls" (DJ Drama featuring Tyga, Wale and Roscoe Dash)	2013	90	30	21	—	—	—	—		Quality Street Music
"Reason to Hate" (DJ Felli Fel featuring Ne-Yo, Tyga and Wiz Khalifa)	2013	—	58	—	—	—	—	—		Non-album single
"Bubble Butt" (Major Lazer featuring Bruno Mars, Tyga and Mystic)	2013	56	17	13	—	—	—	196	RIAA: Gold	Free the Universe
"Iz U Down" (Kid Ink featuring Tyga)	2013	—	57	—	—	—	—	—		My Own Lane
"Loyal" (Chris Brown featuring Lil Wayne and Tyga)	2014	9	4	—	71	71	19	10	RIAA: 6× Platinum; ARIA: 3× Platinum; BPI: 2× Platinum; IFPI DEN: Gold	X
"Lemonade" (Danity Kane featuring Tyga)	2014	—	—	—	—	—	—	—		DK3
"Bend Ova" (Lil Jon featuring Tyga)	2014	92	—	19	53	—	40	—		Non-album singles
"Collide" (Justine Skye featuring Tyga)	2014	—	38	—	—	—	—	—	BPI: Gold; RIAA: Gold	Non-album singles
"Now & Later" (Chief Keef featuring Tyga)	2014	—	—	—	—	—	—	—		Thot Breaker
"Work for It" (Poo Bear featuring Tyga)	2014	—	—	—	—	—	—	—		Non-album singles
"Do It Again" (Pia Mia featuring Chris Brown and Tyga)	2015	71	—	—	70	52	10	8	RIAA: Platinum; ARIA: Platinum; IFPI DEN: Gold; IFPI SWE: Gold; BPI: 2× Platinum; RMNZ: Platinum; ZPAV: Gold	Non-album singles
"100" (Travis Barker featuring Kid Ink, Ty Dolla $ign, Iamsu! and Tyga)	2015	—	—	—	—	—	—	—		Non-album singles
"I Might Go Lesbian" (Manika featuring Tyga)	2015	—	—	—	—	—	—	—		Non-album singles
"Kream" (Iggy Azalea featuring Tyga)	2018	96	—	—	54	96	—	—	RIAA: Platinum	Survive the Summer
"Spray" (Sneakk featuring Tyga and YG)	2018	—	—	—	—	—	—	—		Undisputed
"Low Key" (Ally Brooke featuring Tyga)	2019	— (Note: "Low Key" did not enter the Billboard Hot 100, but peaked at number 17 on the Bubbling Under Hot 100 Singles chart, which acts as an extension to the Hot 100.)	—	—	—	—	—	—		Non-album single
"Go Loko" (YG featuring Tyga and Jon Z)	2019	49	18	16	38	—	—	—	RIAA: 2× Platinum	4Real 4Real
"Broke Leg" (Tory Lanez featuring Quavo and Tyga)	2019	—	—	—	70	—	—	—		Love Me Now? Reloaded
"Still Be Friends" (G-Eazy featuring Tory Lanez and Tyga)	2020	—	—	—	67	—	—	—	RIAA: Gold	These Things Happen Too (Deluxe)
"Contact" (Wiz Khalifa featuring Tyga)	2020	—	—	—	—	—	—	—		The Saga of Wiz Khalifa
"Fuego Del Calor" (Scott Storch featuring Ozuna and Tyga)	2020	—	—	—	—	—	—	—		Non-album singles
"California" (Usher featuring Tyga)	2020	—	—	—	—	—	—	—		Non-album singles
"Desce Pro Play (Pa Pa Pa)" (Mc Zaac featuring Anitta and Tyga)	2020	—	—	—	—	—	—	—		Non-album singles
"Money Now" (Kyle featuring Tyga and Johnny Yukon)	2020	—	—	—	—	—	—	—		See You When I Am Famous
"Sweet & Sour" (Jawsh 685 featuring Lauv and Tyga)	2020	—	—	—	—	—	8	—		Non-album single
"Dennis Rodman" (ASAP Ferg featuring Tyga)	2020	—	—	—	—	—	—	—		Floor Seats II
"Main One" (Mario and Lil Wayne featuring Tyga)	2023	―	―	—	—	—	—	—		Non-album single
"Dance With Me" (Ciara featuring Tyga)	2025	―	―	—	—	—	—	—		CiCi
"—" denotes a recording that did not chart.

=== Promotional singles ===
List of promotional singles, with selected chart positions and certifications, showing year released and album name
Title	Year	Peak chart positions			Certifications	Album
Title	Year	US	US R&B	US Rap	Certifications	Album
"Cali Love"	2009	—	—	—		Outraged & Underage
"Molly" (featuring Cedric Gervais, Wiz Khalifa and Mally Mall)	2013	66	22	16	RIAA: Platinum	Hotel California
"Like Whaaat" (Remix) (Problem featuring Wiz Khalifa, Tyga, Chris Brown and Master P)	2013	—	—	—		Non-album single
"Senile" (Young Money featuring Tyga, Nicki Minaj and Lil Wayne)	2014	—	50	—		Young Money: Rise of an Empire
"We Don't Die"	2014	—	—	—		Non-album singles
"Real Deal"	2014	—	—	—		Non-album singles
"Erryday"	2014	—	—	—		Non-album singles
"40 Mill"	2014	—	—	—		Non-album singles
"Make It Work"	2014	—	—	—		Non-album singles
"Gone Too Far"	2016	—	—	—		BitchImTheShit2
"Trap Pussy"	2016	—	—	—		Non-album singles
"Gucci Snakes" (featuring Desiigner)	2016	—	—	—		Non-album singles
"Swap Meet"	2018	—	—	—		Non-album singles
"Dip" (solo version)	2018	63	31	—		Non-album singles
"Wow" (Remix) (Post Malone featuring Roddy Ricch and Tyga)	2019	—	—	—		Non-album singles
"Spicy" (Remix) (Ty Dolla Sign featuring J Balvin, YG, Tyga and Post Malone)	2021	—	—	—		Non-album singles
"—" denotes a recording that did not chart.

== Other charted and certified songs ==
List of songs, with selected chart positions, showing year released and album name
Title	Year	Peak chart positions				Certifications	Album
Title	Year	US	US R&B	AUS	NZ Hot	Certifications	Album
"Lap Dance"	2011	—	93	—	—		Black Thoughts 2
"The Motto" (Remix) (Drake featuring Lil Wayne and Tyga)	2011	—	—	—	—	ARIA: 2× Platinum; BPI: Platinum	#BitchImTheShit
"Muthafucka Up" (featuring Nicki Minaj)	2012	74	—	—	—		Careless World: Rise of the Last King
"I'm Gone" (featuring Big Sean)	2012	76	—	—	—		Careless World: Rise of the Last King
"Gucci, Louis, Prada" (Twista featuring Tyga)	2012	—	— (Note: "Gucci, Louis, Prada" did not enter the Hot R&B/Hip-Hop Songs, but peaked at number 16 on the Bubbling Under R&B/Hip-Hop Singles chart, which acts as an extension to the Hot R&B/Hip-Hop Songs chart.)	—	—		Dark Horse
"500 Degrees" (featuring Lil Wayne)	2013	— (Note: "500 Degrees" did not enter the Billboard Hot 100, but peaked at number eight on the Bubbling Under Hot 100 Singles chart, which acts as an extension to the Hot 100.)	38	—	—		Hotel California
"Hijack" (featuring 2 Chainz)	2013	— (Note: "Hijack" did not enter the Billboard Hot 100, but peaked at number 11 on the Bubbling Under Hot 100 Singles chart, which acts as an extension to the Hot 100.)	39	—	—		Hotel California
"Get Loose"	2013	—	46	—	—		Hotel California
"Switch Lanes" (featuring The Game)	2013	—	— (Note: "Switch Lanes" did not enter the Hot R&B/Hip-Hop Songs, but peaked at number seven on the Bubbling Under R&B/Hip-Hop Singles chart, which acts as an extension to the Hot R&B/Hip-Hop Songs chart.)	—		RIAA: Gold	Hotel California
"Bubblegum" (Jason Derulo featuring Tyga)	2014	—	—	38	—		Tattoos
"Nothin Like Me" (with Chris Brown featuring Ty Dolla Sign)	2015	—	— (Note: "Nothin Like Me" did not enter the Hot R&B/Hip-Hop Songs, but peaked at number seven on the Bubbling Under R&B/Hip-Hop Singles chart, which acts as an extension to the Hot R&B/Hip-Hop Songs chart.)	—	—		Fan of a Fan: The Album
"Remember Me" (with Chris Brown)	2015	—	— (Note: "Remember Me" did not enter the Hot R&B/Hip-Hop Songs, but peaked at number seven on the Bubbling Under R&B/Hip-Hop Singles chart, which acts as an extension to the Hot R&B/Hip-Hop Songs chart.)	—	—		Fan of a Fan: The Album
"In My Room" (Yellow Claw and Mustard featuring Ty Dolla Sign and Tyga)	2015	—	—	—	—	RIAA: Gold	Blood for Mercy
"Startender" (A Boogie wit da Hoodie featuring Offset and Tyga)	2018	59	21	—	—	RIAA: Platinum; MC: Platinum	Hoodie SZN
"Too Many"	2019	—	—	—	30		Legendary
"Legendary" (featuring Gunna)	2019	—	—	—	25		Legendary
"February Love" (featuring Chris Brown)	2019	—	—	—	26		Legendary
"On God" (Mustard featuring ASAP Ferg, YG, Tyga and ASAP Rocky)	2019	—	—	—	30		Perfect Ten
"West Coast Shit" (Pop Smoke featuring Tyga and Quavo)	2020	65	37	—	—		Shoot for the Stars, Aim for the Moon
"Like Whatever" (Jhene Aiko featuring Tyga)	2026	72	20	-	—		Westside Whimsy
"—" denotes a recording that did not chart.

== Guest appearances ==
List of non-single guest appearances, with other performing artists, showing year released and album name
Title	Year	Other artist(s)	Album
"Clothes Off" (Stress Remix)	2007	Gym Class Heroes, Patrick Stump, Ghostface Killah	As Cruel as School Children
"My Weezy"	2008	Lil Wayne, Shanell, Lil Twist	Dedication 3
"Put You on for Game"	2008	Lil Wayne, Gudda Gudda	Dedication 3
"Cricketz"	2009	New Boyz	Skinny Jeanz and a Mic
"That's All I Have"	2009	Lil Wayne, Shanell	No Ceilings
"She Geeked"	2010	Sean Garrett, Gucci Mane	The Inkwell
"YM Banger"	2010	Lil Wayne, Gudda Gudda, Jae Millz	I Am Not a Human Being
"Fuck My Opponent"	2010	Big Sean	Finally Famous Vol. 3: BIG
"My Girl" (Remix)	2011	Mindless Behavior, Ciara, Lil Twist	none
"Active Kingz"	2011	New Boyz	Too Cool to Care
"Hell Yeah"	2011	YG, Chris Brown	Just Re'd Up
"A Million Lights"	2011	DJ Khaled, Cory Gunz, Mack Maine, Jae Millz, Kevin Rudolf	We the Best Forever
"Sex 101"	2011	Jay Sean	The Mistress
"Burn Me Down"	2011	Gilbere Forte, Raak	87 Dreams
"Shake Twist Drop"	2012	Rye Rye	Go! Pop! Bang!
"Dirty Bass"	2012	Far East Movement	Dirty Bass
"Ratchets" (Remix)	2012	Joe Moses	none
"I Don't Normally Do This"	2012	Jesse McCartney	Have It All
"Don't Pay 4 It"	2012	DJ Khaled, Wale, Mack Maine, Kirko Bangz	Kiss the Ring
"Bag of Money" (Remix)	2012	Wale, Rick Ross, Omarion, French Montana, Lil Wayne, Yo Gotti, Black Cobain, Trina, Rockie Fresh	none
"AKUP"	2012	LoveRance, Problem	Freak of The Industry
"Nasty Nigga"	2012	Kirko Bangz	Procrastination Kills 4
"Do What I Gotta Do"	2012	Big Sean	Detroit
"Put It Down" (Remix)	2012	Brandy, 2 Chainz	none
"So Many Girls"	2012	DJ Drama, Wale, Roscoe Dash	Quality Street Music
"Make You Somebody"	2012	Sterling Simms, 2 Chainz, Travis Porter	Mary & Molly
"My Type of Party" (Remix)	2012	Dom Kennedy, Juicy J	none
"Slide Through"	2012	E-40, Too Short	History: Function Music
"100 On It"	2012	Gudda Gudda	Guddaville 3
"I Endorse These Strippers"	2012	Nicki Minaj, Brinx	Pink Friday: Roman Reloaded – The Re-Up
"Thrilla in Manilla"	2012	French Montana	Mac & Cheese 3
"Cat Daddy" (Remix)	2012	The Rej3ctz, Mann, Dorrough, Chamillionaire	CR33ZTAPE: Rated R
"Fly Rich"	2013	Rich Gang, Stevie J, Future, Meek Mill, Mystikal	Rich Gang: All Stars
"Gangnam Style" (Diplo Remix)	2013	Psy, 2 Chainz	none
"Why"	2013	L.D.	Owls & Spaceships
"Goin' Deep"	2013	Travis Porter	Mr. Porter
"Self Made"	2013	Bow Wow, Busta Rhymes	Greenlight 5
"Everyday Birthday" (Remix)	2013	Swizz Beatz	none
"Caught Up"	2013	Bryan J	none
"Do It"	2013	Problem	The Separation
"Like Whaaat" (Remix)	2013	Problem, Chris Brown, Wiz Khalifa, Master P	none
"Bigger Than Life"	2013	Birdman, Lil Wayne, Chris Brown	Rich Gang
"Panties To The Side"	2013	French Montana, Bow Wow, Gudda Gudda	Rich Gang
"Bands On It"	2013	Mally Mall, Wiz Khalifa, Fresh	none
"Cali Love"	2013	Sabi	0 to 60: Love Sounds
"Fall Back"	2013	Gucci Mane	Diary of a Trap God
"Look"	2013	Nelly, Problem	none
"Dodgers Anthem 2013"	2013	DJ Felli Fel, Ice Cube, Ty Dolla Sign	none
"Baking Soda"	2014	Plies	Da Last Real Nigga Left
"Don't Say"	2014	Liz	Just Like You
"We Dem Boyz" (Remix)	2014	Wiz Khalifa	none
"Adult Swim"	2014	DJ Spinking, Velous, Jeremih	none
"I Luh Ya Papi" (Remix)	2014	Jennifer Lopez, French Montana, Big Sean	none
"Tsunami" (Remix)	2014	DVBBS, BORGEOUS	none
"Girls" (Remix)	2014	Jennifer Lopez	A.K.A.
"Bubblegum"	2014	Jason Derulo	Talk Dirty
"Show You the Money" (Remix)	2014	Wizkid	Ayo
"Understand"	2015	Legacy	Dolo 3
"Like Mariah"	2015	Fifth Harmony	Reflection
"Ride Out"	2015	Kid Ink, Wale, YG, Rich Homie Quan	Furious 7: Original Motion Picture Soundtrack
"Hella Good"	2015	Iamsu	Eyes on Me
"See You Again (Alternate Version)"	2015	Chris Brown, Wiz Khalifa	none
"Do It Again"	2015	Pia Mia, Chris Brown	none
"100"	2015	Travis Barker, Kid Ink, Iamsu!, Ty Dolla Sign	none
"Double Vision"	2015	Prince Royce	Double Vision
"Lipstick"	2015	Isac Elliot	none
"Text Message"	2015	Chris Brown	Before the Party
"Gucci, Louis, Prada" (Remix)	2015	Twista	Midwest Hittaz, Vol. 1
"Get Home" (Remix)	2015	King Los	none
"Feelin U"	2016	KickRaux and Ras Kwame, Ayo Jay, Demarco, Doctor	none
"Brand New Tyga (Interlude)"	2018	Vince Staples	FM!
"Club Bitches"	2019	Zaytoven	Make America Trap Again
"Flossin"	2019	Zaytoven	Make America Trap Again
"Bang"	2019	G-Eazy	B-Sides
"All I Want"	2019	Chris Brown	Indigo
"High Voltage"	2019	Nef the Pharaoh	Mushrooms & Coloring Books
"Blessed"	2019	Shenseea	Alpha
"West Coast Shit"	2020	Pop Smoke, Quavo	Shoot for the Stars, Aim for the Moon
"Rodeo"	2020	YG, Chris Brown	My Life 4Hunnid
"2 Phút Hon" (Make It Hot)	2021	Phao	none
"Move"	2021	Lil Tjay, Saweetie	Destined 2 Win
"Target"	2022	Shenseea	Alpha
"Kim Kardashian"	2023	Oscar Maydon	Distorsión
"Dance With Me"	2025	Ciara	CiCi (album)
"Twitch"	2025	Ty Dolla $ign, 2 Chainz	Tycoon
"Don’t Kill The Party (Coast 2 Coast)"	2025	Ty Dolla $ign, Quavo, Shoreline Mafia	
"Come My Way"	2026	Sơn Tùng M-TP	
"Just The Bro"	2026	Chris Brown	Brown
"In the Way"	2026	The Game, RJMrLA	The Documentary III
"Like, Whatever"	2026	Jhené Aiko	Westside Whimsy

== Music videos ==
Year	Title	Director	Artist(s)
As main performer
2008	"Coconut Juice"	Rage	featuring Travie McCoy
2008	"AIM"	none	none
2009	"Cali Love"	Mickey Finnegan	none
2011	"Far Away"	Chris Robinson, IREN	featuring Chris Richardson
2011	"Rack City"	Chris Robinson	none
2012	"Faded"	Colin Tilley	featuring Lil Wayne
2012	"I'm Gone"	Colin Tilley	featuring Big Sean
2012	"Still Got It"	IREN	featuring Drake
2012	"Make It Nasty"	Alex Nazari	none
2012	"Do My Dance"	Colin Tilley	featuring 2 Chainz
2013	"Switch Lanes"	Alex Nazari	featuring the Game
2013	"Dope"	Colin Tilley	featuring Rick Ross
2013	"Molly"	Colin Tilley	featuring Wiz Khalifa, Mally Mall and Cedric Gervais
2013	"For the Road"	Colin Tilley	featuring Chris Brown
2013	"Show You"	Colin Tilley	featuring Future
2013	"Don't Hate the Playa"	Alex Nazari	none
2013	"Hijack"	Colin Tilley	featuring 2 Chainz
2013	"Throw It Up"	none	none
2014	"Real Deal"	Sharod Marcus Simpson	none
2014	"Make It Work"	Tyga	none
2014	'Hookah"		none
2015	"40 Mil"		none
2015	"Master Suite"	Chris Torres, Crazychrisfilms	none
2015	"Don't C Me Comin'"		none
2015	"Bussin' Out da Bag"		none
2015	"Glitta"	Chris Torres, Crazychrisfilms	none
2015	"Stimulated"	Chris Torres, Crazychrisfilms	none
2015	"Rap $tar"		none
2015	"Clarity"	Chris Torres, Crazychrisfilms	none
2015	"Scandal"	Chris Torres, Crazychrisfilms	none
2015	"Ice Cream Man"	Tyga	none
2015	"Doped Up"	Tyga	none
2015	"Ayo"		none
2016	"I $mile, I Cry"	Tyga	
2016	"$ervin' Dat Raww"	Maria Skobeleva	
2016	"1 of 1"	Shomi Patwary	
2016	"Cash Money"	Maria Skobeleva	
2017	"Gucci Snakes"	Hype Williams	
2017	"100's"	White Trash Tyler	featuring AE and Chief Keef
2017	"Eyes Closed"		featuring King
2017	"Flossin"		
2017	"Nann Nigga"	Maria Skobeleva	featuring Honey Cocaine
2018	"Taste"	Tyga	featuring Offset
2019	"Ayy Macarena"		
As featured performer
2012	"Celebration"	Matt Alonzo	The Game
2014	"Loyal"		Chris Brown featuring Lil Wayne and Tyga
2015	"Do It Again"		Pia Mia
2018	"Kream"		Iggy Azalea featuring Tyga
2019	"Wow." (Remix)		Post Malone featuring Roddy Ricch and Tyga
2019	"Low Key"		Ally Brooke featuring Tyga
