= Hotel California (Tyga album) =

Studio album by Tyga
- Released: April 9, 2013
- Recorded: 2012–13
- Genre: Hip-hop
- Length: 55:59
- Labels: Cash Money; Republic; Young Money
- Producers: Ronald "Slim Tha Don" Williams (exec.); Bryan "Baby Birdman" Williams (exec.); Dwayne "The President" Carter (exec.); DJ Mustard; Cool & Dre; David D.A. Doman; Detail; Dez Dynamic; Dupri; FKi; Jess Jackson; Laze & Royal; Lil' C; Mars of 1500 or Nothin'; Mike Free; NiceBeatz; The Olympicks; Ron Sizzle; Ryan Hunt; SAP

Tyga chronology
Careless World: Rise of the Last King (2012)	Hotel California (2013)	Fan of a Fan: The Album (2015)

Digital cover

Singles from Hotel California
- 1. "Dope" Released: January 15, 2013; 2. "For the Road" Released: April 4, 2013; 3. "Show You" Released: August 27, 2013

Hotel California is the third studio album by American rapper Tyga. It was released on April 9, 2013, by Cash Money Records, Republic Records and Young Money Entertainment. The album features guest appearances from Lil Wayne, 2 Chainz, The Game, Jadakiss, while the production on the album was handled by DJ Mustard, Detail, Cool & Dre, David D.A. Doman, Mars of 1500 or Nothin', The Olympicks, SAP and Ryan Hunt, among others.

Hotel California was supported by three singles: "Dope" (featuring Rick Ross), "For the Road" (featuring Chris Brown), and "Show You" (featuring Future), as well as promotional single "Molly" (featuring Cedric Gervais, Wiz Khalifa and Mally Mall).

The album was met with mixed to negative reviews from music critics. Commercially, it debuted at number seven on the US Billboard 200, with first-week sales of 54,000 copies in the United States. It was later certified gold by the Recording Industry Association of America (RIAA) in March 2020.

== Background ==
On August 20, 2012, Tyga announced the title to his third album, which would be called Hotel California. Tyga explained he made the album in a very short time so all the material would sound the same and go well together. He also compared it to a really good mixtape saying you wouldn't see much music dedicated to the commercial fans. The title is a dedication to his home state of California. Most of the album's sound is based on 1990s West Coast hip hop and sampling.

== Recording and production ==
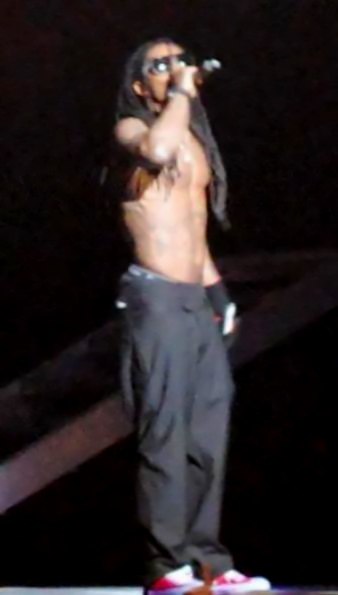
CEO of Young Money, Lil Wayne appeared on the song "500 Degrees", and served as one of the album's executive producers.

On November 24, during his tour vlog, Tyga announced Rick Ross, Nicki Minaj, Chris Brown, Wiz Khalifa and Lil Wayne, to be featured on his upcoming album. The album was named number 28 on XXL's Most Anticipated Albums of 2013 list. On February 7, 2013, Tyga said that he'd was almost finished with the album. He confirmed that he had worked with a fellow rapper ASAP Rocky for this album, but didn't make the final track listing. Musician JMSN was confirmed as one of his multiple collaborations to the album, during his interview with Complex.

The album features guest appearances from 2 Chainz, Future, The Game and Jadakiss. The Tupac feature on the song was one of the most talked about announcements, with the song sharing the same title as Tupac's 1996 diss record, "Hit Em Up". Tyga later clarified that this song was not a remake of Tupac's classic record, but would include unreleased Tupac vocals. He intended to have the song feature Nicki Minaj, but he decided to use Jadakiss as the guest vocalist to sing with the Tupac vocals. However, Tupac's voice does not appear on the final album version, they could not clear the vocal samples. Production on the album was handled by mostly lesser known producers, along with Cool & Dre, DJ Mustard, David D.A. Doman, Lil' C, SAP and Mars of 1500 or Nothin'.

== Release and promotion ==
In August 2012, Tyga released the mixtape Well Done 3, in promotion for the album. The mixtape features guest appearances from The Game, Honey Cocaine, 2 Chainz, Future, Kirko Bangz, D-Lo and Joe Moses; supporting the mixtape was the single, "Do My Dance". Tyga later announced that he would be releasing a nine-track mixtape under the name 187. The mixtape was released on November 30, 2012. It features remixes to songs such as 2 Chainz's "I'm Different", ASAP Rocky's "Fuckin' Problems" and GOOD Music's "Clique", among others and some new materials. In January 2013, Tyga announced a Fan of a Fan 2 mixtape with Chris Brown would be finished when the latter was done touring overseas.

In November 2012, during a red carpet interview at the American Music Awards, he announced that the album would be released for March 2013. On January 22, 2013, Tyga announced on Twitter that the album would be released on March 26, 2013. He then pushed it back to April 9, 2013, to avoid clashing with the release of Lil Wayne's I Am Not a Human Being II, and to clear some of the samples he planned to use on the album. The release date was revealed by DJ Khaled at the end of "Outro" off the Cash Money Records mixtape, titled "Rich Gang: All Stars".

=== Tour ===
Beginning the first week of April, Tyga began a world tour, in promotion of the album. The tour consists of a month in the United States and a month overseas.

== Cover artwork ==
On March 6, 2013, Tyga released the album cover, along with a trailer for the album. The cover art features Tyga in a white fur coat and hat at a lavish mansion, while a tiger sits at his feet. However, it was rumored that he used photoshop instead of a live tiger. Tyga later admitted in an interview with MTV that he jumped the gun by releasing the original cover saying, "Actually that wasn't the official cover, it was never done. I had just tweeted it out like let me see what people think." However, the originally-released cover would turn out to be the in store retail cover. In August 2013, Complex would name the album cover one of "The 30 Worst Hip-Hop Album Covers of All Time".

== Singles ==
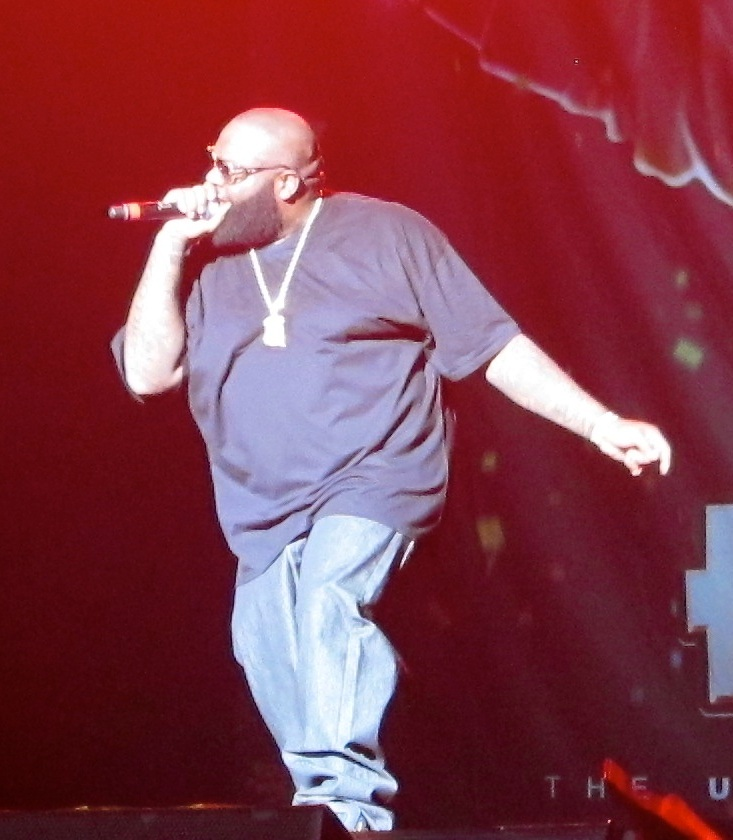
Rapper Rick Ross made a guest appearance on the album's first single "Dope".

In November 2012, Tyga announced that the first single will be titled "Dope", which features guest vocals from a fellow rapper Rick Ross. The song was premiered on December 20, 2012, through Power 106. The song features a sample of Dr. Dre's "Deep Cover". The single was released via digital download on January 15, 2013. The music video was released on January 18, 2013. The song peaked at number 68 on the US Billboard Hot 100.

In February, 2013, Tyga announced that the second single for the album would be titled "For the Road", which features guest vocals from American recording artist Chris Brown. Tyga then said that the song has the same feeling as their hit "Deuces". The song was produced by Cordale "Lil' C" Quinn, and it officially premiered on March 25, 2013. The song was released for digital download on April 4, 2013, along with the pre-order for the album. The music video was filmed in late April, directed by Colin Tilley. The music video for "For the Road" was released on May 19, 2013.

On July 23, 2013, the music video for "Show You" featuring Future, premiered on 106 & Park. "Show You" was released to Rhythmic contemporary radio, as the album's third single on August 27, 2013.

=== Promotional singles ===
On March 15, 2013, Tyga released the previously leaked song, titled "Molly"; a collaboration with Wiz Khalifa, Mally Mall and Cedric Gervais, as the album's promotional single. On March 21, 2013, Tyga shot the music video for "Molly" with Wiz Khalifa and Mally Mall. It was shot in downtown Los Angeles and was directed by Colin Tilley. He described the video as I, Robot meets Alice in Wonderland. On April 7, 2013, the music video was released. The song has since peaked at number 66 on the US Billboard Hot 100.

=== Other songs ===
Upon the release, "500 Degrees" featuring Lil Wayne, "Hijack" featuring 2 Chainz and "Get Loose" debuted at 38, 39 and 46 respectfully on the Billboard's Hot R&B/Hip-Hop Songs chart, respectively. On September 12, 2013, the music video for "Don’t Hate The Playa" was released. On September 20, 2013, the music video for "Hijack" featuring 2 Chainz was released.

== Critical reception ==
Professional ratings
Aggregate scores
Source	Rating
Metacritic	50/100
Review scores
Source	Rating
AllMusic	3/5 stars
Exclaim!	3/10
HipHopDX	2.5/5 stars
Now	2/5 stars
PopMatters	(5/10)
RapReviews	(5/10)
Spin	(3/10)
XXL	(M)

Hotel California was met with generally mixed reviews from music critics. At Metacritic, which assigns a normalized rating out of 100 to reviews from mainstream critics, the album has received an average score of 50, based on 7 reviews, indicating "mixed reviews". David Jeffries AllMusic gave the album three out of five stars, saying "Hotel California refuses to sort his over-the-top bangers into anything sensible, and without a "Rack City" to make it crossover worthy, this is a full-length to leave for the fans." Dave William of XXL gave the album an M, saying "Tyga still thrives in his comfort zone and there are songs that will find success on this album. It’s a desire for more than that that’s missing here." Edwin Ortiz of HipHopDX gave the album two and a half stars out of five, saying "His sexual callousness wears off quickly, and what listeners are left with is a release better fit for a Ramada Inn than a Four Seasons." Jeff Weiss of Spin gave the album a three out of ten, saying "Hotel California is inexcusable. It may be the least creative major-label rap album in recent memory. It's like it was A&R'd by the people who green-lit Battleship, the movie."

== Commercial performance ==
Hotel California debuted at number seven on the US Billboard 200, selling 54,000 copies in its first week. In its second week, the album dropped to number 18 on the chart, selling an additional 19,000 copies. In its third week, the album dropped to number 30 on the chart, selling 12,000 more copies, bringing its three-week total to 84,000 copies. On March 19, 2020, the album was certified gold by the Recording Industry Association of America (RIAA) for combined sales and album-equivalent units over 500,000 units in the United States.

== Track listing ==
No.	Title	Writer(s)	Producer(s)	Length
1.	"500 Degrees" (featuring Lil Wayne)	Michael Stevenson; Dwayne Carter, Jr.; Ryan Hunt; Jess Jackson	Ryan Hunt	3:45
2.	"Dope" (featuring Rick Ross)	Stevenson; William Roberts II; Markous "1st Down" Roberts; Andre Young; Jackson; Calvin Broadus, Jr.; Colin Wolfe	FKi; Jackson	3:43
3.	"Get Loose"	Stevenson; Ronald "Ron Sizzle" Smith	Ron Sizzle	2:47
4.	"Diss Song"	Stevenson; Jonathan King; Andre Lyon; Marcello Valenzano; Jackson	SAP; Cool & Dre; Jackson	4:50
5.	"Hit 'Em Up" (featuring Jadakiss)	Stevenson; Dijon McFarlane; Jason Phillips; Jackson; Tupac Shakur	DJ Mustard; Mike Free^{[a]}	2:38
6.	"Molly" (featuring Cedric Gervais, Wiz Khalifa and Mally Mall)	Stevenson; Cameron Thomaz; Jackson; Jamal Rashid; Cedric DePasquale; Desmond "Dez Dynamic" Mapp; Carlos Cid	Dez Dynamic	3:38
7.	"For the Road" (featuring Chris Brown)	Stevenson; Christopher Brown; Cordale Quinn; Lamar "Mars" Edwards; Jackson; Brian Alexander Morgan; Jaco Pastorius	Lil' C; Mars of 1500 or Nothin'	4:03
8.	"Show You" (featuring Future)	Stevenson; Nayvadius Wilburn; Jackson; Noel "Detail" Fisher; Brian "The Order" Soko	Detail	4:29
9.	"It Neva Rains" (featuring The Game)	Stevenson; Jayceon Taylor; Jackson; Lyon; Valenzano; Timothy Riley; Raphael Saadiq	Cool & Dre	4:07
10.	"M.O.E." (featuring Wiz Khalifa)	Stevenson; Thomaz; M. Roberts; Jackson	FKi	3:38
11.	"Hijack" (featuring 2 Chainz)	Stevenson; Tauheed Epps; Regis "Dupri" Bell; Jackson	Dupri	3:05
12.	"Get Rich"	Stevenson; Bell; Jackson	Dupri	2:59
13.	"Enemies"	Stevenson; King; Jackson; Corinne Bailey Rae	SAP	3:50
14.	"Drive Fast, Live Young"	Stevenson; David D.A. Doman; Jackson; Pier Luigi Salami; Christian Berishaj	David D.A. Doman; Jackson	5:35
15.	"Palm Trees"	Stevenson; Jermaine Cole; Brian Parker; David Stokes; Brian Wicker; Jackson; Jesse James	The Olympicks	2:52

Deluxe edition (bonus tracks)
No.	Title	Writer(s)	Producer(s)	Length
16.	"Dad's Letter"	Stevenson; Jackson	Jackson	4:15
17.	"Don't Hate Tha Playa"	Stevenson; Doman; Jackson	David D.A. Doman	3:38
18.	"Switch Lanes" (featuring The Game)	Stevenson; Taylor; Jackson; Bennett Armstrong; Justyn Armstrong	Laze & Royal; NiceBeatz	3:41

Notes

- ^{^{^[a]}} signifies a co-producer
- "Drive Fast, Live Young" contains uncredited vocals by JMSN.

Sample credits

- "Dope" contains a sample from Dr. Dre and Snoop Dogg's "Deep Cover".
- "It Neva Rains" contains a sample from Tony! Toni! Toné!'s "It Never Rains (In Southern California)".
- "M.O.E." contains a sample from Jay-Z's "Feelin' It".
- "Enemies" contains a sample from "Young & Foolish" performed by The stiX featuring Corinne Bailey Rae.

== Charts ==
=== Weekly charts ===
Chart (2013)	Peak position
Belgian Albums (Ultratop Flanders)	172
Belgian Albums (Ultratop Wallonia)	121
Canadian Albums (Billboard)	20
French Albums (SNEP)	121
German Albums (Offizielle Top 100)	37
Swiss Albums (Schweizer Hitparade)	75
UK Albums (Official Charts)	55
UK R&B Albums (Official Charts)	4
US Billboard 200	7
US Top R&B/Hip-Hop Albums (Billboard)	2

=== Year-end charts ===
Chart (2013)	Position
US Billboard 200	186
US Top R&B/Hip-Hop Albums (Billboard)	42
US Top Rap Albums (Billboard)	21

== Certifications ==
Region	Certification	Certified units/sales
United States (RIAA)	Gold	500,000^{‡}
^{‡} Sales+streaming figures based on certification alone.

== Release history ==
Regions	Dates	Label(s)
Worldwide	April 7, 2013	Young Money Entertainment, Cash Money Records, Republic Records
