= Well Done =

Well Done may refer to:

== Film ==
- Well Done, Henry, a 1936 British comedy film directed by Wilfred Noy and starring Will Fyffe
- Well Done (1994 film), a documentary by Thomas Imbach
- Well Done (2003 film), a Tamil film
- Well Done (2016 film) (Italian: A Regola d'Arte), a 2016 Italian dramatic short film directed by Riccardo Di Gerlando.

== Music ==
- Well-Done (album), by Action Bronson
- Well Done, a 1973 album by T-Bone Walker
- Well Done (mixtape), by Tyga
  - Well Done 2, a mixtape by Tyga
  - Well Done 3, a mixtape by Tyga
- "Well Done", a song by Idles
- "Well Done", a song by The Afters
