= The Gold Album =

The Gold Album or Gold album may refer to:

- The Gold Album: 18th Dynasty, 2015 album by Tyga
- Weezer (Gold Album), 2026 album by Weezer
