= For the Road =

Single by Tyga featuring Chris Brown

from the album Hotel California
- Released: April 4, 2013
- Recorded: 2012
- Genre: Hip-hop; R&B
- Length: 4:06
- Label: Young Money; Cash Money; Republic
- Songwriters: Michael Stevenson; Christopher Brown; Cordale Quinn; Lamar "Mars" Edwards; Jess Jackson; Brian Alexander Morgan; Jaco Pastorius
- Producers: Lil' C; Mars of 1500 or Nothin'

Tyga singles chronology
"So Many Girls" (2013)	"For the Road" (2013)	"Bubble Butt" (2013)

Chris Brown singles chronology
"Fine China" (2013)	"For the Road" (2013)	"Beat It" (2013)

Music video
- "For the Road" on YouTube

"F*ck For the Road" clean version titled "For the Road" is a song by American rapper Tyga. It was released on April 4, 2013, as the second official single from his third studio album Hotel California. The song, produced by Grand Hustle record producers Cordale "Lil' C" Quinn and Mars of 1500 or Nothin', features a guest appearance from American singer Chris Brown. The song samples "Rain" by SWV.

== Background ==
In February 2013, Tyga announced during an interview that the second official single from the album would be titled "For the Road", and feature frequent collaborator Chris Brown. Tyga said the song has the same feeling as their hit "Deuces". The song is produced by Lil C and was premiered on March 25. The song was then released for digital download on April 4, 2013 along with the pre-order for the album. On May 14, 2013 the song was released to Rhythmic contemporary radio along with the third single "Show You".

== Critical response ==
It was panned by PopMatters: "Likewise, "For the Road" (formerly "Fuck for the Road") is such an utter clash of lowbrow concept and pre-teen shine that Chris Brown ought to have been paired with a more ludicrous rapper in the Lil Boosie or Busta Rhymes mold.."

== Music video ==
The music video for "For the Road" was filmed on April 21, 2013, and was directed by Colin Tilley. The music video premiered on MTV Jams on May 19, 2013.

== Track listing ==
Digital single

No.	Title	Writer(s)	Producer(s)	Length
1.	"For the Road" (featuring Chris Brown)	Michael Ray Nguyen-Stevenson; Christopher Maurice Brown; Cordale Quinn; Lamar Edwards; J. Jackson; B. Alexander Morgan; J. Pastorius	Lil C; Mars of 1500 or Nothin'	4:06

== Charts ==
Chart (2013)	Peak position
US Bubbling Under Hot 100 (Billboard)	15
US Hot R&B/Hip-Hop Songs (Billboard)	39

== Release history ==
Country	Date	Format	Label
United States	April 4, 2013	Digital download	Young Money, Cash Money, Republic
United States	May 14, 2013	Rhythmic contemporary radio	Young Money, Cash Money, Republic
