= Dope (Tyga song) =

Single by Tyga featuring Rick Ross

from the album Hotel California
- Released: January 15, 2013
- Recorded: 2012
- Genre: Hip hop
- Length: 3:45
- Label: Young Money; Cash Money; Republic
- Songwriters: Michael Stevenson; William Roberts II; Markous "1st Down" Roberts; Andre Young; Jess Jackson; Calvin Broadus, Jr.; Colin Wolfe
- Producers: FKi; Jess Jackson

Tyga singles chronology
"Do My Dance" (2012)	"Dope" (2013)	"So Many Girls" (2013)

Rick Ross singles chronology
"Lord Knows" (2012)	"Dope" (2013)	"Bugatti" (2013)

"Dope" is a song by American rapper Tyga with a guest appearance from fellow rapper Rick Ross. The song was originally titled "187" but was later changed to "Dope". It was released on January 15, 2013 as the first single from his third album Hotel California (2013). Co-written by both artists and produced by FKi and Jess Jackson, the song samples "Deep Cover" by Dr. Dre and Snoop Dogg.

The song received mixed reviews from critics who felt that it paled in comparison to the original hip-hop classic. "Dope" managed to peak at number 68 on the Billboard Hot 100. It fared better charting at numbers 15 and 19 on the Hot Rap Songs and Hot R&B/Hip-Hop Songs charts respectively. The song was certified gold by the Recording Industry Association of America (RIAA), denoting sales of over 500,000 copies. It received similar chart presence in Canada, peaking at number 72 on the Canadian Hot 100.

The accompanying music video for the song was directed by Colin Tilley and features Tyga getting in a car chase with the cops throughout the city.

== Music video ==
The music video was released on January 18, 2013, and was directed by Colin Tilley. The video begins with Tyga walking up to a parked car and shooting the driver. Tyga then gets into his own car and drives away. Right as he drives away cops begin to follow him and a high speed chase around the city begins. The rest of the video switches between scenes of the car chase and Tyga rapping inside a mansion with Rick Ross.

== Critical reception ==
"Dope" received mixed reviews from music critics. AllMusic's David Jeffries said that the track was "the almost worthy "Rack City" successor with [Rick] Ross on the shot callers cut." Chayne Japal of Exclaim! said that it was an interesting take on the song but that it "ultimately crumbles with Tyga's inappropriate implementation of the non-chorus." Steve 'Flash' Juon of RapReviews felt that producers FKi stripped the song of almost everything that made the original well-regarded and doesn't standout as much.

== Chart performance ==
"Dope" debuted and peaked at number 68 on the US Billboard Hot 100 for the week of February 9, 2013 and stayed on the chart for ten weeks. That same week, it debuted at number 15 on the US Hot Rap Songs chart and number 19 on the US Hot R&B/Hip-Hop Songs chart. On December 10, 2013, the song was certified gold by the Recording Industry Association of America (RIAA) for selling over 500,000 copies in the United States. In Canada, it debuted at number 72 on the Canadian Hot 100 before leaving the next week.

== Track listing ==
Digital download
No.	Title	Length
1.	"Dope" (featuring Rick Ross)	3:45

== Charts ==
=== Weekly charts ===
Chart (2013)	Peak position
Australia Urban (ARIA)	39
Canada (Canadian Hot 100)	72
UK R&B (Official Charts Company)	34
UK Singles Chart	178
US Billboard Hot 100	68
US Hot R&B/Hip-Hop Songs (Billboard)	19
US Hot Rap Songs (Billboard)	15

=== Year-end charts ===
Chart (2013)	Position
US Hot R&B/Hip-Hop Songs (Billboard)	85

== Certifications ==
Region	Certification	Certified units/sales
United States (RIAA)	Gold	500,000^{‡}
^{‡} Sales+streaming figures based on certification alone.

== Release history ==
Country	Date	Format	Label
United States	January 15, 2013	Digital download	Cash Money, Universal Republic
United States	January 29, 2013	Urban contemporary radio	Cash Money, Universal Republic
