= Tyga =

American rapper (born 1989)

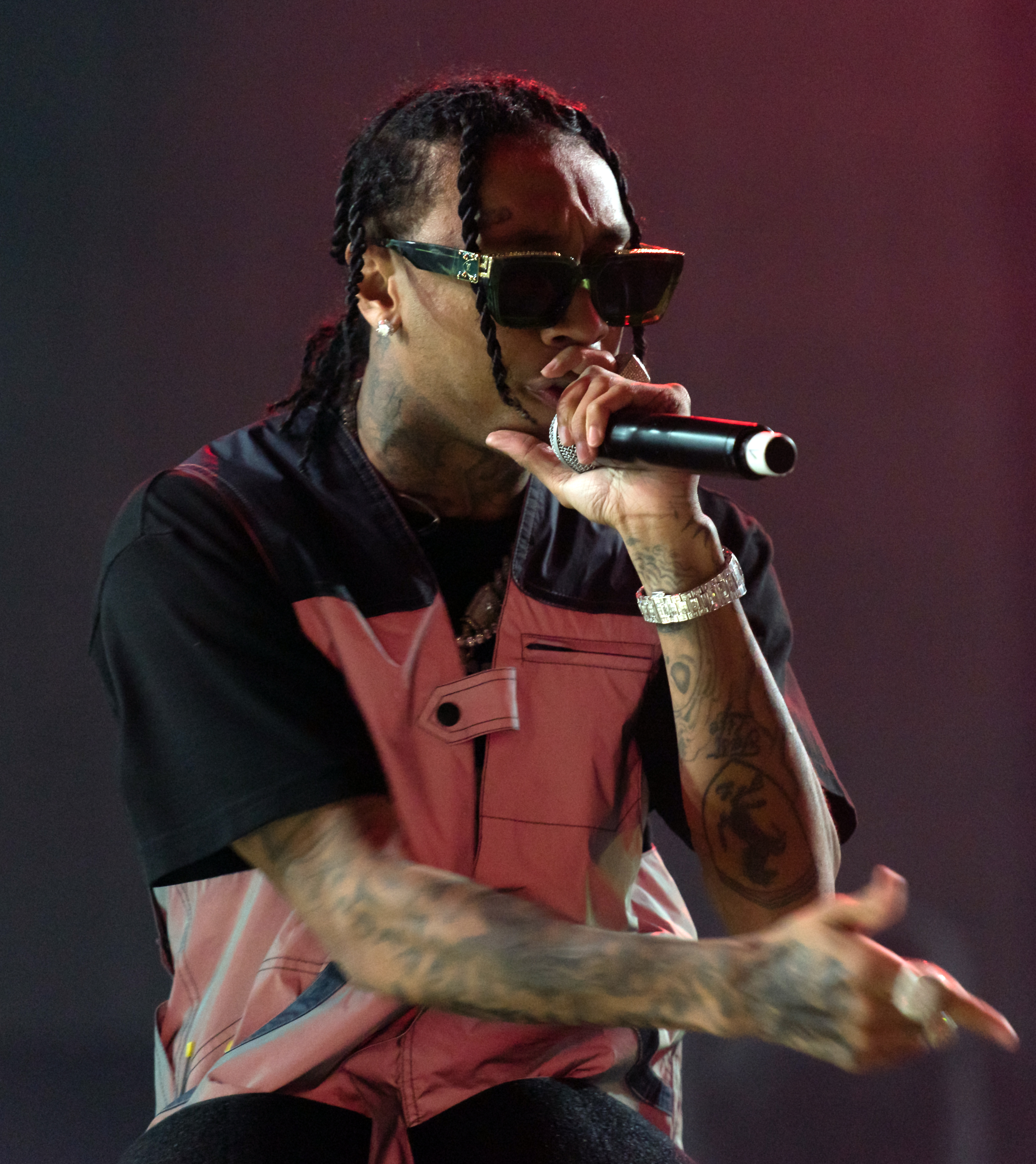
- Tyga in 2019
- Born: Micheal Ray Stevenson; November 19, 1989 (age 36); Compton, California, U.S.
- Other names: Kinggoldchains; $tarface; T-Raww
- Occupations: Rapper; singer; actor; television personality; songwriter
- Years active: 2007–present
- Works: Discography; filmography
- Spouse: Jordan Craig (m. 2010; div. 2011)
- Partners: Blac Chyna (2011–2014); Kylie Jenner (2014–2017)
- Children: 1
- Awards: Full list
- Musical career
- Origin: Gardena, California, U.S.
- Genres: West Coast hip-hop; pop rap
- Labels: Columbia; Last Kings; EMPIRE; GOOD; Interscope; Cash Money; Young Money; Republic; G.E.D Inc.; Decaydance
- Website: tyga.net

Micheal Ray Stevenson (born November 19, 1989), known professionally as Tyga (/ˈtaɪɡə/; a backronym for Thank You God Always), is an American rapper, singer, and actor. He first signed with Decaydence Records to release his debut studio album No Introduction (2008), but came to mainstream recognition after signing with Lil Wayne's Young Money Entertainment, an imprint of Cash Money Records and Republic Records in 2008. His second album and major label debut, Careless World: Rise of the Last King (2012), peaked at number four on the Billboard 200 and received platinum certification by the Recording Industry Association of America (RIAA). It spawned the Billboard Hot 100-top ten single "Rack City", as well as the top 40 single "Faded" (featuring Lil Wayne). His third album, Hotel California (2013), debuted in the top ten of the Billboard 200, along with his the collaborative album with singer Chris Brown, Fan of a Fan: The Album (2015).

Due to disagreements with Young Money, Tyga's fourth album, The Gold Album: 18th Dynasty (2015), was self-released and witnessed a steep critical and commercial decline, along with his fifth and sixth albums, BitchImTheShit2 (2017) and Kyoto (2018). He experienced a resurgence with his 2018 single, "Taste" (featuring Offset), which peaked at number eight on the Billboard Hot 100 and was certified diamond by the RIAA, serving as the lead single for his seventh album, Legendary (2019). His following albums, NSFW (2025) and Starface (2026), both failed to chart and were poorly received; the latter was heavily criticized for its use of artificial intelligence.

== Early life ==
Micheal Ray Stevenson was born on November 19, 1989, in Compton, California, and raised there until he "was about 11, 12", before moving to adjacent Gardena. He was born to Jamaican and Vietnamese parents. His mother, Pasionaye Nicole Nguyen (September 11, 1971 – January 18, 2025), was born in Vietnam and had the maiden name Nguyen. He grew up listening to Fabolous, Lil Wayne, Cam'ron, and Eminem, among others.

On December 3, 2012, debate arose concerning Tyga's upbringing. Tyga claimed to have been brought up in the low socioeconomic area of Compton, but in leaked footage from the unaired television show Bustas, he claimed he grew up in a "well-to-do" home in the Valley, where his parents drove a Range Rover. He also claimed that he attained his nickname from his mother calling him Tiger Woods. There has been speculation that his claims on the show were satirical and not to be taken seriously. Tyga responded to the video's leak on Twitter: "When u 14 an ambitious u don't give a fuk about anything. Scripted tv isn't that what we all live for. Hahahaha."

== Career ==
=== 2007–2010: No Introduction and mixtapes ===
I met Tyga, he handed me a mixtape on Melrose. I was out in L.A. shopping. (...) You know, being on the road, I get demos and mixtapes all the time. Me and Matt, the drummer of Gym Class, we had this running joke like, “Let's start the record label called Roadside Records”. The joke was, “Yeah give us your demo and we’ll sign you to Roadside Records.” Our motto was “your demo hits the streets the same night” which means as soon as we get your demo, we throwing them bitches out the bus window. (laughs) For some reason, I didn’t throw Tyga’s out. I kept it and listened to it like, homie got potential and he had a lot of energy. So I took him under my wing.

— Travie McCoy on discovering Tyga in a 2021 interview with HotNewHipHop.

Tyga's career began with him releasing a multitude of demo tapes and mixtapes. His 2007 debut mixtape, Young On Probation, garnered the attention of rapper and Gym Class Heroes frontman, Travie McCoy. Seeing talent in the artist, McCoy led him to sign a recording contract with Fall Out Boy bassist Pete Wentz's independent label Decaydence Records. Tyga ended up performing on Fall Out Boy's "This Ain't a Scene, It's an Arms Race" remix with McCoy and Lil' Wayne at the 2007 MTV Video Music Awards. He also performed at gigs with Gym Class Heroes and received mentoring from McCoy. McCoy stated that he "had [Tyga] sending me verses every other day. We started doing interviews, and he was like, 'This my big cousin Trav.' So a lot of people had the misunderstanding we were blood-related".

On June 10, 2008, Tyga released his debut studio album, No Introduction McCoy's imprint, BatSquad Records. It was preceded by the single "Coconut Juice," featuring McCoy, which became his first entry on the Billboard Hot 100. In addition to McCoy, the music video featured appearances by Pete Wentz and Lil' Wayne. The album peaked at number 112 on the Billboard 200 and received mixed reviews. A song from the album, "Diamond Life" was used in the video games Need for Speed: Undercover and Madden NFL 2009, as well as in the 2009 film Fighting.

Around this time, Tyga formed the record label G.E.D. Inc. (Grinding every day, Getting every dollar, or Getting educated daily) around the time, the same imprint that helped launch the career of fellow West Coast rapper Schoolboy Q, with whom he has worked with early in his career. Tyga also has a G.E.D. Inc tattoo above his right eyebrow.

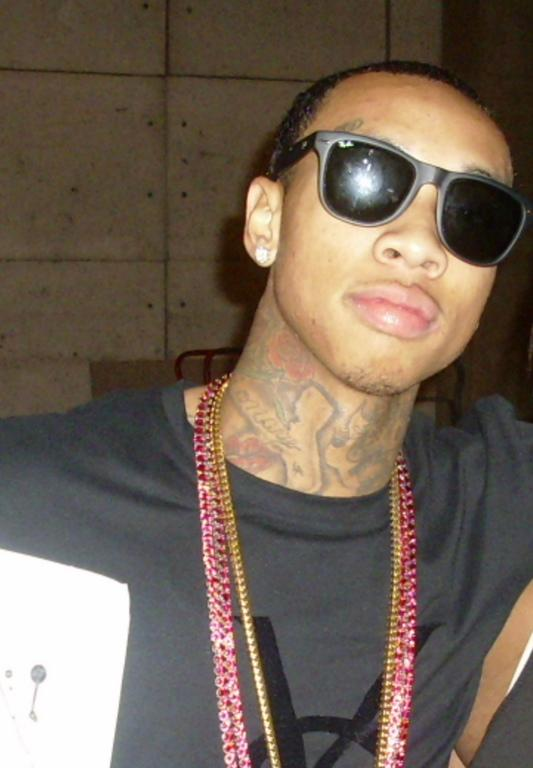
Tyga in 2008

In late 2008, Tyga signed a new record deal with Lil Wayne's Young Money Entertainment, which was a subsidiary of Cash Money Records at the time. He appeared on the label's posse cut hit single "Bedrock" shortly after his signing. He later released the mixtape Fan of a Fan with singer Chris Brown and producers DJ Ill Will and DJ Rockstar. It featured other artists such as Bow Wow, Lil Wayne, and Kevin McCall featured in several tracks. Four tracks — "Holla at Me", "G Shit", "No Bullshit" and "Deuces" — were accompanied with music videos. The track "Deuces" was released as the lead single for the mixtape and reached number 14 on the Billboard Hot 100 and number one on the Billboard Hot R&B/Hip-Hop Songs; it was also nominated for Best Rap/Sung Collaboration at the 53rd Grammy Awards. Tyga told MTV in an interview that the mixtape's production took just short of a week. "Deuces" was eventually included on Brown's fourth studio album, F.A.M.E. (2011).

=== 2011–2012: Careless World: Rise of the Last King ===
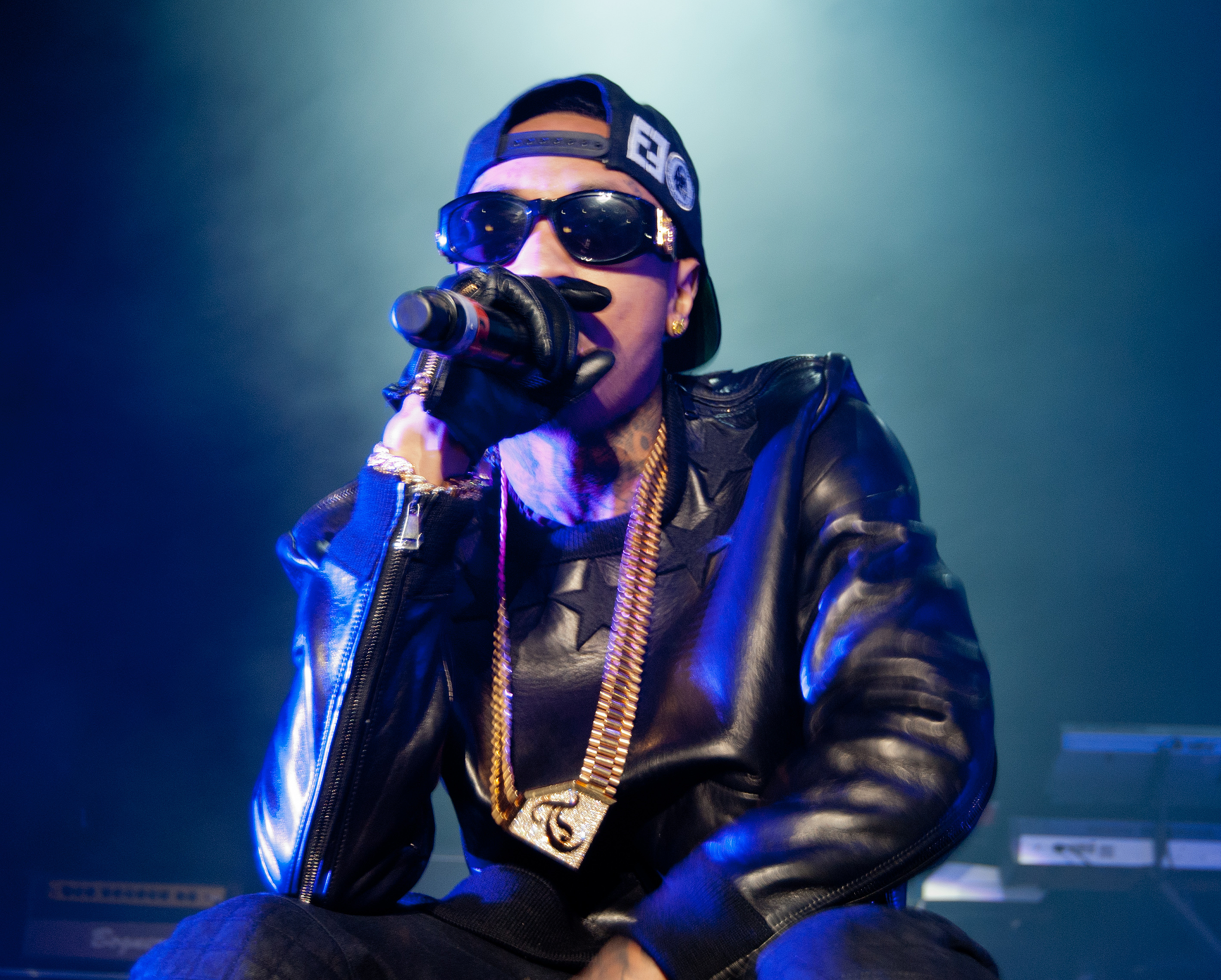
Tyga in 2012

Careless World: Rise of the Last King was his second studio album. The album was released on February 21, 2012, on Young Money Entertainment, Cash Money Records, and Universal Republic Records. It was a shift from the poppy dance sound exemplified on his previous effort, No Introduction, and geared towards the gangsta rap style first heard in his collaborative album with Young Money, We Are Young Money (2009). Tyga stated that the album shows he has grown up but still relates to the kids. In preparation for the album, Tyga released the mixtape #BitchImTheShit in December 2011.

The album was preceded by four singles. Its first, "Far Away" (featuring Chris Richardson), was released on May 17, 2011, and peaked at 86 on the Billboard Hot 100. Its second, "Still Got It" (featuring labelmate Drake), was released on October 4, 2011, and peaked at 89 on the Billboard Hot 100. Its third single, "Rack City", was released on December 6, 2011. It first appeared on Tyga's Well Done 2 mixtape, and was later listed to the album following its commercial success. It debuted at number 94 on the Billboard Hot 100, and peaked at number eight. Its fourth single, "Faded" (featuring label boss Lil Wayne), was released on January 13, 2012. It peaked at number 33 on the chart.

For the remainder of that year, Tyga made several guest appearances on other singles, most notably on the Billboard Hot 100 entries "Snitches Ain't…" by YG, "Ayy Ladies" by Travis Porter, and "Get Low" by Waka Flocka Flame. In August, he released the mixtape Well Done 3, which spawned by the single "Do My Dance" (featuring 2 Chainz). The song peaked at number 79 on the Billboard Hot 100.

Also that year, Tyga also produced and co-directed (with Justice Young) a multi-AVN Award-nominated crossover adult film, Rack City: The XXX Movie, which starred Skin Diamond, Jada Fire, Ice La Fox, Sophie Dee, Lexington Steele, Kristina Rose, London Keyes and Daisy Marie. He also signed the soundtrack, which includes the hits "Rack City" and "Faded" together with several original songs, and he appeared in the film in a non-sex role.

=== 2012–2013: Hotel California ===
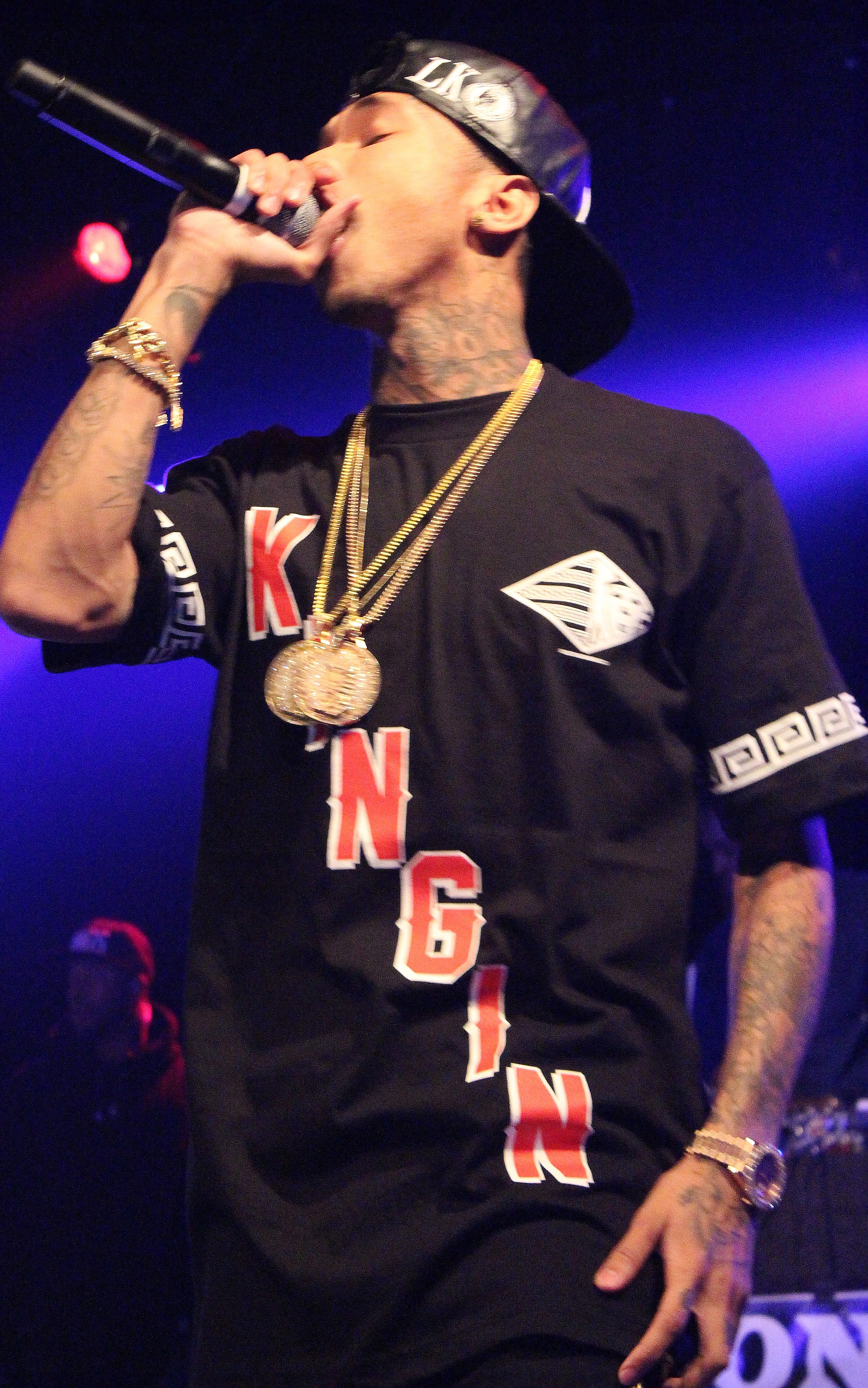
Tyga in 2013

Tyga's third studio album, Hotel California, was released on April 9, 2013. The first single, "Dope", was released on December 25. The sported a feature from rapper Rick Ross. Before the single dropped Tyga released a nine-track mixtape under the name 187. 187 the mixtape was released on November 30, 2012. It features remixes to songs such as 2 Chainz's "I'm Different", Meek Mill's "Young & Gettin' It" and GOOD Music's "Clique", among others and new material. On episode three of Tyga's tour vlog Tyga confirmed four features on the upcoming album, including Rick Ross, Nicki Minaj, Chris Brown, and Wiz Khalifa. Tyga performed at Harvard University's Yardfest in the Spring of 2013, despite opposition from critics who've signed a petition seeking to keep him away over what they call his "violently misogynistic lyrics". At this time, Tyga collaborated with singer Sabi on her song "Cali Love".

Hotel California was released on April 9, 2013. The album featured guest appearances from Lil Wayne, Chris Brown, Rick Ross, 2 Chainz, Game, Wiz Khalifa, Future and Jadakiss. Along with production by Cool & Dre, D. A. Doman, DJ Mustard, Detail, Mars of 1500 or Nothin', The Olympicks, and SAP among others. The album was supported by three official singles — "Dope" which features Rick Ross, "For the Road" featuring Chris Brown, and "Show You" featuring Future, along with the promotional single "Molly". The album was met with generally mixed reviews from music critics. It also was less successful than his debut album commercially, debuting at number seven on the U.S. Billboard 200 with first-week sales of 54,000 copies in the United States.

=== 2013–2015: The Gold Album: 18th Dynasty ===
On August 27, 2013, Tyga released a new single with DJ Mustard, "Throw It Up". It was also revealed that he was working on two new mixtapes, Black Thought 3 and Well Done 4, as well as The Gold Album. On October 21, 2013, Tyga premiered "Wait for a Minute" featuring Justin Bieber. It was released to iTunes the following day. He then confirmed that an album would be released in early 2014. He also explained that the album would, be more "way less commercial". He also said "I felt like Hotel California was more commercial and I made more radio-type records. This album is straight rap." Then on April 9, 2014, Tyga released a song called "Hookah" which features the rapper Young Thug.

On May 1, 2014, Tyga made a tweet referring to Kanye West, Mike Dean, and his own producer Jess Jackson with a hash-tag The Gold Album. Kanye West served as the executive producer for the album, which was slated for release on November 18, 2014. Tyga was also featured on Chris Brown's single "Loyal", he was featured on the video version, the song since then peaked at number nine on the US Billboard Hot 100. On May 28, 2014, Tyga released a new song entitled "Real Deal" via SoundCloud. "Real Deal" was later released on iTunes on August 1, 2014. On September 12, 2014, Tyga announced via his instagram that his new single titled "40 Mill" would be produced by Kanye West, Mike Dean, Dupri and his own producer Jess Jackson, artwork, The release date was not revealed though. The album was set to have features from Justin Bieber, Young Thug, Kanye West, Chris Brown, and Drake. Tyga criticized Drake in an October 2014 interview, calling Drake "fake" and said that he did not like Nicki Minaj.

On October 21, 2014, Tyga lashed out on his record label Young Money Entertainment, reporting that his album was completed, but that his music was being "held hostage" by the label, who would not allow him to release it, and stated that he was considering leaking the album. On December 4, 2014, Tyga made a tweet declaring his project, The Gold Album: 18th Dynasty would be released independently due to not being on good terms with label Cash Money Records. In February 2015, Tyga released a collaborative album with Chris Brown, titled Fan of a Fan: The Album. Supported by the No. 21 peaking Billboard single "Ayo", the album peaked at No. 7 on the Billboard Hot 200 and featured guest appearances from 50 Cent, T.I., Pusha T, Wale, Ty Dolla Sign, Schoolboy Q, Boosie Badazz, and Fat Trel. On June 23, 2015, Tyga released The Gold Album for streaming exclusively on Spotify then later on Apple Music. The album became his worst selling album to date, selling roughly 2,000 units on its opening week.

His reality show Kingin' with Tyga premiered on July 24, 2015, on MTV2.

=== 2016–2017: Signing to GOOD Music and BitchImTheShit2 ===
On September 7, 2016, Kanye West, who, like Tyga, was in a relationship to a Kardashian at the time, announced that he had signed Tyga to his GOOD Music imprint, under the aegis of Def Jam Recordings.

On July 17, 2017, it was announced that Tyga will join as a series regular in the third season of the VH1 slasher television series Scream. He starred in the role of Jamal Elliot. The season premiered on July 8, 2019. On July 21, 2017, Tyga released his fifth studio album, BitchImTheShit2, the sequel to his 2011 mixtape #BitchImTheShit.

=== 2018–2020: Kyoto and Legendary ===
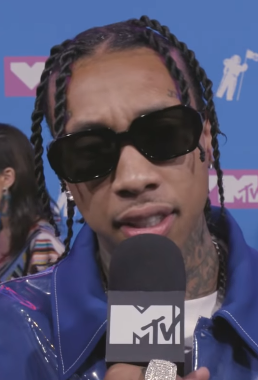
Tyga in 2018

On February 16, 2018, Tyga released his sixth studio album, Kyoto. The album was panned by critics and sold poorly, becoming his first album to fail to chart anywhere. On May 16, 2018, Tyga released the single "Taste" featuring Offset of Migos. The song was a smash hit, becoming one of the biggest songs of summer 2018 and peaking at number 8 on the US Billboard Hot 100. It marked Tyga's first entry on the Hot 100 in three years, since 2015's "Ride Out", and is certified Diamond by the Recording Industry Association of America (RIAA). The song is considered the catalyst for Tyga's return to the mainstream music spotlight after almost 5 years of poor sales and negative reviews, being considered his "comeback" record.

Following the success of "Taste", Tyga released a number of other singles throughout the latter of 2018, beginning with "Swish", which was certified Platinum, and later released "Dip" featuring Nicki Minaj, which was certified platinum. He was also featured on Iggy Azalea's platinum single, "Kream" in 2018, and "Sip It" in 2021. Tyga's seventh album Legendary was released in June 2019.

In 2019, YG released the single "Go Loko", which featured Tyga. He stated, "We wanted to do something different to kinda try to bring all Latins together" and "Even YG could tell you, he grew up around all Mexicans, so we really wanted to do something to give back to the culture." That same year, he appeared on the worldwide hit "Loco Contigo", alongside DJ Snake and J Balvin, and achieved moderate international success with "Ayy Macarena".

In July 2020, Tyga partnered with businessman Robert Earl to launch a virtual kitchen brand called Tyga Bites, which uses existing restaurants' kitchens to produce branded menu items such as boneless chicken wings for delivery service only.

=== 2021–present: NSFW and Starface ===
In 2021, Tyga competed on the sixth season of The Masked Singer as "Dalmatian". He was the first of Group B to be eliminated.

In 2024, Tyga announced his eighth studio album, titled NSFW (short for "Not Safe for Work"). It was released on February 7, 2025.

In May 2025, Tyga arrived in Russia and performed at the CSKA Arena in Moscow. In 2025, Tyga featured on the Ciara single "Dance with Me", appearing on the latter's eighth studio album, CiCi, which was released on August 22, 2025.

In July 2026, Tyga released Starface, a 1980s synthwave, pop, and disco-influenced album. During the album's promotional run, Tyga admitted to Vibe that Starface incorporates artificial intelligence. The album was widely panned by critics, with Pitchfork giving it their first 0.0-rated review in 19 years.

== Musical style and artistry ==
Tyga's music is primarily rooted in West Coast hip hop, occasionally incorporating elements of pop rap, trap, and R&B. His lyrics frequently explore themes of wealth, sex, clubbing, romantic love, and a luxurious lifestyle. XXL, reviewing Hotel California, noted Tyga's "charisma and technical abilities" and that he could "switch gears impressively, balancing a strong flow and a melodic sing-rap", while Pitchfork has described his flow as usually being "laid-back".

Tyga has cited Lil Wayne as a major musical inspiration, having been a fan of Wayne since his youth and later observing his career while signed to Young Money Entertainment. He has also cited Eminem, Tupac Shakur, Snoop Dogg, and Dr. Dre as influences, while identifying Prince as another influence on his artistic choices.

His musical style has evolved throughout his career, moving from the "polished pop-rap" sound of his debut to the club-oriented, hyphy, "LA ratchet" sound popularized by producer DJ Mustard, which defined his early-2010s breakthrough with "Rack City." Fan of a Fan (2010), his collaborative mixtape with Chris Brown, was credited as a notable release of the early-2010s "swag" and "jerk" era in hip hop, helping bring it to a wider audience. He later adopted a trap-oriented sound characterized by high-pitched R&B vocal samples in the beats, often produced by D.A. Got That Dope, which became associated with his commercial resurgence in the late 2010s. His hit single "Taste" (2018), exemplified this approach.

Tyga has also released experimental projects that departed from his usual hip-hop sound, including the R&B-pop album Kyoto (2018) and the 1980s-inspired synth-pop album $TARFACE (2026). Both projects were panned by critics, drawing comparisons to Lil Wayne's rock-influenced album Rebirth (2010) for their departures from their respective artists' established styles.

== Personal life ==
On September 6, 2010, Tyga married Jordan Craig. He filed for divorce one month later, and it was finalized in 2011.

Tyga met model Blac Chyna on October 5, 2011, at The F.A.M.E Tour After Party with Chris Brown at King of Diamonds in Miami. Blac Chyna was cast as Tyga's leading lady in his "Rack City" music video. They became engaged on November 9, 2011, and posed for the cover of Urban Ink magazine in March 2012. On October 16, 2012, their son, named King Cairo, was born, and Tyga purchased a $6.5 million mansion in Calabasas, California that same month. Both parents have tattoos of their son's name. The couple split in 2014.

After months of speculation, Tyga confirmed his relationship with reality star Kylie Jenner in August 2015. However, this relationship sparked controversy due to the age disparity, and the fact that they were reportedly dating since Jenner was 16. The legal age of consent in the state of California is 18. Photos of him and Jenner first seen holding hands in Mexico went viral a few days after her 18th birthday. The couple split in April 2017.

Tyga dated British social model Demi Rose for a short time in 2016.

On February 21, 2025, Tyga announced that his mother, Pasionaye Nicole Nguyen, had died at age 53 a month earlier on January 18.

=== Robbery ===
In June 2008, Tyga was robbed of his jewelry by unknown assailants. A pair of diamond chains would end up in the hands of local rapper 40 Glocc, who showed them off in an online video. Tyga would eventually admit to the robbery, but said 40 Glocc wasn't behind it. "Some niggas seen me and ran up on me with a little burner... I guess 40 Glocc's peoples robbed the peoples that got me, and then hopped on YouTube, talking about they robbed me."

=== Legal issues ===
In late 2012, Tyga was sued by two women who appeared in the "Make It Nasty" video for $10 million each; they claimed he had shown their nipples without their consent. They were assured that this would be edited out and the unedited version would not be released, but Tyga proceeded to release a fully unedited version. On September 21, 2013, another woman from the video sued Tyga for sexual battery, fraud, invasion of privacy, and infliction of emotional distress. She claims, like the two other women who have filed suit against him, that she was convinced to dance topless and assured her breasts would be edited out.

On September 4, 2013, it was reported Tyga had been sued by Beverly Hills-based jeweler Jason Arasheben for allegedly not paying for roughly $91,000 worth of jewelry. Arasheben claims that Tyga agreed to pay $28,275 for the jeweler's diamond pantheon watch in August 2012 and that he borrowed a $63,000 diamond Cuban link chain in December 2012 and never returned the item, so he sued Tyga for the cost of both pieces, plus late fees, which totaled up to $185,306.50 in damages, double the original total cost. Tyga fell ill before the interrogation of this debt and was considered not able to proceed. He also did not bring the documents he was supposed to, however, he paid $100,000 of the $200,000 owed to his client.

In June 2015, a judge ordered Tyga to pay an $80,000 settlement to a former landlord, who rented a home to the rapper in the city of Calabasas, California. It was the second ruling in the case, following a judgment in May 2015, in which he was ordered to pay $90,000, though the debt was never paid. In September 2015, the state of California placed a tax lien on Tyga for $19,000 in unpaid taxes. On his birthday, he was given a lawsuit in 2016.

In October 2021, Tyga was arrested by police over domestic abuse charges.

== Discography ==
Solo studio albums

- No Introduction (2008)
- Careless World: Rise of the Last King (2012)
- Hotel California (2013)
- The Gold Album: 18th Dynasty (2015)
- BitchImTheShit2 (2017)
- Kyoto (2018)
- Legendary (2019)
- NSFW (2025)
- Starface (2026)

Collaborative studio albums

- Fan of a Fan: The Album (with Chris Brown) (2015)
- Hit Me When U Leave the Klub: The Playlist (with YG) (2023)

== Tours ==
Opening act

- F.A.M.E. Tour (with Chris Brown) (2011)
- Between the Sheets Tour (with Chris Brown and Trey Songz) (2015)
- Pink Friday 2 World Tour (with Nicki Minaj) (2024)
- Tha Carter VI Tour (with Lil Wayne) (2025)

== Filmography ==
Film
Year	Title	Role
2012	Mac & Devin Go to High School	Student
2015	Dope	De'Andre
2016	Barbershop: The Next Cut	Yummy
2016	Boo! A Madea Halloween	Himself
2017	Once Upon a Time in Venice	Salvatore
2017	Welcome to My Life	Himself

Television
Year	Title	Role	Notes
2019	Scream: Resurrection	Jamal "Jay" Elliot	Main role (season 3)
2019	All That	Himself	Musical guest; Episode 1113
2021	The Masked Singer	Dalmatian	season 6 contestant

== Awards and nominations ==
Year	Awards	Category	Recipient	Result
2011	Grammy Awards	Best Rap/Sung Collaboration	"Deuces" (with Chris Brown and Kevin McCall)	Nominated
2011	BET Awards	Best Collaboration	"Deuces" (with Chris Brown and Kevin McCall)	Nominated
2012	BET Awards	Best Collaboration	"The Motto" (with Drake and Lil Wayne)	Nominated
2012	BET Awards	Coca-Cola Viewers' Choice	"The Motto" (with Drake and Lil Wayne)	Nominated
2012	BET Hip Hop Awards	Reese's Perfect Combo Award	"The Motto" (with Drake and Lil Wayne)	Nominated
2012	BET Hip Hop Awards	Best Club Banger	"The Motto" (with Drake and Lil Wayne)	Nominated
2012	MuchMusic Video Awards	MuchVIBE Hip-Hop Video of the Year	"The Motto" (with Drake and Lil Wayne)	Won
2012	MTV Europe Music Awards	Best US Act	Himself	Nominated
2012	American Music Awards	Favorite Rap/Hip-Hop Artist	Himself	Nominated
2014	World Music Awards	World's Best Male Artist	Himself	Nominated
2014	World Music Awards	World's Best Live Act	Himself	Nominated
2014	World Music Awards	World's Best Entertainer of the Year	Himself	Nominated
2014	World Music Awards	World's Best Song	"Bubble Butt" (with Major Lazer, Bruno Mars and Mystic)	Nominated
2014	World Music Awards	World's Best Video	"Bubble Butt" (with Major Lazer, Bruno Mars and Mystic)	Nominated
2014	World Music Awards	World's Best Song	"Wait for a Minute" (with Justin Bieber)	Nominated
2014	World Music Awards	World's Best Video	"Wait for a Minute" (with Justin Bieber)	Nominated
2014	World Music Awards	World's Best Album	Hotel California	Nominated
2014	World Music Awards	World's Best Song	"Loyal" (with Chris Brown and Lil Wayne)	Nominated
2014	World Music Awards	World's Best Video	"Loyal" (with Chris Brown and Lil Wayne)	Nominated
