= Wait for a Minute =

2013 single by Tyga and Justin Bieber

Single by Tyga and Justin Bieber
- Released: October 22, 2013
- Recorded: 2013
- Genre: Hip hop; hyphy; pop rap
- Length: 3:26
- Label: Young Money; Cash Money; Republic
- Songwriters: Michael Stevenson; Justin Bieber; Brandon Green; Jess Jackson
- Producer: Maejor

Tyga singles chronology
"Show You" (2013)	"Wait for a Minute" (2013)	"Iz U Down" (2013)

Justin Bieber singles chronology
"Hold Tight" (2013)	"Wait for a Minute" (2013)	"Recovery" (2013)

Music video
- "Wait for a Minute" on YouTube

"Wait for a Minute" is a song by American rapper Tyga and Canadian singer Justin Bieber. The song was released as the intended first single from Tyga's 2015 album The Gold Album: 18th Dynasty, however was ultimately left off the final tracklist. The song is produced by Maejor.

== Background ==
"He's in this transition period," said Tyga of his collaborator. "I felt like when me and Chris Brown did 'Deuces,' it was like a moment. I feel like this would be a big moment for both of us with this song." The song is produced by Maejor Ali and was premiered on October 21. The song was then released for digital download on October 22, 2013 Then on October 29, 2013, it was serviced to rhythmic contemporary radio in the US.

== Music video ==
The music video was shot on November 14, 2013 in Long Beach, California. " The video premiered on Access Hollywood on December 19, 2013, and was later released on Vevo and Tyga's YouTube channel. It was directed by Krista Liney.

== Chart performance ==
Wait for a Minute debuted and peaked at number 68 on the US Billboard Hot 100 chart, selling 68,000 digital downloads in its first week, according to Nielsen SoundScan. On March 19, 2020, the single was certified gold by the Recording Industry Association of America (RIAA) for combined sales and album-equivalent units over 500,000 units in the United States.

The single also charted on French Singles Chart and in the United Kingdom due to strong digital download sales. It debuted on the French Singles Chart at number 103. In October 2013, it debuted at number 41 on the UK Singles Chart. The song also debuted at number 34 on the Belgian Ultratop singles chart. The song debuted at number 31 on the Netherlands Top 100 and at number 45 in Spain. It debuted at number 47 on the Canadian Hot 100 and number 6 in Denmark.

== Track listing ==
Digital download
No.	Title	Length
1.	"Wait for a Minute" (with Justin Bieber)	3:26

== Charts ==
Chart (2013)	Peak position
Austria (Ö3 Austria Top 40)	50
Belgium (Ultratop 50 Flanders)	34
Belgium (Ultratop Flanders Urban)	8
Denmark (Tracklisten)	6
France (SNEP)	103
Canada Hot 100 (Billboard)	47
Germany (GfK)	63
Netherlands (Single Top 100)	31
Spain (Promusicae)	45
Switzerland (Schweizer Hitparade)	43
UK Singles (Official Charts)	41
US Billboard Hot 100	68
US Hot R&B/Hip-Hop Songs (Billboard)	24

== Certifications ==
Region	Certification	Certified units/sales
Brazil (Pro-Música Brasil)	Gold	30,000^{‡}
United States (RIAA)	Gold	500,000^{‡}
^{‡} Sales+streaming figures based on certification alone.

== Release history ==
Region	Date	Format	Label
Canada	October 21, 2013	Digital download	Young Money; Cash Money; Republic
United States	October 21, 2013	Digital download	Young Money; Cash Money; Republic
United Kingdom	October 21, 2013	Digital download	Young Money; Cash Money; Republic
United Kingdom	October 31, 2013	Urban contemporary radio	Young Money; Cash Money; Republic
