= NSFW (Tyga album) =

Studio album by Tyga
- Released: February 6, 2025
- Genre: Hip-hop
- Length: 46:07
- Labels: Last Kings; Empire
- Producers: ADP; Chambers; Diego Ave; DJ Swish; DTP; Extendo; KanielTheOne; Lee Major; Man Man; Mike Crook; Pliznaya; Samantha Henry; Scum Beatz; Sean Momberger; Sorry Jaynari; Tyga; Verrsaucy; Yume; Zac Brunson

Tyga chronology
| Hit Me When U Leave the Klub: The Playlist (2023) | NSFW (2025) | Starface (2026) |

Singles from NSFW
- 1. "Slave" Released: December 6, 2024; 2. "Pop It Off" Released: January 24, 2025

NSFW is the eighth studio album by American rapper Tyga. It was released on February 7, 2025, by Tyga's own label Last Kings Records and Empire Distribution. It contains guest appearances from Mike Sherm, Big Sean, Flo Milli, Lil Wayne, Shenseea, Cher, Lil Tjay, and Ty Dolla Sign. Production was handled by various record producers including Lee Major, Sean Momberger, Diego Ave and DJ Swish. It was originally intended to be released on January 31, 2025, but was eventually pushed back for February 7, 2025. It was supported by the singles "Slave" and "Pop It Off".

== Background ==
On December 6, 2024, Tyga released the first single from the album, "Slave", which samples "I'm a Slave 4 U" by Britney Spears.

On December 19, 2024, he revealed the cover, title and release date for the album.

On January 24, 2025, he released the second single from the album, "Pop It Off", which features Lil Wayne.

On February 7, 2025, he released the album, his first solo release since June 2019.

== Track listing ==
NSFW track listing
| No. | Title | Writer(s) | Producer(s) | Length |
|---|---|---|---|---|
| 1. | "It Ain't Safe" | Michael Stevenson; John Sammis | DJ Swish | 2:09 |
| 2. | "Adrenaline" | Stevenson | DJ Swish; Crook; Scum Beatz; Verrsaucy; Extendo | 2:13 |
| 3. | "GFU" (with Mike Sherm) | Stevenson; Michael Sherman | DJ Swish; Sorry Jaynari; Mike Crook | 3:05 |
| 4. | "Dancin Like Iz Pop" | Stevenson; Tyrone Mehdiz; Sammis; Dounia Aznou | Yume | 3:23 |
| 5. | "Underdawg" | Stevenson; Sammis | DJ Swish | 2:05 |
| 6. | "Gone" | Stevenson; Avril Lavigne; Butch Walker | Pliznaya | 2:22 |
| 7. | "Dumb" (with Big Sean and Flo Milli) | Stevenson; Sean Anderson; Tamia Carter; Russell Simmons; Darryl McDaniels; Joseph Ward | Sean Momberger; Lee Major; DJ Swish; ADP | 2:15 |
| 8. | "Pop It Off" (with Lil Wayne) | Stevenson; Dwayne Carter | Pliznaya; Tyga | 3:10 |
| 9. | "Magnetic" (with Shenseea) | Stevenson; Chinsea Lee | Tyga; Samantha Henry | 2:43 |
| 10. | "Find Out" | Stevenson | Henry; Man Man; Tyga | 3:00 |
| 11. | "Found Someone" (with Cher) | Stevenson; Michael Bolton; Mark Mangold | Pliznaya | 3:17 |
| 12. | "My Turn" | Stevenson | Mike Crook; DJ Swish | 2:25 |
| 13. | "Twiami" | Stevenson | DJ Swish; Chambers; Diego Ave | 2:30 |
| 14. | "Stripper Girl" | Stevenson; Sammis; Nicholas Lora | Samantha Henry; Yume; Tyga | 2:42 |
| 15. | "Whodie" (with Lil Tjay) | Stevenson; Tione Merritt; Sammis | DTP | 2:54 |
| 16. | "Popstar Shawty" (with Ty Dolla Sign) | Stevenson; Tyrone Griffin; Sammis; Turrell Sims; Mehdiz | Yume; KanielTheOne; Zac Brunson | 3:36 |
| 17. | "Slave" | Stevenson; Pharrell Williams; Chad Hugo | Pliznaya; DJ Swish | 2:18 |
| Total length: | | | | 46:07 |

Sample credits

- "Gone" contains a sample from "When You're Gone", written by Avril Lavigne and Butch Walker, as performed by Avril Lavigne.
- "Dumb" contains a sample from "Dumb Girl", written by Russell Simmons, Darryl McDaniels and Joseph Simmons, as performed by Run-DMC.
- "Found Someone" contains a sample from "I Found Someone", written by Michael Bolton and Mark Mangold, as performed by Cher.
- "Slave" contains a sample from "I'm a Slave 4 U", written by Chad Hugo and Pharrell Williams, as performed by Britney Spears.
