= Show You =

Single by Tyga featuring Future

from the album Hotel California
- Released: August 27, 2013
- Recorded: 2012
- Genre: Hip hop; R&B
- Length: 4:29
- Label: Young Money; Cash Money; Republic
- Songwriters: Micheal Stevenson; Nayvadius Cash; Jess Jackson; Noel Fisher; Brian Soko
- Producer: Detail

Tyga singles chronology
"Bubble Butt" (2013)	"Show You" (2013)	"Wait for a Minute" (2013)

Future singles chronology
"Loveeeeeee Song" (2013)	"Show You" (2013)	"I Wanna Be with You" (2013)

Music video
- "Show You" on YouTube

"Show You" is a song by American rapper Tyga featuring fellow American rapper Future. It was released on August 27, 2013, by Young Money and Cash Money as the third official single from the former's third studio album Hotel California (2013). The song is produced by Detail.

== Music video ==
On July 23, 2013, the music video for "Show You" featuring Future premiered on 106 & Park. "Show You" was released to Rhythmic contemporary radio, as the album's third official single on August 27, 2013. The music video was directed by Colin Tilley.

== Track listing ==
Digital single

No.	Title	Writer(s)	Producer(s)	Length
1.	"Show You" (featuring Future)	M. Stevenson, Nayvadius Wilburn, N. Cash, J. Jackson, N. Fisher, B. Soko	Detail	4:29

== Charts ==
Chart (2013)	Peak position
US Bubbling Under R&B/Hip-Hop Singles (Billboard)	5

== Release history ==
Country	Date	Format	Label
United States	August 27, 2013	Rhythmic contemporary	Young Money, Cash Money, Republic
