= Bubble Butt =

2013 single by Major Lazer featuring Bruno Mars, Tyga and Mystic

Single by Major Lazer featuring Bruno Mars, 2 Chainz, Tyga and Mystic

from the album Free the Universe
- Released: May 24, 2013
- Recorded: 2012
- Studio: Chalice Recording (Los Angeles, California)
- Genre: EDM; hip hop; dancehall
- Length: 3:47 (album); 3:27 (remix)
- Label: Various: Because Music; Mad Decent; ADA; Secretly Canadian
- Songwriters: Thomas Pentz; David Taylor; Bruno Mars; Michael Stevenson; Mystic; 2 Chainz
- Producers: Major Lazer; Valentino Khan

Major Lazer singles chronology
"Watch Out for This (Bumaye)" (2013)	"Bubble Butt" (2013)	"Scare Me" (2013)

Bruno Mars singles chronology
"Treasure" (2013)	"Bubble Butt (Remix)" (2013)	"Gorilla" (2013)

Tyga singles chronology
"For the Road" (2013)	"Bubble Butt" (2013)	"Show You" (2013)

Mystic singles chronology
"OK... Alright" (2006)	"Bubble Butt" (2013)

2 Chainz singles chronology
"Headband" (2013)	"Bubble Butt" (2013)	"Feds Watching" (2013)

Music video
- "Bubble Butt" on YouTube

"Bubble Butt" is a song by American electronic dance music trio Major Lazer featuring American singer-songwriter Bruno Mars and American rappers Tyga and Mystic from the trio's second studio album, Free the Universe (2013). It was written by Major Lazer members Diplo and Switch alongside the featured artists. The production was handled by Major Lazer and Valentino Khan. The remix was released as the album's fourth single on May 24, 2013, for digital download and appears on the album's extended version. The remix version also features verses from American rapper 2 Chainz. Musically, it is an electronic dance, hip hop, and dancehall track with lyrics implying that girls twerk and show off their giant buttocks.

"Bubble Butt" received mixed reviews from most critics. Some complimented its engaging sound and high energy, while others criticized its lyrical content and repetitious nature. "Bubble Butt" was Major Lazer's first commercial single to enter the Billboard Hot 100, peaking at number 56 and reached number eight on the Dance Club Songs chart. It has topped the charts in Lebanon and South Korea, and was certified gold by the Recording Industry Association of America (RIAA).

Eric Wareheim directed the song's music video. It depicts three young women in an apartment listening to seapunk music and taking pictures on their phones when a flying giantess lands next to their apartment and inflates their buttocks. The girls start to dance with their new butts after the walls of the apartment fall off and reveal a dance floor. Major Lazer played the song several times in their shows and in music festivals; they performed with 2 Chainz at Coachella, at Rock Werchter in 2013, and at the Roskilde Festival in 2014. The song was included in Major Lazer Essentials (2018), their first greatest hits compilation.

== Background and production ==
In an interview with Rolling Stone, Diplo explained "Bubble Butt" first began taking shape while he and Bruno Mars were working on material for No Doubt's last album. The producer "put a beat on" and Mars decided to rap. In another interview with Billboard, Ron Perry, President of Songs Publishing, explained that he wanted Diplo to sign with his company, and in order for this to happen, Diplo had requested that Perry get a "couple rappers" on the track. Perry enlisted 2 Chainz and Tyga on the recording in a matter of weeks. The original version was leaked on April 11, 2013.

"Bubble Butt" was initially written by Thomas Pentz, David Taylor, Mars, Michael Stevenson and Mystic. Production was handled by Major Lazer and Valentino Khan, while Chris Carmouche was in charge of mixing. Tyga recorded his verses at Chalice Recording Studios in Los Angeles, California. Dan Gerbarg and Howie Weinberg mastered the song at Howie Weinberg Mastering in Los Angeles. The single version features verses written and performed by 2 Chainz.

== Release and live performances ==
The single version was first made available by Because Music and Alternative Distribution Alliance via digital download on May 24, 29 and 31, 2013, in France, the United Kingdom, and Belgium respectively. The song was released for digital download in Italy on June 4. It was added to contemporary hit radio in the United Kingdom on July 29, by Because and Mad Decent. The remix for "Bubble Butt" was also issued via digital download on September 10 in Australia and October 4 in Singapore by Secretly Canadian and Warner Music Singapore, respectively. The latter has a different remix, including South Korean rappers G-Dragon and TOP. On December 11, 2013, Warner sent the song for radio airplay in Italy. The song is featured in the movie The Other Woman (2014). In 2018, the track was included in their greatest hits, Major Lazer Essentials.

The song was played several times at Major Lazer's shows, including at Coachella along with 2 Chainz, at Rock Werchter, and at Pukkelpop in 2013. It was also performed in 2014 at both the Moshcam concert and Roskilde Festival. When the track was played, women from the audience were invited to dance and twerk along. The performance included smoke canons, giant flags and zorb balls.

== Composition ==
"Bubble Butt" (Remix)
A 17-second sample of "Bubble Butt" (Remix), where Mars sings the chorus.

"Bubble Butt" is an electronic dance music (EDM), hip hop, and dancehall song. The "swaggering" and energetic number draws heavily from crunk. It was composed with the intention of being played at clubs. The song features squawking samples, heavy bass, "squiggly synths", clap beats, and bubble-popping sound effects, culminating with the "bub-bub-bubbing hook". Consequence of Sound's Derek Staples noted the resemblance between "Bubble Butt" and Major Lazer’s "Pon de Floor" (2009). Both songs feature lyrics seen as an anthem to twerking, "ass-shaking" and big buttocks. Mars repeats the chorus multiple times, "Bubble butt, bubble butt, turn around, stick it out, show the world you got a bubble butt", inspired by Rihanna's "Rude Boy" (2010), while Tyga raps "Damn, bitch, talk much?/I don't want interviews/Ha! I'm tryin' ta get into you/then make you my enemy". Mystic is found "lyrically wining circles around Bruno Mars and Tyga". Critics found the combination of the track lyrics and the catchy beat would make a "dance-floor hit".

== Critical reception ==
"Bubble Butt" has received mixed reviews from music critics. Sam Gould of MOBO complimented the "maddening beat" calling it an "infectiously naughty number which will have staggering effects on pretty much anyone within a 5-mile radius." AllMusic's David Jeffries called the song "fat", with the "Ying Yang Triplets" (Mars, Tyga, and Mystic) making sure that crunk is not over. Matthew Jacobs writing for HuffPost said it "is a bizarre electro-feminist anthem ... or just bizarre". He added, that the track is "splendidly absurd." Staples called "Bubble Butt" a "booty-bouncing anthem". Staples considered it an "essential track" that needed to be added, "to your club-banger playlist." Nate Patrin of Pitchfork praised Tyga's verse, naming it "the most shut-the-fuck-up verse of the year". Iyana Robertson of Vibe called the original song "addictive", while also praising the remix that included 2 Chainz verse, and predicted the track to be heavily played in clubs.

Puja Patel from Spin found "Bubble Butt" to be ridiculous and believed it was meant to become one of the "most gloriously overplayed songs of the summer". He compared its bass, hook and "catchiness" to Big Boi’s "Shutterbugg" (2010) and Jimmy Spicer’s "The Bubble Bunch" (1982). Kate Hutchinson from Drowned in Sound gave the song a mixed review, saying Mars's singing is not the "worst thing on the album", and noting that it features a "minimal hip-hop bounce...deceivingly intricate jungle of trilling and squawking samples", reminding listeners that Diplo is a "talented" producer. Killian Fox writing for The Observer found the track to be childish. NME's Lucy Jones found the song to be the worst on the album, as it repeats the chorus several times and has shallow lyrics.

The song found its way on several best-songs-of-the-year-lists. On the list of the 100 best songs of 2013 compiled by Rolling Stone, the song was placed at number 76. Critics called it a "joyfully jiggly and deliriously physical as its subject", dubbing it as a "twerk-enticer". PopMatters's Ryan Lathan ranked the song as the ninth-best dance single of 2013. Lathan dubbed the song as an "undeniably addictive song [which] had the desired effect of flooding dance floors everywhere this year." Carl Williott of Idolator considered it one of "the most mindlessly awesome song of the year." The single was one of Spin's 40th Best Songs of the mid-year of 2013. Jordan Sargent of Spin called it a hidden "gem" on Major Lazer's album, continuing by labelling it "a flagrantly fun and ridiculous track with the year's catchiest chorus". Ashley Lyle from Billboard called it one of the best hip-hop collaborations of Mars, a "fun twerk anthem".

== Commercial performance ==
In the United States, the original version of "Bubble Butt" peaked at number 56 on the week of August 24, 2013, spending a total of nine weeks on the Billboard Hot 100 and becoming Major Lazer's first song to reach the Hot 100. It was also the first Major Lazer track to enter the top ten on the Billboard Dance/Electronic Songs chart—reaching number eight. It peaked at number 13 on the US Rhythmic chart and reached number 17 on the Hot R&B/Hip-Hop Songs ranking. "Bubble Butt" further reached number 39 on the Billboard Dance Club Songs ranking. The Recording Industry Association of America (RIAA) certified it gold for track-equivalent sales of 500,000 units.

Following its remixed single release featuring 2 Chainz, "Bubble Butt" entered at its highest position, number 39, on the Australian Singles Chart. The remix also entered the Dutch Tipparade, peaking at number two, and reached number 27 on both the UK Indie and UK R&B charts. In Belgium, the album version of "Bubble Butt" peaked at number eight on the Ultratop Flanders Urban and number 24 on the Ultratop 50 Flanders charts. The same version reached number 12 on the Mega Dance Top 30 in Netherlands. "Bubble Butt" also notably peaked at number one in Lebanon. The Singapore version of the single charted at number one on the South Korean International Singles chart.

== Music video ==
=== Development and synopsis ===
An accompanying music video for "Bubble Butt" was directed by Eric Wareheim of comedy team Tim & Eric. Regarding the concept of the video, he explained that "in [his] perfect world Buttzilla would be Queen of all humans. She would set things right and focus our united attention on the most important thing in our short lives...BOOTY."

In the video, three young and thin women with blue hair reside in their apartment late at night, unenthusiastically listening to seapunk music and taking pictures on their mobile phones. A flying giantess with big buttocks subsequently lands next to their apartment. After spotting the women, she opens her mouth and hoses shoot out and slither into the apartment through the window, terrifying the women as the hoses poke into their buttocks and inflate them to an abnormal size. Following this, the apartment walls collapse to reveal the dance floor of a nightclub; the women start dancing with their new butts.

The giantess (referred to in the credits as "Buttzilla") blows bubbles that pop on the dancefloor and release large-butted women who also begin dancing. From then on, the video mainly focuses on three of the newly appeared women, who wear yellow pigtails, a ponytail and short hair, respectively. There is also a woman hanging from the ceiling by ribbons performing acrobatic moves. The aforementioned women dance throughout the rest of the video. At one point the acrobat woman explodes into confetti that rains down on the other women. The woman in pigtails continues dancing, unaware that one of the giantess' hoses is coming up behind her. The hose wraps around her waist and violently yanks her off the dance floor. The dancer struggles in the grip of the hose as she is pulled into the giantess' mouth and eaten. After swallowing the woman alive, Buttzilla flies away as the video ends.

=== Reception ===
Several publications dubbed the video as NSFW (not safe for work). Consequence of Sound Michael Roffman called the video a "sensational" and "bizarre masterpiece". Paper's Abby Schreiber thought she couldn't describe the video only using words, daring the reader to view it instead. Claire Lobenfeld writing for Stereogum and Music Feed's Sarah Bella found the video to be very colored and reggae-influenced. Bella dubbed the video as "totally insane" and as containing more shots of buttocks than an "American Apparel ad." Matthew Jacobs from HuffPost described the video as "an eccentric sci-fi rendering" and "splendidly absurd". Josh Modell of The A.V. Club described the video as a "saga about Buttzilla". Modell advised enjoying the video "responsibly" and advised the viewer to be of age. Idolator's Carl Williott found the video to be one of the most "mindlessly twerksome" in 2013, accompanied by a "highbrow fare" visual. However, Williott felt that the featured artists on the track should have been seen in the music video as well.

== Track listing ==
Digital download
No.	Title	Length
1.	"Bubble Butt" (Remix) (featuring Bruno Mars, 2 Chainz, Tyga & Mystic)	3:27

Digital download
No.	Title	Length
1.	"Bubble Butt" (featuring Bruno Mars, GD, TOP, Tyga & Mystic)	3:56

Digital download – French Version
No.	Title	Length
1.	"Bubble Butt" (featuring Bruno Mars, 2 Chainz, Tyga & Black M)	3:48

== Personnel ==
Credits adapted from the liner notes of Free The Universe.

- Thomas Pentz – songwriting
- David Taylor – songwriting
- Bruno Mars – lead vocals, songwriting
- Tyga – lead vocals, songwriting
- Mystic – lead vocals, songwriting
- 2 Chainz – lead vocals, songwriting
- Major Lazer – production
- Valentino Khan – production
- Chris Carmouche – mixing
- Dan Gerbarg – mastering
- Howie Weinberg – mastering

== Charts ==
=== Weekly charts ===
List of chart positions
Chart (2013)	Peak position
Australia (ARIA) 2 Chainz remix version	39
Belgium (Ultratop 50 Flanders)	24
Belgium (Ultratop Flanders Urban)	8
Belgium (Ultratip Bubbling Under Wallonia)	11
France (SNEP)	67
Lebanon (The Official Lebanese Top 20)	1
Netherlands (Single Top 100)	65
Netherlands (Dutch Tipparade) 2 Chainz remix version	2
Netherlands (Mega Dance Top 30)	12
South Korea International Singles (Gaon) GD & TOP remix version	1
UK Singles (Official Charts Company) 2 Chainz remix version	196
UK Hip Hop/R&B (Official Charts) 2 Chainz remix version	27
UK Indie (Official Charts) 2 Chainz remix version	27
US Billboard Hot 100	56
US Hot Dance/Electronic Songs (Billboard)	8
US Dance Club Songs (Billboard)	39
US Hot R&B/Hip-Hop Songs (Billboard)	17
US Rhythmic Airplay (Billboard)	13

=== Year-end charts ===
List of chart positions
Chart (2013)	Position
Belgium (Ultratop Flanders Urban)	26
US Hot Dance/Electronic Songs (Billboard)	19
US Hot R&B/Hip-Hop Songs (Billboard)	91

== Certifications ==
List of certifications
Region	Certification	Certified units/sales
United States (RIAA)	Gold	500,000^{‡}
^{‡} Sales+streaming figures based on certification alone.

== Release history ==
List of release history, showing region(s), date(s), format(s), version(s) and label(s)
Region	Date	Format	Version	Label	Ref.
France	May 24, 2013	Digital download	2 Chainz remix	Because	
United Kingdom	May 29, 2013	Digital download	2 Chainz remix	Alternative Distribution Alliance	
Belgium	May 31, 2013	Digital download	2 Chainz remix	Because	
Italy	June 4, 2013	Digital download	2 Chainz remix	Because	
United Kingdom	July 29, 2013	Contemporary hit radio	2 Chainz remix	Because; Mad Decent	
Australia	September 10, 2013	Digital download	2 Chainz remix	Secretly Canadian	
Singapore	October 4, 2013	Digital download	GD & TOP remix	Warner Singapore	
Italy	December 11, 2013	Radio airplay	2 Chainz remix	Warner Music Group	
