= Do My Dance =

Single by Tyga featuring 2 Chainz

from the album Well Done 3
- Released: October 2, 2012
- Recorded: 2012
- Genre: Hip hop
- Length: 3:31
- Label: Young Money; Cash Money; Republic
- Songwriters: Michael Stevenson; Tauheed Epps; David Doman; Christina Gandy-Rodgers
- Producer: David D.A. Doman

Tyga singles chronology
| "Live It Up" (2012) | "Do My Dance" (2012) | "Dope" (2013) |

2 Chainz singles chronology
| "Birthday Song" (2012) | "Do My Dance" (2012) | "Bandz a Make Her Dance" (2012) |

"Do My Dance" is a song by rapper Tyga featuring 2 Chainz, released on October 2, 2012, as the lead single from the rapper's mixtape, Well Done 3 (2012). It features uncredited hook performed by Christina Gandy-Rodgers, the then-girlfriend of the song's producer, D.A. Doman. Doman himself also provides background vocals.

== Track listing ==
Digital download
| No. | Title | Length |
|---|---|---|
| 1. | "Do My Dance" (featuring 2 Chainz) | 3:27 |

== Music video ==
The video was released at Vevo on October 2, 2012. As of January 2018, the video has over 35 million views on YouTube. Swizz Beatz makes a cameo appearance in the video.

== Charts ==
| Chart (2012) | Peak position |
|---|---|
| US Bubbling Under Hot 100 Singles (Billboard) | 11 |
| US Hot R&B/Hip-Hop Songs (Billboard) | 32 |
| US Hot Rap Songs (Billboard) | 22 |

== Certifications ==
| Region | Certification | Certified units/sales |
|---|---|---|
| United States (RIAA) | Gold | 500,000^{‡} |
^{‡} Sales+streaming figures based on certification alone.

== Release history ==
| Country | Date | Format | Label |
|---|---|---|---|
| United States | October 2, 2012 | Digital download | Young Money, Cash Money, Republic |
| United Kingdom | October 2, 2012 | Digital download | Young Money, Cash Money, Republic |
