= The Gold Album: 18th Dynasty =

Studio album by Tyga
- Released: June 23, 2015
- Recorded: 2014–2015
- Genre: Hip hop
- Length: 44:33
- Labels: Last Kings; EMPIRE
- Producers: Bedrock; Brian Soko; D.A.; DNYC3; Dupri; FKi; Jess Jackson; Mike Dean; Rasool Diaz; SAP; Soundz

Tyga chronology
Fan of a Fan: The Album (2015)	The Gold Album: 18th Dynasty (2015)	Fuk Wat They Talkin Bout (2015)

Singles from The Gold Album: 18th Dynasty
- 1. "Hollywood Niggaz" Released: May 19, 2015; 2. "Pleazer" Released: June 16, 2015

The Gold Album: 18th Dynasty (also commonly known as The Gold Album) is the fourth studio album by American rapper Tyga. It premiered exclusively on Spotify on June 23, 2015. The album serves as his first release on his independent record label Last Kings Records. The Gold Album failed to chart on the Billboard 200, and received generally mixed reviews from critics.

== Recording and production ==
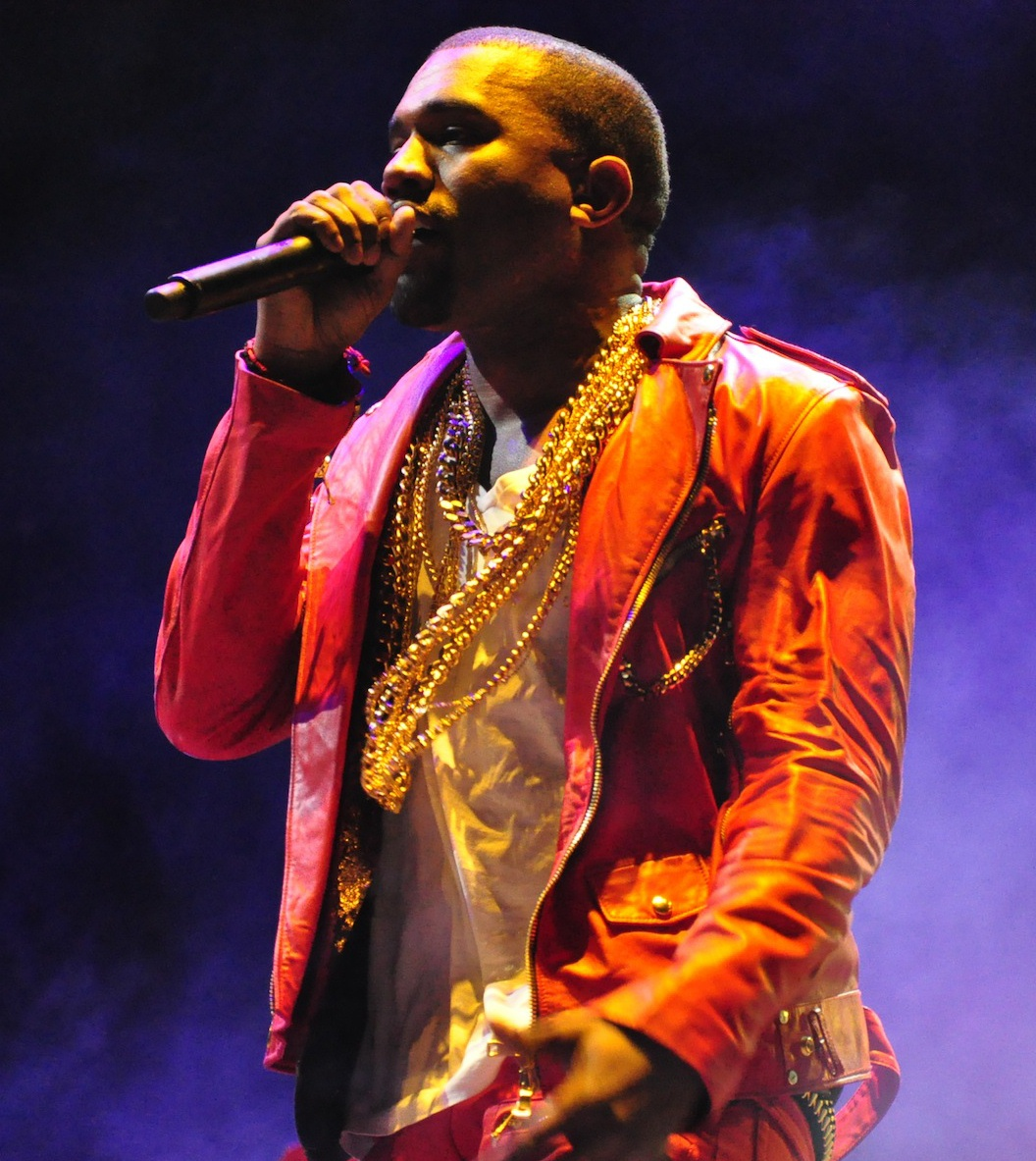
Kanye West was the executive producer of the project.

On May 1, 2014, Tyga made a tweet, stating that the project would be executively produced by Kanye West. The production on the album would be provided by Mike Dean, alongside his frequent collaborator Jess Jackson.

== Release ==
On January 8, 2015, the project was availably made for the pre-order on iTunes, including two promotional singles: "Make It Work" and "40 Mill" (with the production handled by West and Mike Dean) to be released on January 27, 2015. As of June 2015, these pre-order tracks were removed, however, and were not included in the album's final track listing. The mixtape differs from other Tyga projects as it was not released physically by CD or vinyl pressings, which could've contributed to the mixtape's lackluster commercial performance. In addition to that, some songs that Tyga intended to have on this project had to be removed: "Hookah" featuring Young Thug, "Wait for a Minute" with Justin Bieber, "We Don't Die", "Erryday", "40 Mill", "Real Deal", "Make It Work", and some unreleased collaborations with Future, Drake and Chris Brown were all not present on the album. The reason being Tyga's previous label was not allowing him to release them as they had ownership of the songs. This is why the track list was short and concise in terms of number of songs.

== Singles ==
The album's first announced single, "Wait for a Minute", was released on October 22, 2013. The song features a duet between Tyga and Canadian singer Justin Bieber, while the production was handled by Maejor. The album's second announced single, "Hookah", was released on April 9, 2014. The song features a guest appearance from American rapper Young Thug, while the production was handled by London on da Track. However the two singles ended up not being on the album.

On May 19, 2015, the lead single of the album was released, titled "Hollywood Niggaz". The second single "Pleazer" featuring guest appearance from American rapper Boosie Badazz, was released June 12, 2015, but neither of the singles from the album charted.

== Critical reception ==
Professional ratings
Aggregate scores
Source	Rating
Metacritic	45/100
Review scores
Source	Rating
HipHopDX	2/5 stars
Pitchfork	3.9/10
PopMatters	5/10
XXL	L (3/5)

At Metacritic, which assigns a normalized rating out of 100 to reviews from music critics, the project has received an average score of 45 based on 4 reviews, signifying "mixed or average reviews". In a negative review, Meaghan Garvey of Pitchfork wrote "Tyga doesn't even sound like he's having fun here; the prevailing mood is one of vague bitterness, directed at everyone, but particularly women." Garvey further lamented that the songs "Hookah", "Wait for a Minute", "Make It Work" and "40 Mill" were not part of the album's final track listing. In an average review, PopMatters said "the album is full of songs that falter either for a lack of a guiding beat or because of misguided lyrics that carry little purpose [...] On '4 My Dawgz', Lil Wayne delivers a painful-sounding few bars, describing his 'going crazy', which is an apt feeling after listening to the ten songs preceding it."

== Commercial performance ==
Following nearly a full week of streaming and three days of sales via iTunes, The Gold Album: 18th Dynasty failed to reach the Billboard 200; it sold only 2,200 copies during the tracking week. Tyga defended the album's low sales on Twitter, explaining that streaming was the release's primary focus. Track streams from the mixtape during the tracking week numbered around four million. Nevertheless, even with consumption from streaming included, the album's total equivalent album units count for the week numbered less than 5,000.

== Track listing ==
Credits adapted from album's liner notes.

The Gold Album: 18th Dynasty track listing
No.	Title	Writer(s)	Producer(s)	Length
1.	"Spitfire"	Michael Stevenson; Donte Blacksher; Mike Dean; Jess Jackson	DNYC3; Dean^{[a]}; Jackson^{[a]}	2:10
2.	"Muh Fucka" (featuring A.E.)	Stevenson; Alexander Edwards; Jackson	Bedrock; Jackson^{[a]}	3:01
3.	"Shaka Zulu"	Stevenson; Johnathan King; Jackson	SAP; Jackson^{[a]}	4:14
4.	"God Talk"	Stevenson; Kenneth Coby; Jackson	Soundz; Jackson^{[a]}	3:14
5.	"Hard for You"	Stevenson; Regis Bell; Dean; Jackson	Dupri; Dean^{[a]}; Jackson^{[a]}	3:14
6.	"Down for a Min"	Stevenson; King; Dean; Jackson	SAP; Dean^{[a]}; Jackson^{[a]}	4:13
7.	"Pure Luxury"	Stevenson; Bell; Dean; Jackson	Dupri; Dean^{[a]}; Jackson^{[a]}	4:59
8.	"Wham"	Stevenson; David Doman; Jackson	D.A.; Jackson^{[a]}	3:19
9.	"Pleazer" (featuring Boosie Badazz)	Stevenson; Markous Roberts, Jr.; Steven Bolden; Torrence Hatch; Dean; Jackson	FKi; Jackson^{[a]}	4:18
10.	"Hollywood Niggaz"	Stevenson; Jackson	Jackson	3:32
11.	"4 My Dawgs" (featuring Lil Wayne)	Stevenson; Dwayne Carter, Jr.; Rasool Diaz; Brian Soko; Jackson; Gerard McMahon; Mike Mainieri	Brian Soko; Rasool Diaz^{[a]}; Jackson^{[a]}	3:56
12.	"Bloodline"	Stevenson; Jackson	Jackson	4:23
Total length:				44:33

Notes

- "4 My Dawgs" was removed from streaming services.
- ^{^[a]} signifies a co-producer.

== Charts ==
Chart (2015)	Peak position
US Independent Albums (Billboard)	24
US Top R&B/Hip-Hop Albums (Billboard)	24

== Release history ==
Country	Date	Format	Label	Ref.
United States	June 23, 2015	Digital download	Last Kings	
United States	November 24, 2017	LP	Last Kings; EMPIRE	
