= Well Done 3 =

Mixtape by Tyga
- Released: August 19, 2012
- Recorded: April 13–August 2012
- Genre: Hip hop; R&B
- Length: 43:14
- Label: Young Money; Cash Money
- Producer: Cardiak; Hit-Boy; Tyler, the Creator; Sound M.O.B.; DJ Mustard; DJ Spinz; David D.A. Doman; Yung Ladd; Dupri; D. Will; Jay-Nari; Rick Hertz; Marsell on the Track; The Surf Club; J. Lacey; Roc & Mayne

Tyga chronology
#BitchImtheShit (2011)	Well Done 3 (2012)	187 (2012)

Singles from Well Done 3
- 1. "Do My Dance" Released: October 3, 2012; 2. "Ratchets" Released: December 4, 2012

Well Done 3 is a mixtape (a third installment of this whole series) by American rapper Tyga. It was released on August 19, 2012, by Young Money Entertainment and Cash Money Records. The mixtape features guest appearances from 2 Chainz, Honey Cocaine, a Brick Squad Monopoly member Joe Moses, Kirko Bangz, D-Lo, Game and Future. The mixtape received a diamond certification from its DatPiff website, with over 1,000,000 downloads.

The mixtape contains several freestyles, including Rick Ross's "Diced Pineapples" (from his sixth album God Forgives, I Don't), E-40's "Function" (from his sixteenth album The Block Brochure: Welcome to the Soil 2), as well as Kanye West's single "Mercy" (from G.O.O.D. Music's collaboration album Cruel Summer), 2 Chainz' "Riot" (from his mixtape T.R.U. REALigion and his debut album Based on a T.R.U. Story), his label-mate Nicki Minaj's "I Am Your Leader" (from her second album Pink Friday: Roman Reloaded) and Game's "I Remember" (in which later included on his fifth album Jesus Piece, featuring Young Jeezy and Future). On this track "I Remember", Jeezy's verse was replaced by Tyga's verse, making it his own song.

== Track listing ==
No.	Title	Producer(s)/Original instrumental	Length
1.	"No Luck"	DJ Mustard	2:56
2.	"Do My Dance" (featuring 2 Chainz)	David D.A. Doman	3:31
3.	"Wish"	Jay-Nari	3:08
4.	"Ayye Bitch"	"Function" (E-40 featuring YG, Iamsu and Problem)	1:08
5.	"Designer"	"Mercy" (Kanye West, Big Sean, Pusha T and 2 Chainz)	2:17
6.	"Diced Pineapples"	"Diced Pineapples" (Rick Ross featuring Wale and Drake)	3:37
7.	"Ready to Fuck"	"Drank In My Cup" (Kirko Bangz)	3:32
8.	"Riot" (featuring Honey Cocaine)	"Riot" (2 Chainz)	3:00
9.	"King Company" (featuring Honey Cocaine)	"I Am Your Leader" (Nicki Minaj featuring Rick Ross and Cam'Ron)	1:54
10.	"Ratchets (Remix)" (Joe Moses featuring Tyga)	DJ Mustard	2:54
11.	"Girls & Guitars" (featuring Kirko Bangz)	Roc & Mayne	3:22
12.	"Get Her Tho" (D-Lo featuring Tyga)	Dupri	2:41
13.	"Splatter"	"Skrung Owt" (Fam-Lay)	1:22
14.	"Switch Lanes" (featuring Game)	Laze & Royal; NiceBeatz	3:40
15.	"Out This Bitch" (featuring Kirko Bangz)	Happy P.; Kirko Bangz	4:04
16.	"I Remember" (featuring Game and Future)	Yung Ladd; Cool & Dre	3:14
Total length:			43:14
