= Jess Jackson (music producer) =

- Born: Jess Reed Jackson; 15 July 1980 (age 46); Hammersmith, London, England
- Genres: Hip hop; R&B; rock; pop; soul; EDM
- Occupations: Record producer, songwriter, disc jockey
- Instruments: Keyboards, guitar, piano
- Years active: 1994–present
- Labels: Jess Jackson Productions, JSKN, Last Kings
- Website: www.jessjackson.com

Jess Reed Jackson (born 15 July 1980) is an English record producer, songwriter, and disc jockey from Hammersmith, London. In addition to establishing his own production companies, Jess Jackson Productions and JSKN Music, Jackson secured a publishing deal with Last Kings Entertainment through fellow rapper Tyga —with whom he has worked closely. He is one half of the production duo, Active Minds with DJ Redz. Jackson has produced for artists such as Chris Brown, The Wanted, Pop Smoke, Esty, Nicki Minaj, Lil Twist, Busta Rhymes, and more.

== Early life ==
Jess Reed was born on 15 July 1980 in Hammersmith, London to David Reed and Lis Parrish. In the 1970s, David managed a book store called Equinox Bookshop, that was owned by Led Zeppelin's guitarist Jimmy Page.

== Career ==
In 1994, Jess acquired his step father's last name "Jackson" and started producing music in his bedroom, with his neighbour Simon Franks. In 1997, at the age of seventeen, he had released his third UK garage record, "Hobson's Choice", with DJ Redz as Active Minds. The song was an inspiration to the beginning of a new genre, "UK Garage". In 1999, Jackson got in a studio with singer Andrew Roachford released the single "24-7-365" to Sony Music. In 2001, Jackson was the resident DJ for the band, Patrick Alan and performed on stage every Monday night at London's exclusive celebrity night club, 10 Room. Jackson performed alongside Alicia Keys, Pharrell Williams, Sean Paul, Nas, Black Eyed Peas, Christina Aguilera, Justin Timberlake, Angie Stone, Lionel Richie, Estelle, plus many more. That same year, when Jackson was twenty-one, he was signed to Pure Milk Records. That's where he met up with an old classmate from ADT College, a guy named AC Burrell, who signed to Pure Milk as well. In 2003, Pure Milk Records closed down due to poor management. Months later, Jackson started songwriting when Pete Townshend lead guitarist of The Who signed Jackson to his publishing company Eel Pie Publishing as a record producer.

In 2004, Jackson joined Firin Squad productions as a remixer and record producer. He worked on remixes for 50 Cent, Joe, Kevin Lyttle, Nina Jayne. Also, Jackson began his acting career active by starring in a PlayStation commercial shot by director Joseph Kahn. In 2005, Jackson worked with Onyx member Fredro Starr in California and released underground mixtape material. In 2006, he relocated to Los Angeles and began working closer with US hip-hop record labels. In 2007, Jackson recorded with hip hop band The Knux signed to Interscope Records and played a Cockney British Drug Dealer in a skit on their album, Remind Me in 3 Days. Also, Jackson and DJ Cobra partnered up in business by providing DJ's worldwide with exclusive access to club mashups for songs like "I Kissed a Girl" by Katy Perry, "Pony" by Ginuwine, and more. Throughout 2008 and 2009, Jacksons music is featured on many MTV reality TV shows. Jacksons voice in a British cockney accent is also featured on the track "Sayin This" by Tyga. Throughout 2011 and 2014, Jackson has been an executive producer for most of Tyga's mixtapes and albums. In 2013, Jackson produced the single, "Killing Your Ills" by Last Kings Entertainment artist, Esty featuring Tyga. In October 2014, Jackson co-produced Tyga's single, "40 Mill" with Kanye West, Mike Dean, and Dupri. The track is supposed to appear on The Gold Album: 18th Dynasty. Jackson co-produced rapper Pop Smoke's hit single, "For the Night", released in July 2020.
