= 2012 in hip-hop =

This article summarizes the events, album releases, and album release dates in hip-hop for the year 2012.

== Events ==
=== January ===
- Cory Gunz was arrested for possessing a loaded firearm.
- Azealia Banks signs to Universal Music.

=== February ===
- Kanye West won four Grammy Awards for Best Rap Song, Best Rap Album, Best Rap Performance, and Best Rap/Sung Collaboration, while Jay-Z and Kid Cudi won one each.
- Philthy Rich and two more people are arrested for supposedly owning a stolen Bentley vehicle.
- Tyga's major label debut album, Careless World: Rise of the Last King, was thought to be taken off the shelves due to an unauthorized usage of Martin Luther King, Jr.'s last speech. However, the issue is resolved, and the released date would go as planned.
- Bizarre left D12, leaving the group with five members.

=== March ===
- T.I. announces he signed Iggy Azalea, Chip, and Trae tha Truth to Grand Hustle Records.
- An SUV that Young Buck was a passenger in was shot at 11 times, but the rapper was not injured.
- MTV announces that Top Dawg Entertainment, a Los Angeles-based independent record label, had closed a joint venture deal with Interscope Records and Aftermath Entertainment. Under the new deal, Black Hippy member Kendrick Lamar's debut studio album, good kid, m.A.A.d city would be jointly released via Top Dawg/Interscope/Aftermath, while releases from the rest of Black Hippy (Ab-Soul, Jay Rock, and Schoolboy Q) would be distributed via Top Dawg/Interscope.
- Tyga's tour bus was shot at several times in Omaha, Nebraska, but the rapper was not injured.
- Kon Artis left D12, leaving the group with four members.

=== April ===
- Q-Tip announced his signing to Kanye West's G.O.O.D. Music/Def Jam.
- At this year's Coachella Music Festival, Dr. Dre and Snoop Dogg surprised the audience with a performance from 2Pac via hologram image.
- Former D12 member Mr. Porter announced his debut album.

=== May ===
- Adam Yauch (known as MCA), one of the founding members of Beastie Boys, died on May 4, aged 47.
- Young Buck was sentenced to prison for two months for gun possession.
- 2 Chainz was arrested for possessing a set of brass knuckles.
- In the song "Exodus 23:1", Pusha T insulted Cash Money Records, igniting a beef between him and Lil Wayne.
- Lupe Fiasco and Pete Rock's beef over the former remaking the latter's beat from "T.R.O.Y." for "Around My Way (Freedom Ain't Free)."
- Eminem announced that he is working on his eighth studio album.
- Shawn Chrystopher signs to Timbaland Productions.

=== June ===
- Nicki Minaj was pulled from performing at New York's Hot 97 Summer Jam because on-air DJ Peter Rosenberg called her song "Starships" bullshit, wack and corny.
- Lil Phat died on June 7 after he was shot multiple times in Atlanta.
- MTV reported that on June 16, Chicago rapper Chief Keef was signed to Interscope Records.
- At W.i.P. nightclub, a scuffle between Chris Brown and Drake was placed under investigation, though both artists claimed they had nothing to do with the violent incident that left many bloodied and injured. Philly rapper Meek Mill, who was also present during the late-night fight, came forward to back up their claims that they did not instigate the bottle-throwing brawl.
- Funk Volume signs Jarren Benton.

=== July ===
- Member of OFWGKTA Frank Ocean published an open letter on his Tumblr blog on July 4, recounting unrequited feelings he had for a man when he was 19 years old, citing it as his first true love. Members of the hip-hop industry generally responded positively to the announcement. Business magnate Russell Simmons wrote a short congratulatory article in Global Grind, and support was voiced by Beyoncé and Jay-Z. Tyler, the Creator also tweeted his support for Ocean, along with other members of OFWGKTA.
- Rockie Fresh signs to Maybach Music Group.

=== August ===
- Philthy Rich is shot three times but is released from a hospital the day after the shooting.
- Hip-hop executive Chris Lighty, founder of Violator and who managed and worked with artists like 50 Cent and Busta Rhymes, was found dead due to possible suicide.
- Freeway signs to Babygrande Records.
- Max B's appeal from his 75-year prison sentence that occurred in 2009 was denied.
- Rittz signs to Strange Music.
- Caskey signs to Cash Money.

=== September ===
- Lil Wayne officially passed Elvis Presley with the most appearances on the Billboard 100, with 109 (42 as a solo artist, 67 as a featured artist).
- Jay-Z announced the opening of the Barclays Center with a concert, including a hologram of Notorious B.I.G. and a new verse.
- 50 Cent and Fat Joe ended their feud, appearing on stage together at the 2012 BET Hip Hop Awards. Also at the BET Hip Hop Awards, 50 Cent and his crew G-Unit were involved in a fight with Maybach Music Group's member Gunplay.

=== October ===
- After problems at BET Hip Hop Awards, 50 Cent began a feud with French Montana, after the rapper commented negatively about 50 Cent's career. G-Unit's boss responded on Twitter calling French Montana a "hoe".
- 50 Cent appeared in a video wearing Gunplay's chain of Maybach Music Group while bowling.
- Nelly was detained in Texas after cops find heroin and 10 pounds of weed on his tour bus.
- P. Diddy suffered injuries to his neck, ribs, and collarbone following a car accident on October 24.
- Lil Wayne suffered multiple seizures on a flight to Texas.

=== December ===
- Both Young Jeezy's label CTE (Corporate Thugz Entertainment) and Rick Ross's Maybach Music Group merge with Atlantic Records.
- Both Jay-Z and Kanye West each have six Grammy nominations for the 2013 Grammy Awards, Nas has four, Drake and 2 Chainz each have three, Andre 3000, Big Sean, Pusha T, Lil Wayne, and Wiz Khalifa each have two.
- The Notorious B.I.G. autopsy was leaked by the Los Angeles Police Department and published by TMZ. The Los Angeles Police Department apologized for the leak to Voletta Wallace and Biggie's family.
- On December 24, 2012, it was announced that Capital STEEZ, a close friend of Joey Badass and founder of Pro Era, died from a suspected suicide.

== Released albums ==
Release date	Artist	Album	Label	Notes	Ref
January 10	Ja Rule	Icon	Motown Records		
January 10	Prevail	SpaseFase	Battle Axe Records		
January 10	Yo Gotti	Live from the Kitchen	Polo Grounds Music, RCA Records	Debuted at No. 12 on the Billboard 200; Singles: "5 Star" and "We Can Get It On"	
January 14	Schoolboy Q	Habits & Contradictions	Top Dawg Entertainment	Debuted at No. 111 on the Billboard 200	
January 17	Koncept	Awaken	Soulspazm		
January 17	The Jacka	The Verdict	Siccness.net		
January 17	Tajai	Machine Language	Clear Label Records		
January 24	Gangrene	Vodka & Ayahuasca	Decon Records		
January 27	Lord Finesse	The Art of Diggin: Blue Note State of Mind (Mini LP Cardboard Gatefold) (Limited Edition)	Underboss Entertainment		
January 31	AraabMuzik	Instrumental University	Duke Productions		
January 31	Various	Giant Single: Profile Records Rap Anthology	Arista Records, Legacy Recordings, Sony Music		
February 12	Rapper Big Pooh	Sleepers: The Narcoleptic Outtakes	6 Hole, Caroline Distribution		
February 14	Busdriver	Beaus$Eros	Fake Four Inc.		
February 14	Curren$y	Muscle Car Chronicles	DD172		
February 14	M-Phazes	Phazed Out	Coalmine Records		
February 21	Chiddy Bang	Breakfast	Virgin Records, I.R.S. Records	Debuted at No. 5 on the Billboard 200	
February 21	Tyga	Careless World: Rise of the Last King	Young Money Entertainment, Cash Money Records, Republic Records, Island Records	Debuted at No. 4 on the Billboard 200; Singles: "Far Away", "Still Got It", "Rack City", and "Faded"	
February 24	Hodgy	untitled	Odd Future Records		
February 24	Noah23	Noah23 for Dummies			
February 28	Biz Markie	The Biz Never Sleeps (Re-Issue)	Traffic Entertainment Group		
February 28	C-Bo	Cali Connection	Ca$hville Records, West Coast Mafia Records, Black October Music		
February 28	Copywrite	God Save the King	Man Bites Dog Records		
February 28	Ja Rule	Pain Is Love 2	Mpire Music Group, Fontana Distribution	Debuted at No. 197 on the Billboard 200	
February 28	Lee Bannon	Fantastic Plastic	Plug Research		
February 28	Maino	The Day After Tomorrow	Hustle Hard, E1 Music, Atlantic Records	Debuted at No. 94 on the Billboard 200	
February 28	Opio	Vultures Wisdom, Vol. 2	Hieroglyphics Imperium Recordings		
February 28	Planet Asia	Black Belt Theatre	Green Streets Entertainment		
February 28	Shabaam Sahdeeq	Relentless Pt. 2	Hardtimes Records, Marvial Entertainment		
February 28	Stones Throw Records & Minimal Wave Records	The Minimal Wave Tapes Vol. 2	Stones Throw Records, Minimal Wave Records		
February 28	Too Short	No Trespassing	Dangerous Music	Debuted at No. 129 on the Billboard 200	
March 2	Kay One	Prince of Belvedair	Ersguterjunge	Debuted at No. 4 on the German album charts; Debuted at No. 4 on the Austrian album charts; Debuted at No. 7 on the Swiss album charts	
March 5	Big K.R.I.T.	4eva N a Day			
March 6	The Alchemist	Rapper's Best Friend 2	Decon Records, ALC Records		
March 6	Chaundon	The Jammington	Golden Era Music Inc.		
March 6	DJ Premier & Bumpy Knuckles	StOoDiOtYmE EP	Gracie Productions		
March 6	Flame	The 6th	Clear Sight Music		
March 6	Young Noble	Outlaw Rydahz Vol. 1	Outlaw Recordz		
March 9	Hilltop Hoods	Drinking from the Sun	Golden Era Records	Debuted at No. 1 on the ARIA Australian Top 50 Albums; Singles: "I Love It", "Speaking in Tongues", "Shredding the Balloon", "Rattling the Keys to the Kingdom"	
March 13	Blacastan	Master Builder Part II	Brick Records		
March 13	Boogie Down Productions	South Bronx Teachings: A Collection of Boogie Down Productions	B-Boy Records		
March 13	Del the Funky Homosapien	I Wish My Brother George Was Here (Re-Issue w/ Bonus Poster)	Elektra Records		
March 13	MC Shan	Q.B. O.G.: The Best of MC Shan	Cold Chillin', Traffic Entertainment Group		
March 13	Mr. Capone-E & Mr. Criminal	SS Til I Die: 13 Shots	Hi Power Entertainment, PMC Music Group		
March 13	Ras Kass	Greatest Misses	Mo Thugs Records		
March 13	Tech N9ne	Klusterfuk	Strange Music	Debuted at No. 12 on the Billboard 200	
March 20	Diggy Simmons	Unexpected Arrival	Atlantic Records	Debuted at No. 12 on the Billboard 200	
March 20	MGK	Half Naked & Almost Famous	Bad Boy Records, Interscope Records	Debuted at No. 42 on the Billboard 200	
March 20	Odd Future	The OF Tape Vol. 2	Odd Future Records, RED Distribution	Debuted at No. 5 on the Billboard 200	
March 20	Pep Love	Rigmarole	Clear Label Records		
March 26	E-40	The Block Brochure: Welcome to the Soil 1	Heavy On the Grind Entertainment, EMI	Debuted at No. 59 on the Billboard 200	
March 26	E-40	The Block Brochure: Welcome to the Soil 2	Heavy On the Grind Entertainment, EMI	Debuted at No. 58 on the Billboard 200; Single: "Function"	
March 26	E-40	The Block Brochure: Welcome to the Soil 3	Heavy On the Grind Entertainment, EMI	Debuted at No. 71 on the Billboard 200	
March 26	E-40	The Block Brochure: Welcome to the Soil 1, 2 & 3	Heavy On the Grind Entertainment, EMI	Debuted at No. 44 on the Billboard 200	
March 27	DJ Premier & Bumpy Knuckles	The Kolexxxion	Gracie Productions	Debuted at No. 195 on the Billboard 200	
March 27	Gift Of Gab	The Next Logical Progression			
March 27	Iron Solomon	Monster			
March 27	Lootpack	Soundpieces: Da Antidote (Re-Issue)			
March 27	Madlib	Medicine Show Number 01-13: The Brick (Limited Edition)			
March 27	¡Mayday!	Take Me To Your Leader	Strange Music	Debuted at No. 92 on the Billboard 200	
March 30	Bizarre	This Guy’s a Weirdo			
April 3	De La Soul's Plug 1 & Plug 2 Present...	First Serve		Debuted at No. 192 on the Billboard 200	
April 3	Laroo & Turf Talk	Sick-Wid-It: Block Ops			
April 3	Nicki Minaj	Pink Friday: Roman Reloaded		Debuted at No. 1 on the Billboard 200; Singles: "Starships", "Right By My Side", "Beez in the Trap", and "Pound the Alarm"; Certified Gold	
April 3	Obie Trice	Bottoms Up		Debuted at No. 113 on the Billboard 200	
April 3	Ras Kass	Spit No Evil			
April 9	Casey Veggies	Customized Greatly Vol. 3			
April 10	Ayatollah & Moka Only	Bridges			
April 10	J. Rawls	The Liquid Crystal Project 3			
April 10	Trip Lee	The Good Life		Debuted at No. 17 on the Billboard 200	
April 17	Blanco & Nipsey Hussle	Raw			
April 17	Future	Pluto		Debuted at No. 8 on the Billboard 200; Singles: "Tony Montana", "Magic", "Same Damn Time", and "Turn On the Lights"	
April 17	Mac Mall	The Rebellion Against All There Is			
April 20	Snoop Dogg	Stoner's EP		Debuted at No. 167 on the Billboard 200	
April 24	Chuuwee	Crown Me King			
April 24	Death Grips	The Money Store		Debuted at No. 130 on the Billboard 200	
April 24	Mickey Avalon	Loaded		Debuted at No. 137 on the Billboard 200	
April 24	Prozak	Paranormal		Debuted at No. 90 on the Billboard 200	
April 24	Reks	Straight, No Chaser			
April 24	Saukrates	Season One			
April 24	Showbiz	Still Diggin' Volume 1			
April 24	Yukmouth	Half Baked			
May 1	Apollo Brown & O.C.	Trophies			
May 1	B.o.B	Strange Clouds		Debuted at No. 5 on the Billboard 200; Singles: "Strange Clouds", "So Good", and "Both of Us"	
May 1	Blockhead	Interludes After Midnight			
May 1	DeStorm Power	Be Careful			
May 8	Big K.R.I.T.	Return of 4Eva (Deluxe Edition)			
May 8	I Self Devine	The Sounds Of Low Class Amerika			
May 8	Pitbull	Original Hits		Debuted at No. 134 on the Billboard 200	
May 8	Punchline & DJ Soulclap	Underground Superstars			
May 8	The Jacka	The Sentence			
May 11	Ab-Soul	Control System		Debuted at No. 91 on the Billboard 200	
May 15	J. Rocc	Taster's Choice Vol. 6			
May 15	Joe Budden	Mood Muzik: The Box Set			
May 15	Killer Mike	R.A.P. Music		Debuted at No. 82 on the Billboard 200	
May 15	Krizz Kaliko	Kickin' and Screamin'		Debuted at No. 43 on the Billboard 200	
May 15	Psycho Realm	Psycho Realm Presents Sick Jacken and Cynic: Terror Tapes 2			
May 22	Casual	He Still Think He Raw			
May 22	Devin the Dude	Seriously Trippin			
May 22	El-P	Cancer for Cure		Debuted at No. 69 on the Billboard 200	
May 22	J57	2057			
May 22	J57	The Ports			
May 22	Tha Chill	Chillafornia			
May 25	J Dilla	Dillatroit			
May 29	Azealia Banks	1991		Debuted at No. 133 on the Billboard 200	
May 29	Chuuwee	Wild Style			
May 29	Doseone	G Is for Deep			
May 29	Travis Porter	From Day 1		Debuted at No. 16 on the Billboard 200; Singles: "Bring It Back", "Make It Rain", "Ayy Ladies"	
June 1	Young Buck & Savion Saddam	Salute to the Streetz			
June 5	Big K.R.I.T.	Live from the Underground		Debuted at No. 5 on the Billboard 200	
June 5	Bigg Jus	Machines That Make Civilization Fun			
June 5	Curren$y	The Stoned Immaculate		Debuted at No. 8 on the Billboard 200	
June 5	Cypress Hill & Rusko	Cypress X Rusko			
June 5	DJ Shadow	Total Breakdown: Hidden Transmissions From The MPC Era, 1992–1996			
June 5	Kool Keith	Love and Danger			
June 5	Nottz	In My Mind			
June 5	Oh No	OhNoMite			
June 5	Rahlo	K.I.C.K. P.U.S.H.			
June 11	Pouya	Fuck It			
June 12	Diplo	Express Yourself EP			
June 12	J Dilla	Rebirth of Detroit			
June 12	Kid Ink	Up & Away		Debuted at No. 20 on the Billboard 200	
June 12	Oddisee	People Hear What They See			
June 12	SpaceGhostPurrp	Mysterious Phonk			
June 12	Stevie Stone	Rollin' Stone		Debuted at No. 73 on the Billboard 200	
June 12	Waka Flocka Flame	Triple F Life: Fans, Friends & Family		Debuted at No. 10 on the Billboard 200; Singles: "Round of Applause", "I Don't Really Care", and "Get Low"	
June 12	Wordsworth	The Photo Album			
June 19	Beautiful Eulogy	Satellite Kite			
June 19	Del the Funky Homosapien & Parallel Thought	Attractive Sin			
June 19	House Shoes	Let It Go			
June 19	Juvenile	Rejuvenation			
June 19	Lil Wyte	Still Doubted?			
June 19	Pastor Troy	The Last Outlaw			
June 19	Smoke DZA	Rugby Thompson			
June 26	Eminem	Curtain Call: The Hits (Import)			
June 26	Large Professor	Professor @ Large			
June 26	Lil Scrappy	Tha Gru$tle			
June 26	Maybach Music Group	Self Made Vol. 2		Debuted at No. 4 on the Billboard 200	
June 26	Open Mike Eagle	4NML HSPTL			
June 26	XV	The Awesome EP			
June 26	Flo Rida	Wild Ones		Debuted at No. 14 on the Billboard 200; Singles: "Good Feeling", "Wild Ones", "Whistle", and "I Cry"	
July 3	C-Bo	Orca			
July 3	King Magnetic	Everything's a Gamble Volume 3			
July 3	Prodigy	H.N.I.C. 3		Debuted at No. 123 on the Billboard 200	
July 3	Tha Dogg Pound	Doggy Bag			
July 3	Young Zee & Mr. Green	One Crazy Weekend			
July 4	Bones	WhiteRapper			
July 6	Cro	Raop		Debuted at No. 1 on the German album charts; Debuted at No. 1 on the Austrian album charts; Debuted at No. 7 on the Swiss album charts	
July 10	Aesop Rock	Skelethon		Debuted at No. 21 on the Billboard 200	
July 10	Blanco & Yukmouth	Cookies 'n Cream			
July 10	Freddie Gibbs & Madlib	Shame			
July 13	Public Enemy	Most of My Heroes Still Don't Appear on No Stamp			
July 17	8Ball	Life's Quest		Debuted at No. 116 on the Billboard 200	
July 17	KB	Weight & Glory		Debuted at No. 34 on the Billboard 200	
July 17	Masta Ace	MA Doom: Son of Yvonne			
July 17	Nas	Life Is Good		Debuted at No. 1 on the Billboard 200	
July 17	Snowgoons	Snowgoons Dynasty			
July 17	Tanya Morgan	You & What Army? (Retail)			
July 17	The Alchemist	Russian Roulette			
July 24	Big Shug	I.M. 4-EVA			
July 24	Blu & Exile	Maybe One Day			
July 24	GZA	Liquid Swords (Box Set)			
July 24	Lloyd Banks	V.6: The Gift			
July 24	Rasco	United Fakes of America			
July 24	Reks & Numonics	REBELutionary			
July 31	2nd II None	Infinite			
July 31	D-Shot	Ghetto			
July 31	La Coka Nostra	Masters of the Dark Arts			
July 31	Necro	The Murder Murder Kill Kill EP			
July 31	Rick Ross	God Forgives, I Don't		Debuted at No. 1 on the Billboard 200; Singles: "Touch'N You" and "Diced Pineapples"; Certified Gold	
August 7	Kokane & Traffik	The New Frontier			
August 7	¡Mayday!	Thrift Store Halos			
August 13	Beedie	Above the Weather			
August 14	2 Chainz	Based on a T.R.U. Story		Debuted at No. 1 on the Billboard 200; Singles: "No Lie", "Birthday Song", and "I'm Different"; Certified Gold	
August 14	Block McCloud	Four Walls			
August 14	Insane Clown Posse	The Mighty Death Pop!			
August 14	Kottonmouth Kings	Mile High			
August 14	Strong Arm Steady & Statik Selektah	Stereo Type			
August 20	JJ Doom	Key to the Kuffs			
August 21	Busta Rhymes	Year of the Dragon			
August 21	DJ Khaled	Kiss the Ring		Debuted at No. 4 on the Billboard 200; Singles: "Take It to the Head" and "I Wish You Would"	
August 21	Mistah F.A.B. & I-Rocc	Face Off			
August 28	Beanie Sigel	This Time			
August 28	Ces Cru	13			
August 28	Keak da Sneak	Cheddar Cheese I Say			
August 28	Madchild	Dope Sick			
August 28	Rapsody	The Idea of Beautiful			
August 28	Slaughterhouse	Welcome to: Our House		Debuted at No. 2 on the Billboard 200; Single: "My Life"	
August 28	TobyMac	Eye on It		Debuted at No. 1 on the Billboard 200	
August 28	Torae	Off The Record: The EP			
September 2	Bones	TypicalRapShit			
September 4	Blu & Exile	Give Me My Flowers While I Can Smell Them			
September 4	Brown Bag AllStars	Brown Label Pt. 2			
September 4	Lecrae	Gravity		Debuted at No. 3 on the Billboard 200	
September 11	Apathy	The Alien Tongue			
September 11	DMX	Undisputed		Debuted at No. 19 on the Billboard 200	
September 11	Kevlaar 7 & Woodenchainz	Sophisticated Movements			
September 18	Baby Bash & Lucky Luciano	Playamade Mexicanz			
September 18	Brother Ali	Mourning in America and Dreaming in Color		Debuted at No. 43 on the Billboard 200	
September 18	G.O.O.D. Music	Cruel Summer		Debuted at No. 2 on the Billboard 200; Singles: "Mercy", "Clique", "Cold", and "New God Flow"	
September 18	Homeboy Sandman	First of a Living Breed			
September 18	Kreayshawn	Somethin' 'Bout Kreay		Debuted at No. 104 on the Billboard 200	
September 18	Tech N9ne	E.B.A.H.		Debuted at No. 30 on the Billboard 200	
September 25	Blaq Poet	E.B.K. (EveryBodyKilla)			
September 25	Bumpy Knuckles & Statik Selektah	Ambition			
September 25	Chino XL	Ricanstruction: The Black Rosary			
September 25	Danny!	Payback			
September 25	Death Row Records	20 To Life: Rare And Dangerous Vol. 2			
September 25	Freddie Gibbs	Baby Face Killa			
September 25	Lupe Fiasco	Lupe Fiasco's Food & Liquor II: The Great American Rap Album Pt. 1		Debuted at No. 5 on the Billboard 200	
September 25	Murs & Fashawn	This Generation		Debuted at No. 146 on the Billboard 200	
September 29	Pouya	Don't Sleep on Me Hoe			
October 1	Death Grips	NØ LØVΣ DΣΣP WΠB			
October 2	DJ Drama	Quality Street Music		Debuted at No. 15 on the Billboard 200; Singles include: "We in This Bitch", "My Moment", and "So Many Girls"	
October 2	Kutt Calhoun	Kelvin		Debuted at No. 170 on the Billboard 200	
October 2	Prodigy	The Bumpy Johnson Album			
October 2	Skyzoo	A Dream Deferred		Debuted at No. 163 on the Billboard 200	
October 2	Z-Ro	Angel Dust		Debuted at No. 110 on the Billboard 200	
October 2	Zion I	Shadowboxing			
October 9	Jay-Z	Live In Brooklyn			
October 9	Macklemore & Ryan Lewis	The Heist		Debuted at No. 2 on the Billboard 200; Singles: "Thrift Shop", "Can't Hold Us", "Same Love"; Certified Gold	
October 9	MellowHype	Numbers		Debuted at No. 54 on the Billboard 200	
October 9	MGK	Lace Up		Debuted at No. 4 on the Billboard 200; Singles: "Wild Boy", "Invincible"	
October 9	Project Pat & Nasty Mane	Belly on Full 2			
October 9	Xzibit	Napalm		Debuted at No. 140 on the Billboard 200	
October 16	Blueprint	Deleted Scenes			
October 16	Dead Prez	Information Age			
October 16	Greydon Square	Type II : The Mandelbrot Set			
October 16	Prince Paul	Negroes on Ice			
October 16	K'naan	Country, God or the Girl			
October 22	Cold187um	The Only Solution		Debuted at No. 119 on the Billboard 200	
October 22	DJ Paul	A Person of Interest			
October 22	Kendrick Lamar	Good Kid, M.A.A.D City		Debuted at No. 2 on the Billboard 200; Singles include "The Recipe", "Swimming Pools (Drank)", "Poetic Justice", and "Bitch, Don't Kill My Vibe"; Certified Platinum	
October 22	RZA	The Man with the Iron Fists		Debuted at No. 31 on the Billboard 200	
October 22	Twiztid	Abominationz			
October 22	Vinnie Paz	God of the Serengeti		Debuted at No. 93 on the Billboard 200	
October 23	P.O.S	We Don't Even Live Here		Debuted at No. 47 on the Billboard 200	
October 23	Stevie Stone	Momentum		Debuted at No. 167 on the Billboard 200	
October 23	Styles of Beyond	Reseda Beach			
October 30	Ca$his	The Art of Dying			
October 30	Craig G	Ramblings of an Angry Old Man			
October 30	Lil Keke	Heart of a Hustla			
October 30	Meek Mill	Dreams & Nightmares		Debuted at No. 2 on the Billboard 200; Singles: "Amen", "Burn", and "Young & Gettin' It"	
October 30	Sean Price	Mic Tyson		Debuted at No. 58 on the Billboard 200	
October 30	Tech N9ne	Boiling Point		Debuted at No. 30 on the Billboard 200	
October 30	The Coup	Sorry to Bother You		Debuted at No. 194 on the Billboard 200	
November 2	Kerser	No Rest for the Sickest	Kerser N Nebs Records	Debuted at No. 15 on the ARIA Albums chart	
November 6	E-40 & Too Short	History: Function Music		Debuted at No. 59 on the Bills lboard 200	
November 6	E-40 & Too Short	History: Mob Music		Debuted at No. 66 on the Billboard 200	
November 6	Lil' Fame & Termanology	Fizzyology			
November 6	Mr. Muthafuckin eXquire	Power & Passion			
November 6	Saigon	The Greatest Story Never Told Chapter 2: Bread and Circuses		Debuted at No. 151 on the Billboard 200	
November 13	9th Wonder & Buckshot	The Solution		Debuted at No. 196 on the Billboard 200	
November 13	Apollo Brown & Guilty Simpson	Dice Game			
November 13	Murs & 9th Wonder	The Final Adventure			
November 13	Roc Marciano	Reloaded			
November 13	Yelawolf & Travis Barker	Psycho White		Debuted at No. 49 on the Billboard 200	
November 13	Young Noble	Son of God			
November 13	Sole	A Ruthless Criticism of Everything Existing			
November 19	Nicki Minaj	Pink Friday: Roman Reloaded – The Re-Up		Debuted at No. 26 on the Billboard 200; Singles: "Va Va Voom", "The Boys", "High School"	
November 19	Pitbull	Global Warming		Debuted at No. 14 on the Billboard 200; Singles: "Back in Time", "Get It Started", "Don't Stop the Party", and "Feel This Moment"	
November 20	Black C	Still Ruthless			
November 20	Jet Life	Jet World Order 2			
November 20	Rapper Big Pooh	Fat Boy Fresh Vol. 2			
November 20	Styles P	The World's Most Hardest MC Project			
November 21	GrandMilly & Bones	BLVCKNWHITE	TeamSESH		
November 27	Freeway	Diamond In the Ruff			
November 27	Future	Pluto 3D		Debuted at No. 63 on the Billboard 200	
November 27	Ghostface Killah & Sheek Louch	Wu Block		Debuted at No. 73 on the Billboard 200	
November 27	Krizz Kaliko	Neh'mind		Debuted at No. 161 on the Billboard 200	
November 27	Pac Div	GMB			
December 1	Bones	Bones			
December 4	Sadat X	Love, Hell or Right			
December 4	Daz Dillinger	Witit Witit			
December 4	Wiz Khalifa	O.N.I.F.C.		Debuted at No. 2 on the Billboard 200; Singles: "Work Hard, Play Hard", "Remember You"	
December 11	Big Boi	Vicious Lies and Dangerous Rumors		Debuted at No. 33 on the Billboard 200	
December 11	The Game	Jesus Piece		Debuted at No. 6 on the Billboard 200; Singles: "Celebration"	
December 11	Masta Killa	Selling My Soul			
December 11	Prozak	Nocturnal			
December 18	Chief Keef	Finally Rich		Debuted at No. 27 on the Billboard 200; Singles: "I Don't Like" and "Love Sosa"	
December 18	T.I.	Trouble Man: Heavy Is the Head		Debuted at No. 2 on the Billboard 200; Singles: "Go Get It", "Ball", "Hello"; Certified Gold	
December 21	Noah23	Wingfoot			
December 24	Skillz	Thoughts Become Things			
December 25	Bones	1Million Blunts			

== Highest first-week sales ==
List of top ten albums released in 2012 according to first-week home market sales, as of December 30, 2012
Number	Album	Artist	1st-week sales	1st-week position	Refs
1	Pink Friday: Roman Reloaded	Nicki Minaj	253,000	1	
2	Good Kid, M.A.A.D City	Kendrick Lamar	242,000	2	
3	God Forgives, I Don't	Rick Ross	218,000	1	
4	Cruel Summer	GOOD Music	205,000	2	
5	Trouble Man: Heavy Is the Head	T.I.	179,000	2	
6	Dreams & Nightmares	Meek Mill	165,000	2	
7	Life Is Good	Nas	149,000	1	
8	Based on a T.R.U. Story	2 Chainz	147,000	1	
9	O.N.I.F.C.	Wiz Khalifa	141,000	2	
10	Self Made Vol. 2	Maybach Music Group	98,000	4	

== Highest-charting singles ==
Singles which charted in the top ten of the Billboard Hot 100
Title	Artist	Peak position
"Whistle"	Flo Rida	1
"Gangnam Style"	Psy	2
"Good Feeling"	Flo Rida	3
"Starships"	Nicki Minaj	5
"Niggas In Paris"	Kanye West & Jay-Z	5
"Wild Ones"	Flo Rida featuring Sia	5
"I Cry"	Flo Rida	6
"Rack City"	Tyga	7
"Take Care"	Drake featuring Rihanna	7
"Young, Wild & Free"	Snoop Dogg & Wiz Khalifa featuring Bruno Mars	7
"Dance (A$$)"	Big Sean featuring Nicki Minaj	10
"Stereo Hearts"	Gym Class Heroes featuring Adam Levine	10
"Clique"	Kanye West, Jay-Z & Big Sean	12
"Mercy"	Kanye West, Big Sean, Pusha T & 2 Chainz	13
"Work Out"	J. Cole	13
"The Motto"	Drake featuring Lil Wayne	14
"Swimming Pools (Drank)"	Kendrick Lamar	17
"Work Hard, Play Hard"	Wiz Khalifa	17
"No Lie"	2 Chainz featuring Drake	24
"My Life"	50 Cent featuring Eminem & Adam Levine	27
"Bandz A Make Her Dance"	Juicy J featuring Lil Wayne & 2 Chainz	29
"Faded"	Tyga featuring Lil Wayne	33
"Pop That"	French Montana featuring Rick Ross, Drake & Lil Wayne	36
"My Homies Still"	Lil Wayne featuring Big Sean	38

== Highest critically reviewed albums ==
=== Metacritic ===
Number	Artist	Album	Average score	Number of reviews	Reference
1	Kendrick Lamar	Good Kid, M.A.A.D City	91	36 reviews	
2	Killer Mike	R.A.P. Music	85	27 reviews	
3	El-P	Cancer 4 Cure	84	39 reviews	
4	Ab-Soul	Control System	83	10 reviews	
5	Nas	Life Is Good	81	30 reviews	
6	Death Grips	The Money Store	81	27 reviews	
7	The Coup	Sorry to Bother You	80	15 reviews	
8	Quakers	Quakers	80	14 reviews	
9	Aesop Rock	Skelethon	79	27 reviews	
10	Big K.R.I.T.	Live from the Underground	78	24 reviews	

=== AnyDecentMusic? ===
Number	Artist	Album	Average score	Number of reviews	Reference
1	Kendrick Lamar	Good Kid, M.A.A.D City	8.6	21 reviews	
2	Death Grips	The Money Store	8.4	25 reviews	
3	El-P	Cancer 4 Cure	8.2	26 reviews	
4	Killer Mike	R.A.P. Music	8.1	17 reviews	
5	Plan B	Ill Manors	7.9	22 reviews	

== See also ==
- Previous Article: 2011 in hip-hop
- Next Article: 2013 in hip-hop
