= Travis Porter discography =

- Studio albums: 2
- Singles: 4
- Mixtapes: 17
- Guest appearances: 19

This is the discography of American hip hop group Travis Porter.

== Albums ==
=== Studio albums ===
List of albums, with selected chart positions and sales figures
Title	Album details	Peak chart positions			Sales	Certifications
Title	Album details	US	US R&B	US Rap	Sales	Certifications
From Day 1	Released: May 29, 2012; Label: Porter House Music Group, RCA; Format: CD, digital download, LP	16	2	2	US: 40,000	RIAA: Gold
Travy Estates: Back On Bulls**t	Released: October 29, 2021; Label: Porter House Music Group; Format: Digital download, streaming	—	—	—		

=== Extended plays ===
Year	Title
2011	Birthday Girl & You Don't Know About It: Released: July 22, 2011; Label: Porter House Music Group, Jive; Format: digital download

=== Mixtapes ===
List of mixtapes, with year released
Title	Album details
Who Is Travis Porter?	Released: 2009; Label: Self-released; Format: Digital download
I'm A Differenter	Released: 2009; Label: Self-released; Format: Digital download
I'm A Differenter 2	Released: August 6, 2009; Label: Self-released; Format: Digital download
Streets R Us (with Waka Flocka Flame)	Released: October 30, 2009; Label: Self-released; Format: Digital download
Traveeeeey	Released: December 10, 2009; Label: Self-released; Format: Digital download
Proud 2 Be A Problem	Released: May 18, 2010; Label: Self-released; Format: Digital download
I Am Travis Porter	Released: August 9, 2010; Label: Self-released; Format: Digital download
Differenter Gang (with MGK and FKi)	Released: September 1, 2010; Label: Self-released
Music Money Magnums	Released: February 2, 2011; Label: Self-released; Format: Digital download
Differenter 3	Released: September 29, 2011; Label: Self-released; Format: Digital download
Mr. Porter	Released: March 5, 2013; Label: Self-released; Format: Digital download
Music Money Magnums 2	Released: June 3, 2014; Label: Self-released; Format: Digital download
3 Live Krew	Released: April 15, 2015; Label: Self-released; Format: Digital download
S.A.Q.	Released: August 21, 2015; Label: Self-released; Format: Digital download
285	Released: January 18, 2016; Label: Self-released; Format: Digital download
Good Times (Strap Da Fool)	Released: February 3, 2016; Label: Self-released; Format: Digital download
Quickie EP	Released: December 25, 2017; Label: Self-released; Format: Digital download

== Singles ==
List of singles, with selected chart positions, showing year released and album name
Title	Year	Peak chart positions			Certifications	Album
Title	Year	US	US R&B	US Rap	Certifications	Album
"Make It Rain"	2010	92	15	9	RIAA: Gold	From Day 1
"Bring It Back"	2011	75	18	14	RIAA: 2× Platinum	From Day 1
"Ayy Ladies" (featuring Tyga)	2012	53	9	7	RIAA: 3× Platinum	From Day 1
"Ride Like That" (featuring Jeremih)	2012	—	63	—		From Day 1
"Don't We" (featuring Future)	2014	—	—	—		Music Money Magnums 2

== Other charted songs ==
List of songs, with selected chart positions, showing year released and album name
Title	Year	Peak chart positions		Album
Title	Year	US R&B/HH	US Rap	Album
"Go Shorty Go"	2010	51	22	Non-album singles
"You Don't Know 'Bout It"	2011	85	—	Birthday Girl & You Don't Know About It
"Aww Yea"	2012	79	—	From Day 1
"They Wanna Have Fun" (with Metro Boomin, Young Dro and Gucci Mane)	2025	42	—	A Futuristic Summa

== Guest appearances ==
List of non-single guest appearances, with other performing artists, showing year released and album name
Title	Year	Other artist(s)	Album
"Fall Out"	2010	Lil Jon	Crunk Rock
"Down"	2011	Jacquees	Round Of Applause
"Like A G"	2011	Kid Ink	Wheels Up
"Bad 2 The Bone"	2011	Dorrough	Silent Assassin
"Durr She Go"	2011	Juicy J	Rubba Band Business 2
"Hot Wheels"	2012	T.I., Young Dro	Fuck Da City Up
"Flex"	2012	Waka Flocka Flame, Slim Dunkin, D-Bo	Triple F Life: Fans, Friends & Family
"A-Town"	2012	Cyhi the Prynce, B.o.B	Ivy League Club
"Stonerz Night"	2012	Trigg Da Kidd	Trigganometry 101
"Real Nigga in the Building"	2012	DJ Drama, Kirko Bangz	Quality Street Music
"Make You Somebody"	2012	Sterling Simms, 2 Chainz, Tyga	Mary & Molly
"Do It" (Remix)	2012	Mykko Montana, Nelly, Gucci Mane, Yo Gotti, Jeremih, Nitti Beatz	Scorpio Season
"Dump Truck"	2012	E-40, Too $hort, Young Chu	History: Function Music
"Bubblicious"	2012	PBZ	The Big 3
"Nun Else To Do" (Remix)	2012	Rich Kidz	Straight Like That 3
"The One Eyed Kitten Song"	2012	Wale	Folarin
"Beautiful Day"	2013	Young Scooter	Street Lottery
"A-Town" (Remix)	2013	CyHi The Prynce, B.o.B., 2 Chainz	Ivy League: Kick Back
"Party City"	2013	Kevin McCall	Definition
"Buss It"	2013	Cap1	T.R.U. 2 It
"That Pack"	2013	Gucci Mane	Trap Back 2
"Dance For Me"	2013	D Dash	Mill B4 Dinner Time
"On The Plug"	2013	DJ Scream	The Ratchet Superior
"Practice Lookin' Fly"	2013	Mistah F.A.B.	Hella Ratchet
"Burn One"	2016	Berner	Hempire
"Nasty"	2017	Two-9	FRVR
