= Jungle Rules =

Studio album by French Montana
- Released: July 14, 2017
- Recorded: 2015–2017
- Genres: Hip hop; trap
- Length: 64:19
- Labels: Coke Boys; Bad Boy; Epic
- Producers: Rick Steel; Fenrick Gibss; Alex Lustig; Alkaline; A1; Beat Billionaire; Ben Billions; C.P Dubb; Cubeatz; DaHeala; DannyBoyStyles; Detail; DtownThaGreat; Frank Dukes; Harry Fraud; ISM; J-Holt; Jaegen; London on da Track; Mike Will Made It; Masar; Murda Beatz; NGHTxNGHT; Nic Nac; Nova; Scott Storch; Shaun Lopez; Ziggyonthekeyboard; 1Mind; 2Epik

French Montana chronology
MC4 (2016)	Jungle Rules (2017)	Coke Wave 4 (2019)

Singles from Jungle Rules
- 1. "Unforgettable / No Pressure" Released: April 7, 2017; 2. "A Lie" Released: August 15, 2017; 3. "Famous" Released: November 28, 2017

Jungle Rules is the second studio album by Moroccan-American rapper French Montana. It was released on July 14, 2017, by Coke Boys, Bad Boy and Epic Records. The album succeeds his mixtape MC4 (2016), which was originally intended to be his second studio album. It features guest appearances from Future, Travis Scott, The Weeknd, Young Thug, Pharrell Williams, Quavo, T.I., Swae Lee, Marc E. Bassy, Chinx and Max B, among others. Production derives from frequent collaborator Harry Fraud, as well as Scott Storch, Detail, London on da Track, Mike Will Made It and others. The album was supported by the singles "No Pressure" featuring Future and "Unforgettable" featuring Swae Lee.

Jungle Rules received generally favorable reviews from critics. It debuted at number three on the US Billboard 200, selling 52,000 copies in its first week. In June 2020, the album was certified platinum by the Recording Industry Association of America (RIAA).

== Background ==
The title Jungle Rules was originally announced on August 25, 2015, in the midst of Chris Brown's "One Hell of a Nite Tour" which ran between August and September which the rapper co-headlined. The title was shelved, however, when in October the mixtape was released under the name Coke Zoo. On June 12, 2017, Billboard attended a documentary screening and listening party hosted by French Montana in New York City. The event featured previews of tracks expected on the upcoming sophomore album. In a subsequent radio interview with Angie Martinez, he confirmed having completed recording three upcoming projects, including one being a collaboration, and the other his next album. The title Jungle Rules was revived following his performance at the 2017 BET Awards, where the name and release date was revealed for July 14. The track listing was revealed on July 5, 2017.

== Singles ==
The joint lead singles "No Pressure" and "Unforgettable" were released on April 7, 2017, for streaming and digital download. The latter peaked at number three on the US Billboard Hot 100, becoming the highest-charting single as well as the first top 10 single of his career as lead artist to date.

"A Lie" featuring The Weeknd was sent to rhythmic radio as the album's third official single on August 22, 2017. It peaked at number 75 on the Billboard Hot 100.

"Famous" was sent to rhythmic radio as the album's fourth official single on November 28, 2017. The two remix versions of the song featuring HoodCelebrityy and Adam Levine, were both released on February 9 and August 24, 2018, respectively.

=== Promotional singles ===
On July 11, 2017, "Jump" featuring American rapper Travis Scott, was released as a promotional single.

== Critical reception ==
Professional ratings
Aggregate scores
Source	Rating
Metacritic	68/100
Review scores
Source	Rating
AllMusic	3/5 stars
Exclaim!	9/10
Pitchfork	6.5/10

Jungle Rules received generally favorable reviews from critics upon release. At Metacritic, which assigns a normalized rating out of 100 to reviews from mainstream publications, the album received an average score of 68, based on 8 reviews. Sheldon Pearce of Pitchfork commented that "Jungle Rules doesn't answer any of the questions that have circled French Montana his entire career, chiefly: Can he be a leading man and can he be as interesting on wax as he is in the day to day? He has evolved quite a bit since Excuse My French, coming up with moments of sharpness, but he is still limited in what he can do. His music flattens the showy life he lives. If there's a case to be made for his vibrance, it isn't this." Riley Wallace of Exclaim! gave a positive review, stating French Montana "delivers a cohesive cover-to-cover platter of flame emojis that traverse his range". Neil Yeung of AllMusic wrote: "In the end, with enough highlights that could constitute a tighter and more effective track list, Jungle Rules suffers from lengthy playlist aspirations and not enough focus."

== Commercial performance ==
Jungle Rules debuted at number three on the US Billboard 200 with 52,000 album-equivalent units, of which 16,000 were pure album sales in its first week. On June 11, 2020, the album was certified platinum by the Recording Industry Association of America (RIAA) for combined sales and album-equivalent units of over a million units in the United States.

== Track listing ==
Jungle Rules track listing
No.	Title	Writer(s)	Producer(s)	Length
1.	"Whiskey Eyes" (featuring Chinx)	Karim Kharbouch; Lionel Pickens; Fenrick Gibbs; Fe Knight; Shaun Lopez; Nick Long; Benjamin Diehl; Khaled Khaled	Ben Billions; Rick Steel; Shaun Lopez^{[b]}	4:44
2.	"Unforgettable" (featuring Swae Lee)	Kharbouch; Khalif Brown; Christopher Washington; Jagvir Aujla; McCulloch Sutphin	C.P. Dubb; Jaegan; 1Mind^{[c]}	3:53
3.	"Trippin"	Kharbouch; Marc Griffin; Diehl; Khaled	Ben Billions	2:56
4.	"A Lie" (featuring The Weeknd and Max B)	Kharbouch; Tesfaye; Charly Wingate; Rory Quigley; Jason Quenneville; Danny Schofield; Matt Carillo; Fred Lowinger; Russ Mitkowski; Matthew Quinones	Harry Fraud; DaHeala^{[b]}; DannyBoyStyles^{[b]}; Masar^{[b]}	3:46
5.	"Jump" (featuring Travis Scott)	Kharbouch; Jacques Webster II; Jeryn Peters; Imogen Heap	Nova	3:41
6.	"Hotel Bathroom"	Kharbouch; Floyd Bentley; Ishmael Montague; Adam Feeney	A1; ISM; Frank Dukes	3:51
7.	"Bring Dem Things" (featuring Pharrell)	Kharbouch; Pharrell Williams; Austin Donawa; R. Quigley; Paul Butterfield; Jim Waynie; David Sanborn; Charles Mingus; Paul Simon	Harry Fraud; Pharrell^{[a]}	3:16
8.	"Bag" (featuring Ziico Niico)	Kharbouch; Sherwin Charles; Nico Burrell	Ziggy on the Keyboard	3:37
9.	"Migo Montana" (featuring Quavo)	Kharbouch; Quavious Marshall; London Holmes	London on da Track	3:38
10.	"No Pressure" (featuring Future)	Kharbouch; Nayvadius Wilburn; Bentley; Noel Fisher; Jordan Holt	J-Holt; A1^{[a]}; Detail^{[a]}	3:27
11.	"Push Up"	Kharbouch; Shane Lindstrom; Kevin Gomringer; Tim Gomringer	Murda Beatz; Cubeatz^{[a]}	3:02
12.	"Stop It" (featuring T.I.)	Kharbouch; Clifford Harris, Jr.; Scott Storch; Diego Ave	Scott Storch	3:05
13.	"Black Out" (featuring Young Thug)	Kharbouch; Jeffery Williams; Shamann Cooke	Beat Billionaire	3:38
14.	"She Workin" (featuring Marc E. Bassy)	Kharbouch; Griffin; William Mosgrove; James Hau; Gibbs; David Park; Nicholas Balding	Nic Nac; Count Bassy; NGHTxNGHT; DaviDior^{[b]}; Rick Steel^{[b]}	3:07
15.	"Formula" (featuring Alkaline)	Kharbouch; Earlan Bartley; Leonandre Miller	Alkaline; Lee Milla	3:54
16.	"Famous"	Kharbouch; Richard Butler; Jeremy Jordan-Jones; Dwayne Nesmith; Floyd Hills	Rico Love; DtownThaGreat; DanjaHandz^{[b]}	4:04
17.	"Too Much"	Kharbouch; Alexander Lustig; Lonnie Kimble	Alex Lustig	2:56
18.	"White Dress"	Kharbouch; Jeremy Felton; Theodore Tchamala; Francisco Soto; Ahmad Balshe	2Epik	3:43
Total length:				64:19

Track notes

- ^{^[a]} signifies a co-producer
- ^{^[b]} signifies an additional producer
- ^{^[c]} signifies an uncredited producer
- "Unforgettable" originally featured a guest verse from Jeremih

Sample credits

- "Jump" contains a sample of "Headlock", written and performed by Imogen Heap.
- "Bring Dem Things" contains a sample of "Last Hope's Gone", written by Paul Butterfield, Jim Haynie and David Sanborn, and performed by the Paul Butterfield Blues Band; samples of "Mingus Fingus No. 2", written and performed by Charles Mingus; and a sample of "Take Me to the Mardi Gras", written by Paul Simon, and performed by Bob James.
- "Bag" is a remix of "That Bag", written and performed by Ziico Niico.
- "Formula" is a remix of "Formula", written and performed by Alkaline.
- "White Dress" contains a sample of "Aeorien", written by Francisco Vidal, and performed by Fran Soto featuring Aeralie Bringhton.

== Credits and personnel ==
=== Performance ===
- French Montana – primary artist
- Chinx – featured artist (track 1)
- Swae Lee – featured artist (track 2)
- The Weeknd – featured artist (track 3)
- Max B – featured artist (track 3)
- Travis Scott – featured artist (track 5)
- Pharrell Williams – featured artist (track 7)
- Ziico Niico – featured artist (track 8)
- Quavo – featured artist (track 9)
- Future – featured artist (track 10)
- T.I. – featured artist (track 12)
- Young Thug – featured artist (track 13)
- Marc E. Bassy – featured artist (track 14)
- Alkaline – featured artist (track 15)
- Fe – background vocals (tracks 1 and 18)
- Fernick Gibbs – background vocals (track 3)
- Rick Steel – background vocals (track 3)
- The Kid Daytona – background vocals (track 7)
- Dafina Zeqiri – background vocals (track 16)
- Terik Morris – speaker (track 15)
- Rico Love – background vocals (track 17)

=== Production ===
- Puff Daddy – executive production
- French Montana – executive production
- Rick Steel – executive production, production (track 1), additional production (track 14)
- Ben Billions – production (tracks 1 and 3)
- C.P Dubb – production (track 2)
- Jaegan – production (track 2)
- 1Mind – production (track 2)
- Harry Fraud – production (tracks 4 and 7)
- Nova – production (track 5)
- Floyd Bentley – production (track 6), co-production (track 10)
- Frank Dukes – production (track 6)
- Ism – production (track 6)
- Ziggy on the Keyboard – production (track 8)
- London on da Track – production (track 9)
- J Holt – production (track 10)
- Murda Beatz – production (track 11)
- Scott Storch – production (track 12)
- Beat Billionaire – production (track 13)
- Nic Nac – production (track 14)
- NightxNight – production (track 14)
- Alkaline – production (track 15)
- Lee Milla – production (track 15)
- DtownThaGreat – production (track 16)
- Rico Love – production (track 16)
- Alex Lustig – production (track 17)
- 2Epik – production (track 18)
- Shaun Lopez – additional production (track 1)
- DaHeala – additional production (track 4)
- DannyBoyStyles – additional production (track 4)
- Masar – additional production (track 4)
- DanjaHandz – additional production (track 16)
- DaviDior – additional production (track 14)
- Pharrell Williams – co-production (track 7)
- Detail – co-production (track 10)
- CuBeatz – co-production (track 11)

=== Technical ===
- Emerson Mancini – mastering (tracks 1, 3–9, 11–18)
- Dave Kutch – mastering (track 2 and 10)
- Jaycen Joshua – mixing (tracks 1–11, 13–18)
- Fabian Marasciullo – mixing (track 12)
- Ell – recording (tracks 1–4, 7, 9–12, 14, 15, 17, and 18)
- Rick Steel – recording (tracks 1–8, 10, 14, and 18)
- Floyd Bentley – recording (track 4)
- Harry Fraud – recording (tracks 4 and 5)
- Masar – recording (track 4)
- Shi Kamiyama – recording (track 4)
- Jaydawn – recording (track 7)
- Evan LaRay Brunson – recording (track 8)
- Bijan – recording (track 11)
- Shawn Jarrett – recording (track 13)
- John Shullman –recording (track 16)
- David Nakaji – engineering assistance (tracks 1–11, 13–18)
- Maddox Chim – engineering assistance (tracks 1–11, 13–18)
- Raul Barcena – engineering assistance (track 1)
- Sean Klein – engineering assistance (track 1)
- McCoy Socalgargoyle – engineering assistance (track 12)

=== Design ===
- Ben Swantek – art design and photography
- Koury Angelo – photography

== Charts ==
=== Weekly charts ===
Chart (2017)	Peak position
Australian Albums (ARIA)	67
Belgian Albums (Ultratop Flanders)	64
Canadian Albums (Billboard)	2
Danish Albums (Hitlisten)	5
Dutch Albums (Album Top 100)	14
Finnish Albums (Suomen virallinen lista)	17
French Albums (SNEP)	62
German Albums (Offizielle Top 100)	78
Italian Albums (FIMI)	92
New Zealand Heatseekers Albums (RMNZ)	1
Norwegian Albums (VG-lista)	12
Swedish Albums (Sverigetopplistan)	14
Swiss Albums (Schweizer Hitparade)	43
UK Albums (Official Charts)	33
US Billboard 200	3
US Top R&B/Hip-Hop Albums (Billboard)	3

=== Year-end charts ===
Chart (2017)	Position
Danish Albums (Hitlisten)	70
US Billboard 200	130
US Top R&B/Hip-Hop Albums (Billboard)	44

== Certifications ==
Region	Certification	Certified units/sales
Canada (Music Canada)	Platinum	80,000^{‡}
Denmark (IFPI Danmark)	Gold	10,000^{^}
Poland (ZPAV)	Gold	10,000^{‡}
Switzerland (IFPI Switzerland)	Gold	10,000^{‡}
United States (RIAA)	Platinum	1,000,000^{‡}
^{^} Shipments figures based on certification alone.^{‡} Sales+streaming figures based on certification alone.
