= Mother Russia (disambiguation) =

Mother Russia is a national personification of Russia.

Mother Russia may also refer to:

- "Mother Russia" (Fe song)
- "Mother Russia" (Renaissance song)
- Mother Russia (audio drama), an audio drama based on the British television series Doctor Who
- Mother Russia (play), a 2026 play
- "Dominion/Mother Russia", a song by The Sisters of Mercy
- "Mother Russia", a song from the Iron Maiden album No Prayer for the Dying
- "Mother Russia", a villain from the comic book series Kick-Ass 2

== See also ==
- Oh! Mother Russia, a 2005 album by Dover
