= A Lie =

Single by French Montana featuring the Weeknd and Max B

from the album Jungle Rules
- Released: August 15, 2017
- Genre: Hip hop; pop
- Length: 3:46
- Label: Epic; Bad Boy; Coke Boys
- Songwriters: Karim Kharbouch; Abel Tesfaye; Charly Wingate; Rory Quigley; Jason Quenneville; Danny Schofield; Matt Carillo; Fred Lowinger; Russ Mitkowski; Matthew Quinones
- Producers: Harry Fraud; DaHeala; DannyBoyStyles; Masar

French Montana singles chronology
"Unforgettable" (2017)	"A Lie" (2017)	"Hurtin' Me" (2017)

The Weeknd singles chronology
"Rockin'" / "Reminder" (2017)	"A Lie" (2017)	"Die for You" (2017)

Max B singles chronology
"Chinx & Max / Paid For" (2016)	"A Lie" (2017)	"Breathe" (2017)

Music video
- "A Lie" on YouTube

"A Lie" is a song by Moroccan-American rapper French Montana featuring Canadian singer the Weeknd and fellow American rapper Max B. The song was written by the artists alongside Matt Carillo, Fred Lowinger, Russ Mitkowski, Matthew Quinones, and producers Harry Fraud, DaHeala, DannyBoyStyles, with additional production credits going to Masar. The song was serviced to rhythmic radio on August 15, 2017, as the album's third single. The single peaked at number 75 on the US Billboard Hot 100.

== Music video ==
The music video for "A Lie" premiered on July 14, 2017, on French Montana's Vevo account on YouTube. The video was shot in New York City, New York and was directed by French Montana and Spiff TV with cameos done by Belly, A$AP Rocky, Juelz Santana, and NAV. The music video has surpassed over 30 million views on YouTube.

== Charts ==
Chart (2017)	Peak position
Australia (ARIA)	71
Australia Urban (ARIA)	31
Canada Hot 100 (Billboard)	30
New Zealand Heatseekers (RMNZ)	4
Switzerland (Schweizer Hitparade)	80
UK Singles (Official Charts)	51
UK Hip Hop/R&B (Official Charts)	12
US Billboard Hot 100	75
US Hot R&B/Hip-Hop Songs (Billboard)	31
US R&B/Hip-Hop Airplay (Billboard)	50
US Rhythmic Airplay (Billboard)	34

== Certifications ==
Region	Certification	Certified units/sales
Canada (Music Canada)	Platinum	80,000^{‡}
^{‡} Sales+streaming figures based on certification alone.

== Release history ==
Region	Date	Format	Label(s)	Ref.
United States	August 15, 2017	Rhythmic contemporary	Epic; Bad Boy; Coke Boys	
