= HXV =

American music producer (born 1983)

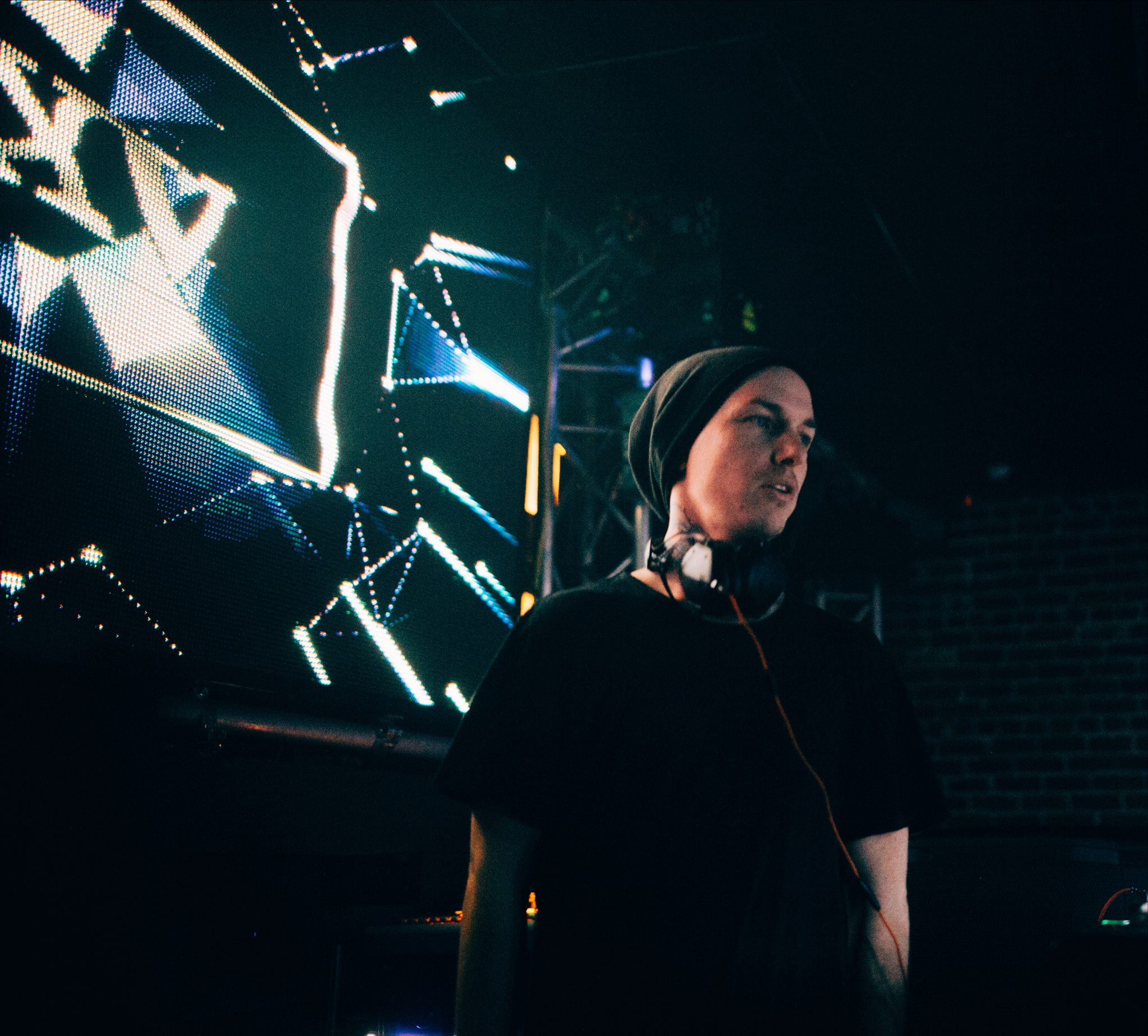

Background information
- Also known as: Heroes x Villains
- Born: Daniel Pollard; August 23, 1983 (age 42)
- Origin: Atlanta, Georgia, United States
- Genres: Trap; hip hop; electronic music
- Occupations: DJ; record producer; remixer
- Instruments: Synthesizer; drum machine; music sequencer; personal computer
- Years active: 2009–present
- Labels: Fool's Gold; Ultra

Daniel Pollard (born August 23, 1983), known professionally as HXV (Heroes x Villains), is an American electronic music producer, DJ, and songwriter from Atlanta, Georgia. Pollard first gained recognition in the early 2010s for his mixtapes and remixes that blended Southern trap, electronic bass music, and industrial sound design, contributing to the emergence of Atlanta’s hybrid trap–electronic scene. His early work, including releases on Mad Decent and collaborations with Atlanta hip-hop artists, positioned HXV as one of the pioneers bridging regional rap production with the rising wave of festival-driven electronic music.

Across the 2010s, Pollard expanded HXV into a broader experimental project, producing original singles, score work, and official remixes for artists across electronic, rap, and industrial music. His collaborations and reinterpretations for acts such as The Glitch Mob, Imanu, Svdden Death, HVDES, and Chelsea Wolfe reflect an ongoing evolution toward darker, more minimal, and sound-design-focused production.

In 2025, Pollard launched Lilith, an independent label dedicated to refined bass music and forward-leaning electronic sound design. The single “Waiting” inaugurated the label and marked a new phase in the HXV project, highlighting Pollard’s shift toward atmospheric, minimalist, and artistically curated electronic work. Through both his production catalog and his contributions to Atlanta’s electronic–trap crossover, Pollard is regarded as an influential figure in shaping the intersection of Southern rap aesthetics and contemporary bass music.

== Career ==
Pollard started DJing at the age of 15, and started HXV in 2009. In 2012 HXV released his first mixtape, We Off That, on Mad Decent, which was hosted by both Lil' Jon and Cobra Corps. This release piqued the interest of both hip hop heads and dubstep bangers. HXV went on to remix songs by numerous artists, including The Weeknd, Young Jeezy and Charli XCX.

In February 2012 HXV, alongside Diplo and Mayhem, produced a mixtape for ATL rap group FKI titled Transformers in the Hood.

In January 2014, both Daniel Disaster and Pete H of HXV released their Chapel EP. This was a collaboration with the fashion brand FRESH.i.AM and Red Bull.

On April 14, 2015 they introduced fans to Vultures, a five-track EP featuring artists including Lil Uzi Vert, Rome Fortune, Ricky Remedy and Debroka. Vultures would mark the end of Pete H's involvement with HXV, as Daniel moved forward as a solo artist from then on.

October 2016 brought light to HXV's emotional single "Novocaine" featuring Daniel Disaster's long time and close friend Naz Tokio. "Novocaine" centers around Daniel's sobriety and the challenges that come with it, Naz being representative of the disease that is addiction.

Beginning in 2021, Pollard resumed releasing music under the HXV moniker following a period focused on production work, collaborations, and experimental electronic projects. That year, he released the single “Dance No More,” which blended darker more minimal electronic elements found in his love and interest in Techno and marked a shift from his earlier trap-driven output.

In 2025, HXV released “Waiting,” his first official single in several years. The track introduced a new stylistic direction centered around atmospheric production, minimal arrangements, and a more experimental electronic palette.

These releases reflected an evolution in Pollard’s production approach, incorporating elements of industrial bass, ambient sound design, and textured electronic composition.

=== 2025–present: Lilith and renewed artistic direction ===
In 2025, Pollard founded Lilith, an independent record label established to explore a more refined, minimalist, and sound-design-driven approach to electronic music. The label was created as a platform for experimental bass music and projects that blend atmospheric, dark, and avant-electronic influences. Lilith emphasizes carefully detailed production, restrained emotional tone, and a curated aesthetic that diverges from Pollard’s earlier trap-based work.

The single “Waiting” served as the inaugural release on Lilith and marked the beginning of a new creative phase for HXV. The track introduced the sonic and conceptual blueprint for the label, highlighting sparse vocals, heavy textural focus, and atmospheric low-end. Through Lilith, Pollard intends to release new HXV material and develop emerging artists whose work aligns with the label’s forward-leaning electronic direction.

== Discography ==
=== EPs ===
- Run the Trap (2012)
- Chapel (2013, Red Bull)
- VULTURES (2015, Ultra Music)

=== Singles ===
- "Today" with Stooki Sound and Rome Fortune (2013)
- "Illusions" with Naz Tokio (2014)
- "Twerk" (2014)
- "We Comin" with Mac TurnUp (2014)
- "Living Life" with OG Maco & Ricky Remedy (2015)
- "What You Off" with Lil Uzi Vert (2015)
- "Made It" with Lil Uzi Vert & Rome Fortune (2015)
- "PLAGUES" with Ricky Remedy & Debroka (2015)
- "Vultures" with Ricky Remedy & Debroka (2015)
- "Novocaine" with Naz Tokio (2016)
- "Dance No More" (2021)
- "Waiting" (2025)

=== Remixes ===
- Major Lazer featuring Flux Pavilion - "Jah No Partial"
- Gucci Mane - "Lemonade"
- Dimitri Vegas & Like Mike featuring Moguai - "Mammoth"
- Rihanna - "Needed Me"
- Diplo featuring Lil' Jon - "U Don't Like Me"
- Carnage & Borgore - "Incredible"
- Flosstradamus featuring Casino - "Mosh Pit"
- Vanic featuring K.Flay - "Can't Sleep"
- Ace Hood & Future - "Bugatti"
- The Weeknd - "The Hills"
- Knife Party - "LRAD"
- Mayhem & Antiserum - "MPR"
- Trinidad James, 2 Chainz, Future, Waka Flocka, Yo Gotti, & Gucci Mane - "Hoodrich Anthem"
- HYDRABADD featuring Abra - "Sanctuary"
- Doe B. featuring T.I. & Juicy J - "Let Me Find Out"
- Mt. Eden - "Airwalker"
- Povi - "4AM"
- Imanu, Glitch Mob - "Dream Sequence"
- Svdden Death, HVDES - "Don't You Dare Go Hollow"
- Chelsea Wolfe - "Liminal"

=== Mixes ===
- "We Off That"
- "HXV Presents Basel Castle 2014 Mix"
- "HXV Diplo and Friends Uncut"
- "HXV Presents Into the Void 001 VAVLT Exclusive TomorrowWorld Mix"
- "HXV Presents - Into The Void 002 - PARTY OF 1"
- "Metronome: HXV"
- "Black Friday Mix Vol 1"
