= Let It Go (Fe song) =

Song by Fe
- Released: February 20, 2013
- Recorded: 2012–13
- Genre: Indie pop
- Length: 4:52
- Songwriter(s): Maria Knight

"Let It Go" is an indie pop song by British singer-songwriter Fe. It was uploaded to YouTube on February 20, 2013. The song received high acclaim from critics and indie music fans. Both the singer and the song were compared with American singers Mazzy Star and Lana Del Rey.

== Background and composition ==
"Let It Go" was written by Fe. She describes her music as "intimate" and "a cloud dipped in vanilla".

== Critical reception ==
"Let It Go" received positive reviews from music critics. Indie music blog Pigeons and Planes, said that "in an age when aesthetics and a total package add a lot to stir up interest in an up-and-coming artist, Fe is in a great position." Chris Budd of Aux.tv described Fe's voice as "elegant". Music blog Pretty Much Amazing compared the song with Lana Del Rey, Amy Winehouse and Angel Olsen. Jamie Milton of This Is Fake DIY said that "the production surrounding her debut track 'Let It Go' is restrained and pacing, slick to the finest degree." On April 19, 2013, Pigeons and Planes named "Let It Go" one of the best songs of that week.

== Music video ==
Fe released the music video on YouTube on February 20, 2013. The video was directed and edited by herself. It shows Fe in front of the camera with a big hat and her hair tousled. The fans described the music video as "haunting" and "beautiful". As of December 2014, "Let It Go" had 88,000 views on YouTube and 205,000 plays on SoundCloud.
