= Unforgettable (French Montana song) =

2017 single by French Montana

Single by French Montana featuring Swae Lee

from the album Jungle Rules
- Released: April 7, 2017
- Recorded: 2016
- Genre: Dancehall; hip-hop
- Length: 3:53
- Label: Epic; Bad Boy; Coke Boys
- Songwriters: Karim Kharbouch; Khalif Brown; Christopher Washington; J. Aujla; McCulloch Sutphin; Michael Williams
- Producers: Jaegen; 1Mind; C.P Dubb; Mike Will Made It

French Montana singles chronology
"No Pressure" (2017)	"Unforgettable" (2017)	"A Lie" (2017)

Swae Lee singles chronology
"Ball Out the Lot" (2016)	"Unforgettable" (2017)	"Guatemala" (2018)

Music video
- "Unforgettable" on YouTube

"Unforgettable" is a song by Moroccan-American rapper French Montana featuring fellow American rapper and singer Swae Lee of Rae Sremmurd. It was released by Epic and Bad Boy Records on April 7, 2017, as the joint-lead single from the former's second studio album Jungle Rules (2017), along with "No Pressure" (featuring Future). Produced by Jaegen, 1Mind, C.P Dubb, and Mike Will Made It, the song peaked at number three on the US Billboard Hot 100, making it French Montana's highest-charting song and first as a lead artist to peak within the chart's top ten, and Swae Lee's first song to do so as a solo artist. Its accompanying music video has received over 1.8 billion views on YouTube as of February, 2026. In 2024, "Unforgettable" became the most-streamed song to come out of New York.

"Unforgettable" has reached the top 10 in 15 countries including Australia, Canada, Denmark, France, Germany, Ireland, Netherlands, New Zealand, Sweden, Switzerland, and the United Kingdom, and the top 20 in Austria, Czech Republic, Hungary, Lebanon, Norway, Scotland, and Spain.

With this song, French Montana became the first African-born artist to have a diamond certified song.

== Background ==
According to Mac Sutphin, one-third of 1Mind, the song was initially produced for Drake during recording for Drake's fourth album Views (2016). Sutphin also alleged he did not know of French Montana and Swae Lee's involvement on the song until French Montana premiered the song on November 9, 2016, coinciding with French Montana's 32nd birthday. This version featured a guest appearance from Jeremih.

The song was later re-mixed and mastered, with Jeremih's contributions removed, for its release as a single on April 7, 2017, alongside "No Pressure" featuring Future. After the release of "Unforgettable," streaming platforms updated the song to include production credits from Jaegen, C.P Dubb, and Mike Will Made It. The song has been certified diamond by the Recording Industry Association of America (RIAA) as well as platinum or multi-platinum in over 16 countries.

== Composition ==
"Unforgettable" is a dancehall and hip hop song. According to the sheet music published at musicnotes.com, the song is written in the key of G♯ minor with a tempo of 98 beats per minute.

== Music video ==
The song's accompanying music video premiered on April 13, 2017, on French Montana's Vevo account on YouTube. The video was shot in Kampala, Uganda. It was directed by French Montana and Spiff TV and includes Ugandan young dance group Triplets Ghetto Kids. As of August 2026, the video has over 1.9 billion views on YouTube.

== Remixes and cover versions ==
"Unforgettable (Remix)"

Remix by French Montana featuring Swae Lee and Mariah Carey
- Released: August 25, 2017
- Length: 4:04
- Label: Epic; Bad Boy; Coke Boys
- Songwriters: Karim Kharbouch; Khalif Brown; Christopher Washington; Jake Aujla; McCulloch Sutphin
- Producers: Jaegen; 1Mind; C.P Dubb; Mike Will Made It

Mariah Carey singles chronology
"Infamous" (2017)	"Unforgettable (Remix)" (2017)	"The Star" (2017)

A version featuring Swae Lee with an additional verse by his brother Slim Jxmmi, the other member of Rae Sremmurd, was released on May 26, 2017.

On June 26, 2017, a Spanish version performed by Colombian singer J Balvin was released.

Another freestyle turned cover features late American rapper, PnB Rock.

There is also a remix (as well as an acoustic version) featuring American singer Mariah Carey.

== Use in media ==
The song is featured in an episode of Grown-ish.

The song was performed by 16-year-old Zhavia on the first episode of the Fox series The Four: Battle for Stardom, winning against Elanese, and dethroning her from one of the four seats.

== Track listing ==
- Digital download
1. "Unforgettable" (featuring Swae Lee) – 3:53
2. "Unforgettable" (featuring Swae Lee) [Clean] – 3:53
- J Hus & Jae5 Remix
1. "Unforgettable" (J Hus & Jae5 Remix) (featuring Swae Lee) – 3:46
- Major Lazer Remix
1. "Unforgettable" (Major Lazer Remix) (featuring Swae Lee) – 3:16
- Latin Remix
1. "Unforgettable" (with J Balvin) (featuring Swae Lee) – 3:34
2. "Unforgettable" (with J Balvin) (featuring Swae Lee) [Clean] – 3:34
- Tiësto & Dzeko's AFTR:HRS Remix
1. "Unforgettable" (Tiësto & Dzeko's AFTR:HRS Remix) (featuring Swae Lee) – 3:40
- Mariah Carey Remix
1. "Unforgettable" (with Mariah Carey) (featuring Swae Lee) – 3:53
2. "Unforgettable" (with Mariah Carey) (featuring Swae Lee) [Clean] – 3:53
3. "Unforgettable" (with Mariah Carey) (Acoustic) (featuring Swae Lee) – 4:04
4. "Unforgettable" (with Mariah Carey) (Acoustic) (featuring Swae Lee) [Clean] – 4:04
- Slushii Remix
1. "Unforgettable" (Slushii Remix) (featuring Swae Lee) – 3:07
2. "Unforgettable" (Slushii Remix) (featuring Swae Lee) [Clean] – 3:07

== Charts ==
=== Weekly charts ===
Chart (2017–2018)	Peak position
Australia (ARIA)	7
Australia Urban (ARIA)	1
Austria (Ö3 Austria Top 40)	11
Belgium (Ultratop 50 Flanders)	20
Belgium (Ultratop 50 Wallonia)	4
Canada Hot 100 (Billboard)	3
Colombia (National-Report)	53
Costa Rica (Monitor Latino)	12
Czech Republic Airplay (ČNS IFPI)	64
Czech Republic Singles Digital (ČNS IFPI)	18
Denmark (Tracklisten)	6
France (SNEP)	3
Germany (GfK)	6
Hungary (Single Top 40)	14
Hungary (Stream Top 40)	16
Ireland (IRMA)	2
Israel International Airplay (Media Forest)	6
Italy (FIMI)	67
Latvia Streaming (DigiTop100)	27
Lebanon (Lebanese Top 20)	16
Netherlands (Dutch Top 40)	13
Netherlands (Single Top 100)	9
New Zealand (Recorded Music NZ)	6
Norway (VG-lista)	11
Panama Airplay (Monitor Latino)	14
Paraguay Airplay (Monitor Latino)	9
Philippines (Philippine Hot 100)	62
Portugal (AFP)	2
Romania TV Airplay (Media Forest)	7
Scottish Singles Sales (Official Charts)	12
Slovakia Airplay (ČNS IFPI)	51
Slovakia Singles Digital (ČNS IFPI)	14
Slovenia Airplay (SloTop50)	50
Spain (Promusicae)	46
Sweden (Sverigetopplistan)	5
Switzerland (Schweizer Hitparade)	9
UK Singles (Official Charts)	2
US Billboard Hot 100	3
US Dance Club Songs (Billboard)	42
US Dance Airplay (Billboard)	4
US Hot R&B/Hip-Hop Songs (Billboard)	1
US Pop Airplay (Billboard)	9
US Rhythmic Airplay (Billboard)	1

Chart (2024)	Peak position
Global 200 (Billboard)	133

=== Year-end charts ===
Chart (2017)	Position
Australia (ARIA)	21
Austria (Ö3 Austria Top 40)	16
Belgium (Ultratop Flanders)	64
Belgium (Ultratop Wallonia)	42
Brazil (Pro-Música Brasil)	168
Canada (Canadian Hot 100)	5
Denmark (Tracklisten)	9
France (SNEP)	10
Germany (Official German Charts)	9
Hungary (Stream Top 40)	33
Israel (Media Forest)	36
Netherlands (Dutch Top 40)	39
Netherlands (Single Top 100)	11
New Zealand (Recorded Music NZ)	12
Portugal (AFP)	3
Romania (Airplay 100)	45
Sweden (Sverigetopplistan)	11
Switzerland (Schweizer Hitparade)	18
UK Singles (OCC)	4
US Billboard Hot 100	15
US Dance/Mix Show Airplay (Billboard)	21
US Hot R&B/Hip-Hop Songs (Billboard)	5
US Mainstream Top 40 (Billboard)	37
US Rhythmic (Billboard)	1

Chart (2018)	Position
Canada (Canadian Hot 100)	55
France (SNEP)	139
Portugal (AFP)	64
UK Singles (OCC)	73

Chart (2024)	Position
Global 200 (Billboard)	152

=== Decade-end charts ===
Chart (2010–2019)	Position
Germany (Official German Charts)	48
UK Singles (OCC)	26
US Hot R&B/Hip-Hop Songs (Billboard)	49

== Certifications ==
Region	Certification	Certified units/sales
Australia (ARIA)	13× Platinum	910,000^{‡}
Austria (IFPI Austria)	Platinum	30,000^{‡}
Belgium (BRMA)	Platinum	20,000^{‡}
Canada (Music Canada)	Diamond	800,000^{‡}
Denmark (IFPI Danmark)	3× Platinum	270,000^{‡}
France (SNEP)	Diamond	233,333^{‡}
Germany (BVMI)	3× Platinum	1,200,000^{‡}
Hungary (MAHASZ)	9× Platinum	27,000^{‡}
Italy (FIMI)	2× Platinum	200,000^{‡}
Mexico (AMPROFON)	3× Platinum	180,000^{‡}
Netherlands (NVPI)	Platinum	40,000^{‡}
New Zealand (RMNZ)	8× Platinum	240,000^{‡}
Poland (ZPAV)	3× Platinum	150,000^{‡}
Portugal (AFP)	6× Platinum	60,000^{‡}
Spain (Promusicae)	2× Platinum	120,000^{‡}
Sweden (GLF)	5× Platinum	200,000^{‡}
Switzerland (IFPI Switzerland)	4× Platinum	80,000^{‡}
United Kingdom (BPI)	7× Platinum	4,200,000^{‡}
United States (RIAA)	11× Platinum	11,000,000^{‡}
Streaming
Greece (IFPI Greece)	3× Platinum	6,000,000^{†}
^{‡} Sales+streaming figures based on certification alone.^{†} Streaming-only figures based on certification alone.

== Release history ==
Region	Date	Format	Version	Label(s)	Ref.
Various	April 7, 2017	Digital download	Original	Epic; Bad Boy; Coke Boys	
United States	April 18, 2017	Rhythmic contemporary	Original	Epic; Bad Boy; Coke Boys	
Various	June 9, 2017	Digital download	J Hus & Jae5 Remix	Epic; Bad Boy; Coke Boys	
Various	June 9, 2017	Digital download	Major Lazer Remix	Epic; Bad Boy; Coke Boys	
Various	August 2, 2017	Digital download	Latin Remix	Epic; Bad Boy; Coke Boys	
Italy	August 18, 2017	Contemporary hit radio	Original	Sony	
Various	August 25, 2017	Digital download	Mariah Carey Remix	Epic; Bad Boy; Coke Boys	
Various	August 25, 2017	Digital download	Mariah Carey Acoustic Remix	Epic; Bad Boy; Coke Boys	
Various	August 25, 2017	Digital download	Tiësto vs. Dzeko AFTR:HRS remix	Epic; Bad Boy; Coke Boys	
Various	September 8, 2017	Digital download	Slushii Remix	Epic; Bad Boy; Coke Boys	

== See also ==
- List of highest-certified singles in Australia
