= Make It Nasty =

Single by Tyga

from the album Careless World: Rise of the Last King
- Released: 2012
- Genre: Dirty rap
- Length: 3:06
- Label: Young Money; Cash Money; Republic
- Songwriters: Michael Stevenson, Christopher Washington
- Producer: C.P DUBB

Tyga singles chronology
"I Love Girls" (2012)	"Make It Nasty" (2012)	"Gold" (2012)

"Make It Nasty" is a song by American rapper Tyga, from his second studio album, Careless World: Rise of the Last King. For the chart dated February 27, 2012, "Make It Nasty" debuted at number 91 on the US Billboard Hot 100. It was released officially when Tyga returned from his "Careless World" Tour. The song was originally on Tyga's mixtape "#BitchImTheShit". On March 19, 2020, the single was certified platinum by the Recording Industry Association of America (RIAA) for combined sales and album-equivalent units over a million units in the United States.

== Music video ==
The music video for "Make It Nasty" was uploaded to YouTube on December 4, 2011, and it contains explicit content. It was directed by Alex Nazari. On July 28, 2012, a second video containing explicit content was released for the song directed by Colin Tilley.

Tyga was sued by two women who appeared in the video for "Make It Nasty" for 10 million dollars each, due to Tyga allegedly showing their nipples without their consent. They were assured that they would be edited out, and the unedited version of the video would not be released. On September 21, 2013, Tyga was sued by another women from the video shoot for sexual battery as well as fraud, invasion of privacy, and infliction of emotional distress. She alleged that she was groped by a man in a rabbit suit and another man grabbed her breasts. She also claims, like the two other women who have filed suit against him, that she was convinced to dance topless and assured her breasts would be edited out.

== Track listing ==
Digital download
No.	Title	Length
1.	"Make It Nasty"	3:06

== Charts ==
Chart (2012)	Peak position
US Billboard Hot 100	91
US Hot R&B/Hip-Hop Songs (Billboard)	77
US Hot Rap Songs (Billboard)	23

== Certifications ==
Region	Certification	Certified units/sales
United States (RIAA)	Platinum	1,000,000^{‡}
^{‡} Sales+streaming figures based on certification alone.
