= Fe (singer) =

- Born: Maria Knight; London, United Kingdom
- Genres: Indie pop
- Occupation(s): Singer-songwriter, photographer
- Instrument(s): Vocals, piano, drums
- Years active: 2013–present

Fe Maria Knight, known by her stage name Fe is an independent, British singer-songwriter and director.

== Music career ==
=== 2013: "Let It Go", "Remarkable Affair", "Mother Russia" and "Giddy Up" ===
Fe uploaded her debut track, "Let It Go", to YouTube on 20 February 2013. The video has gained thousands of views and a wide range of music blogs including MTV shared and praised the song. Two months later, Fe uploaded a second track, "Remarkable Affair". On 4 October 2013, she released two new tracks on SoundCloud, "Mother Russia" and "Giddy Up", calling the attention of both the media and fans. Soon after on 9 October, "Let It Go" was back in Hype Machines top 10 most popular songs and the popular online magazine Hypetrak considered her to be a "force to be reckoned with." Fe stated it was a 'shock' to have had such interest as she does not have a label, manager or press team.

"Let It Go" was played on the popular French talkshow Le Grand Journal in June and it was one of the most popular tracks on Music Week. The song "Giddy Up" is part of the Mercedes-Benz's mixtape on Spotify and Mercedes-Benz placed Fe in their 'Future Famous' article online. Music blog Iamnewmusic.com named "Mother Russia" the second best song of the year. In January's edition of Harpers Bazaar, a list of their "Top 10 People to Watch" was published. 3 artists were mentioned that included Lorde Jake Bugg and Fe.

"Remarkable Affair" was uploaded to YouTube on 1 April 2013. "Remarkable Affair" is a melancholic piano ballad. When everyone thought that Fe was gone, she unexpectedly uploaded the song to YouTube, surprising fans and indie music critics. "Remarkable Affair" was written by Fe.

Although the song did not have the same impact as its predecessor, "Remarkable Affair" was acclaimed by music critics. Mu-sique.com described Fe and the song as "sensual". Brazilian blog Boneca de Platina said that "despite the scarcity of productions that just comes down to 'Remarkable Affair' and 'Let It Go', we promise to stick on her YouTube channel and do not stay out of any novelty about this lady with lovely voice and strong personality." In February 2014, Fe announced a collaboration with Vogue for a film directed by Mario Testino where he used "Remarkable Affair" as the soundtrack. The provocative film features Anja Rubik and became one of the most shared videos on Vogue in recent history.

=== 2015–present: "Daffodils of Paris" ===
On 12 August 2015, she released "Daffodils of Paris". It was premiered by Zane Lowe on Beats 1 radio, and was later released via Apple Music, with it being one of the featured videos on Apple Connect. Its video was filmed and directed by Fe. The song received critical acclaim for its "irresistible concoction of dark and hypnotic pop" and "sweeping flow of slowly pulsed electronics and live instruments". Complex stated she was back in a 'major way'. On 23 August, the song was released for digital download and streaming on iTunes and Spotify, respectively.

On 8 July 2017, French Montana released the track listing to his album Jungle Rules. Fe is credited as the original writer of track No. 1 "Whiskey Eyes" and sings the introduction to the album.

In an interview with MTV, French Montana stated he wanted her on the album after the executive producer, Rick Steel played her music to him.

== Artistry ==
=== Voice and music ===
Fe is mezzo-soprano. She was compared with Fiona Apple, Mazzy Star, Lana Del Rey and Lorde. Fe mixes different genres such as indie pop, dream pop, electronic and trip hop.
