= Careless World: Rise of the Last King =

Studio album by Tyga
- Released: February 21, 2012
- Recorded: 2009–11
- Studios: Ameraycan (Los Angeles); Chalice (Los Angeles); Conway (Hollywood); London Town (Los Angeles); Paramount (Los Angeles); Circle House (Miami); Hit Factory Criteria (Miami); Record Room (Miami)
- Genre: Hip hop
- Length: 79:24
- Labels: Cash Money; Universal Republic; Young Money
- Producers: Birdman (exec.); Lil Wayne (exec.); Mack Maine (exec.); Ronald "Slim" Williams (also exec.); Arthur McArthur; Boi-1da; Calvo Da Gr8; C.P Dubb; Cool & Dre; David D.A. Doman; Dnyc3; Jess Jackson; Key Wane; Mike Free; Mustard; Noah "40" Shebib; Pharrell Williams; Priya Prins; Supa Dups; Tyga

Tyga chronology
No Introduction (2008)	Careless World: Rise of the Last King (2012)	Hotel California (2013)

Singles from Careless World: Rise of the Last King
- 1. "Far Away" Released: May 17, 2011; 2. "Still Got It" Released: October 4, 2011; 3. "Rack City" Released: December 2, 2011; 4. "Faded" Released: January 13, 2012; 5. "Make It Nasty" Released: June 26, 2012

Careless World: Rise of the Last King is the second studio album by American rapper Tyga, released on February 21, 2012, by Cash Money Records, Universal Republic Records and Young Money Entertainment. It is his first album under a major label after his independent release, No Introduction. Production for the album took place during 2009 to 2011 and was handled by Jess Jackson, Arthur McArthur, Pharrell Williams, Boi-1da, and Noah "40" Shebib, among others. The album endured several release dates due to sampling credits, and experienced a limited release in retail stores due to an uncredited use of Martin Luther King Jr.'s "I've Been to the Mountaintop", which was his last speech before he was assassinated on April 4th, 1968. Despite the limited release, the album received strong digital downloads, and debuted at number four on the US Billboard 200 chart, selling 61,000 copies in its first week. The album has received generally positive reviews from music critics upon release.

== Release and promotion ==
=== Singles ===
The album's lead single, "Far Away" featuring Chris Richardson was released on May 17, 2011. The song peaked at number 86 on the US Billboard Hot 100. The album's second single, "Still Got It" featuring Drake was released on October 4, 2011. The song peaked at number 89 on the US Billboard Hot 100.

The album's third single, "Rack City" was released on December 2, 2011. The song has peaked at number 7 on the Billboard Hot 100 and has reached platinum status by the Recording Industry Association of America (RIAA). The album's fourth single, "Faded" featuring Lil Wayne was released on January 13, 2012. The song peaked at number 33 on the US Billboard Hot 100. The album's fifth single, "Make It Nasty" was released on June 26, 2012.

=== Tour ===
Tyga announced via his website that he would tour in promotion of his new album. The ‘Careless World’ tour began in Salt Lake City, Utah at the Maverick Center on February 17, 2012, and ended in New Orleans, at the Howlin Wolf on April 15, 2012. In the same month Tyga would go on a world tour in Europe for 2 months.

== Critical reception ==
Professional ratings
Aggregate scores
Source	Rating
Metacritic	64/100
Review scores
Source	Rating
Allmusic	3.5/5 stars
HipHopDX	3.5/5 stars
Now	3/5 stars
Pitchfork Media	(6.7/10)
PopMatters	(4/10)
RapReviews	(7/10)
Rolling Stone	2.5/5 stars
Spin	(5/10)
The New York Times	favorable
XXL	(XL)

Careless World: Rise of the Last King received positive reviews from most music critics. At Metacritic, which assigns a normalized rating out of 100 to reviews from mainstream critics, the album received an average score of 64, based on 13 reviews, which indicates "generally favorable reviews". David Jeffries of Allmusic gave the album three and a half stars out of five, saying "Growth since his previous effort is obvious, both for the good (writing skills) and an arguable definition of bad." Joe Colly of Pitchfork Media gave the album a 6.7 out of 10, saying "Twenty-one tracks at nearly one-and-a-half hours is an insane length for an album with this kind of pop instinct. Set aside that complaint, though, and I'm left without much to pick at." Andrew Nosnitsky of Spin gave the album a five out of ten, saying "As a whole, though, Careless World is simply mediocre. Tyga wallows in the sort of joyless, affected seriousness that he hinted at on his Black Thoughts mixtape series."

Anupa Mistry of Now gave the album three out of five stars, saying "Careless World isn’t just Rack City plus 20 filler songs, thanks in large part to a phenomenal production team. The result is a slick, accessible rap record that’s about nine songs too long." Adam Fleischer of XXL gave the album an XL, saying "For all its highlights—and there are many— Careless World: Rise of the Last King still feels disjointed at moments. Even so, Tyga, still just 22-years-old, is growing as an artist, and reveals that there’s more to him than inescapable club jams, for anyone who may have been doubting. Plus, it sounds good, and that’s reason enough to care about the music of this album’s world." Edwin Ortiz of HipHopDX gave the album three and a half stars out of five, saying "Careless World perfectly reflects Tyga and the creative traits that he possesses. It’s serious when necessary, occasionally triumphant, and impressive enough that you have to consider him a force to be reckoned with. Likewise, it’s flawed, which is an indication that Tyga has the opportunity to elevate his skills."

David Amidon of PopMatters gave the album a four out of ten, saying "Careless World is what it is, and while that may not be much it’s professional and adequate enough that – daunting as its length may be – his fans should be satisfied and his detractors should be relieved to continue having little reason to pay him any mind." Steve Juon of RapReviews gave the album a seven out of ten, saying "At times the album feels bloated and excessive, but Tyga is only 22 years old. He'll learn to pare it down and keep only the best songs on future releases, which will hopefully not be as long delayed as this one was." Monica Herrera of Rolling Stone gave the album two and a half stars out of five, saying "Tyga's strength isn't in introspection, but curation. Pharrell Williams, Wale, Nas and J. Cole all guest, and those who don't are there in spirit: "Do It All" apes Kanye West's "Power," and "Black Crowns" ends with a voicemail message from Mom that would make even Drake squirt."

=== Controversy ===
Some controversy was aroused regarding the title track of the album, as Martin Luther King Jr.'s estate wanted to stop the sales of the album due to unauthorized usage of one of his speeches at the end of the album's opening track "Careless World". Tyga then tweeted that the issue had been resolved, and the release date would not be altered. New copies of the album, with the Martin Luther King Jr. speech removed, were shipped to stores.

== Commercial performance ==
Careless World: Rise of the Last King debuted at number four on the US Billboard 200, with first-week sales of 61,000 copies despite a limited release in retail stores due to the uncleared sample recall. As of April 2013, the album has sold 340,000 copies in the US. On March 19, 2020, the album was certified platinum by the Recording Industry Association of America (RIAA) for combined sales and album-equivalent units over a million units in the United States.

== Track listing ==
No.	Title	Writer(s)	Producer(s)	Length
1.	"Careless World"	Michael Stevenson; Jess Jackson; Jeremy McArthur; Christopher Tin; Robert Haigh	Arthur McArthur; Priya Prins^{[a]}	4:25
2.	"Lil Homie" (featuring Pharrell)	Stevenson; Pharrell Williams	Williams	3:54
3.	"Muthafucka Up" (featuring Nicki Minaj)	Stevenson; Jackson; Onika Maraj	Jackson	3:53
4.	"Echoes Interlude"	Stevenson; McArthur; Erik Alcock	Arthur McArthur	0:54
5.	"Do It All"	Stevenson; Jackson; George Clinton; William Collins; Gary Cooper; Marie Daulne; Sylvie Nawasadio	Jackson	4:54
6.	"I'm Gone" (featuring Big Sean)	Stevenson; Matthew Samuels; Sean Anderson; Jordan Evans; Matthew Burnett; Michael Moore; Floyd Bentley; Jeff Kleinman	Boi-1da	4:54
7.	"For the Fame" (featuring Chris Brown and Wynter Gordon)	Stevenson; Jackson; Christopher Brown; Diana Gordon	Jackson	3:52
8.	"Birdman Interlude"	Stevenson; McArthur; Bryan Williams	Arthur McArthur	0:50
9.	"Potty Mouth" (featuring Busta Rhymes)	Stevenson; Jackson; Dwane Weir; Trevor Smith	Key Wane	4:43
10.	"Faded" (featuring Lil Wayne)	Stevenson; Dwayne Carter; Donte Blacksher	Dnyc3	3:31
11.	"Rack City"	Stevenson; Dijon McFarlane; Mikely Adam	Mustard; Mike Free	3:28
12.	"Black Crowns" (featuring Cameron Forbes)	Stevenson; Jackson; David Doman; Cameron Lewis; Pier Luigi Salami; Danny Chaimson	D.A. Doman	5:25
13.	"Celebration" (featuring T-Pain)	Stevenson; Calvin Kenon; Faheem Najm	Calvo Da Gr8	3:01
14.	"Far Away" (featuring Chris Richardson)	Stevenson; Jackson; Christopher Richardson	Jackson	3:27
15.	"Mystic AKA Mado Kara Mieru Interlude"	Stevenson; Jackson; McArthur; Tin	Arthur McArthur	0:23
16.	"This Is Like" (featuring Robin Thicke)	Stevenson; Doman; James Lavigne; Robin Thicke; Mike Malarkey	D.A. Doman	4:17
17.	"King & Queens" (featuring Wale and Nas)	Stevenson; McArthur; Olubowale Akintimehin; Nasir Jones	Arthur McArthur	4:08
18.	"Let It Show" (featuring J. Cole)	Stevenson; Jermaine Cole; Andre Lyon; Marcello Valenzano	Cool & Dre	3:59
19.	"Love Game"	Stevenson	Jackson	7:34
20.	"Lay You Down" (featuring Lil Wayne)	Stevenson; Doman; Lavigne; Malarkey; Carter	D.A. Doman	4:04
21.	"Light Dreams" (featuring Marsha Ambrosius)	Stevenson	Jackson	3:48

Hidden Track (only appear on the physical copies of the album)
No.	Title	Writer(s)	Producer(s)	Length
22.	"Still Got It" (featuring Drake)	Stevenson; Aubrey Graham; Noah Shebib	Noah "40" Shebib	3:44

iTunes store exclusive bonus tracks
No.	Title	Writer(s)	Producer(s)	Length
22.	"Still Got It" (featuring Drake)	Stevenson; Aubrey Graham; Noah Shebib	Noah "40" Shebib	3:44
23.	"Make It Nasty"	Stevenson; Christopher Washington	C.P Dubb; Jess Jackson^{[a]}; Tyga^{[a]}	3:08

Notes

- ^{^a} signifies a vocal producer
- "Careless World", "Do It All" and "Love Game" feature additional vocals by Priya Prins.
- "Echoes Interlude" features background vocals by Erik Alcock.
- Tyga and Jess Jackson served as vocal producers for all tracks.

Sample credits

- "Careless World" contains a sample of "Mado Kara Mieru", written and performed by Christopher Tin; and elements of "Thru The Vibe", written by Robert Haigh, performed by Omni Trio.
- "Do It All" contains elements of "I’d Rather Be With You", written by George Clinton, William Collins and Gary Cooper, performed by Bootsy Collins; and elements of "Citoyen 120", written by Marie Daulne and Sylvie Nawasadio, performed by Zap Mama.
- "Mystic AKA Mado Kara Mieru Interlude" contains a sample of "Mado Kara Mieru", written and performed by Christopher Tin.
- "Let It Show" contains excerpts from "Let’s Make A Baby", written by Kenneth Gamble and Leon Huff, and performed by Billy Paul.

== Credits and personnel ==
Credits adapted from the album booklet.

Performance

- Micheal "Tyga" Stevenson – primary artist
- Sean "Big Sean"Anderson – featured artist
- Trevor "Busta Rhymes" Smith – featured artist
- Christopher "Chris Brown" Brown – featured artist
- Christopher "Chris Richardson" Richardson – featured artist
- Dwayne " Lil Wayne" Carter – featured artist
- Nasir "Nas" Jones – featured artist
- Onika "Nicki Minaj" Maraj – featured artist
- Pharrell Williams – featured artist
- Robin Thicke – featured artist
- Faheem "T-Pain" Najm – featured artist
- Olubowale "Wale" Akintimehin – featured artist
- Diana "Wynter Gordon" Gordon – featured artist

Producers

- Bryan "Birdman" Williams – executive producer
- Dwayne "Lil Wayne" Carter – executive producer
- Jermaine "Mack Maine" Preyan – executive producer
- Ronald "Slim" Williams – executive producer
- Christopher "C.P Dubb" Washington – producer
- Cool & Dre – producers
- Dijon "DJ Mustard" McFarlane – producer
- Donte "Dnyc3" Blacksher – producer
- Jess Jackson – producer
- Dwane "Key Wane" Weir – producer
- Noah "40" Shebib – producer
- Pharrell Williams – producer
- Priya "Priya Prins" Mariahi – vocal production
- Micheal "Tyga" Stevenson – vocal production
- Mikely "Mike Free" Adam – producer

Musicians}

- Danny Chaimson – guitars
- Dane Forrest – grand piano
- Hayley Hersh – grand piano, keyboards, guitar
- Jess Jackson – drums, keyboards, scratches
- Jason James – guitars
- Mike Malarkey – guitar, keyboards
- Priya "Priya Prins" Mariahi – additional vocals
- Pier Luigi Salami – grand piano, keyboards, synth

Technical

- Alton "AJ" Bates – engineer
- Josh Berg – recording assistant
- Joshua Berkman – engineer
- Michael "Banger" Cadahia – engineer
- Ariel Chobaz – engineer
- Andrew Coleman – engineer
- Thomas Cullison – recording assistant
- David "D.A." Doman – sound design, drum programming
- Elizabeth Gallardo – recording assistant
- Chris Gehringer – mastering
- Serban Ghenea – mixing
- John Hanes – Pro Tools engineer
- Jess Jackson – engineer, mixing, digital editing
- Mike Larson – engineer, digital editing
- Eric Racy – mixing
- Tim Roberts – mixing assistant
- Noah "40" Shebib – engineer
- Javier Valverde – engineer
- Finis “KY” White – engineer
- Kevin "Kev-O" Wilson – engineer

Miscellaneous

- Joshua Berkmans – A&R
- Sandra Brummels – creative direction
- Katina Bynum – product management
- Julius Erving – management
- Edward Grauer – legal
- Pamela Littky – photography

== Charts ==
=== Weekly charts ===
Chart (2012)	Peak position
Australia Urban Albums Chart (ARIA)	33
Belgian Albums Chart (Flanders)	117
Belgian Albums Chart (Wallonia)	145
Canadian Albums Chart	6
UK Albums Chart	56
US Billboard 200	4
US Top R&B/Hip-Hop Albums (Billboard)	1
US Top Rap Albums (Billboard)	1

=== Year-end charts ===
Chart (2012)	Position
US Billboard 200	96
US Top R&B/Hip-Hop Albums (Billboard)	18
Chart (2013)	Position
US Top R&B/Hip-Hop Albums (Billboard)	93

== Certifications ==
Region	Certification	Certified units/sales
United States (RIAA)	Platinum	1,000,000^{‡}
^{‡} Sales+streaming figures based on certification alone.
