= Still Got It =

Single by Tyga featuring Drake

from the album Careless World: Rise of the Last King
- Released: October 4, 2011
- Recorded: 2010–2011
- Genre: Hip hop
- Length: 3:43
- Label: Young Money; Cash Money; Republic
- Songwriters: Michael Stevenson; Aubrey Graham; Noah Shebib; Dwayne Chin-Quee
- Producers: Noah "40" Shebib; Supa Dups

Tyga singles chronology
"Far Away" (2011)	"Still Got It" (2011)	"Rack City" (2011)

Drake singles chronology
"It's Good" (2011)	"Still Got It" (2011)	"Round of Applause" (2011)

"Still Got It" is a song by American rapper Tyga featuring Canadian rapper Drake. The song was released on October 4, 2011, as the second single from the rapper's second studio album, Careless World: Rise of the Last King. The song was produced by Noah "40" Shebib and Supa Dups, appearing as a bonus track on the iTunes Store deluxe edition of the album and as a Hidden Track on the physical copies of this one. "Still Got It" marks the rapper's third consecutive release to impact the US Billboard Hot 100, debuting at number 89 for the chart week dated October 24, 2011; also peaking at number 70 on the US Hot R&B/Hip-Hop Songs.

== Track listing ==
Digital download
No.	Title	Length
1.	"Still Got It" (featuring Drake)	3:43

== Music video ==
The music video was filmed on New York Street at Paramount Studios in Hollywood, California. RichGirl's Audra Simmons is the lead girl in the video. Singer Teyana Taylor appears in the video. The music video premiered on BET's 106 and Park on April 30, 2012. Drake does not make an appearance in the video. The video, set in 1988 Harlem, depicts Tyga returning home reassuring that he has not changed while successfully vying for a former flame (Audra Simmons) which he succeeds in. Eventually, her jealous ex comes to a party and forcibly take her away as gunshots are heard.

== Chart performance ==
Still Got It made its first chart appearance on the US Billboard Hot 100 the chart week ending October 24, 2011. The single debuted at number 89, marking the third consecutive release from Tyga to do so. The song, which spent only one week on the chart, also debuted at number 70 on the Hot R&B/Hip-Hop Songs chart; peaking higher than previous track "Far Away" (2011) - which peaked at number 90.

== Charts ==
Chart (2011)	Peak position
US Billboard Hot 100	89
US Hot R&B/Hip-Hop Songs (Billboard)	70

== Release history ==
Country	Date	Format	Label
United States	October 4, 2011	Digital download	Young Money, Cash Money; Universal Republic
United Kingdom	October 14, 2011	Digital download	Young Money, Cash Money; Universal Republic
United States	November 8, 2011	Radio Airplay	Young Money, Cash Money; Universal Republic
