= Faded (Tyga song) =

2012 single by Tyga

Single by Tyga featuring Lil Wayne

from the album Careless World: Rise of the Last King
- Released: January 13, 2012
- Recorded: 2011
- Genre: Hip hop
- Length: 3:33
- Label: Young Money; Cash Money; Republic
- Songwriters: Michael Stevenson; Dwayne Carter; Donte Blacksher
- Producer: Dnyc3

Tyga singles chronology
"Rack City" (2011)	"Faded" (2012)	"Ayy Ladies" (2012)

Lil Wayne singles chronology
"The Motto" (2011)	"Faded" (2012)	"All Aboard" (2012)

"Faded" is a song by American rapper Tyga featuring Young Money-founder Lil Wayne. The song was first released on January 13, 2012, as the fourth single from the rapper's debut studio album, Careless World: Rise of the Last King (2012). For the chart dated May 27, 2012, "Faded" debuted at number 36 on the Billboard Hot 100 and peaked at number 33, marking Tyga's second highest-charting single at the time after "Rack City"; which peaked at number seven. It was released to US rhythmic radio stations on March 13, 2012. Complex named the song No. 42 of the best 50 songs of 2012.

== Music video ==
The music video was released on March 31, 2012, on MTV Hits. The video features Lil Wayne and Tyga with big heads in a scene. Tyga sits on a throne and a bed full of models while rapping and a scene where he is in a box and along others too, similar to the opening to the American sitcom The Brady Bunch. Fellow YMCMB artists Birdman and Mack Maine make cameo appearances in the video.

== Chart performance ==
The single debuted at number 36 on the Billboard Hot 100 chart and peaked at number 33. On May 23, 2014, the single was certified double platinum by the Recording Industry Association of America (RIAA) for sales of over two million units in the United States.

== Charts ==
=== Weekly charts ===
Chart (2012)	Peak position
US Billboard Hot 100	33
US Hot R&B/Hip-Hop Songs (Billboard)	19
US Hot Rap Songs (Billboard)	7
US Rhythmic Airplay (Billboard)	6

=== Year-end charts ===
Chart (2012)	Position
US Hot R&B/Hip-Hop Songs (Billboard)	86
US Hot Rap Songs (Billboard)	32
US On-Demand Songs (Billboard)	37
US Rhythmic (Billboard)	41

== Certifications ==
Region	Certification	Certified units/sales
United States (RIAA)	3× Platinum	3,000,000^{‡}
^{‡} Sales+streaming figures based on certification alone.
