= C.P Dubb =

Rapper

C.P. Dubb
- Born: Christopher Phyromm Washington; Inglewood, California, United States
- Origin: Los Angeles, California, United States
- Genres: Hip hop, R&B
- Occupation: Record producer
- Instrument: Reasons
- Labels: Cutcraft Music Group, Foot On Necks (current), Interscope (former)
- Website: www.CPDUBB.com

Christopher Phyromm Washington, better known by his stage name C.P DUBB, is an American record producer from Los Angeles. He is known best for his production work in hip hop music, most notably on French Montana's 2017 single "Unforgettable", Tyga's 2012 single "Make It Nasty", and A Boogie wit da Hoodie's 2016 single "Timeless"; each entered the Billboard Hot 100 — the former peaked within the top ten.

== Discography ==
=== 2011 ===
- E-40 – She Smashed The Homie
  - 01. "She Smashed The Homie" (Featuring Snoop Dogg and Ray J)
- Ben J
  - 01. "Tsunami Swagg" (featuring Mann)
- New Boyz – Too Cool To Care
  - 03. "Active Kingz" (Featuring Tyga)
- Casey Veggies – Said She Like Me (Single)
  - 01. "Said She Like Me"
- Casey Veggies – Sleeping in Class
  - 15. "Can I Live" (Featuring Mac Miller)
- Tyga – #BitchImTheShit
  - 03. "Make It Nasty"

=== 2012 ===
- Tyga – Careless World: Rise of the Last King
  - 23. "Make It Nasty"
- Honey Cocaine – #F*ckYoFeelings
  - 02. "Yo Own Thang"
  - 04. "Waiting Outside"
  - 12. "'Bout It"
  - 15. "Yellow B*tch"
- Audio Push – Truth Be Told
  - 16. "Shake It Up" (Featuring Iamsu)
- New Boyz – Foolie Tape
  - 02. "Rain Dance" (Featuring Cory Gunz)
  - 05. "Starters"

=== 2013 ===
- Soulja Boy – 23
  - 01. "Intro"
  - 02. "She Got Swag"
  - 04. "WTF"
- Tyga – Well Done IV
  - 10. "The Letter" (featuring Esty) (co-produced by J Holt)

=== 2014 ===
- Legacy – Dolo x II
  - 01. "Remember These Days"
  - 06. "Schemin" (co-produced by J Holt)

=== 2015 ===
- Kid Ink – Full Speed
  - 06. "Cool Back"
- Honey Cocaine –
  - "Sundae" (The Gift Rap)
