= Travis Porter =

American hip hop trio from Georgia

- Also known as: Hard Hitters
- Origin: Atlanta, Georgia, U.S.
- Genre: Southern hip-hop
- Works: Travis Porter discography
- Years active: 2008–present
- Labels: Porter House Music; Jive; RCA
- Producer(s): FKi

Travis Porter is an American hip hop trio from Atlanta, Georgia. The group consists of stepbrothers Ali and Quez, and their friend Strap, whom they met in middle school. The group released the biographical film Proud to be a Problem in May 2010, and signed with Jive Records to release their club-oriented debut single, "Make It Rain" in December of that year. It entered the Billboard Hot 100, along with its follow ups "Bring It Back" (remixed featuring Too Short) and "Ayy Ladies" (featuring Tyga)—the latter reached number 53 on the chart and received triple platinum certification by the Recording Industry Association of America (RIAA). All three preceded the release of their debut studio album From Day 1 (2012), which peaked at number 16 on the Billboard 200 and served as their only project on a major label.

== Music career ==
=== Musical beginnings ===
Travis Porter consists of Lakeem "Ali" Grant, Donquez "Quez" Woods and Harold "Strap" Duncan. During the early years, they started out as a group called the Hard Hitters, but later changed their name to Travis Porter to increase marketability. With their new name, the group toured across the United States before expanding their shows internationally. In 2008, the trio played in between cities, states, and even countries, including Kaiserslautern, Bamberg and Germany. Travis Porter garnered popularity through the release of their mixtapes, and expanding number of performances. To date, the group's four biggest underground hits are: "Black Boy, White Boy", "Uh Huh", "Go Shorty Go", and "All the Way Turnt Up". During the summer of 2010, the group appeared in one of Atlanta's biggest concerts, Birthday Bash and on The Mo'Nique Show. They even performed with Canada's own Drake at BMI's Unsigned Artist showcase in Atlanta. Even though they were being unsigned, they still were working with most notable signed artists, such as Roscoe Dash, Fast Life Yungstaz and Waka Flocka Flame. Travis Porter was also featured on MTV Jams Feb 5. The group also received Myspace's #1 unsigned group title. In 2010, the group's non-album single, "Go Shorty Go" would be entering on the Billboard's Top R&B/Hip-Hop chart. They also has recently joined with the Broadcast Music Incorporated (BMI). The trio was honored at the 2010s Underground Music Awards in New York City, with other well-known underground artists, such as J. Cole; along with getting nominated for the “Most Dynamic Rap Group Duo”. Gucci Mane reportedly announced the interest in signing the group Travis Porter to 1017 Brick Squad Records, saying "Just give me 12-15 songs. I don't know about that other stuff. Handle your business". But the group would eventually end up signing a record deal to Jive Records.

=== 2010-2012: From Day 1 ===
On December 22, 2010, the trio released their debut single, "Make It Rain", which peaked at number 50 on the Urban radio charts and debuted on the charts at number 97 before climbing to number 46. On October 7, 2011, RCA Music Group announced the disbandment of Jive Records, along with Arista Records and J Records. With the shutdown, the group (and all other artists previously signed to these three labels) announced that they would have to release their future materials to RCA Records. On February 7, 2011, Travis Porter released their second single, titled "Bring It Back".

In 2012, the trio released their third single, "Ayy Ladies", a collaboration with Young Money rapper Tyga. The single peaked at number 56 on the Billboard Hot 100, and has topped the Top Heatseekers Songs charts, becoming Porter's most successful song to date. The group's debut album, From Day 1 was released on May 29, 2012, under RCA Records and the group's own Porter House Music record label. From Day 1 charted at number 16 on the US Billboard 200 and number 2 on the Top Rap Albums charts.

=== 2013-present ===
On March 5, 2013, Travis Porter released their eleventh mixtape, titled Mr Porter.

On June 3, 2014, Travis Porter released their twelfth mixtape, titled Music Money Magnums 2, which is the sequel to their mixtape Music Money Magnums.

On April 15, 2015, Travis Porter released their thirteenth mixtape, titled 3 Live Krew. Its mixtape cover is based on 2 Live Crew's critically acclaimed album As Nasty As They Wanna Be. On August 21, 2015, Travis Porter released their fourteenth mixtape, titled S.A.Q..

On January 18, 2016, Travis Porter released their fifteenth mixtape, titled 285.

== Other ventures ==
=== Acting career ===
Travis Porter starred in their debut movie Red Rock, released on November 20, 2012.

== Controversy ==
=== Roscoe Dash ===
The track "All the Way Turnt Up" has caused controversy with Roscoe Dash. Dash stated that he came up with the song, including the hook and the lyrics and even asked the group Travis Porter to appear on this song. Travis Porter then added this song to their mixtape, which caused fans to believe that this was not Roscoe Dash's song, but Travis Porter's. Roscoe Dash then released a remixed version to the song through his label Interscope Records, adding a verse by a fellow rapper Soulja Boy.

=== Young Dro and Yung L.A. ===
The group's song, titled "Black Boy, White Boy" caused a controversy when rappers Young Dro and Yung L.A. said that the song title was initially theirs.

== Discography ==
Studio albums

- From Day 1 (2012)
- Travy Estates: Back On Bulls**t (2021)

== Filmography ==
Film
Year	Film	Role	Notes
2012	Red Rock	As themselves	Co-directed and co-produced
