= Mother Russia (Fe song) =

Song by Fe
- Released: 4 October 2013
- Recorded: 2013
- Genre: Indie pop, dream pop
- Length: 3:07
- Songwriter(s): Maria Knight

"Mother Russia" is a song by British singer-songwriter Fe. It was released on SoundCloud on 4 October 2013.

== Background and composition ==
"Mother Russia" is an indie pop ballad with dream pop influences. On 4 October 2013, Fe announced via Facebook that she will be posting a "smokey" track that night. Nine hours later, she finally released "Mother Russia" as her third independent single. A remix of the song was uploaded to Fe's personal SoundCloud account.

== Critical reception ==
"Mother Russia" received high acclaim from music critics. Indie music blog Pigeons & Planes said that the song is "a little more than an organ, some ambient strings, and Fe's soft, pillowy voice cooing in your ear." Petar Kujundzic of Hypetrak.com highlighted the singer's vocal abilities. Clyde Barretto of Prefixmag.com described the song as "sweet and chilling as vanila ice cream". Music blog My Day By Day Music wrote, "daring you to kiss the mist, Fe's icy vocals whisper majestically from her latest track 'Mother Russia', pining seductively beneath a whirlwind of haunting choral synths, echoey vocals and twinkling chimes." Iamnewmusic.com named "Mother Russia" as the second best song of ح2013.
