= FKi 1st =

American record producer

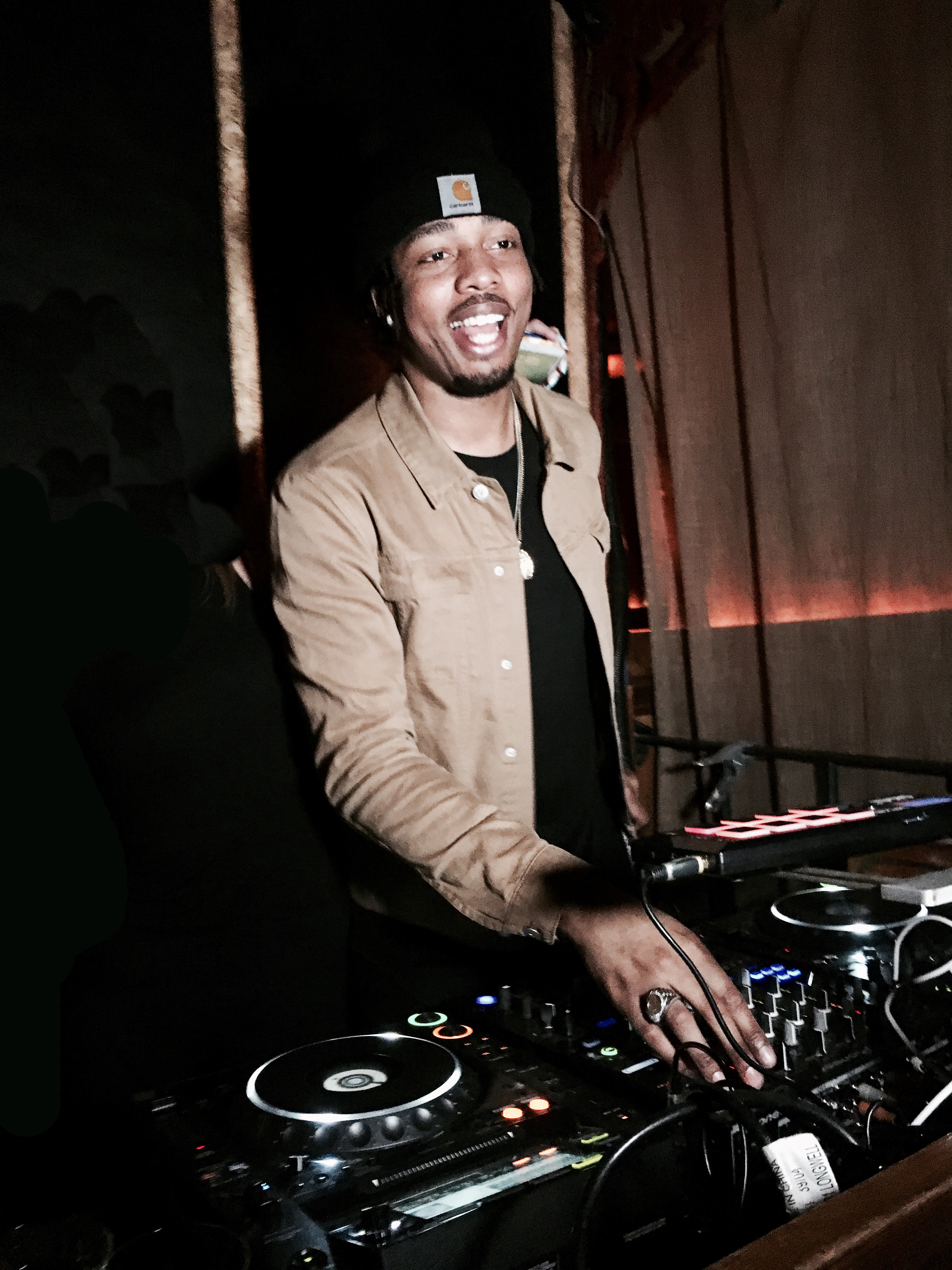
- Roberts in 2022

Background information
- Also known as: 1$T, 1st Down
- Born: Trocon Markous Roberts Jr. November 20, 1989 (age 36)
- Origin: Atlanta, Georgia, U.S.
- Genres: Southern hip-hop; EDM
- Occupations: Rapper; singer; songwriter; record producer
- Instruments: Drums; vocals
- Years active: 2009–present
- Labels: Zooly; Mad Decent
- Website: thegoodgas.co

Trocon Markous Roberts Jr. (born November 20, 1989), better known by his stage name FKi 1st, $1T or 1st Down, is an American rapper, singer, songwriter, DJ, and record producer. He first became known as one half of the Atlanta-based production duo FKi with fellow producer SauceLordRich (or Daye Rich), which was formed in 2007. The duo produced for music industry artists in hip-hop and contemporary R&B during the 2010s, resulting in credits on Billboard Hot 100-charting singles such as "Dope" by Tyga, "Watch Out" by 2 Chainz, "Make It Rain", "Bring It Back" and "Ayy Ladies" by Travis Porter, as well as the quadruple platinum-certified "Weekend" by Mac Miller. In his solo work, Roberts has co-produced or co-wrote the singles "Work" (2013) for Iggy Azalea, "White Iverson" (2015) and "Deja Vu" (2016) for Post Malone, and "Pick It Up" (2017) for Famous Dex.

== Early career ==
Prior to his musical career, Roberts was a cashier for Sam's Club.

== Career ==
=== Beginnings ===
Roberts embarked on his music career in the production and songwriting team FKi with Sauce Lord Rich. The duo grew up together in Atlanta, Georgia. When they first met, they realized they had the same music interests and tastes and started to build their own production company. The duo studied audio engineering at Full Sail University.

FKi subsequently began working with Collipark Music, where they were introduced to Travis Porter and produced the singles "Make it Rain" and "Bring it Back", inside a basement with a microphone and an Mbox. In 2009, FKi shared studio space with Jon Jon Traxx, Iggy Azalea (then known by her birth name, Amethyst Kelly), and Natalie Sims.

In 2011, Roberts met American EDM producer Diplo at a small local club in Atlanta, who introduced him to Iggy Azalea. They flew out to Los Angeles to Mad Decent studios and to produce Azalea's TrapGold (2012) mixtape, which Roberts also executive produced. He opened for her TrapGold European tour.

=== 2014–2015 ===
In 2014, Roberts met Post Malone and contributed to his breakout single "White Iverson". It was released on SoundCloud and received one million plays within three weeks.

Hisborger noteworthy productions include "Watch Out" and "A Milli Billi Trilli" for 2 Chainz, "Weekend" by Mac Miller, "Sloppy Toppy" by Travis Scott, and "Pleazer" by Tyga, among others more. Alongside these tracks, Roberts produced a songs from Lil Uzi Vert's debut mixtape with DJ Drama and Don Cannon's Generation Now label, Luv Is Rage (2015)—"Moist", "Wit My Crew x 1987", and "Nuyork Nights at 21".

Roberts has DJ'ed at numerous events such as Low End Theory, Brownies & Lemonade, Trap City, Control Avalon, and more. In August 2015, he opened for Rita Ora at the El Rey theatre in Los Angeles and Drais Beach Club in Las Vegas. He also did so at Mad Decent's Mad Decent Block Parties in Los Angeles, Brooklyn, and Phoenix during 2017.

=== 2016–2017 ===
In May 2016, FKi 1st released his solo EP First Time For Everything on Mad Decent. The EP features artists including Post Malone, Njomza, ILoveMakonnen, and Danny Seth.

In April, FKi 1st joined Diplo & Friends at the Heineken House at Coachella. He also went on to tour with Fetty Wap on his Welcome to the Zoo Tour, Justin Bieber's Purpose Tour, and Post Malone's Hollywood Dreams Tour. Roberts won a BMI R&B Hip Hop Award for his work on "White Iverson". Roberts was the executive producer for Post Malone's debut album Stoney. Roberts teamed up with fellow Atlanta rappers Drugrixh Peso and Yakki to release the single "Do What Bosses Do" through his own label Zooly the Label.

=== 2018–present ===
In February 2018, he started the Good Gas series of albums featuring artists such as 2 Chainz, ASAP Ferg, and MadeinTYO.

He released the album Tokyo Project in December 2019. During 2020, Roberts produced Don Toliver's "Crossfaded", Kash Doll's "Wake Up", S3nsi Molly's "Don't Call Me Bo" and Parlay Pass's "Honda". In April of that year, Roberts and singer Victoria Kimani released the collaborative album Afreaka.

On April 1, 2021, the Street Dream Team album was released and featured Roberts, Band Gang Lonnie Bands and Good Gas. In the following June, Roberts and Good Gas released the song "Bushido" for the Fast and the Furious 9 soundtrack.

On June 1, 2022, Roberts released the album Last Player Alive; its deluxe edition contains guest appearances from Kash Doll, Buddy, Guapdad 4000, Twista, Coco Jones, and 8Ball & MJG. That same year, he produced 2 Chainz's single "Neighbors Know My Name" and Peezy's song "Hustlers Vs. Scammers".

== Musical style ==
FKi 1st's musical style ranges from trap to EDM. He has referred to himself as the "black Diplo."

His record production and songwriting team, FKi, does a blend of glitch hop, hip-hop, drum and bass and trap. Their sound was first heard on their premier mixtape Transformers n the Hood, which was presented and produced by Diplo, alongside HXV as well as Mayhem, and received attention from electronic, hip-hop and trap music forums throughout the US and abroad. FKi went on to produce Iggy Azalea's entire TrapGold and in 2012 served as the official DJs for her European tour. FKi has also collaborated with other producers like Borgore, Flosstradamus, The Invisible Men and Diplo, among others.

== Discography ==
=== Solo albums ===
- First Time for Everything Part 1 (2016)
- Tokyo Project (2019)
- Last Player Alive (2022)
- Last Player Alive (Deluxe) (2022)

== Productions ==
List of songs produced, co-produced and remixed by title, with performing artists and other credited producers, showing year released and album name
| Title | Year | Artist(s) | Album |
|---|---|---|---|
| Last Player Alive (Deluxe) | 2022 | FKi 1st, Kash Doll, Buddy, Peezy, Rizz Capolatti, Pimpin Ken, Guapdad 4000, Twista, Coco Jones, Teddy Ray, MJG, & 8Ball. | Last Player Alive (Deluxe) |
| Last Player Alive | 2022 | FKi 1st | Last Player Alive |
| Hustlers Vs Scammers | 2022 | Peezy | Only Built For Diamond Links |
| Tokyo Project | 2019 | FKi 1st | Tokyo Project |
| Interlude | 2022 | Peezy | Only Built For Diamond Links |
| Neighbors Know My Name | 2022 | 2Chainz | Dope Don't Sell Itself |
| Crossfaded | 2021 | Don Toliver | Life Of A DON |
| Street Dream Team | 2021 | Good Gas, FKi 1st, Band Gang Lonnie Bands | Street Dream Team |
| Bushido | 2021 | Good Gas, JP The Wavy | F9: The Fast Saga Soundtrack |
| Afreaka | 2020 | FKi 1st, Victoria Kimani | Afreaka |
| Wake Up | 2020 | Kash Doll | (Single) |
| Don't Call Me Boo | 2020 | FKi 1st, S3nsi Molly | (Single) |
| Velvet | 2019 | FKi 1st | Tokyo Project |
| IROC | 2019 | FKi 1st | Tokyo Project |
| Tokyo Freestyle | 2019 | FKi 1st | Tokyo Project |
| Good Gas Vol. 3 | 2019 | Good Gas | Good Gas Vol. 3 |
| FreaK ModE (ft. FKi 1st) | 2019 | 3030 | Tropicalia |
| I'm Not Crazy, Life Is | 2019 | 2 Chainz | Rap or Go to the League |
| Jumping Out The Window | 2019 | Key! | SO EMOTIONAL |
| Me & You | 2018 | Njomza | Vacation |
| On Go Freestyle (ft. 10k.Caash, G.U.N & FKi 1st) | 2018 | Good Gas | On Go Freestyle |
| Good Gas Vol. 2 | 2018 | Good Gas | Good Gas, Vol. 2 |
| Ice Me Out | 2018 | Kash Doll | Ice Me Out |
| A&T | 2018 | 21 Savage | I Am > I Was |
| Please Believe (Ft. FKi 1st & Allen Ritter) | 2018 | Fossa Beats | Falling Up |
| Que Lo Que | 2018 | Ratchéton | Que Lo Que |
| Like That | 2018 | Kris Wu | Antares |
| Freedom | 2018 | Kris Wu, Jhene Aiko | Antares |
| R.I.P Screw | 2018 | Travis Scott | Astroworld |
| 5% Tint | 2018 | Travis Scott | Astroworld |
| How I Feel | 2018 | Good Gas, ASAP Ferg, 2 Chainz | Good Gas, Vol. 1 |
| Drippy | 2018 | Good Gas, Zuse | Good Gas, Vol. 1 |
| Good Gas | 2018 | Good Gas, MadeinTYO, UnoTheActivist | Good Gas, Vol. 1 |
| Y3 | 2018 | Good Gas | Good Gas, Vol. 1 |
| Notice Me | 2018 | Migos, Post Malone | Culture II |
| Love N’ Hennessy REMIX | 2018 | A. Chal, 2 Chainz, Nicky Jam | ON GAZ |
| Healthy | 2018 | Larry June, Jazz Cartier, FKi 1st | You're Doing Good |
| Alive | 2018 | Lil Jon, Offset, 2 Chainz | Alive |
| Phone | 2017 | Smokepurpp, Nav | Phone |
| Do What Bosses Do | 2017 | FKi 1st, Drugrixch Peso, Yakki | Do What Bosses Do (feat. Drugixh Pedo & Yakki) |
| Pick It Up | 2017 | Famous Dex ft. ASAP Rocky | Dex Meets Dexter |
| Realize | 2017 | 2 Chainz, Nicki Minaj | Pretty Girls Like Trap Music |
| OG Kush Diet | 2017 | 2 Chainz | Pretty Girls Like Trap Music |
| Caskets | 2017 | Party Favor, Njomza | Caskets (feat. FKi 1st) |
| Run Up (Official Remix) | 2017 | Major Lazer, Nicki Minaj, PARTYNEXTDOOR | Major Lazer Essentials |
| Love N Hennessy | 2017 | A. Chal | ON GAZ |
| Money Made Me Do It | 2016 | Post Malone, 2 Chainz | Stoney |
| Feel | 2016 | Post Malone, Kehlani | Stoney |
| No Option | 2016 | Post Malone | Stoney |
| Broken Whiskey Glass | 2016 | Post Malone | Stoney |
| Cold | 2016 | Post Malone | Stoney |
| Came Up | 2016 | Flosstradamus, FKi 1st, Post Malone, Key!, Graves | |
| Let Me Love You | 2016 | Ariana Grande, Lil Wayne | Dangerous Woman |
| Deja Vu | 2016 | Justin Bieber, Post Malone | Stoney |
| Forever | 2015 | FKi 1st, iLoveMakonnen, Santigold | |
| Nuyork Nights at 21 | 2015 | Lil Uzi Vert | Luv Is Rage |
| Wit My Crew x 1987 | 2015 | Lil Uzi Vert | Luv Is Rage |
| Moist | 2015 | Lil Uzi Vert | Luv Is Rage |
| I Can Tell | 2015 | Travis Scott | Rodeo |
| Weekend | 2015 | Mac Miller, Miguel | GOO:OOD AM |
| A Milli Billi Trilli | 2015 | 2 Chainz, Wiz Khalifa | Trap-A-Velli Tre' |
| Watch Out | 2015 | 2 Chainz | ColleGrove |
| Pleazer | 2015 | Tyga, Boozie Badazz | The Gold Album: 18th Dynasty |
| On God | 2015 | Zuse, Post Malone | |
| White Iverson | 2015 | Post Malone | White Iverson |
| 12 Bricks | 2014 | OG Maco | OG Maco |
| Issue | 2014 | Ty Dolla Sign, Wiz Khalifa | Taylor Gang |
| Missionary | 2014 | Ty Dolla Sign, FKi 1st | Ty $ |
| Drugs You Should Try | 2014 | Travis Scott | Days Before Rodeo |
| Sloppy Toppy | 2014 | Travis Scott, Migos, Peewee Longway | Days Before Rodeo |
| 459 | 2014 | YG, Natasha Moseley | My Krazy Life |
| Get TF Out My Face | 2014 | Rich Homie Quan, Young Thug | I Promise I Will Never Stop Going In |
| Hell You Sayin' | 2014 | Iggy Azalea, Travis Scott, T.I., Young Dro | |
| Work | 2013 | Iggy Azalea | The New Classic |
| Dope | 2013 | Tyga, Rick Ross | Hotel California |
| F.D.B. | 2013 | Young Dro | High Times |
| All The Time | 2013 | Jeremih, Lil Wayne, Natasha Mosley | Magic Mike XXL Soundtrack |
| Employee of the Month | 2013 | 2 Chainz, Diplo, FKi 1st | B.O.A.T.S. II: Me Time |
| Cranberry Moonwalk | 2013 | B.o.B, Mike Fresh | Underground Luxury |
| Decisions | 2013 | Borgore | #NEWGOREORDER |
| Ayy Ladies | 2012 | Travis Porter | From Day 1 |
| Bring It Back | 2011 | Travis Porter | From Day 1 |
| Make It Rain | 2011 | Travis Porter | From Day 1 |
