= Far Away (Tyga song) =

Single by Tyga featuring Chris Richardson

from the album Careless World: Rise of the Last King
- Released: May 17, 2011
- Recorded: 2011
- Genre: Pop rap
- Length: 3:27
- Label: Young Money; Cash Money; Republic
- Songwriters: Michael Stevenson; Christopher Richardson
- Producer: Jess Jackson

Tyga singles chronology
"Loyalty" (2010)	"Far Away" (2011)	"Still Got It" (2011)

Chris Richardson singles chronology
"Floating Off the Ground" (2009)	"Far Away" (2011)	"In the Name of Love" (2012)

"Far Away" is a song by American rapper Tyga featuring American Idol finalist Chris Richardson. The song was first released on May 17, 2011 as the lead single from the rapper's debut studio album, Careless World: Rise of the Last King (2012). The song, which was produced by British producer Jess Jackson, debuted at number 98 on the US Billboard Hot 100 for the chart dated August 20, 2011, reaching a peak of number 86 for the chart dated October 1, 2011. The track also peaked at number 93 on the US Hot R&B/Hip-Hop Songs and number 16 on the US Hot Rap Songs. As of January 25, 2012, "Far Away" has sold approximately 303,000 copies in the US. On March 19, 2020, the single was certified gold by the Recording Industry Association of America (RIAA) for combined sales and album-equivalent units over 500,000 units in the United States.

== Artwork ==
The cover depicts Tyga with a field and a railroad pictured in the background implying that he is travelling to the one who is described in the song as being "Far Away". Ology commented on the official artwork for the single by saying that it was reminiscent of Eminem's Recovery album cover released last year.

== Background ==
In an interview with Artistdirect, Chris Richardson explained the concept behind the song:

"Far Away" is about the feeling of being so far away from someone you love. It portrays that of when we mess up and we want to make amends. Your relationship means the world to you, and you'd do anything for your significant other. You'd walk a thousand miles for that person. It's that whole love connection. "Far Away" tells a story of how the guy in the relationship has done wrong, and it might be too late because his girl might be off and gone with someone else.

== Critical reception ==
PopCrush gave the song a four out of five stars and noted that the performance by Richardson really brightened up the track with a "soulful hook". They also commented on the track by saying "The appealing melody and lyrical depth make ‘Far Away’ a definite winner." Ology negatively received the song and commented on it by saying "The thing that's killing this track is the beat, because Tyga doesn't have the voice for it. This is a record meant for someone along the lines of Lupe or XV. Probably Drake too, but none of us want to resort to that. The Chris Richardson vocals add that pop-hop element to the hook, and the guitar-happy bars pump the pop even further, and with Tyga's voice, it's a juxtaposition that clashes a bit too much for success."

== Music video ==
The official video for "Far Away" was released on July 27, 2011 and has since gained over twenty million views on YouTube. The video is based around a story in which Tyga tries to re-unite with his girlfriend. The girl dies in a fatal car accident near the end of the video which creates a sense of separation for Tyga.

== Track listing ==
Digital download
No.	Title	Length
1.	"Far Away" (featuring Chris Richardson)	3:27

== Charts ==
=== Weekly charts ===
Chart (2011)	Peak position
US Billboard Hot 100	86
US Hot R&B/Hip-Hop Songs (Billboard)	93
US Hot Rap Songs (Billboard)	16
US Rhythmic Airplay (Billboard)	11

=== Year-end charts ===
Chart (2011)	Position
US Rhythmic (Billboard)	46

== Certifications ==
Region	Certification	Certified units/sales
United States (RIAA)	Gold	500,000^{‡}
^{‡} Sales+streaming figures based on certification alone.

== Release history ==
Country	Date	Format	Label
United States	May 17, 2011	Digital download	Young Money + Cash Money
United States	October 11, 2011	Mainstream airplay	Young Money + Cash Money
United Kingdom	December 26, 2011	Digital download	Young Money + Cash Money
