= Rack City =

Single by Tyga

from the album Careless World: Rise of the Last King
- Released: December 2, 2011
- Genre: Hip hop; hyphy
- Length: 3:28
- Label: Young Money; Cash Money; Republic
- Songwriters: Michael Stevenson; Dijon McFarlane; Mikely Adam
- Producers: DJ Mustard; Mike Free

Tyga singles chronology
"Still Got It" (2011)	"Rack City" (2011)	"Faded" (2012)

Audio sample
- "Rack City": file; help

Music video
- "Rack City" (Explicit) on YouTube

"Rack City" is a song by American rapper Tyga. First released on December 2, 2011, the song served as the third single from his second studio album, Careless World: Rise of the Last King (2012). It was produced by DJ Mustard and Mike Free. It reached a peak of number seven on the US Billboard Hot 100 and number 53 on the Canadian Hot 100.

== Background ==
The song originally appeared on Tyga's mixtape, Well Done 2 (2011). On November 19, 2011, Rap-Up announced that "Rack City" would be released to the iTunes Store in the United States as the second single from Careless World: Rise of the Last King.

== Music video ==
The music video for "Rack City," directed by Chris Robinson, has been on YouTube since January 10, 2012, and has over 78 million views. Tyga's former girlfriend, Blac Chyna, played the main female role and is seen stripping on him. The music video to the official remix of "Rack City" that features rappers Wale, Fabolous, Young Jeezy, Meek Mill and T.I. officially aired on MTV Jams as of February 24, 2012, and was directed by Alex Nazari. This video has over 33 million views on YouTube.

== Remixes ==
The official remix consists of freestyles taken from rappers who made their own remixes, Wale's verse comes from his Rack City remix which features Black Cobain. Fabolous's verse comes from his Black City remix, Young Jeezy's verse comes from his Rack City remix and Meek Mill's T.I.'s verses were arranged especially for the remix. Gucci Mane released a freestyle of the track. Rye Rye released a remix of the song as well with her female side of the rack city song. Yelawolf released a LA Lakers remix of the song. B.o.B released a video for his remix to exclusively promote his Mixtape E.P.I.C. (Every.Play.Is.Crucial) and Trae Tha Truth also released a freestyle to the track. Honey Cocaine also freestyled to the song. Tory Lanez released a freestyle to the song. Former Missy Elliott protégée Brianna Perry also freestyled off this record for her 2011 mixtape Face Off.

YouTube personality Jack Douglass wrote a parody called "Jack City" about his videos; lifecaster iJustine created a parody called "Mac City"; IFHT also created a parody called "Cat City".

Wrestler Brock Lesnar was caught insulting Roman Reigns with “Suplex City, bitch!” on a ringside microphone at Wrestlemania 31 after hitting him with a number of German suplexes during their bout. Cleveland-based hip hop artist PFV remixed this quote into a wrestling version of Rack City.

Rapper Bun B created a remix called "Crush City", dedicated to the Houston Astros 2015 postseason run.

== Appearances in other media ==
- The music video for "50 Ways To Say Goodbye" by Train contains scenes of an obsessed audience fan holding up various signs of grief support throughout the video, the final sign humorously saying "Rack City, Bitch!"
- A local United States newspaper reported on an incident in which a woman fled from police officers after she was caught applying graffiti to buildings that contained the words "Rack City Bitch." The newspaper reported that, while the woman fled, she shouted "ten ten ten twenties on ya titties bitch" to the pursuing officers. After receiving widespread media attention the woman in question later clarified that the report was a hoax, published as a joke in a satirical university publication (similar to The Onion or The Harvard Lampoon).
- Tyga has a cameo in the 2016 film Boo! A Madea Halloween, during which he performed "Rack City".
- Rihanna used elements of the synths for the song for her song "What's My Name?", on her 777 Tour.

== Chart performance ==
For the chart dated December 10, 2011, "Rack City" debuted at number 94 on the US Billboard Hot 100. On its eighth charting week, dated January 28, 2012, the single rose 15 places to number eight - marking Tyga's first solo top 10 single. The single spent two non-consecutive weeks in the top 10 before reaching a peak of number seven on the week ending February 18, 2012. "Rack City" has also reached the top 10 on the US Hot R&B/Hip-Hop Songs chart and US Rap Songs chart - having debuted at number 91 on the former for the chart dated November 26, 2011. On August 4, 2014, the single was certified quadruple platinum by the Recording Industry Association of America (RIAA) for sales of over four million units in the United States.

On the week ending February 4, 2012, "Rack City" made its debut on the UK Singles Chart, landing in at position 158. On its third charting week, the single rose 24 places to number 98. The track also charted on the R&B chart, reaching a peak of number 27 for the week ending February 18, 2012. It eventually peaked at number 39 in the UK and number 14 on the UK R&B chart.

== Track listing ==
Digital download
No.	Title	Length
1.	"Rack City"	3:28

== Charts ==
=== Weekly charts ===
Chart (2011–2012)	Peak position
Australia (ARIA)	56
Belgium (Ultratip Bubbling Under Flanders)	47
Canada Hot 100 (Billboard)	53
France (SNEP)	150
Germany (GfK)	60
Scottish Singles Sales (Official Charts)	70
UK Hip Hop/R&B (Official Charts)	12
UK Singles (Official Charts)	39
US Billboard Hot 100	7
US Hot R&B/Hip-Hop Songs (Billboard)	5
US Hot Rap Songs (Billboard)	2
US Pop Airplay (Billboard)	32
US Rhythmic Airplay (Billboard)	3

=== Year-end charts ===
Chart (2012)	Position
UK Singles (Official Charts Company)	179
US Billboard Hot 100	45
US Hot R&B/Hip-Hop Songs (Billboard)	31
US Hot Rap Songs (Billboard)	12
US Rhythmic (Billboard)	13

== Certifications ==
Region	Certification	Certified units/sales
Australia (ARIA)	Gold	35,000^{^}
Germany (BVMI)	Gold	150,000^{‡}
United Kingdom (BPI)	Gold	400,000^{‡}
United States (RIAA)	5× Platinum	5,000,000^{‡}
^{^} Shipments figures based on certification alone.^{‡} Sales+streaming figures based on certification alone.

== Release history ==
Country	Date	Format	Label
Australia	December 2, 2011	Digital download	Young Money; Cash Money; Republic
Belgium	December 2, 2011	Digital download	Young Money; Cash Money; Republic
Denmark	December 2, 2011	Digital download	Young Money; Cash Money; Republic
France	December 2, 2011	Digital download	Young Money; Cash Money; Republic
Italy	December 2, 2011	Digital download	Young Money; Cash Money; Republic
United Kingdom	December 2, 2011	Digital download	Young Money; Cash Money; Republic
United States	December 6, 2011	Digital download	Young Money; Cash Money; Republic
