= Ayy Ladies =

2012 single by Travis Porter featuring Tyga

Single by Travis Porter featuring Tyga

from the album Differenter 3 and From Day 1
- Released: January 27, 2012
- Recorded: 2011
- Genre: Hip-hop; bounce
- Length: 3:33
- Label: Porter House
- Songwriters: Lakeem Mattox; Donquez Woods; Harold Duncan; Micheal Stevenson; Trocon Roberts, Jr.
- Producer: FKi 1st

Travis Porter singles chronology
"Bring It Back" (2011)	"Ayy Ladies" (2012)	"Ride Like That" (2012)

Tyga singles chronology
"Faded" (2012)	"Ayy Ladies" (2012)	"Get Low" (2012)

Music video
- "Ayy Ladies" on YouTube

"Ayy Ladies" is a song by American hip-hop group Travis Porter featuring American rapper Tyga. It was first released on September 29, 2011, from Travis Porter's mixtape Differenter 3, before being released on January 27, 2012, as the third single from their debut studio album, From Day 1 (2012).

== Music video ==
The music video was directed by Alex Nazari, and sees Travis Porter roaming the halls of a hotel surrounded by women. The video also features cameos from Chris Brown and Meek Mill.

== Controversy ==
In October 2016, Travis Porter was sued by singer Jasmine Usher, who can be heard saying "Yeah" repeatedly in the song. Usher stated she was never paid, asking for royalties and a portion of future profits.

== Charts ==
Chart (2012)	Peak position
US Billboard Hot 100	53
US Hot R&B/Hip-Hop Songs (Billboard)	9
US Rap Songs (Billboard)	7

== Certifications ==
Region	Certification	Certified units/sales
United States (RIAA)	3× Platinum	3,000,000^{‡}
^{‡} Sales+streaming figures based on certification alone.
