= From Day 1 =

2012 album by Travis Porter

Studio album by Travis Porter
- Released: May 29, 2012
- Recorded: 2010–11
- Genres: Hip-hop, Southern hip-hop, pop rap
- Labels: Porter House, RCA
- Producers: Diplo, J.U.S.T.I.C.E. League, K.E. on the Track, Kane Beatz, B Beck, Lil Lody, Lil' C, FKi, J Mike, M16, ReederSZN

Travis Porter chronology
Differenter 3 (2011)	From Day 1 (2012)	Mr. Porter (2013)

Singles from From Day 1
- 1. "Make It Rain" Released: December 2, 2010; 2. "Bring It Back" Released: February 7, 2011; 3. "Ayy Ladies" Released: January 27, 2012; 4. "Ride Like That" Released: April 30, 2012

Professional ratings
Review scores
Source	Rating
AllMusic	3.5/5 stars
Complex	7/10
HipHopDX	2.5/5
XXL	3/5

From Day 1 is the debut studio album by American hip-hop group Travis Porter. It was released on May 29, 2012, by Porter House Music Group and RCA Records. The album was to be released under Jive Records. After RCA Music Group shut it down along with Arista Records and J Records, all prior signees (Travis Porter included) switched over to the RCA Records brand.

The album features guest appearances from 2 Chainz, Tyga, Jeremih, Mac Miller and Mike Posner, with production handled by Diplo, J.U.S.T.I.C.E. League, B Beck, Lil Lody, Lil' C, Kane Beatz, FKi, J Mike, M16, and KP on Da Beat.

== Track listing ==
Standard edition
No.	Title	Writer(s)	Producer(s)	Length
1.	"Aww Yea"	L. Mattox, H. Duncan, D. Woods, B. Birbeck	B Beck	3:29
2.	"Pop a Rubber Band"	A. Kearney, D. Woods, H. Duncan, L. Mattox	Lil Lody	3:48
3.	"Pussy Real Good" (featuring 2 Chainz)	T. Epps, H. Duncan, L. Mattox, D. Woods, C. Quinn	Lil' C	5:06
4.	"Wobble"	T. Wesley Pentz, D. Allen, L. Mattox, H. Duncan, D. Woods	Diplo, Derek "DJA" Allen	2:10
5.	"Ayy Ladies" (featuring Tyga)	L. Mattox, D. Woods, H. Duncan, M. Stevenson, T. Roberts, Jr.	FKi, DJ Spinz	3:33
6.	"Ride Like That" (featuring Jeremih)	L. Mattox, D. Woods, H. Duncan, J. Felton, D. Johnson	Kane Beatz, J Mike, MadMax	3:20
7.	"Flood This Shit"	L. Mattox, H. Duncan, D. Woods, J. Banks, J. Luellen	M16	3:45
8.	"Ballin'"	H. Duncan, D. Woods, L. Matox, C. Quinn	Lil' C	3:56
9.	"Party Time"	D. Woods, L. Mattox, H. Duncan, K. Erondu, L. Homles, J. Luellen, B. Simmons	K.E. on the Track	4:11
10.	"That Feeling" (featuring Mike Posner)	M. Posner, L. Mattox, D. Woods, H. Duncan, E. Ortiz, K. Bartolomei, K. Krowe, G. Hill	J.U.S.T.I.C.E. League, DJ Spinz	4:17
11.	"Bring It Back"	L. Mattox, D. Woods, H. Duncan, G. Hill	FKi, DJ Spinz	3:37
12.	"Make It Rain"	D. Woods, L. Mattox, H. Duncan, T. Roberts, Jr.	FKi	3:59

ITunes bonus tracks
No.	Title	Writer(s)	Producer(s)	Length
13.	"Bouncing Like (Whoa)" (featuring Mac Miller)	M. McCornick, D. Woods, L. Matox, H. Duncan, J. Kulousek	Big Jerm	4:21
14.	"Thirty Bands"	D. Woods, H. Duncan, L. Mattox	KP on Da Beat	3:41
Total length:				53:20

Samples credits

- "Ayy Ladies" contains a sample of "I Need a Hot Girl", performed and written by Byron Thomas, Brian Williams, Christopher Dorsey, Virgil Tab, Jr., and Dwayne Carter, Jr.

== Charts ==
Chart (2012)	Peak position
US Billboard 200	16
US Top R&B/Hip-Hop Albums (Billboard)	2
US Top Rap Albums (Billboard)	2

== Certifications ==
Region	Certification	Certified units/sales
United States (RIAA)	Gold	500,000^{‡}
^{‡} Sales+streaming figures based on certification alone.
