= Make It Rain (Travis Porter song) =

Single by Travis Porter

from the album From Day 1
- Released: December 2, 2010
- Genre: Hip hop
- Length: 3:59
- Label: Porter House
- Songwriters: Lakeem Mattox; Donquez Woods; Harold Duncan
- Producer: FKi

Travis Porter singles chronology
"Make It Rain" (2010)	"Bring It Back" (2011)

Music video
- "Make It Rain" on YouTube

"Make It Rain" is a song by American hip hop group Travis Porter. It was first released on July 14, 2010, before being released on December 2, 2010, as the debut and lead single from their debut studio album, From Day 1 (2012). The song was produced by FKi.

== Music video ==
The music video debuted on MTV Jams on December 19, 2010. In the Gabriel Hart-directed video, the owner of a dry corn farm watches an infomercial of Travis Porter saying that they will bring rain, and calls them. Once he opens a package delivered from a Porterville Express van, two farm girls approach the farm's silo, and Travis Porter appears in black suits and carrying yellow umbrellas. Eventually, Travis Porter hosts a party in a barn, filled with dancing.

== Remixes ==
On December 8, 2010, Travis Porter released a remix of the song featuring American rapper Rick Ross. Another remix featuring American rappers Yo Gotti and Gucci Mane was released on March 16, 2011. Other artists that have released a remix to the song include Jermaine Dupri, B.o.B and R. Kelly.

== Charts ==
Chart (2010-2011)	Peak position
US Billboard Hot 100	92
US Hot R&B/Hip-Hop Songs (Billboard)	15
US Rap Songs (Billboard)	9

== Certifications ==
Region	Certification	Certified units/sales
United States (RIAA)	Gold	500,000^{‡}
^{‡} Sales+streaming figures based on certification alone.
