= Bring It Back (Travis Porter song) =

2011 single by Travis Porter

Single by Travis Porter

from the album From Day 1
- Released: February 7, 2011
- Recorded: February 15, 2010
- Genre: Hip hop; bounce
- Length: 3:36 (single version); 4:37 (remix version)
- Label: Jive; Porter House
- Songwriters: Lakeem Mattox; Donquez Woods; Harold Duncan; FKi; Gary Hill
- Producers: FKi; DJ Spinz

Travis Porter singles chronology
"Make It Rain" (2010)	"Bring It Back" (2011)	"Ayy Ladies" (2012)

Music video
- "Bring It Back" on YouTube

"Bring It Back" is a song by the American rap group Travis Porter, released on February 7, 2011, as the second single from their first studio album, From Day 1 (2012). It is their second song to chart on the Billboard Hot 100, entering at #69 in the week ending April 1, 2011, and has since peaked at #75. The official remix version features fellow rapper Too Short, appears as a bonus track on the group's mixtape Music, Money, Magnums.

== Background and composition ==
The song was produced by FKi & DJ Spinz. "Bring It Back" has a more upbeat production compared to some of Travis Porter's other songs.

== Remixes ==
- Tyga
- Too Short
- Cali Swag District

== Music video ==
The music video was released to YouTube on March 16, 2011.

== Track listing ==
US digital single

No.	Title	Writer(s)	Producer(s)	Length
1.	"Bring It Back" (single version)	Lakeem Mattox, Donquez Woods, Harold Duncan, FKi & Gary Hill	FKi & DJ Spinz	4:20

== Charts ==
=== Weekly charts ===
Chart (2011)	Peak position
US Billboard Hot 100	69
US Hot R&B/Hip-Hop Songs (Billboard)	18
US Rap Songs (Billboard)	14

=== Year-end charts ===
Chart (2011)	Position
US Hot R&B/Hip-Hop Songs (Billboard)	52

== Certifications ==
Region	Certification	Certified units/sales
United States (RIAA)	2× Platinum	2,000,000^{‡}
^{‡} Sales+streaming figures based on certification alone.
