= Pluto 3D =

Studio album (reissue) by Future
- Released: November 27, 2012
- Recorded: 2012
- Genres: Hip hop; trap
- Length: 66:53
- Labels: Freebandz; A1; Epic
- Producers: K.E. on the Track; Sonny Digital; Mike WiLL Made It; Nard & B; Juicy J; Organized Noize; Luney Tunez; DJ Pharris; Will-A-Fool; Jon Boi; Da Honorable C.N.O.T.E.; John Blu

Future chronology
| Pluto (2012) | Pluto 3D (2012) | Honest (2014) |

Singles from Pluto 3D
- 1. "Neva End" Released: December 4, 2012

Pluto 3D is the reissue of American rapper and singer Future's debut studio album Pluto (2012). It was released on November 27, 2012, seven months after its parent album, by A1 Recordings, Freebandz Entertainment and Epic Records. Pluto 3D features three newly recorded songs and two official remixes. During the following week of the re-release, Pluto rose to number 75 on the US Billboard 200, selling 11,000 copies.

== Singles ==
"Neva End" was officially remixed, featuring a guest appearance from American singer Kelly Rowland. The song was produced by Mike WiLL Made It, and was released as Pluto 3D's lead single. Future premiered the song on October 16, 2012, and it was sent to rhythmic radio on December 4, 2012. The song debuted at number 99 on US Billboard Hot 100 and it later peaked at number 52.

== Promotion ==
On November 21, 2012, the music video for "Neva End (Remix)" premiered on 106 & Park. On November 27, 2012, Future performed the song along with Kelly Rowland on Jimmy Kimmel Live!, and later returned to perform "Turn On the Lights".

== Track listing ==
Pluto 3D
| No. | Title | Writer(s) | Producer(s) | Length |
|---|---|---|---|---|
| 1. | "The Future is Now" (featuring Big Rube) | Nayvadius Wilburn; Ruben Bailey; Michael Patterson | Future | 1:03 |
| 2. | "You Deserve It" | Wilburn; James Bernard Rosser, Jr.; Brandon Rackley; Gary Hill | Nard & B; DJ Spinz^{[a]} | 3:34 |
| 3. | "First Class Flights" | Wilburn; Sonny Corey Uwaezuoke | Sonny Digital | 3:34 |
| 4. | "Jealous" | Wilburn; Michael Williams; Marcus Anthony Bell | Mike WiLL Made It; Scool Boi^{[a]} | 3:41 |
| 5. | "Turn On the Lights" | Wilburn; Marquel Middlebrooks; Williams | Mike WiLL Made It; Marz^{[a]} | 4:08 |
| 6. | "Straight Up" | Wilburn; Rosser, Jr.; Rackley | Nard & B | 2:57 |
| 7. | "My" | Wilburn; Uwaezuoke | Sonny Digital | 3:04 |
| 8. | "Same Damn Time (Remix)" (featuring Diddy and Ludacris) | Wilburn; Uwaezuoke | Sonny Digital | 4:33 |
| 9. | "Neva End (Remix)" (featuring Kelly Rowland) | Wilburn; Pierre Slaugher; Williams; Timothy Thomas; Theron Thomas | Mike WiLL Made It; P-Nasty^{[a]} | 4:21 |
| 10. | "Tony Montana (Remix)" (featuring Drake) | Wilburn; Willie Byrd; Aubrey Graham; Rodney Hill, Jr. | Will-A-Fool | 4:05 |
| 11. | "Magic (Remix)" (featuring T.I.) | Wilburn; Kevin Erondu; Clifford Joseph Harris, Jr. | K.E. on the Track | 3:30 |
| 12. | "Homicide" (featuring Snoop Dogg) | Wilburn; Hill, Jr.; Jon Josef Miller; Calvin Broadus, Jr. | Jon Boi | 4:10 |
| 13. | "I'm Trippin'" (featuring Juicy J) | Wilburn; Jordan Houston | Juicy J | 4:41 |
| 14. | "Parachute" (featuring R. Kelly) | Wilburn; Robert Kelly; John Bluford; Pharris Thomas | John Blu; DJ Pharris^{[a]} | 4:09 |
| 15. | "Long Live the Pimp" (featuring Trae tha Truth) | Wilburn; Carlton Mays, Jr.; Frazie Thompson | Honorable C.N.O.T.E. | 3:28 |
| 16. | "Astronaut Chick" | Wilburn; Byrd | Will-A-Fool | 4:13 |
| 17. | "Permanent Scar" | Wilburn; Miller; Hill, Jr. | Jon Boi | 4:04 |
| 18. | "Truth Gonna Hurt You" | Wilburn; Asheton Hogan; Williams; Patterson | Mike WiLL Made It; A+^{[a]} | 3:38 |
| Total length: | | | | 66:53 |

iTunes bonus track
| No. | Title | Producer(s) | Length |
|---|---|---|---|
| 19. | "Go Harder" | Luney Tunez | 4:12 |

Notes

- ^{^[a]} signifies a co-producer

== Release history ==
| Region | Date | Format | Label | Ref. |
|---|---|---|---|---|
| United States | November 27, 2012 | CD, digital download | Epic Records | |
