= ILoveMakonnen (EP) =

EP by ILoveMakonnen
- Released: July 6, 2014
- Recorded: 2014
- Genres: Hip-hop; R&B
- Length: 28:29
- Labels: OVO Sound; Warner Bros.
- Producers: Drake (exec.); Sonny Digital; ILoveMakonnen; Metro Boomin; Mike Will Made It; Southside; TM88; DJ Spinz; Dun Deal; FKi; Phantom; Father

ILoveMakonnen chronology
Drink More Water 4 (2014)	ILoveMakonnen (2014)	Drink More Water 5 (2015)

Singles from ILoveMakonnen
- 1. "Tuesday" Released: September 1, 2014; 2. "Swerve" Released: December 15, 2014

ILoveMakonnen (stylized as I LOVE MAKONNEN) is the eponymous debut extended play by American recording artist ILoveMakonnen, released on December 15, 2014, through OVO Sound and Warner Records. It was originally released as a free EP on July 6, 2014, and as a mixtape. The EP's original version contains production from Metro Boomin, Sonny Digital, DJ Spinz, Dun Deal, FKi 1st (as FKi), and 808 Mafia members Southside and TM88, while the retail version contains additional production from Mike Will Made It, Phantom, and Father, alongside guest appearances from the latter artist, alongside Key! and Drake.

Two singles were released for the project. The first, "Tuesday" (featuring Drake), was originally titled "Club Goin' Up on a Tuesday", and was released as an official single on September 1, 2014. It would become iLoveMakonnen's most successful song to date, peaking at number 12 on the Billboard Hot 100 and being nominated for Best Rap/Sung Collaboration at the 57th Annual Grammy Awards. The second and final single, "Swerve", was later released that same year, on the 15th of December. Despite not originally being released as a single, a remix of "I Don't Sell Molly No More" was made, featuring Wiz Khalifa.

== Background and release ==
ILoveMakonnen was originally released as a free EP from the artist in July 2014. As a result of the success with the remixed version of "Club Goin’ Up on a Tuesday" by Drake, an EP was determined to be re-released in later in the year on December 15, 2014 through OVO Sound. The track list however cuts the original seven songs on the mixtape to mastered versions and two new songs on the purchaseable EP. A track titled "Swerve" would be the only new song to be released on the EP.

== Singles ==
"Tuesday" was released as the first single seven months prior to the release of the free EP as a digital download from the ILoveMakonnen mixtape. The song was eventually released as an official single on September 1, 2014. The single became Makonnen's most successful song to date, peaking at number twelve on the Billboard Hot 100. It was also nominated for Best Rap/Sung Collaboration at the 57th Annual Grammy Awards. The song would notably be covered by Burak Yeter and Danelle Sandoval, who released their version on the 12th of August, 2016, to worldwide chart success. The second single, "Swerve" was released on the 15th of December that year, and received minimal success in comparison to "Tuesday".

== Track listing ==
ILoveMakonnen – Original version
No.	Title	Writer(s)	Producer(s)	Length
1.	"Too Much"	Makonnen Sheran; Leland Wayne	Metro Boomin	2:58
2.	"I Don't Sell Molly No More"	Sheran; Sonny Uwaezuoke	Sonny Digital	3:04
3.	"Club Goin’ Up on a Tuesday"	Sheran; Uwaezuoke; Wayne	Sonny Digital; Metro Boomin	3:31
4.	"Tonight"	Sheran; Gary Hill; David Cunningham; Valentin Blavatnik	DJ Spinz; Dun Deal	4:32
5.	"Meant to Be"	Sheran; Trocon Markous Roberts	FKi	4:21
6.	"Sarah"	Sheran; Uwaezuoke; Wayne	Sonny Digital; Metro Boomin	3:03
7.	"Exclusive"	Sheran; Wayne; Joshua Luellen; Bryan Simmons	Metro Boomin; Southside; TM88	3:53

ILoveMakonnen – Retail version
No.	Title	Writer(s)	Producer(s)	Length
1.	"I Don't Sell Molly No More"	Makonnen Sheran; Sonny Uwaezuoke	Sonny Digital	3:04
2.	"Doubted" (featuring Key!)	Sheran; Marquis Devone Whittaker; Uwaezuoke	Sonny Digital	4:53
3.	"Tuesday" (featuring Drake)	Sheran; Aubrey Graham; Uwaezuoke; Leland Wayne	Sonny Digital; Metro Boomin	5:22
4.	"Rumor" (acoustic remix)	Sheran	iLoveMakonnen; Phantom	3:36
5.	"Swerve"	Sheran; Michael Williams	Mike Will Made It	4:28
6.	"Maneuvering"	Sheran; Wayne	Metro Boomin	3:31
7.	"Look At Wrist" (with Father & Key!)	Sheran; Whittaker	Father	3:33
Total length:				28:29
