= Same Damn Time =

Single by Future

Single by Future

from the album Pluto
- Released: March 24, 2012
- Recorded: 2011
- Studio: 11th Street Studios (Atlanta, Georgia)
- Genre: Trap
- Length: 4:33
- Label: A1; Freebandz; Epic
- Songwriters: Nayvadius Wilburn; Sonny Uwaezuoke
- Producer: Sonny Digital

Future singles chronology
"Magic" (2012)	"Same Damn Time" (2012)	"Turn On the Lights" (2012)

"Same Damn Time" is a song by American rapper Future. Written alongside producer and frequent collaborator Sonny Digital, it was released on March 24, 2012 as the third single (and fourth overall) from his debut studio album Pluto. Following its release, the song peaked at number 92 on the US Billboard Hot 100 and number 12 on the US Hot R&B/Hip-Hop Songs chart. The song was well received by music critics, and its title became a common phrase in music journalism, used to describe Future's work, as well as a number of other music-related topics.

== Background and release ==
"Same Damn Time" was originally recorded in 2011 and appeared on Future's mixtape Streetz Calling. The song was later re-mastered, including a slightly different instrumental, and released as a single from Pluto on March 24, 2012.

=== Accolades ===
SPIN placed the song at number 27 on their list of "40 Best Songs of 2012" with author Rob Harvilla enthusiastically writing: "It's infectious! It's repellant! At the same! Damn! Time! People love it! People hate it! At the same! Damn! Time! He's a mumbler! He's a shouter! At the same! Damn! Time! What a genius! What a doofus! At the same! Damn! Time!" Popdust included the song among the ten-song extension of their "Top 100 songs of the year" list.

== Music video ==
The official music video, directed by Dr. Teeth, was released on April 6, 2012. It features cameo appearances from DJ Drama, Waka Flocka Flame and Trae tha Truth. The video premiered on BET's show 106 & Park. The video was shot in Future's hometown Atlanta and was inspired by the hood. In an interview with MTV, Future claimed it was "more like a movie". Atlantic Records A&R DJ Drama, commented during the video shoot that "It's crazy in the streets, it's crazy in the club, Future seems to be kind of flawless right now." As of July 2014, the video's explicit and clean versions have combined over 11.8 million views on YouTube.

== Remixes ==
"Same Damn Time" had two official remixes. The first, featuring rappers Diddy (whose verse was written by Los), and Ludacris, was included on the re-release of Pluto, titled Pluto 3D. In an interview with XXL, Future commented on having Diddy perform on the remix: "Diddy brought that high energy, legendary status to the record. He used his own approach. He had something in his chest that I felt like he wanted to say and he let it all out. Another remix of the song had guest verses from Maybach Music Group's Rick Ross, Wale, Gunplay and Meek Mill.

== Critical reception ==
Eric Diep of Complex called the song "easily one of the hottest records in the clubs" and the "very best" among Future's "underground hits". David Drake, writing for The Fader, stated that it is "one of Future's biggest anthems." Jeremy Gordon of Vice commented that the song has become "a true sign of linguistic influence" and noted that its title has been used by many critics to describe Future's work in general. Jon Caramanica of New York Times used the song as a reference to show Future's musical style, calling him "a blustery hero and a bleeding cyborg—at the same damn time." LA Weekly also referred to the song, describing Future as "the father of Chaos and the son of Chaos at the same damn time." Andrew Unterberger of Popdust praised the song for having "one of the hip-hop hooks of the decade" and also commented that its remix with Diddy and Ludacris "takes it to the next level".

== Chart performance ==
Same Damn Time peaked at number 92 on the US Billboard Hot 100 chart and spent a total of 6 weeks. The song also peaked at number 12 on the US Hot R&B/Hip-Hop Songs chart.

== Charts ==
=== Weekly charts ===
Chart (2012)	Peak position
US Billboard Hot 100	92
US Hot R&B/Hip-Hop Songs (Billboard)	12
US Rhythmic Airplay (Billboard)	40

=== Year-end charts ===
Chart (2012)	Position
US Hot R&B/Hip-Hop Songs (Billboard)	63

== Certifications ==
Region	Certification	Certified units/sales
United States (RIAA)	Gold	500,000^{‡}
^{‡} Sales+streaming figures based on certification alone.
