= List of Billboard number-one R&B/hip-hop albums of 2012 =

This page lists the albums that reached number-one on the overall Top R&B/Hip-Hop Albums chart and the Rap Albums chart in 2012. The Rap Albums chart partly serves as a distillation for rap-specific titles from the overall R&B/Hip-Hop Albums chart.

== Chart history ==
Key
†	Indicates best-performing albums of 2012

Issue date	R&B/Hip-Hop Albums	Artist(s)	Rap Albums	Artist(s)	Refs.
January 7	Thug Motivation 103: Hustlerz Ambition	Young Jeezy	Thug Motivation 103: Hustlerz Ambition	Young Jeezy	
January 14	Take Care †	Drake	Take Care	Drake	
January 21	Take Care †	Drake	Take Care	Drake	
January 28	Take Care †	Drake	Take Care	Drake	
February 4	Take Care †	Drake	Take Care	Drake	
February 11	Soul 2	Seal	Take Care	Drake	
February 18	Take Care †	Drake	Take Care	Drake	
February 25	Take Care †	Drake	Take Care	Drake	
March 3	Take Care †	Drake	Take Care	Drake	
March 10	Careless World: Rise of the Last King	Tyga	Careless World: Rise of the Last King	Tyga	
March 17	Careless World: Rise of the Last King	Tyga	Careless World: Rise of the Last King	Tyga	
March 24	Take Care †	Drake	Take Care	Drake	
March 31	Take Care †	Drake	Take Care	Drake	
April 7	The OF Tape Vol. 2	Odd Future	The OF Tape Vol. 2	Odd Future	
April 14	The MF Life	Melanie Fiona	Take Care	Drake	
April 21	Pink Friday: Roman Reloaded	Nicki Minaj	Pink Friday: Roman Reloaded	Nicki Minaj	
April 28	Pink Friday: Roman Reloaded	Nicki Minaj	Pink Friday: Roman Reloaded	Nicki Minaj	
May 5	Pink Friday: Roman Reloaded	Nicki Minaj	Pink Friday: Roman Reloaded	Nicki Minaj	
May 12	Pink Friday: Roman Reloaded	Nicki Minaj	Pink Friday: Roman Reloaded	Nicki Minaj	
May 19	Strange Clouds	B.o.B	Strange Clouds	B.o.B	
May 26	This Is How I Feel	Tank	Strange Clouds	B.o.B	
June 2	Pink Friday: Roman Reloaded	Nicki Minaj	Pink Friday: Roman Reloaded	Nicki Minaj	
June 9	Pink Friday: Roman Reloaded	Nicki Minaj	Pink Friday: Roman Reloaded	Nicki Minaj	
June 16	Pink Friday: Roman Reloaded	Nicki Minaj	Pink Friday: Roman Reloaded	Nicki Minaj	
June 23	Live from the Underground	Big K.R.I.T.	Live from the Underground	Big K.R.I.T.	
June 30	Looking 4 Myself	Usher	Triple F Life: Friends, Fans & Family	Waka Flocka Flame	
July 7	Looking 4 Myself	Usher	Let It Shine	Soundtrack / Various artists	
July 14	Self Made Vol. 2	Maybach Music Group	Self Made Vol. 2	Maybach Music Group	
July 21	Fortune	Chris Brown	Self Made Vol. 2	Maybach Music Group	
July 28	Channel Orange	Frank Ocean	Self Made Vol. 2	Maybach Music Group	
August 4	Life Is Good	Nas	Life Is Good	Nas	
August 11	Life Is Good	Nas	Life Is Good	Nas	
August 18	God Forgives, I Don't	Rick Ross	God Forgives, I Don't	Rick Ross	
August 25	God Forgives, I Don't	Rick Ross	God Forgives, I Don't	Rick Ross	
September 1	Based on a T.R.U. Story	2 Chainz	Based on a T.R.U. Story	2 Chainz	
September 8	Chapter V	Trey Songz	Based on a T.R.U. Story	2 Chainz	
September 15	Welcome to: Our House	Slaughterhouse	Welcome to: Our House	Slaughterhouse	
September 22	Based on a T.R.U. Story	2 Chainz	Gravity	Lecrae	
September 29	Based on a T.R.U. Story	2 Chainz	Based on a T.R.U. Story	2 Chainz	
October 6	Cruel Summer	GOOD Music	Cruel Summer	GOOD Music	
October 13	Food & Liquor II: The Great American Rap Album Pt. 1	Lupe Fiasco	Food & Liquor II: The Great American Rap Album Pt. 1	Lupe Fiasco	
October 20	Kaleidoscope Dream	Miguel	Cruel Summer	GOOD Music	
October 27	The Heist	Macklemore & Ryan Lewis	The Heist	Macklemore & Ryan Lewis	
November 3	Two Eleven	Brandy	The Heist	Macklemore & Ryan Lewis	
November 10	Good Kid, M.A.A.D City	Kendrick Lamar	Good Kid, M.A.A.D City	Kendrick Lamar	
November 17	Dreams and Nightmares	Meek Mill	Dreams and Nightmares	Meek Mill	
November 24	R.E.D.	Ne-Yo	Dreams and Nightmares	Meek Mill	
December 1	Trilogy	The Weeknd	Good Kid, M.A.A.D City	Kendrick Lamar	
December 8	Unapologetic	Rihanna	Global Warming	Pitbull	
December 15	Girl on Fire	Alicia Keys	Good Kid, M.A.A.D City	Kendrick Lamar	
December 22	O.N.I.F.C.	Wiz Khalifa	O.N.I.F.C.	Wiz Khalifa	
December 29	Jesus Piece	The Game	Jesus Piece	The Game	

== See also ==
- 2012 in music
- 2012 in hip hop music
- List of number-one R&B/hip-hop songs of 2012 (U.S.)
- List of Billboard 200 number-one albums of 2012
