= Tony Montana (disambiguation) =

Tony Montana is a fictional character, the main protagonist of the 1983 film Scarface

Tony Montana may also refer to:

- Tony Montana, bass player in the band Great White
- "Tony Montana" (song), on rapper Future's 2012 album Pluto
- "Tony Montana", song on rapper Agust D's 2016 mixtape Agust D
- Tony Reflex (born 1963), American punk rock singer also known as Tony Montana

== See also ==
- Toni Montano (1962–2024), Serbian rock singer-songwriter
