= I'm Different (2 Chainz song) =

2012 single by 2 Chainz

Single by 2 Chainz

from the album Based on a T.R.U. Story
- Released: November 8, 2012
- Recorded: 2012
- Genre: Hip-hop; hardcore hip-hop
- Length: 3:26
- Label: Def Jam
- Songwriters: Tauheed Epps; Dijon McFarlene
- Producers: DJ Mustard; Mike Free

2 Chainz singles chronology
| "Fuckin' Problems" (2012) | "I'm Different" (2012) | "Leggo" (2012) |

Music video
- "I'm Different" on YouTube

"I'm Different" is a song by American rapper 2 Chainz, released November 8, 2012 as the third single from his debut studio album Based on a T.R.U. Story (2012). The song was produced by DJ Mustard.

== Background ==
On November 8, 2012, 2 Chainz announced his third official single from the album as "I'm Different" also releasing the single cover art which pays homage to his home state of Georgia and that he would be filming the music video soon. The song is featured along with 2 Chainz in a commercial for Champs Sports and Adidas.

== Music video ==
The music video was directed by Elisha Smith and premiered December 23, 2012 on MTV Jams. While talking about the music video in an interview with MTV, 2 Chainz said: "I wrote the treatment for that and I’m really excited to continue pushing the envelope and giving the fans something to see, some excitement again, really building that curiosity up with hip-hop again — I’m happy to be one of the frontrunners for that campaign." Regarding the fashion 2 Chainz wears during the video, the media mostly discussed his black, yellow and white coloured Adidas tracksuit.

== Live performances ==
On October 9, 2012, 2 Chainz performed the song along with "Birthday Song" at the 2012 BET Hip Hop Awards. He also performed the song along with "Birthday Song" on Jimmy Kimmel Live.

== Charts ==
=== Weekly charts ===
| Chart (2012–2013) | Peak position |
|---|---|
| US Billboard Hot 100 | 27 |
| US Hot R&B/Hip-Hop Songs (Billboard) | 6 |
| US Rhythmic Airplay (Billboard) | 12 |

=== Year-end charts ===
| Chart (2013) | Position |
|---|---|
| US Billboard Hot 100 | 99 |
| US Hot R&B/Hip-Hop Songs (Billboard) | 27 |
| US Rhythmic (Billboard) | 47 |

== Certifications ==
| Region | Certification | Certified units/sales |
|---|---|---|
| United States (RIAA) | 3× Platinum | 3,000,000^{‡} |
^{‡} Sales+streaming figures based on certification alone.

== Release history ==
| Country | Date | Format | Label |
|---|---|---|---|
| United States | November 8, 2012 | Digital download, Urban radio & Rhythmic radio | Def Jam |
