= My Life Is Going On =

- The cover of the remix version of Gavin Moss

Single by Cecilia Krull

from the album La Casa de Papel / Money Heist – The Soundtrack
- Released: June 10, 2017
- Genre: Dance
- Length: 3:35 (original version); 3:50 (Burak Yeter remix)
- Label: Atresmúsica
- Songwriter(s): Manel Santisteban; Cecilia Krull

"My Life Is Going On" is a song performed by Cecilia Krull. The song is the theme song of the Netflix Spanish TV series Money Heist (known in Spanish as La Casa de Papel), included on the album La Casa de Papel / Money Heist – The Soundtrack.

== Background ==
As of June 2020, the song's music video has over 82 million views on YouTube. It is widely known as the theme song of the series Money Heist, which became one of Netflix's biggest successes in 2018.

== Remixes ==
The theme song of one of the most successful Netflix TV series, and for example with the remixes of the Turkish Burak Yeter the song has climbed the international charts.

=== Burak Yeter version ===
Turkish DJ Burak Yeter made a remix of the song, which quickly became the most well-known version of the song internationally. As of April 29, 2020, the video has more than 41 million views on YouTube.

=== Gavin Moss version ===
The song was released on the French market with its remix version of Gavin Moss.

=== Tyler ICU and Nicole Elocin version ===
The Amapiano version from the South African record producer, Tyler ICU and the female singer-songwriter, Nicole Elocin is mostly recognized within the country. It was released on 4 September 2020; 4 years ago from the EP "Money Heist" by both Tyler ICU & Nicole Elocin through the New Money Gang, a record label founded by DJ Maphorisa

== Official videos ==
=== Cecilia Krull original version ===
The video was distributed on 14 November 2017, it is built from clips from the first season of the TV series Money Heist.

=== Gavin Moss remix ===
The video was distributed on 11 May 2018 and is uniquely made up of an image of a red sweatshirt with the names of the performers (Gavin Moss and Cecilia Krull) and the title of the song overwritten.

=== Burak Yeter remix ===
The video was distributed on 21 June 2018. The video alternates images of the DJ set of Turkish disc jockey Burak Yeter, with images of the 1969 Apollo 11 Moon landing. The feature by Cecilia Krull is highlighted by the text of the sung part superimposed.

== Chart ==
=== Cecilia Krull original version ===
==== Weekly charts ====
Chart (2018–2019)	Peak position
Belgium (Ultratip Bubbling Under Wallonia)	16
Brazil (Top 100 Brasil)	12
France (SNEP)	29
Greece (International Airplay)	1
Greece (Greek Airplay)	1
Hungary (Single Top 40)	7

Chart (2020)	Peak position
Greece (Greek Airplay)	17

==== Year-end charts ====
Chart (2021)	Position
Hungary (Single Top 40)	84

=== Gavin Moss remix ===
Chart (2018)	Peak position
France (SNEP)	39
Spain Radio (PROMUSICAE)	40

=== Burak Yeter remix ===
==== Weekly charts ====
Chart (2018–2019)	Peak position
Hungary (Dance Top 40)	3
Hungary (Rádiós Top 40)	4
Hungary (Single Top 40)	7
Italy (FIMI)	8
Italy Airplay (EarOne)	1
Poland (Polish Airplay Top 100)	5
Poland (Dance Top 50)	22

==== Year-end charts ====
Chart (2019)	Position
Hungary (Dance Top 40)	14
Hungary (Rádiós Top 40)	28
Hungary (Single Top 40)	43

Chart (2020)	Position
Hungary (Dance Top 40)	55

== Certifications ==
Region	Certification	Certified units/sales
France (SNEP)	Gold	100,000^{‡}
Italy (FIMI)	2× Platinum	100,000^{‡}
Poland (ZPAV)	Platinum	20,000^{‡}
^{‡} Sales+streaming figures based on certification alone.
