= Burak Yeter =

Turkish musician (born 1982)

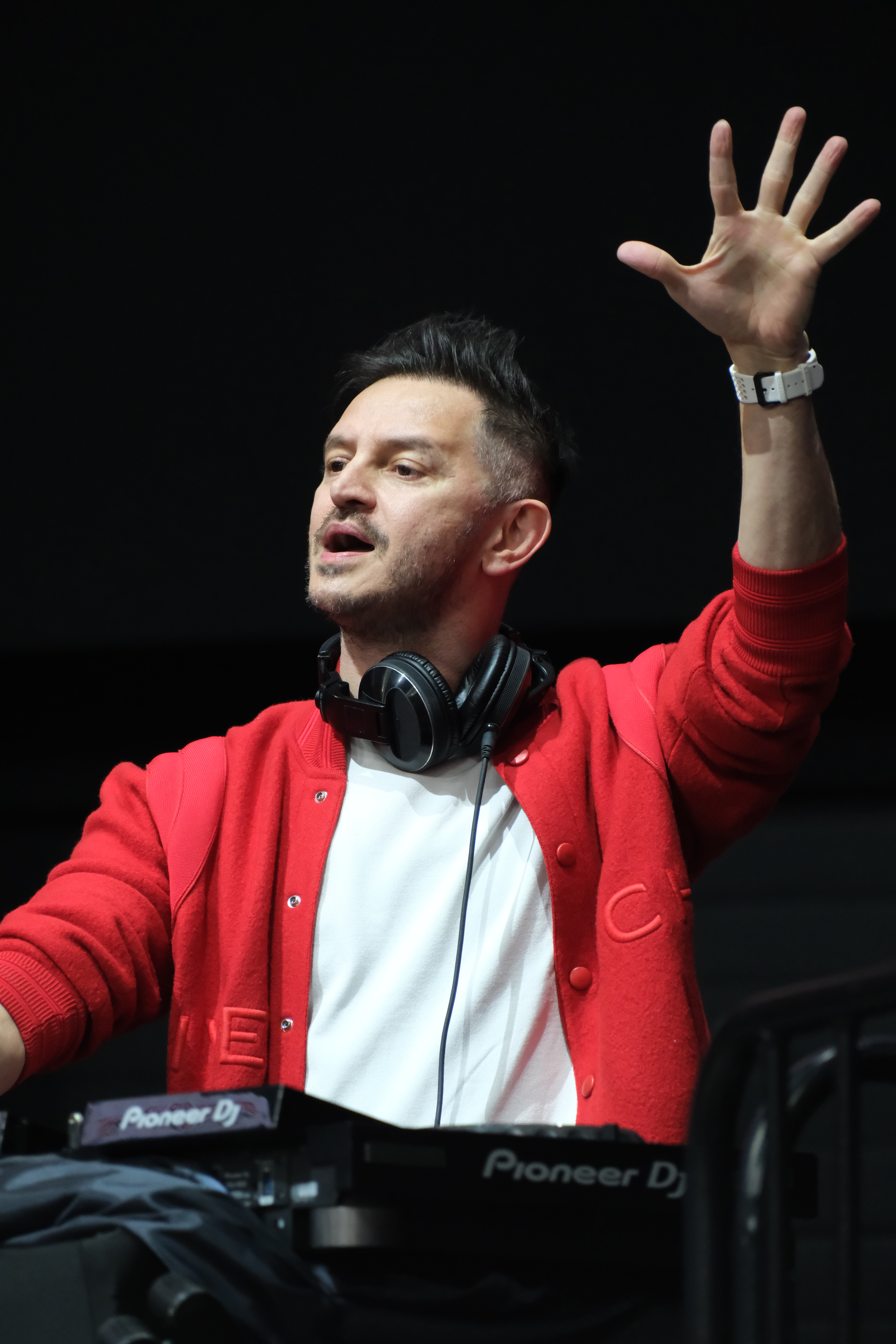
- Yeter performing during a Turkey men's national basketball team game in 2025

Background information
- Born: 5 May 1982 (age 44); Trabzon, Turkey
- Genre: Electronica
- Occupations: DJ; record producer; remixer
- Instruments: Piano; keyboards; mixer; synthesizer; Logic Studio
- Years active: 2000–present
- Labels: Spinnin'; Armada; Connection; Universal; Warner; Sony
- Website: burakyeter.com

Burak Yeter (born 5 May 1982) is a Turkish DJ, record producer and remixer.

== Early life ==
By age eight Yeter picked up playing the guitar. After receiving his undergraduate education in Civil Engineering in Akdeniz University, Yeter settled in London and earned his master's degree in Sound Engineering from SAE Institute.

== Musical career ==
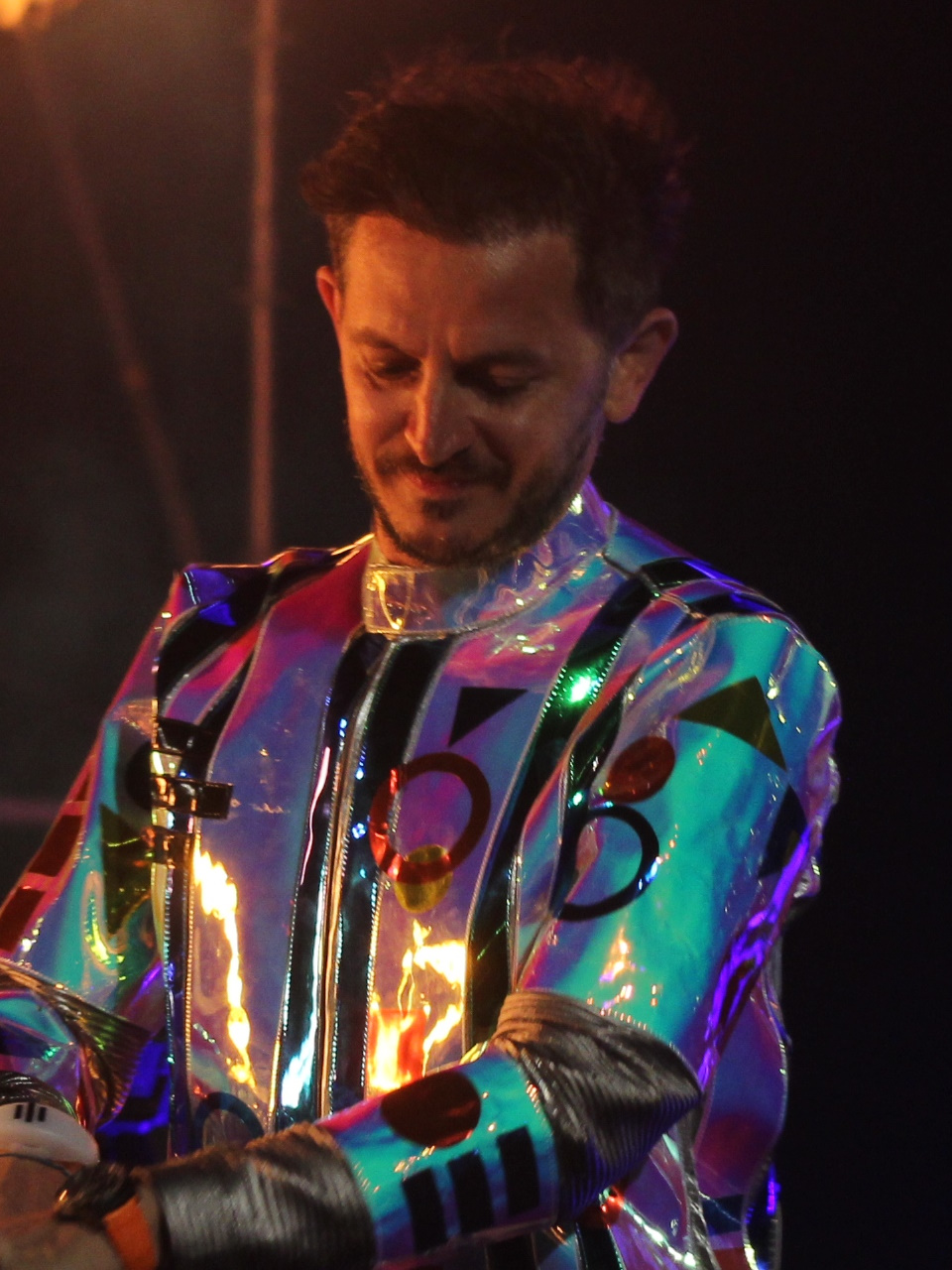
Yeter performing in Akdeniz University (October 2023)

At the age of 22, Yeter came into recognition by performing at the MTV Dance Floor Chart Party in Malta. The same year, he finished in second place at the Miller Master DJ Competition.

Yeter's debut album, For Action, was released under the record label DSM in 2005. The album is his first solo DJ album to be released worldwide. His second album, For Message Volume 2 released in 2007 was in support of raising awareness of global warming. Burak Yeter is also the CEO of Connection Records.

In 2013, he released the single "Storm" in Amsterdam. The song reached within the Top 100 spots on the dance charts Internationally. At the same time, he shot a music video for the song "Storm" in the Netherlands.

After ten years, Yeter started a new page in his career with his "New World" project; "new songs with a new world". He released his first single "Happy" on Spinnin' Records, where the track was voted best song of the week in the Spinnin' Talent Pool. Follow-up single "Tuesday" was a bigger success, reaching the #1 slot on a number of charts globally and was the 10th most Shazam'd song worldwide in 2017. The following year, Yeter scored another hit via his "My Life Is Going On", which was a Top 10 hit in Italy, Hungary, and Poland. In 2020, Yeter made DJ Mag's Top 100 DJ list, coming in at #82 in his debut on the list.

Yeter is currently working on upcoming projects in his studio in Amsterdam.

== Discography ==
=== Studio albums ===
Title	Details
For Action Volume 1	Released: 2005; Label: DSM; Format: CD
For Message Volume 2	Released: 2007; Label: DSM; Format: CD
Blue	Released: 26 June 2012; Label: DSM; Format: Digital download, CD

=== Singles ===
Title	Year	Peak chart positions										Certifications
Title	Year	AUT	BEL	DEN	FIN	FRA	GER	HUN	ITA	POL	SWI	Certifications
"Kingdom Falls"	2015	—	—	—	—	—	—	—	—	—	—	
"Reckless" (featuring Delaney Jane)	2016	—	—	—	—	—	—	—	—	—	—	
"Happy"	2016	—	—	—	—	—	—	—	—	—	—	
"Tuesday" (featuring Danelle Sandoval)	2016	2	13	10	4	6	2	1	91	3	4	BEA: Platinum; BVMI: 2× Platinum; FIMI: Platinum; IFPI AUT: Platinum; IFPI DEN: Platinum; IFPI SWI: Platinum; SNEP: Diamond; ZPAV: 3× Platinum
"Go"	2016	—	—	—	—	—	—	—	—	—	—	
"GO 2.0" (Burak Yeter x Ryan Riback)	2017	—	92	—	—	—	—	—	—	—	—	
"Echo"	2017	—	99	—	—	—	—	—	—	—	—	
"Crash"	2018	—	—	—	—	—	—	—	—	—	—	
"My Life Is Going On" (with Cecilia Krull)	2018	—	66	—	—	29	—	3	8	5	—	FIMI: 2× Platinum; SNEP: Gold; ZPAV: Platinum
"Friday Night"	2019	—	—	—	—	—	—	40	—	—	—	FIMI: Gold
"Body Talks"	2020	—	—	—	—	—	—	—	—	—	—	
"—" denotes a recording that did not chart or was not released in that territory.

=== Remixes ===
- 2017 Alan Walker – "Sing Me to Sleep" (Burak Yeter Remix)
- 2017 Anne-Marie – "Ciao Adios" (Burak Yeter Remix)
- 2017 Reyko – "Spinning over You" (Burak Yeter Remix)
- 2017 Filatov & Karas feat. Rada – "Lirika" (Burak Yeter Remix)
- 2018 Cecilia Krull "My Life Is Going On" (Burak Yeter Remix)

== Awards for music sales ==
Gold Record

- Belgium
  - 2017: Single "Tuesday"
- Denmark
  - 2017: Single "Tuesday"
- Italy
  - 2017: Single "Tuesday"
- Poland
  - 2017: Single "Tuesday"
  - 2018: Single "My Life Is Going On"
  - 2020: Single "Fly Away"
  - 2020: Single "Just Miss Love"

Platinum record

- France
  - 2017: Single "Tuesday"

Country	Gold	Platinum	Website
Belgium	10	12	ultratop.be
Denmark	10	12	ifpi.dk
Germany	12	10	musikindustrie.de
France	13	12	snepmusique.com
Italy	12	12	fimi.it
Austria	12	13	ifpi.at
Poland	12	12	bestsellery.zpav.pl
Switzerland	13	12	hitparade.ch
Finland	12	12	warnermusicfi
Total	93	107	

== Awards and nominations ==
Year	Award	Category	Nominated work	Result		
2021	DJ MAG TOP 100 Burak Yeter	Won				
2020	DJ MAG TOP 100 Burak Yeter	Won	Won			
2012	Kral TV Music Awards	Won	Won	Best Remixer	Haberin Olsun by Bengü	Nominated
2011	Kral TV Music Awards	Won	Won	Best Remixer	Arada Sırada by Ajda Pekkan	Won
2010	Kral TV Music Awards	Won	Won	Best Remixer	Oyalama Beni by Ajda Pekkan	Won
2006	Malta Shakedown DJ Contest	Won	Won	Best Electronic Artist or DJ	Burak Yeter	Won
2005	Miller Master DJ Contest	Won	Won	Best Electronic Artist or DJ	Burak Yeter	Won
2004	MTV and Burn DJ Contest	Won	Won	Best Electronic Artist or DJ	Burak Yeter	Won
