= Based on a T.R.U. Story =

Studio album by 2 Chainz
- Released: August 14, 2012
- Recorded: 2011–12
- Genres: Hip-hop; trap
- Length: 54:21
- Labels: The Real University; Def Jam
- Producers: Streetrunner; Matthew Burnett; Southside; Mr. Bangladesh; Mike Will Made It; Marz; Cameron Cartee; Sonny Digital; Kanye West; BWheezy; Anthony Kilhoffer; Lifted; Mike Dean; DJ Mustard; The-Dream; YoungStarr Beatz; Kenoe; Got Koke; Drumma Boy; Mike Posner; Lil' Ronnie; Carlos Broady; AC Burrell; G'harah "PK" Degeddingseze; Million $ Mano; Don Cannon; DJ Spinz

2 Chainz chronology
T.R.U. REALigion (2011)	Based on a T.R.U. Story (2012)	B.O.A.T.S. II: Me Time (2013)

Singles from Based on a T.R.U. Story
- 1. "No Lie" Released: May 8, 2012; 2. "Birthday Song" Released: July 24, 2012; 3. "I'm Different" Released: November 8, 2012

Based on a T.R.U. Story is the debut studio album by American rapper 2 Chainz. It was released on August 14, 2012, by Def Jam Recordings. The album features guest appearances from fellow rappers Lil Wayne, Kanye West, Drake, Nicki Minaj and Playaz Circle cohort Dolla Boy, along with singer-songwriters The-Dream, Mike Posner and Chris Brown. The album's production was handled by Brick Squad Monopoly's Southside, Mike Will Made It, Sonny Digital, Kanye West, Hit-Boy, Drumma Boy, DJ Mustard, Mr. Bangladesh and DJ Spinz, among others.

The album was nominated for Best Rap Album at the 55th Grammy Awards, but lost to Take Care by Drake. The album was officially certified platinum on March 22, 2016.

== Background ==
In 2007, 2 Chainz began releasing solo material, while he still was in the group Playaz Circle with Dolla Boy. During the year, he released a mixtape titled Me Against the World!, while he still was under his former stage name Tity Boi. In 2011, he changed his moniker to 2 Chainz, as he perceived it to be more "family friendly", before his career began to take off. Following his name change, 2 Chainz released a mixtape titled T.R.U. REALigion (2011), which became his first solo full-length project to appear on a music chart, peaking at number 58 on the US Billboard Top R&B/Hip-Hop Albums chart. He has also made guest appearances on songs by recording artists since the name change, including the singles "Mercy" by Kanye West and "Beez in the Trap" by Nicki Minaj.

The album was originally set to be titled T.R.U. 2 My REALigion, as he revealed to AllHipHop at his sold-out show in New York City's live music venue SOB's, on January 30, 2012. On March 15, 2012, it was revealed, while in Austin, Texas for SXSW, 2 Chainz announced his Def Jam debut, which would no longer be titled T.R.U. 2 My REALigion. Instead, during an interview with FUSE, the former member of Playaz Circle announced a new title for his LP: "I recently changed the album and the new title of my album is Based on a T.R.U. Story."

== Release and promotion ==
On March 24, 2 Chainz announced, via his Twitter feed, the album would be released on August 14, 2012. On July 17, 2012, the album's deluxe edition cover art was unveiled. Designed by Kanye West's creative agency DONDA, the album cover was ranked the second best of 2012 by Complex Magazine. On July 24, 2 Chainz announced he would embark on a tour following the album's release, which would begin August 30 in Norfolk, Virginia at The Norva and concludes on September 27 in Austin, Texas at La Zona Rosa. On February 12, 2013, the album's chopnotslop version by OG Ron C was released on iTunes.

=== Singles ===
The album's lead single, "No Lie" premiered on May 1, 2012, and was released to iTunes on May 8, 2012. The song features guest vocals from Canadian recording artist Drake, while it was produced by Mike WiLL Made It. It was sent to urban radio on May 15, 2012. The music video (directed by Director X) was released June 21, 2012.

The album's second single, "Birthday Song" featuring Kanye West, was released on July 24, 2012. It officially impacted urban radio on August 7, 2012.

The album's third single, "I'm Different" was released on November 8, 2012. The music video for "I'm Different" premiered December 23, 2012 on MTV Jams.

=== Other songs ===
On August 12, 2012, the music video for "I Luv Dem Strippers" featuring Nicki Minaj, was released. On March 17, 2013, the music video for "Crack" was released. On April 15, 2013, the music video for "Yuck!" featuring Lil Wayne, was released. On April 24, 2013, the music video for "Like Me" was released.

== Critical reception ==
Professional ratings
Review scores
Source	Rating
AllMusic	3.5/5 stars
HipHopDX	3/5 stars
Los Angeles Times	1/4 stars
Pitchfork	4.5/10
RapReviews	2.5/10
Rolling Stone	3.5/5 stars

Based on a T.R.U. Story received mixed reviews from music critics. At Metacritic, which assigns a weighted mean rating out of 100 to reviews from mainstream critics, the album received an average score of 55, based on 19 reviews, which indicates "mixed or average reviews". David Jeffries of AllMusic praised the high-powered production on the lead track "Yuck" and felt that overall 2 Chainz "almost delivers on his official debut." Jody Rosen of Rolling Stone felt 2 Chainz has "irrepressible enthusiasm" and also praised the guest artists and producers.

Phillip Mlynar of HipHopDX affirmed 2 Chainz' enthusiasm but disliked his lyrics, stating "throughout the album, Chainz kicks a series of amazingly flimsy rhymes" and concluded "2 Chainz has revealed himself as the weakest guest on his own album." In a very negative review, Jesal Padania of RapReviews.com panned 2 Chainz' lyrics with the lowest possible score 1 out of 10 points, commenting "Can 2 Chainz rap? Yes, of course. But is he saying anything? No, not even once... Albums like Based On a T.R.U. Story really make you wonder just how they even come about to existence." Los Angeles Times reviewer Randall Roberts also disliked Chainz' lyrics, and while he praised the guest verses on the album, he felt that "2 Chainz drags them down." In a lengthy review, Pitchfork's David Drake felt the album offers "nothing beyond the one-dimensional caricature [2 Chainz]'s crafted on countless other verses" and called it "a cynical example of the bare minimum of creativity required for that level of success."

The track Dope Peddler samples Tom Lehrer's song "The Old Dope Peddler". In 2013, Lehrer said he was "very proud" to have his song sampled "literally sixty years after I recorded it". Lehrer went on to describe his official response to the request to use his song: "As sole copyright owner of 'The Old Dope Peddler', I grant you motherfuckers permission to do this. Please give my regards to Mr. Chainz, or may I call him 2?"

=== Accolades ===
Despite being met with mixed reviews from critics, Based on a T.R.U. Story was nominated for Best Rap Album at the 55th Grammy Awards. The album was named the 25th best Hip Hop album of 2012 by Spin.

== Commercial performance ==
Based on a T.R.U. Story debuted at number one on the US Billboard 200, selling 147,000 copies in its first week. As of August 2013, the album sold 623,000 copies in the United States. On March 30, 2016, the album was certified platinum by the Recording Industry Association of America (RIAA) for combined sales and album-equivalent units of over a million units in the United States.

== Track listing ==
Based on a T.R.U. Story track listing
No.	Title	Writer(s)	Producer(s)	Length
1.	"Yuck!" (featuring Lil Wayne)	Tauheed Epps; Dwayne Carter Jr.; Nicholas Warwar; Matthew Burnett	Streetrunner; Burnett	4:47
2.	"Crack"	Epps; Joshua Luellen	Southside	4:32
3.	"Dope Peddler"	Epps; Shondrae Crawford; Tom Lehrer	Bangladesh	3:28
4.	"No Lie" (featuring Drake)	Epps; Aubrey Graham; Noah Shebib; Michael Williams II; Marquel Middlebrooks	Mike Will Made It; Marz^{[a]}; 40^{[c]}	3:57
5.	"Birthday Song" (featuring Kanye West)	Epps; Kanye West; Sonny Uwaezuoke; Brandon Whitfield	Sonny Digital; West^{[a]}; BWheezy^{[a]}; Anthony Kilhoffer^{[b]}; Lifted^{[b]}; Mike Dean^{[b]}	5:06
6.	"I'm Different"	Epps; Dijon McFarlane	DJ Mustard; Mike Free^{[a]}	3:27
7.	"Extremely Blessed" (featuring The-Dream)	Epps; Terius Nash	The-Dream	4:05
8.	"I Luv Dem Strippers" (featuring Nicki Minaj)	Epps; Onika Maraj; Brandon Henshaw; Rico Brooks; Travis McFetridge; Ray Parker Jr.	YoungStarr Beatz	3:59
9.	"Stop Me Now" (featuring Dolla Boy)	Epps; Earl Coyners; Maurice Jordan; Matthew Furdge; Tony Hester	Kenoe; Got Koke	4:37
10.	"Money Machine"	Epps; Christopher Gholson	Drumma Boy	4:43
11.	"In Town" (featuring Mike Posner)	Epps; Michael Posner; Ronnie Jackson	Mike Posner; Lil' Ronnie	3:26
12.	"Ghetto Dreams" (featuring Scarface & John Legend)	Epps; Brad Jordan; Carlos Broady; William Guice; James Walker; Kenneth Lewis; John Stephens	Broady	3:43
13.	"Wut We Doin?" (featuring Cap.1)	Epps; Leon Smith; Williams II; Middlebrooks	Mike Will Made It; Marz^{[a]}	4:25
Total length:				54:21

Deluxe edition (bonus tracks)
No.	Title	Writer(s)	Producer(s)	Length
14.	"Countdown" (featuring Chris Brown)	Epps; Anthony Burrell; G'harah Degeddingseze; Christopher Brown	AC Burrell; PK	3:51
15.	"Like Me"	Epps; Emmanuel Nickerson; Martin McKinney; Carlo Montagnese; Abel Tesfaye	Mano	3:49
16.	"I Feel Good"	Epps; Donald Cannon; Marcene Harris	Don Cannon	2:21
17.	"Riot"	Epps; Gary Hill	DJ Spinz	2:47
Total length:				67:12

Notes

- ^{^[a]} signifies a co-producer
- ^{^[b]} signifies an additional producer
- ^{^[c]} signifies a vocal producer

Samples credits

- "Yuck!" contains a sample of "Down for My Niggaz", performed by C-Murder.
- "Dope Peddler" contains a sample of "The Old Dope Peddler", performed by Tom Lehrer.
- "I Luv Dem Strippers" contains a sample of "Mr. Telephone Man", performed by New Edition.
- "Stop Me Now" contains a sample of "Nothing Can Stop Me", performed by Cissy Houston.
- "Like Me" contains a sample of "The Birds Part 1", performed by The Weeknd.

== Charts ==
=== Weekly charts ===
Weekly chart performance for Based on a T.R.U. Story
Chart (2012)	Peak position
Belgian Albums (Ultratop Wallonia)	132
Canadian Albums (Billboard)	7
French Albums (SNEP)	180
UK R&B Albums	31
US Billboard 200	1
US Top R&B/Hip-Hop Albums (Billboard)	1
US Top Rap Albums (Billboard)	1

=== Year-end charts ===
2012 year-end chart performance for Based on a T.R.U. Story
Chart (2012)	Position
US Billboard 200	72
US Top R&B/Hip-Hop Albums (Billboard)	11

2013 year-end chart performance for Based on a T.R.U. Story
Chart (2013)	Position
US Billboard 200	108
US Top R&B/Hip-Hop Albums (Billboard)	21
US Top Rap Albums (Billboard)	14

== Certifications ==
Certifications for Based on a T.R.U. Story
Region	Certification	Certified units/sales
United States (RIAA)	Platinum	1,000,000^{‡}
^{‡} Sales+streaming figures based on certification alone.

== See also ==
- List of number-one albums of 2012 (U.S.)
- List of number-one R&B albums of 2012 (U.S.)
- List of number-one rap albums of 2012 (U.S.)
