= Astronaut Status =

Mixtape by Future
- Released: January 12, 2012
- Recorded: 2011
- Genre: Trap
- Length: 62:21
- Label: A1 Recordings; Freebandz
- Producer: Zaytoven; Sonny Digital; K.E. on the Track; Mike WiLL Made It; DJ Esco

Future chronology
Streetz Calling (2011)	Astronaut Status (2012)	Pluto (2012)

Astronaut Status is the ninth mixtape by American rapper Future. It was released on January 12, 2012. The album features guest appearances from rappers Gucci Mane, Young Jeezy, Ludacris and Rocko. Future previously stated Streetz Calling would be his last mixtape, before his debut full-length album Pluto, but instead released Astronaut Status in 2012, making it his last official mixtape. "Itchin'" peaked at #2 on the Bubbling Under R&B/Hip-Hop Songs chart. Since the release of Astronaut Status, it has been downloaded over 250k times on DatPiff, certifying it platinum. Astronaut Status also charted at #50 on the Billboard Heatseekers Chart.

== Critical reception ==
Pitchfork's Jordan Sargent called Astronaut Status "Future's strongest, most listenable mixtape yet ... [though] in the murky waters of pop-rap hitmaking, it's hard to tell if anything on Astronaut Status stands up to the songs that helped Future ascend to this status in the first place." Adam Fleischer of XXL wrote that "Future often relies on his materialistic musings to carry Astronaut Status", and his attempts to stray from that formula are inconsistent. Fleischer added: "It's apparent that Future knows the components of a catchy street chant, it's just a matter of whether or not he can deliver every time." The mixtape ranked 13th on Stereogum's list of the top 40 rap albums of 2012. Tom Breihan said the mixtape contains "some of rap's catchiest mantras of the year."

== Track listing ==
No.	Title	Writer(s)	Producer(s)	Length
1.	"Abu Intro (Turn Up)"		DJ X-Rated	0:33
2.	"Future Back"	Nayvadius Wilburn; Willie Byrd	Will-A-Fool	2:29
3.	"Space Cadets"	Wilburn; Xavier Dotson	Zaytoven	2:49
4.	"Birds Take a Bath" (featuring Young Jeezy and Young Scooter)	Wilburn; Jay Jenkins; Kenneth Bailey; Byrd	Will-A-Fool	4:25
5.	"Nunbout" (featuring Cooley)	Wilburn; Dotson	Zaytoven	4:21
6.	"Swap It Out"	Wilburn; Kenneth Smith Jr.	DJ Plugg	3:02
7.	"Jordan Diddy (Interlude)"	Wilburn	Future	0:19
8.	"Jordan Diddy" (featuring Gucci Mane)	Wilburn; Radric Davis; Sonny Uwaezuoke	Sonny Digital	4:00
9.	"Blow" (featuring Ludacris and Rocko)		DJ Spinz	4:14
10.	"Deeper Than the Ocean"		Will-A-Fool	3:37
11.	"My Ho 2"		K.E. on the Track	3:33
12.	"Best 2 Shine"		DJ Plugg	4:04
13.	"Never Seen These (Skit)"		Future	0:25
14.	"Never Seen These"		Will-A-Fool	2:54
15.	"Shopping Spree"		K.E. on the Track	2:58
16.	"Transform"		Zaytoven	3:36
17.	"Rider" (featuring Tasha Catour)		Looney Tunez	3:55
18.	"Spaz on Y'all"		Jon Boy	4:03
19.	"Abu Outro (Astronaut Status)"		Future	0:28
20.	"Itchin'" (Bonus track)		Mike WiLL Made-It	2:39
21.	"No Matter What" (Bonus track)		K.E. on the Track	3:47
Total length:				62:21
