= Pluto (album) =

Studio album by Future
- Released: April 13, 2012
- Studios: 11th Street (Atlanta); Boom Boom Room (Burbank); DBrady Investments (Memphis)
- Genre: Hip-hop
- Length: 56:44
- Labels: Freebandz; A1; Epic
- Producers: Honorable C.N.O.T.E.; John Blu; Jon Boi; Juicy J; K.E. on the Track; Mike Will Made It; Nard & B; Organized Noize; Sonny Digital; Will-A-Fool

Future chronology
| Astronaut Status (2012) | Pluto (2012) | Pluto 3D (2012) |

Singles from Pluto
- 1. "Tony Montana" Released: April 16, 2011; 2. "Go Harder" Released: November 29, 2011; 3. "Magic (Remix)" Released: January 23, 2012; 4. "Same Damn Time" Released: March 24, 2012; 5. "Turn On the Lights" Released: April 13, 2012

Pluto is the debut studio album by American rapper Future. It was released in Europe on April 13, 2012, and in the US on April 17, 2012, through A1 Recordings and Freebandz, and distributed by Epic Records. The album features guest appearances from Drake, R. Kelly, T.I., Trae tha Truth and Snoop Dogg, with the production, which was handled by Will-A-Fool, Sonny Digital and K.E. on the Track, among others.

Pluto was supported by five singles: "Tony Montana", "Go Harder", "Magic (Remix)", "Same Damn Time" and "Turn On the Lights". The album received generally positive reviews from critics, debuting at number eight on the US Billboard 200, selling 41,000 copies in its first week. It was reissued with an alternate track list in 2012 as Pluto 3D.

== Promotion ==
The lead single from the album, "Tony Montana", was released on April 16, 2011. The record version of the song, which features a guest appearance from Canadian rapper Drake, was released on July 6, 2011. The music video for "Tony Montana" was released on October 27, 2011. The song peaked at number four on the US Bubbling Under Hot 100 Singles.

"Go Harder" was released digitally as the album's second single on November 29, 2011, and impacted rhythmic contemporary radio on January 10, 2012.

"Magic (Remix)" featuring T.I., was released as the album's third single on January 23, 2012. The music video for "Magic (Remix)" was released on January 31, 2012. The song peaked at number 69 on the US Billboard Hot 100.

The album's fourth single, "Same Damn Time", was released on March 24, 2012. The music video was released on April 6, 2012. The remix to "Same Damn Time", which features guest appearances from Diddy and Ludacris, was released on May 16, 2012. The music video for "Same Damn Time (Remix)" was released on July 22, 2012. The song peaked at number 92 on the Billboard Hot 100.

The album's fifth single, "Turn On the Lights", was released on April 13, 2012. The song peaked at number 50 on the Billboard Hot 100, making it the album's most successful single to date. In 2012, it was announced that Future scored the number one spot on the Mediabase Urban Mainstream chart for his Mike Will-produced single, "Turn On the Lights". It became his most successful song on the latter three charts, and his most successful single as a lead artist. In 2012, Future released the remix to "Turn On the Lights" featuring Lil Wayne.

== Critical reception ==
Professional ratings
Aggregate scores
| Source | Rating |
|---|---|
| Metacritic | 68/100 |
Review scores
| Source | Rating |
| AllMusic | 3.5/5 stars |
| The A.V. Club | C+ |
| Fact | 2.5/5 |
| HipHopDX | 2.0/5 |
| MSN Music (Expert Witness) | (2-star Honorable Mention) |
| Now | 4/5 |
| Pitchfork | 7.8/10 |
| Spectrum Culture | 3/5 stars |
| Spin | 8/10 |
| XXL | 3/5 |

Pluto was met with generally positive reviews. At Metacritic, which assigns a normalized rating out of 100 to reviews from mainstream publications, the album received an average score of 68, based on 10 reviews.

David Jeffries of AllMusic called it "fat and redundant at 15 tracks, but it delivers whenever you desire that purple and woozy, Cudi-meets-Khalifa flavor", and wrote that "Future comes off as a memorable name in spite of his narrow style". Pitchfork's Jordan Sargent wrote that, "though it will sound instantly recognizable, his personality, voice, and skewed take on pop-rap make it instantly different". Andrew Nosnitsky of Spin called its songs "so well-defined" with "more advanced experiments" than Future's previous mixtapes and stated, "The more adventurous listener might wonder what he could accomplish if he broke free of his genre's gravitational pull entirely".

In a mixed review, Alex Macpherson of Fact found the album too conventional, calling it "template rap", and stated, "Both Future's drugged-out vocal style and the chintzy production, so arresting in isolation, become wearying". Evan Rytlewski of The A.V. Club called Pluto a "sporadically engrossing, frequently frustrating curiosity" and commented that it "is a more compelling listen than an album with so many atrocious lyrical turns has any right to be". In his consumer guide, critic Robert Christgau gave the album a two-star honorable mention, he cited "Turn On the Lights" and "Permanent Scar" as highlights and quipped, "The truth is, his Auto-Tuned flow has more future in it than his intermittently interplanetary rhymes". Joshua Errett of Now said, "Pluto nicely refreshes current rap trends and offers some genuinely forward-thinking hooks". Calvin Stovall of XXL said, "Pluto may be far from the sun, but Future shines brightest when he aligns with the stars".

=== Rankings ===
Chris Richards of The Washington Post placed the album at number four on his list of the top-10 albums of 2012. The New York Times' Jon Caramanica included the album in his top-10 albums list, ranking it at number nine. Jody Rosen of Slate placed the album at number one on his top-20 albums list for 2012. Spin ranked the album number 11 on its list of 50 Best Albums of 2012. The album was listed 34th on Stereogum's list of top 50 albums of 2012 and subsequently listed 100th on their list of top 100 albums of the 2010s. Consequence ranked the album number 36 on its list of top-50 albums of the year. Pitchfork placed the album at number 37 on its list of 50 Best Albums of 2012.

== Commercial performance ==
Pluto debuted at number eight on the US Billboard 200, with first-week sales of 41,000 copies. As of December 2012, the album had sold 217,000 copies in the United States. In 2022, the album was certified platinum by the Recording Industry Association of America (RIAA) for combined sales and album-equivalent units of 1,000,000 units in the United States.

== Track listing ==
Pluto track listing
| No. | Title | Writer(s) | Producer(s) | Length |
|---|---|---|---|---|
| 1. | "The Future Is Now" (featuring Big Rube) | Nayvadius Wilburn; Ruben Bailey; Michael Patterson | Organized Noize | 1:04 |
| 2. | "Parachute" (featuring R. Kelly) | Wilburn; Robert Kelly; John Blu; Pharris Thomas | Blu; DJ Pharris^{[a]} | 4:09 |
| 3. | "Straight Up" | Wilburn; Brandon Rackley; James Rosser, Jr. | Nard & B | 2:58 |
| 4. | "Astronaut Chick" | Wilburn; Willie Byrd | Will-A-Fool | 4:13 |
| 5. | "Magic (Remix)" (featuring T.I.) | Wilburn; Clifford Harris, Jr.; Kevin Erondu | K.E. on the Track | 3:31 |
| 6. | "I'm Trippin" (featuring Juicy J) | Wilburn; Jordan Houston; Gary Hill | Juicy J | 4:41 |
| 7. | "Truth Gonna Hurt You" | Wilburn; Michael Williams; Asheton Hogan | Mike Will Made It; A+^{[a]} | 3:38 |
| 8. | "Neva End" | Wilburn; Williams; Pierre Slaugher | Mike Will Made It; P-Nasty^{[a]} | 4:22 |
| 9. | "Tony Montana" (featuring Drake) | Wilburn; Aubrey Graham; Byrd; Rodney Hill, Jr. | Will-A-Fool | 4:08 |
| 10. | "Permanent Scar" | Wilburn; Jon-Sosef Miller; R. Hill | Jon Boi | 4:05 |
| 11. | "Same Damn Time" | Wilburn; Sonny Uwaezuoke | Sonny Digital | 4:33 |
| 12. | "Long Live the Pimp" (featuring Trae tha Truth) | Wilburn; Frazie Thompson; Carlton Mays, Jr. | Honorable C.N.O.T.E. | 3:28 |
| 13. | "Homicide" (featuring Snoop Dogg) | Wilburn; Calvin Broadus, Jr.; Miller; R. Hill | Jon Boi | 4:10 |
| 14. | "Turn On the Lights" | Wilburn; Williams; Marquel Middlebrooks | Mike Will Made It; Marz^{[a]} | 4:09 |
| 15. | "You Deserve It" | Wilburn; Rackley; Rosser, Jr.; G. Hill | Nard & B; DJ Spinz^{[a]} | 3:35 |
| Total length: | | | | 56:44 |

Deluxe edition (bonus tracks)
| No. | Title | Writer(s) | Producer(s) | Length |
|---|---|---|---|---|
| 16. | "Paradise" | Wilburn; Miller; R. Hill | Jon Boi | 4:05 |
| 17. | "Fishscale" | Wilburn; Byrd | Will-A-Fool | 4:25 |

iTunes bonus track
| No. | Title | Writer(s) | Producer(s) | Length |
|---|---|---|---|---|
| 16. | "Go Harder" | Wilburn; George Jackson; Rico Wade | Luney Tunez | 4:12 |

Notes

- ^{^[a]} signifies a co-producer

== Personnel ==
Credits for Pluto adapted from liner notes.

- Big Rube – spoken word, featured artist
- John Blu – producer
- Jon Boi – producer
- Will-A-Fool – producer
- Tom Coyne – mastering
- Crazy Mike – mixing
- Honorable C.N.O.T.E. – producer
- Sonny Digital – producer
- DJ Spinz – producer
- Drake – featured artist
- K.E. on the Track – producer
- Steve Fisher – engineer, mixing
- Future – primary artist, producer
- Jordan J. Sirhan – engineer
- Trehy Harris – assistant
- Jaycen Joshua – mixing
- JP Robinson – art direction
- Juicy J – featured artist, producer
- R. Kelly – featured artist
- Ross Kossman – assistant
- Mike Will Made It – producer
- Nard & B – producer
- Michael Patterson – guitar
- P-Nasty – producer
- Propane – engineer
- Will Ragland – design
- Ray Seay – mixing
- Snoop Dogg – featured artist
- Brian "B-Luv" Thomas – engineer
- Pharris Thomas – producer
- Trae tha Truth – featured artist

== Charts ==
=== Weekly charts ===
Chart performance for Pluto
| Chart (2012) | Peak position |
|---|---|
| US Billboard 200 | 8 |
| US Top R&B/Hip-Hop Albums (Billboard) | 2 |

=== Year-end charts ===
2012 year-end chart performance for Pluto
| Chart (2012) | Position |
|---|---|
| US Billboard 200 | 141 |
| US Top R&B/Hip-Hop Albums (Billboard) | 31 |

== Certifications ==
Certifications and sales for Pluto
| Region | Certification | Certified units/sales |
|---|---|---|
| United States (RIAA) | Platinum | 1,000,000^{‡} |
^{‡} Sales+streaming figures based on certification alone.

== Release history ==
Release dates and formats for Pluto
| Region | Date | Label(s) | Format(s) | Ref. |
|---|---|---|---|---|
| Germany | April 13, 2012 | A1; Freebandz; Epic | CD; digital download | |
| United Kingdom | April 13, 2012 | A1; Freebandz; Epic | CD; digital download | |
| Canada | April 17, 2012 | A1; Freebandz; Epic | CD; digital download | |
| United States | April 17, 2012 | A1; Freebandz; Epic | CD; digital download | |
