= Neva End =

Single by Future featuring Kelly Rowland

from the album Pluto and Pluto 3D
- Released: December 4, 2012
- Recorded: 2011–2012
- Studio: 11th Street Studio (Atlanta, Georgia); Chalice Recording Studios (Los Angeles, California)
- Genre: Hip hop; pop
- Length: 4:23
- Label: A1; Freebandz; Epic
- Songwriters: Kelly Rowland; Nayvadius Wilburn; Michael Williams; Pierre Ramon Slaughter; Theron Thomas; Timothy Thomas
- Producers: Mike Will Made It; P-Nasty

Future singles chronology
"We in This Bitch 1.5" (2012)	"Neva End" (2012)	"Love Me" (2013)

Kelly Rowland singles chronology
"Mama Told Me" (2012)	"Neva End" (2012)	"Kisses Down Low" (2013)

Music video
- "Neva End" on YouTube

"Neva End" is a song by American hip-hop recording artist Future from his debut studio album Pluto. The hip hop and pop song was produced by Mike Will Made It, and on December 4, 2012, it was released as the fifth official single from Pluto. The single version features an additional verse by American singer-songwriter Kelly Rowland, and was included in the 2012 re-release of Pluto, titled Pluto 3D.

== Background and release ==
"Neva End" was originally written by Nayvadius Wilburn, Michael Williams and Pierre Ramon Slaughter. It was produced by Mike Will Made It and was featured on his debut studio album Pluto. The song was officially remixed featuring a guest appearance from American singer Kelly Rowland and was released as the lead single for his re-release, Pluto 3D. Future premiered the song on October 16, 2012, and it was sent to rhythmic radio on December 4, 2012.

== Music video ==
The music video was filmed in November 2012. On November 21, 2012, the music video for "Neva End" premiered on 106 & Park. The music video was directed by Erik White, and it was shot in Los Angeles. The house the visual was shot in used to belong to American singer Madonna.

== Live performances ==
On November 27, 2012, Future performed the song along with Kelly Rowland on Jimmy Kimmel Live!.

== Chart performance ==
Neva End peaked at number 52 on US Billboard Hot 100 chart and spent a total of 20 weeks on the chart. The single also peaked at number 14 on the US Hot R&B/Hip-Hop Songs and number 11 on the US Hot Rap Songs charts.

== Charts ==
=== Weekly charts ===
Chart (2012–2013)	Peak position
US Billboard Hot 100	52
US Hot R&B/Hip-Hop Songs (Billboard)	14
US Hot Rap Songs (Billboard)	11

=== Year-end charts ===
Chart (2013)	Position
US Hot R&B/Hip-Hop Songs (Billboard)	51
US Rap Songs (Billboard)	38

== Certifications ==
Region	Certification	Certified units/sales
United States (RIAA)	Platinum	1,000,000^{‡}
^{‡} Sales+streaming figures based on certification alone.

== Release history ==
List of release dates by region, including format details, and record label
Region	Date	Format	Version	Label
United States	December 4, 2012	Contemporary hit radio	Remix Version	Epic Records
