= Birthday Song (2 Chainz song) =

Single by 2 Chainz featuring Kanye West

from the album Based on a T.R.U. Story
- Released: July 24, 2012
- Recorded: January 2012
- Genre: Hip hop; Southern hip hop; trap
- Length: 5:06
- Label: Def Jam
- Songwriters: Tauheed Epps; Kanye West; Mike Dean; Sonny Uwaezuoke
- Producer: Sonny Digital

2 Chainz singles chronology
"My Moment" (2012)	"Birthday Song" (2012)	"Do My Dance" (2012)

Kanye West singles chronology
"New God Flow" (2012)	"Birthday Song" (2012)	"Clique" (2012)

Music video
- "Birthday Song" on YouTube

"Birthday Song" is a song by American rapper 2 Chainz, released on July 24, 2012, as the second single from his debut studio album, Based on a T.R.U. Story (2012). The song, which features fellow American rapper Kanye West, was produced by Sonny Digital and co-produced by West and BWheezy, with additional production by Anthony Kilhoffer, Lifted and Mike Dean. The hip hop song is about the rapper's yearning for women with large buttocks.

== Music video ==
The music video, released on August 30, 2012, was directed by Andreas Nilsson.

== Live performances ==
On October 9, 2012, 2 Chainz performed the song along with "I'm Different" at the 2012 BET Hip Hop Awards. He also performed the song along with "I'm Different" on Jimmy Kimmel Live.

== Chart performance ==
"Birthday Song" debuted at number 91 on the US Billboard Hot 100 on the week of August 11, 2012. The song fell off the chart the following week. It re-entered the chart at number 100 on the week of September 1, 2012. The song continued to climb the chart, until reached its peak position at number 47 on the week of November 10, 2012. The single ended up spending a total of 20 weeks on the chart. On November 25, 2014, the single was certified double platinum by the Recording Industry Association of America (RIAA) for sales of over two million digital copies in the United States.

Professional ratings
Review scores
Source	Rating
Rolling Stone	3/5 stars

== Charts ==
=== Weekly charts ===
Chart (2012)	Peak position
US Billboard Hot 100	47
US Hot R&B/Hip-Hop Songs (Billboard)	10
US Hot Rap Songs (Billboard)	6
US Rhythmic Airplay (Billboard)	19

=== Year-end charts ===
Chart (2012)	Position
US Hot R&B/Hip-Hop Songs (Billboard)	58
US Rap Songs (Billboard)	41

Chart (2013)	Position
US Hot R&B/Hip-Hop Songs (Billboard)	87

== Certifications ==
Region	Certification	Certified units/sales
United States (RIAA)	2× Platinum	2,000,000^{‡}
^{‡} Sales+streaming figures based on certification alone.

== Release history ==
Country	Date	Format	Label
United States	July 24, 2012	Digital download	Def Jam
United States	August 7, 2012	Urban radio	Def Jam
United States	September 25, 2012	Rhythmic radio	Def Jam
