= Tuesday (iLoveMakonnen song) =

Single by ILoveMakonnen featuring Drake

"Tuesday (Remix)"

Single by ILoveMakonnen featuring Drake

from the album ILoveMakonnen
- Released: September 1, 2014
- Recorded: 2014
- Genre: Cloud rap; alternative R&B
- Length: 5:22: 4:23 (radio edit)
- Label: OVO; Warner Bros.
- Songwriters: Ousala Aleem; Aubrey Graham; Makonnen Sheran; Sonny Uwaezuoke; Leland Wayne Farrow White
- Producers: Sonny Digital; Metro Boomin

ILoveMakonnen singles chronology
"Tuesday (Remix)" (2014)	"I Don't Sell Molly No More" (2014)

Drake singles chronology
"DnF" (2014)	"Tuesday" (2014)	"Only" (2014)

Music video
- "Tuesday" on YouTube

"Tuesday" is the debut single by American rapper ILoveMakonnen, released on September 1, 2014. The song, which was produced by frequent collaborators Sonny Digital and Metro Boomin, featuring guest vocals from Canadian rapper Drake, was released as the first single from his debut extended play (EP), ILoveMakonnen (2014). On March 4, 2015, "Tuesday" was certified platinum by the RIAA, signifying at least 1 million units sold.

== Background ==
On August 12, 2014, Canadian rapper Drake released a remix to the original version of Makonnen's song, titled Club Goin' Up on a Tuesday. On August 31, 2014, it was reported Makonnen signed a recording contract with Drake's record label, OVO Sound. Drake changed the song title to "Tuesday". Drake got in touch with Sonny Digital; the rapper released the remix two days later. On this release, Makonnen said "It was great. I was excited."

== Reception ==
The website Pitchfork awarded a "Best New Track" mention to Drake's remix of the song. In the track review, Patrick Fallon concluded "Somehow, this summertime sleeper hit has become a self-fulfilling prophecy: iLoveMakonnen worked tirelessly to get to this point in his career, and now with a proper success... he can finally party like it's a Tuesday." "Tuesday" placed second in the magazine's year-end list. The song was also named 2nd best song of 2014 by Spin, noting "There's never been a radio hit quite like it before, with the cadence and brio of hip-hop, the musicality and patience of R&B — good R&B, at that — and the strobe-lit sonics and spaciousness of EDM." It was also listed at number 21 on Fader's list of the 116 best tracks of the year. In January 2015, "Tuesday" was ranked at number six on The Village Voice's annual year-end Pazz & Jop critics' poll. The remix featuring Drake received a nomination for Best Rap/Sung Collaboration at the 57th Annual Grammy Awards. In October of 2014 American rapper Fetty Wap made an unofficial remix of Tuesday featuring Monty and P-Dice of The Remy Boyz for his mixtape Zoo Style (2015)

== Music video ==
The song's accompanying music video premiered on October 20, 2014, on iLoveMakonnen's YouTube account. Since its release, the music video has received over 200 million views on YouTube.

== Charts ==
=== Weekly charts ===
Chart (2014–2015)	Peak position
Belgium (Ultratip Bubbling Under Flanders)	22
Belgium Urban (Ultratop Flanders)	14
Belgium (Ultratip Bubbling Under Wallonia)	32
Canada Hot 100 (Billboard)	58
Czech Republic Airplay (ČNS IFPI)	35
France (SNEP)	86
UK Singles (Official Charts Company)	165
UK Hip Hop/R&B (Official Charts)	24
US Billboard Hot 100	12
US Hot R&B/Hip-Hop Songs (Billboard)	2
US Dance Airplay (Billboard)	38
US Pop Airplay (Billboard)	23
US Rhythmic Airplay (Billboard)	1

=== Year-end charts ===
Chart (2014)	Position
US Hot R&B/Hip-Hop Songs (Billboard)	54
Chart (2015)	Position
US Billboard Hot 100	82
US Rhythmic (Billboard)	25

== Certifications ==
Region	Certification	Certified units/sales
New Zealand (RMNZ)	Gold	15,000^{‡}
New Zealand (RMNZ)	Gold	15,000^{‡}
United Kingdom (BPI)	Silver	200,000^{‡}
United States (RIAA)	Platinum	1,000,000^{‡}
^{‡} Sales+streaming figures based on certification alone.

== Release history ==
Region	Date	Format	Label
United States	September 1, 2014	Digital download	OVO Sound; Warner Bros. Records
United States	November 18, 2014	Contemporary hit radio	OVO Sound; Warner Bros. Records

== Burak Yeter and Danelle Sandoval version ==
"Tuesday"

Single by Burak Yeter featuring Danelle Sandoval
- Released: August 12, 2016
- Recorded: 2015–2016
- Genre: Dance; deep house
- Length: 4:01
- Label: Warner Music Russia; Universal Music Türkiye
- Songwriters: Ousala Aleem; Aubrey Graham; Makonnen Sheran; Sonny Uwaezuoke; Leland Wayne

Burak Yeter singles chronology
"Happy" (2016)	"Tuesday" (2016)	"Go" (2016)

Danelle Sandoval singles chronology
"Tuesday" (2016)	"Mad About You" (2017)

"Tuesday" was later recorded by Turkish DJ/producer Burak Yeter and American singer-songwriter Danelle Sandoval. It was originally recorded by Sandoval and then remixed by Yeter. The song was released as a digital download in the UK on August 12, 2016 through Warner Music Group.

=== Music video ===
A music video to accompany the release of "Tuesday" was first released onto YouTube on July 16, 2016 at a total length of three minutes and eleven seconds.

=== Track listing ===
Digital download
No.	Title	Length
1.	"Tuesday" (featuring Danelle Sandoval)	4:01
2.	"Tuesday" (featuring Danelle Sandoval) (radio edit)	3:13

=== Charts and certifications ===
==== Weekly charts ====
Chart (2016–2025)	Peak position
Austria (Ö3 Austria Top 40)	2
Belgium (Ultratop 50 Flanders)	24
Belgium (Ultratop 50 Wallonia)	13
Canada Hot 100 (Billboard)	77
CIS Airplay (TopHit)	1
Czech Republic Singles Digital (ČNS IFPI)	38
Denmark (Tracklisten)	10
Finland (Suomen virallinen lista)	4
France (SNEP)	6
Germany (GfK)	2
Hungary (Dance Top 40)	1
Hungary (Rádiós Top 40)	2
Hungary (Single Top 40)	2
Ireland (IRMA)	94
Italy (FIMI)	91
Latvia (Latvijas Top 40)	4
Mexico Airplay (Billboard)	4
Moldova Airplay (TopHit)	43
Netherlands (Dutch Top 40)	9
Netherlands (Single Top 100)	19
Norway (VG-lista)	5
Poland Airplay (ZPAV)	3
Poland Dance (ZPAV)	2
Romania (Airplay 100)	4
Romania TV Airplay (Media Forest)	1
Russia Airplay (TopHit)	1
Slovakia Airplay (ČNS IFPI)	3
Slovakia Singles Digital (ČNS IFPI)	3
Slovenia Airplay (SloTop50)	18
Spain (Promusicae)	62
Sweden (Sverigetopplistan)	6
Switzerland (Schweizer Hitparade)	4
Ukraine Airplay (TopHit)	49

==== Monthly charts ====
Chart (2025)	Peak position
Moldova Airplay (TopHit)	56

==== Year-end charts ====
Chart (2017)	Position
Austria (Ö3 Austria Top 40)	5
Belgium (Ultratop Flanders)	88
Belgium (Ultratop Wallonia)	30
Denmark (Tracklisten)	51
Germany (Official German Charts)	5
Hungary (Dance Top 40)	3
Hungary (Rádiós Top 40)	3
Hungary (Single Top 40)	4
Hungary (Stream Top 40)	14
Latvia Airplay (LaIPA)	33
Netherlands (Dutch Top 40)	57
Netherlands (Single Top 100)	77
Poland Airplay (ZPAV)	27
Slovenia Airplay (SloTop50)	39
Sweden (Sverigetopplistan)	28
Switzerland (Schweizer Hitparade)	15

Chart (2018)	Position
Hungary (Dance Top 40)	4
Hungary (Rádiós Top 40)	41
Hungary (Single Top 40)	71

Chart (2019)	Position
Hungary (Dance Top 40)	90

Chart (2022)	Position
Hungary (Rádiós Top 40)	65

Chart (2023)	Position
Hungary (Rádiós Top 40)	98

Chart (2024)	Peak position
Hungary (Rádiós Top 40)	70

==== Certifications ====
Region	Certification	Certified units/sales
Austria (IFPI Austria)	Platinum	30,000^{‡}
Belgium (BRMA)	Platinum	20,000^{‡}
Denmark (IFPI Danmark)	Platinum	90,000^{‡}
France (SNEP)	Diamond	233,333^{‡}
Germany (BVMI)	2× Platinum	800,000^{‡}
Italy (FIMI)	Platinum	50,000^{‡}
Netherlands (NVPI)	Platinum	40,000^{‡}
New Zealand (RMNZ)	Gold	15,000^{‡}
Poland (ZPAV)	3× Platinum	150,000^{‡}
Spain (Promusicae)	Gold	30,000^{‡}
Switzerland (IFPI Switzerland)	Platinum	30,000^{‡}
United Kingdom (BPI)	Silver	200,000^{‡}
^{‡} Sales+streaming figures based on certification alone.

=== Release history ===
Release dates and formats for "Tuesday"
Region	Date	Format(s)	Version	Label(s)	Ref.
Various	August 12, 2016	Digital download	Original	Warner Music Group	
Various	October 7, 2017	Digital download	Radio edit	Warner Music Group	
Italy	October 14, 2017	Contemporary hit radio	Original	Warner Music Group	
Various	February 3, 2017	Digital download	Remixes	Warner Music Group	
Various	April 28, 2017	Digital download	Harmo Vibes Remix	Warner Music Group	
