= Sonny Digital =

American record producer, rapper, and DJ

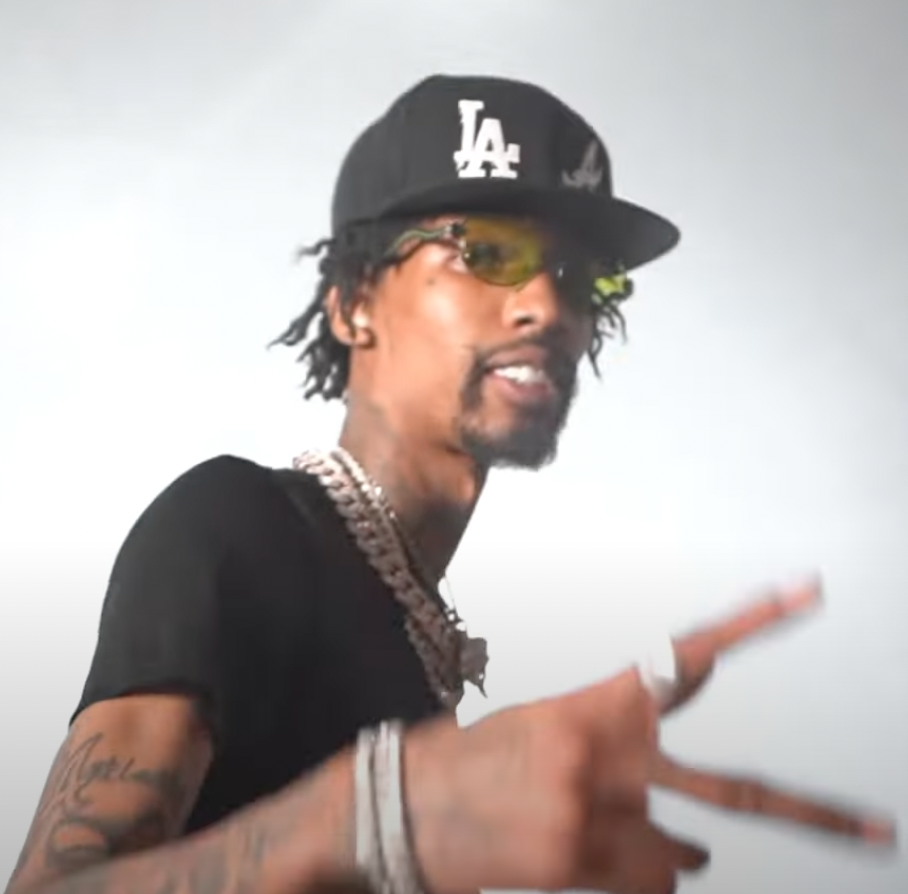
- Sonny Digital in 2022

Background information
- Born: Sonny Corey Uwaezuoke; March 5, 1991 (age 35); Saginaw, Michigan, U.S.
- Origin: Atlanta, Georgia, U.S.
- Genres: Hip-hop; trap
- Occupations: Record producer; rapper; disc jockey
- Years active: 2010–present
- Labels: Universal Publishing; 1017 Brick Squad; Rollin; E1
- Website: www.sonnydigital.com

Sonny Corey Uwaezuoke (born March 5, 1991), better known by his stage name Sonny Digital, is an American record producer, rapper, and DJ. He first saw recognition for his production work on YC's 2011 single "Racks", which peaked within the top 50 of the Billboard Hot 100. Throughout the following decade, he was credited on a string of commercially successful hip hop and trap singles, including ILoveMakonnen's "Tuesday", Future's "Same Damn Time", 50 Cent's "I'm the Man", 2 Chainz's "Birthday Song", and Travis Scott's "Stargazing". Uwaezuoke has also produced for XXL Magazine's Freshman Hip Hop Cyphers in 2017 and 2018, and pursued a career as a recording artist.

Early in their respective careers, he discovered and worked in tandem with Metro Boomin, 808 Mafia, Southside, and TM88 for his productions. He signed with Universal Music Publishing Group in 2014.

== Early life ==
Sonny, of Nigerian Igbo descent, was born on March 5, 1991, in Saginaw, Michigan and quickly moved to Atlanta, Georgia while still an infant. He has been involved in making music since an early age. At first he started rapping while at school, but found it hard to get instrumentals to rap over. When he was 13, he was influenced by his older cousin to start making beats. Aside from school, Sonny didn't have other hobbies like playing sports or video games, so he dedicated a large amount of his free time to creating music. Sonny was inspired by famous producers Shawty Redd and Drumma Boy and initially tried to copy their sound while learning to make beats. Eventually his production transformed into his own style.

== Career ==
=== 2011–2013: First charting singles and success ===
When he was 16, he joined a hip-hop group as a producer and was also producing mixtapes for other local artists. In 2011, YC used one of his beats for the single "Racks", which went to become a national hit, peaking at #42 on the Billboard Hot 100 and being certified Gold by RIAA. The song was also featured in the Billboard 2011 Year-end Rap songs and R&B/Hip-hop songs charts.

Sonny released his first official mixtape Digital History on May 9, 2011. The tape, hosted by DJ 1Hunnit, is a collection of songs Sonny had produced between 2010 and 2011. It features many rappers, such as Plies, Wale, 2 Chainz and Future. It has been viewed over 70,000 times on LiveMixtapes.

Sonny produced six songs on Gorilla Zoe's album King Kong released in June. Sonny's second mixtape Behind the Muzik was released on September 8, 2011. It is a collaboration with fellow producer Will A Fool, where each produced half of the songs.

In late 2011, Sonny produced Future's hit single "Same Damn Time", which was initially featured on Future's mixtape Streetz Calling. Following the song's success, in 2012 Future released a new version of "Same Damn Time" as the third official single from his debut album Pluto. It peaked at number 92 on the Billboard Hot 100. A music video for the single was released on April 4, 2012. Sonny Digital also produced the official remix of "Same Damn Time" featuring rappers Diddy and Ludacris, which was released on May 17, 2012. The remix was featured on Future's re-release of Pluto, titled Pluto 3D.

In March 2012, Sonny produced Gorilla Zoe's mixtape Gorilla Zoe World. The tape was certified bronze for being downloaded over 25,000 times on popular mixtape site DatPiff. In early 2012 Sonny also worked on Gucci Mane's mixtapes Trap Back and I'm Up. On June 8, 2012, Sonny Digital released his debut rap single, "Business Man", featuring rapper Que. The song was produced by BWheezy.

Sonny produced 2 Chainz' single "Birthday Song", which was released on July 24, 2012. Sonny created the original beat, which was later modified by a number of GOOD Music producers – Kanye West, BWheezy, Anthony Kilhoffer, Lifted and Mike Dean. The single peaked at number 49 on the US Hot 100, and also entered top 10 of the R&B and Rap charts. The official music video was released on August 30, 2012, and became a viral success, gaining over 30 million views on YouTube.

Later in 2012, Sonny produced the track "Don't Get Me Started", which was featured on the deluxe version of DJ Khaled's album Kiss the Ring, as well as on Ace Hood's mixtape Body Bag 2. The official video for the promo single was released on August 17, 2012, on Ace Hood's YouTube channel. Sonny was featured on Jo FloWroshus' single "Attention" from his 900° album. In an interview with BET Sonny stated he was working with artists B.o.B, Ace Hood and Wiz Khalifa, and making a new mixtape with fellow producer Drumma Boy. He also wants to work with a famous pop singer like Justin Bieber.

In March 2013, Sonny released a collaboration mixtape with rapper Que, titled Forbes Atlanta.

=== 2014–present: Billboard top 10 and more projects ===
In 2014, Sonny produced the track "Tuesday" by ILoveMakonnen and Drake. The song peaked at number 12 on the Billboard Hot 100.

In August 2018, Sonny produced the Travis Scott song "Stargazing", which peaked at number eight on the Hot 100 and earned Sonny his highest charting single.

In 2019, Sonny announced a follow-up collaboration project with Black Boe, the album to be titled Black Goat II, after 2017's Black Goat.

== Other ventures ==
In 2011, Sonny founded his own self-titled record label.

== Artistry ==
Sonny uses the music production software FL Studio along with custom plug-ins to make his beats. He seeks inspiration in listening to other producers' tracks, music in general and watching movies.

His producer tag, which announces "Sonny Digital", was recorded by Jaye Neutron.

== Discography ==
=== Mixtapes ===
- 2011 – Digital History, hosted by DJ 1Hunnit
- 2011 – Behind the Muzik (with Will A Fool), hosted by DJ Iceberg & DJ Pretty Boy Tank
- 2012 – Gorilla Zoe World (with Gorilla Zoe), hosted by Trap-A-Holics, DJ Smallz & DJ Nando
- 2013 – Forbes Atlanta (with Que), hosted by DJ Scream & DJ Spinz
- 2016 – MadeInDigital (with MadeinTYO)
- 2017 – Black G.O.A.T (with Black Boe)

=== Singles ===
- 2012 – "Business Man" (feat. Que) (prod. by BWheezy)
- 2018 – "I Got" (feat. Lil Xan & $teven Cannon) (prod. by DJFU)
- 2019 – "Work" (prod. by Nebu Kiniza)

== Production discography ==
=== Charted songs ===
Title	Year	Peak chart positions						Certifications	Album
Title	Year	US	US R&B/HH	US Rap	AUS	CAN	UK	Certifications	Album
"Racks" (YC featuring Future)	2011	42	6	4	—	—	—	RIAA: Gold	Rack Nation
"Same Damn Time" (Future)	2012	92	12	16	—	—	—		Pluto
"Birthday Song" (2 Chainz featuring Kanye West)	2012	47	10	8	—	—	—	RIAA: 2× Platinum	Based on a T.R.U. Story
"Tuesday" (ILoveMakonnen featuring Drake)	2014	12	2	—	—	58	165	RIAA: Platinum	ILoveMakonnen
"Up Like Trump" (Rae Sremmurd)	2015	— (Note: "Up Like Trump" did not enter the Billboard Hot 100, but peaked at number 16 on the Bubbling Under Hot 100 chart.)	42	15	—	—	—	RIAA: Gold	SremmLife
"Blow a Bag" (Future)	2015	95	26	22	—	—	—	RIAA: Platinum	DS2
"I'm the Man" (50 Cent featuring Chris Brown)	2015	— (Note: "I'm the Man" did not chart on the Billboard Hot 100, but did peak at number 10 on the Bubbling Under Hot 100 chart.)	46	—	—	—	—	RIAA: Gold; BPI: Silver	The Kanan Tape
"Red Opps" (21 Savage)	2016	74	31	25	—	—	—	RIAA: Platinum	Free Guwop
"Froze" (Meek Mill featuring Lil Uzi Vert and Nicki Minaj)	2016	68	28	21	—	94	—		DC4
"Regrets" Smokepurpp	2017	—	—	—	—	98	—		Bloom
"Stargazing" (Travis Scott)	2018	8	7	7	10	7	15	RIAA: Platinum	Astroworld
"Cardigan" (Don Toliver)	2020	90	—	—	—	—	—		Heaven or Hell
"After Party" (Don Toliver)	2020	57	23	20	—	35	—		Heaven or Hell

== Production credits ==
=== 2011 ===
Gorilla Zoe – King Kong

- 03 – "Crazy" (featuring Gucci Mane) (with Jesse "Corporal" Wilson)
- 04 – "Nasty" (featuring Yo Gotti)
- 05 – "At All" (featuring Ray Dinero)
- 06 – "What's Goin On"
- 08 – "Your Bitch"
- 09 – "My Shawty"

Wiz Khalifa – Cabin Fever

- 08 – "WTF" (with Lex Luger)

YC – NBA Live 2005 Exclusive

- 01 – "Racks" (featuring Future)

Juicy J – Rubba Band Business 2

- 04 – "You"
- 13 – "Bought Some Guns Yesterday"

Roscoe Dash – J.U.I.C.E.

- 06 – "Very First Time"
- 07 – "Awesome"

Kevin Gates – Drug Dealer Potential

- 01 – "Drug Dealer Potential"

Ace Hood – Blood, Sweat & Tears

- 06 – "Memory Lane" (featuring Kevin Cossom)

Wale – The Eleven One Eleven Theory

- 09 – "Passive Agrees-Her"

Juicy J – Blue Dream & Lean

- 03 – "Juicy J Can't"
- 08 – "Geeked Up On Them Bars"
- 17 – "You Want Deez Rackz" (with Lex Luger)
- 23 – "Been Gettin' Money"

Future – Streetz Calling

- 02 – "Same Damn Time"

Yung Joc – Ready To Fly

- 02 – "Deuces" (featuring Tity Boi)

2 Chainz – UNKNOWN

- 00 – "10 Summaz" (featuring Rick Ross)

Kid Ink – Wheels Up

- 06 – "Never Change"

=== 2012 ===
Jody Breeze – Airplane Mode

- 04 – "Hood Shit" (featuring Big Gee)
- 11 – "Aliens" (featuring Raven Ramone)
- 14 – "Sprint" (featuring Cash Out)

Future – Astronaut Status

- 08 – "Jordan Diddy" (featuring Gucci Mane)

Gorilla Zoe – Gorilla Zoe World

- All songs

Gucci Mane – Trap Back

- 02 – "Back in 95"

SPOT – The Price Iz Right

- 02 – "Young N!ggaz Gettin $" (featuring Sonny Digital)

Gucci Mane – I'm Up

- 09 – "Drink Mud"

Future – Pluto

- 11 – "Same Damn Time"

Young Lace – Above Average

- 05 – "Sold Out" (featuring Dubb & Cashout Kidd)
- 06 – "Ball" (featuring Cashout Kidd & Mann)
- 12 – "Money In" (featuring Kid Ink)
- 14 – "How We Ball" (featuring T.I. & Don)

Juicy J – Blue Dream & Lean (Bonus Tracks)

- 05 – "Money Mane (Remix)"
- 06 – "These Hands"

Chevy Woods – Gang Land

- 15 – "M'Fer" (featuring Wiz Khalifa)

Waka Flocka Flame – Triple F Life

- 18 – "Everything I Love" (featuring Future & Trouble) (with Southside)

Jackie Chain – Bruce Lean Chronicles

- 04 – "Numbers"

2 Chainz – Based on a T.R.U. Story

- 05 – "Birthday Song" (featuring Kanye West) (with Kanye West (co.), BWheezy (co.), Anthony Kilhoffer (add.), Lifted (add.) and Mike Dean (add.))

DJ Khaled – Kiss the Ring

- 13 – "Don't Get Me Started" (featuring Ace Hood)

Ace Hood – Body Bag 2

- 07 – "Don't Get Me Started"
- 10 – "Lottery" (featuring Kevin Cossom)

Trae Tha Truth – Tha Blackprint

- 03 – "Choppa Talk" (featuring Young Jeezy & Yo Gotti)

Diamond – The Young Life

- 03 – "Reality Check"
- 09 – "The Thirst"

Rocko – Wordplay

- 01 – "Re" (with Hollywood J)

Roscoe Dash – Roscoe 2.0

- 10 – "No Days Off"

Reese – Reese Vs. The World 2

- 06 – "Again" (featuring Curtis Williams)

B.o.B – Fuck 'Em We Ball

- 13 – "Greedy Love"

Young Lace – Bipolar

- 03 – "Papered Up"
- 06 – "Pick it Up"

Future – Pluto 3D

- 03 – "First Class Flights"
- 07 – "My"
- 08 – "Same Damn Time (Remix)" (featuring Diddy & Ludacris)

Frank Whyte – 1728

- 03 – "I'm Smashin'" (featuring MopTop)

=== 2013 ===
Sonny Digital & Que – Forbes Atlanta

- 01 – "Forbes Atlanta Intro"
- 02 – "Young Nigga"
- 03 – "DJ Ray G Speaks"
- 17 – "Never Goin Broke"

Chief Keef

- "Where He Get It" (with 808 Mafia & Metro Boomin)

Ace Hood – Trials & Tribulations

- 04 – "Before The Rollie" (featuring Meek Mill)
- 10 – "Pray For Me" (with 808 Mafia & Metro Boomin)

=== 2014 ===
Young Money – Young Money: Rise of an Empire

- 03 – "Bang" (featuring Lil Twist, Euro, and Cory Gunz)

Wiz Khalifa – 28 Grams

- 12 – "Jim Brown"
- 17 – "Banger" (featuring Ty Dolla $ign)
- 24 – "OUY"

Wiz Khalifa – Blacc Hollywood

- 17 – "Word On the Town" (produced with Juicy J)

B.o.B – No Genre Pt. 2

- 07 – "Get Right" (featuring Mike Fresh)

ILoveMakonnen – ILoveMakonnen

- 02 – "I Don't Sell Molly No More" (featuring Wiz Khalifa)
- 03 – "Tuesday" (featuring Drake) (produced with Metro Boomin)

=== 2015 ===
Kourtney Money – The Return Of Money (Zone 6 Edition)

- 08 – "Tell 'Em Again" (featuring Young Nudy)

Future – DS2

- 04 – "Groupies" (produced with Metro Boomin & Southside)
- 10 – "Blow a Bag" (produced with Metro Boomin & Southside)

Travis Scott – Rodeo

- 01 – "Pornography" (produced with Metro Boomin)
- 15 – "Ok/Alright" (featuring Schoolboy Q) (produced with Metro Boomin & Mike Dean)
- 16 – "Never Catch Me" (produced with Allen Ritter & WondaGurl)

Juicy J – 100% Juice

- 03 – ''Beans And Lean''
- 04 – ''Shut Da Fuc Up''
- 06 – ''You Knew''
- 07 – ''Scrape'' (featuring Wiz Khalifa & Project Pat)
- 15 – "Touch Da Sky First" (produced with Metro Boomin, Southside, Lex Luger, and Crazy Mike)

Chief Keef – Finally Rollin 2

- 03 – "Black Ops"
- 17 – "Jumanji" (produced with Metro Boomin)

Chief Keef – Cabinet Fever

- 01 – "Tweaker"
- 03 – "Drag Racin"
- 05 – "BIH"
- 06 – "Straight to the Bank"

Wiz Khalifa – Cabin Fever 3

- 02 – "Move On" (featuring Kevin Gates)
- 03 – "Prequel" (featuring Curren$y)
- 06 – "No Worries" (featuring Chevy Woods)
- 07 – "Finish Line" (featuring Project Pat)
- 09 – "Gangster 101" (featuring King Los)
- 10 – "Left" (featuring Yo Gotti)

50 Cent – The Kanan Tape

- 05 – "I'm The Man" (featuring Sonny Digital)

Juicy J – OS To Oscar

- 01 – "Intro"
- 02 – "Durdy" (produced with Metro Boomin & Southside)
- 04 – "Curve Dat"

Migos & Rich The Kid – Streets on Lock 4

- 18 – "Richer Than Rappers"

Young Buck – 10 Pints

- 03 – "Ok"

YFN Lucci – Wish Me Well

- 14 – "So What" (featuring Johnny Cinco)

PnB Rock – RNB 3 : Philadelphia

- 06 – "Fall N Luv"
- 10 – "Band$ on You"
- 11 – "Aftermath"
- 12 – "Alone"

Young Thug – Slime Season

- 02 – "Quarterback" (featuring Migos & Peewee Longway)

Jeezy – Gangsta Party

- 07 – "Pot Life"

Que – I Am Que

- 04 – "Gucci Said"

Lil Uzi Vert – Luv is Rage

- 06 – "Right Now"

Ty Dolla Sign – Airplane Mode

- 05 – "Do Thangs" (produced with Ty Dolla Sign)

Que – Lost Dawg

- "Back"

Key! - Screaming Dreams : The Prelude

- 01 – "Hell Yeah"
- 02 – "50 Round Drum" (featuring 21 Savage) (produced with Metro Boomin and TM88)
- 04 – "Raise Hell" (produced with Zaytoven)

21 Savage – Free Guwop

- 02 – "H2O" (produced with Zaytoven)
- 03 – "One Foot"
- 04 – "Supply" (produced with Metro Boomin & Southside)
- 05 – "Red Opps"
- 06 – "12 AM"
- 07 – "Twenty1"

21 Savage – Slaughter King

- 04 – "Wow"

SD – Just The Beginning

- 05 – "Fascinated"

Ace Hood – Starvation 4

- 05 – "954"

Key!

- "Store Run"

Zuse – Trap Zuse

- 02 – "Percy Miller"

OJ Juiceman – 6 Rings 3

- 06 – "Space Jam"

Lil Uzi Vert

- "So Hit"

Jeezy – CITS

- "No Other Way"

=== 2016 ===
Landstrip Chip – Cruising Control

- 02 – "On My Cross"
- 08 – "Bells" (featuring Droffe)

Sonny Digital – G.O.A.T

- 04 – "Don't Play" (featuring Young Sizzle and Juicy J)

Meek Mill – DC4

- 05 – "Froze" (featuring Lil Uzi Vert and Nicki Minaj)
- 06 – "The Difference" (featuring Quavo)

Chief Keef

- "Stand"

Chief Keef – Camp GloTiggy

- 13 – "Beethoven" (produced with TM88 and Zaytoven)

=== 2017 ===
Machine Gun Kelly – Bloom

- 07 – "Trap Paris" (featuring Quavo & Ty Dolla $ign)

Smokepurpp

- "Nobody" (featuring Lil Peep) (produced with Metro Boomin & Southside)

=== 2018 ===
Big Cat & PFTCommenter

- "Drink Paint" (featuring Tyler I Am)

Travis Scott – Astroworld

- 01 – "Stargazing" (produced with B Wheezy, Bkorn and 30 Roc)

=== 2019 ===
Beyoncé – Homecoming: The Live Album

- 10 – "I Been On"

Big Cat & PFTCommenter

- "Chonk (It's Chonk)" (featuring Tyler I am)

=== 2020 ===
Don Toliver – Heaven or Hell

- 03 – "Cardigan" (produced with Frank Dukes, Cvre, Mido, & Mike Dean
- 04 – "After Party" (produced with Mike Dean, Travis Scott, Cubeatz, & Nils)
- 10 – "Spaceship" (featuring Sheck Wes) (produced with Frank Dukes & Mike Dean)

Pap Chanel & Future

- "Gucci Bucket Hat" (produced with Rio Leyva & Project X)

=== 2021 ===
Don Toliver – Life of a Don

- 03 – "Way Bigger" (produced with Bryvn, FrankieXY, & Sir Dylan)
