= List of Billboard 200 number-one albums of 2012 =

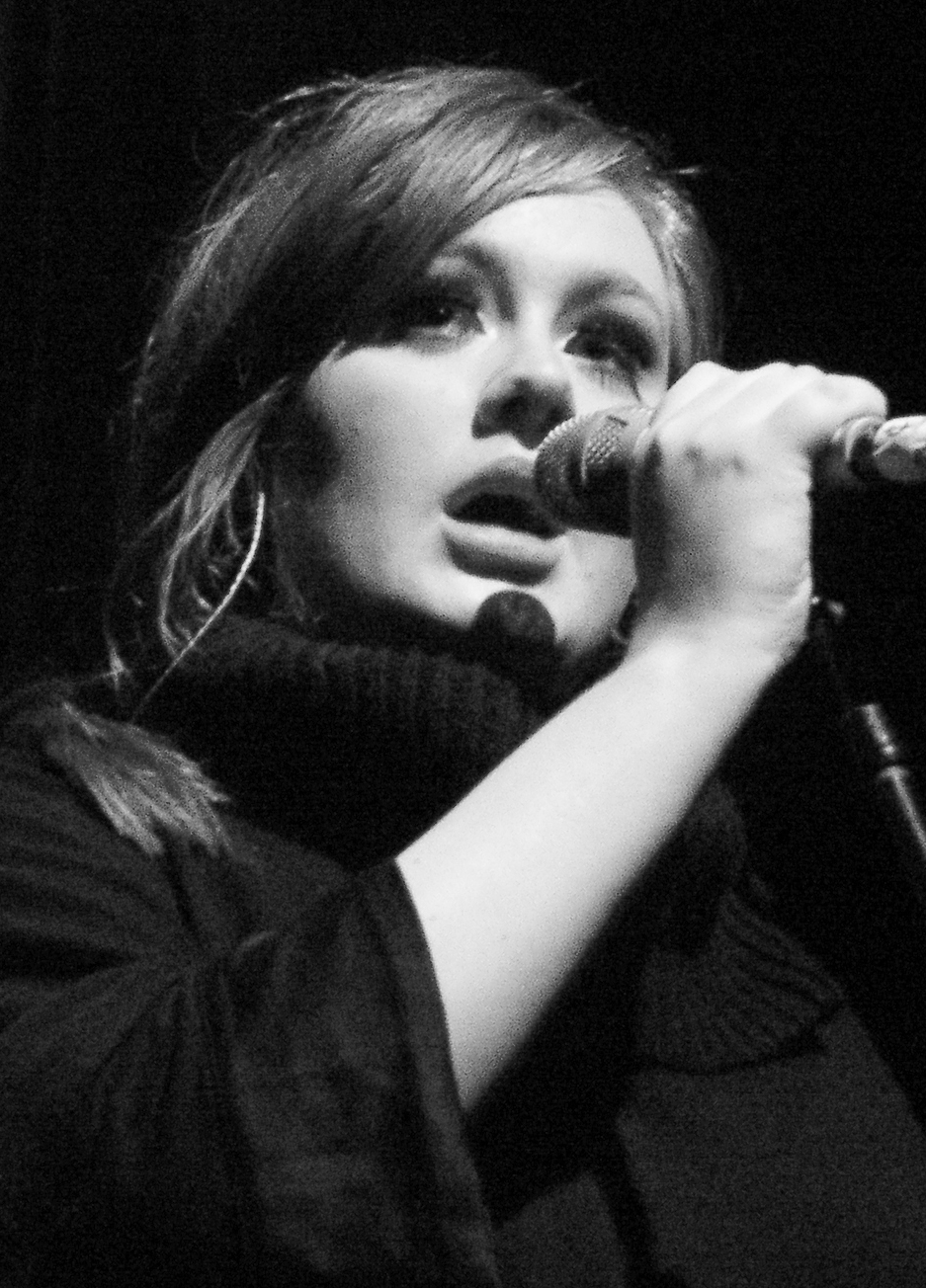
Adele's 21 was the best-selling album of 2012. This was her second consecutive year at the top of the U.S. year-end charts. She became the second artist in history to achieve this feat, after Michael Jackson.

The highest-selling albums and EPs in the United States are ranked in the Billboard 200, which is published by Billboard magazine. The data are compiled by Nielsen Soundscan based on each album's weekly physical and digital sales. In 2012, a total of 32 albums claimed the top position of the chart. One of which, Canadian singer Michael Bublé's album Christmas started its peak in late 2011.

Adele's album 21 was the longest-running number-one album of the year for the second time, staying atop the chart for eleven non-consecutive weeks. Red by Taylor Swift had the second-most weeks at number one with five. Other albums with extended chart runs include Babel by Mumford & Sons, Tuskegee by Lionel Richie, Blown Away by Carrie Underwood, Born and Raised by John Mayer and Uncaged by Zac Brown Band; each spent two weeks on the top position. Throughout 2012, only one act achieved multiple number-one albums on the chart: One Direction with Up All Night and Take Me Home. Swift's album Red sold 1.21 million copies in its first week, making it the album with the highest weekly sales in 2012. 21 was the biggest-selling album of 2012, with 4,410,000 copies sold.

== Chart history ==
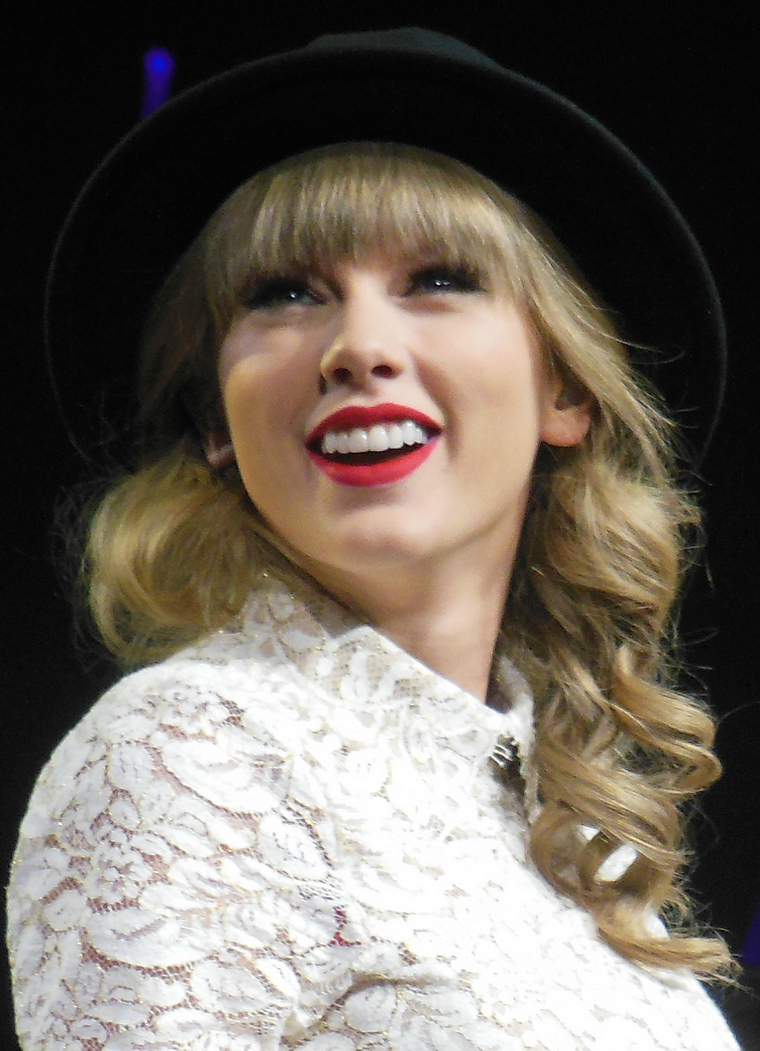
Taylor Swift's Red earned the singer-songwriter her third number-one album. It opened with the biggest sales week of 2012, selling 1.21 million copies in its first week.

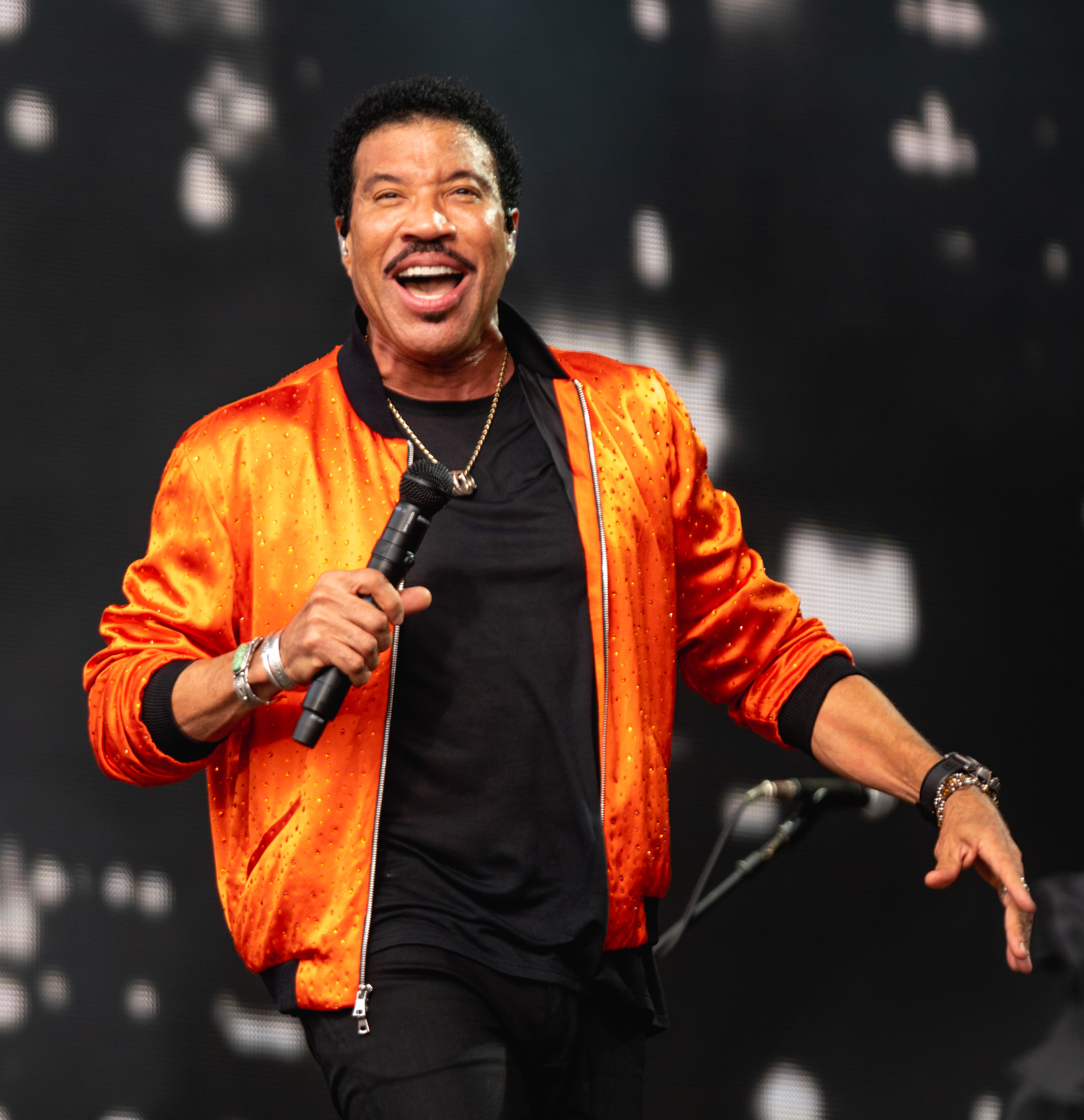
Lionel Richie's Tuskegee gave the singer his third number-one album and the first since 1986's Dancing on the Ceiling.

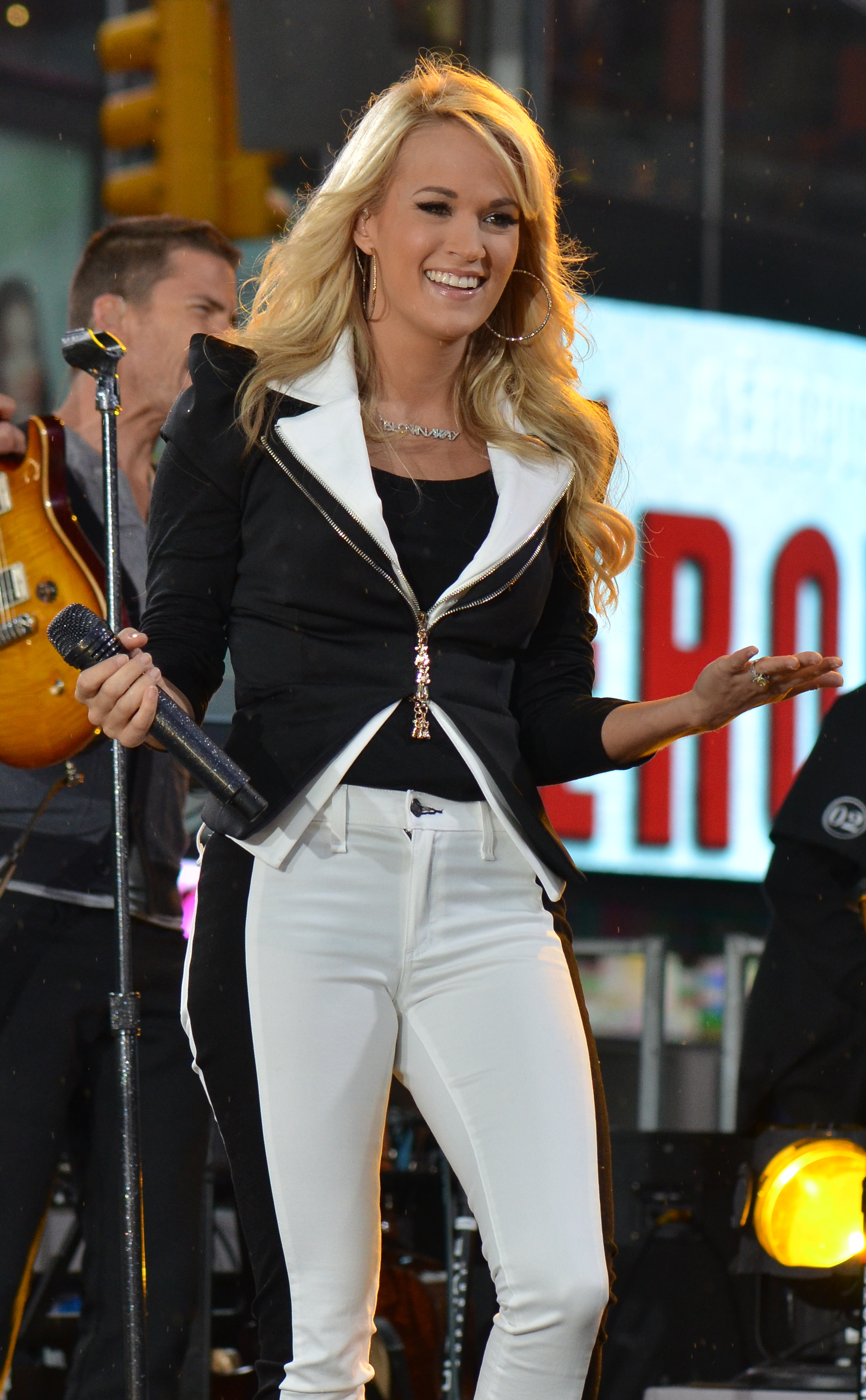
Country singer Carrie Underwood earned her third number-one album, Blown Away, which became her first to spend more than a week at the top.

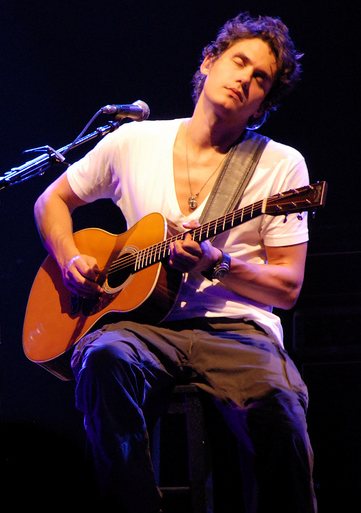
Rock singer John Mayer scored his second chart-topping album, Born and Raised, which spent two consecutive weeks at number one.

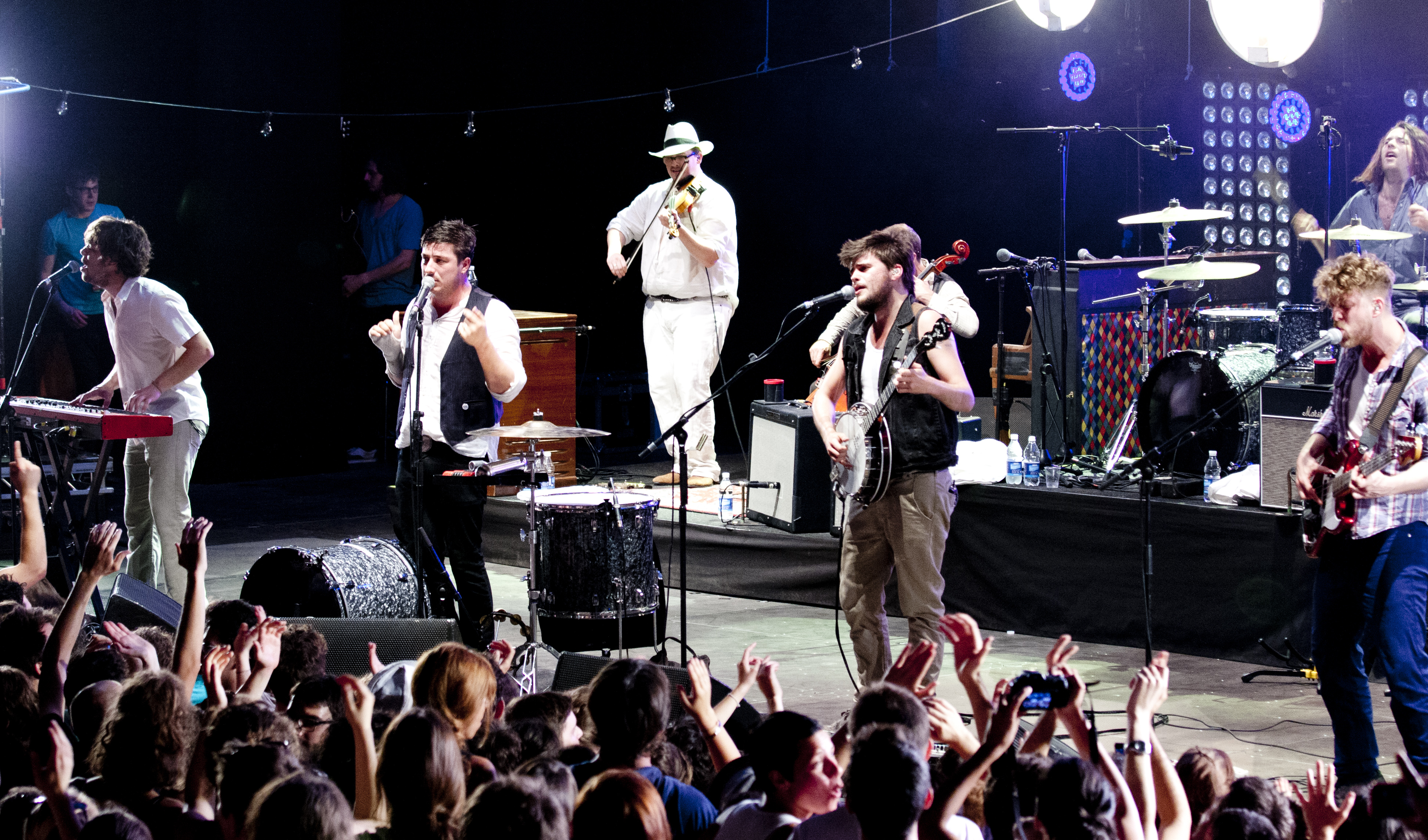
Babel by British folk rock band Mumford & Sons garnered their first number-one. It topped the chart for three consecutive weeks, and earned 2012's second-biggest sales week after Red.

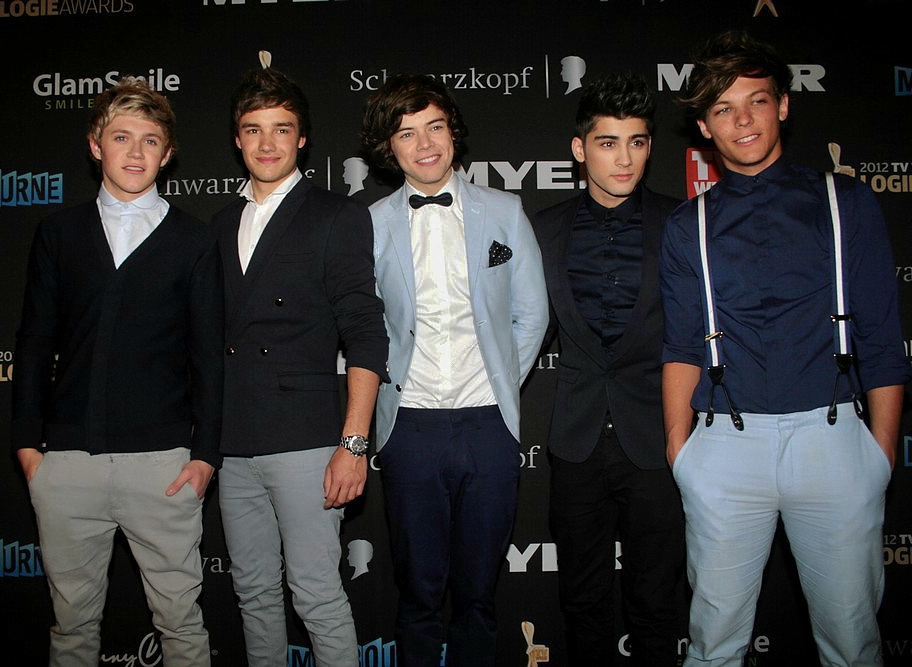
English-Irish boy band One Direction scored two number-one albums in 2012, Up All Night and Take Me Home.

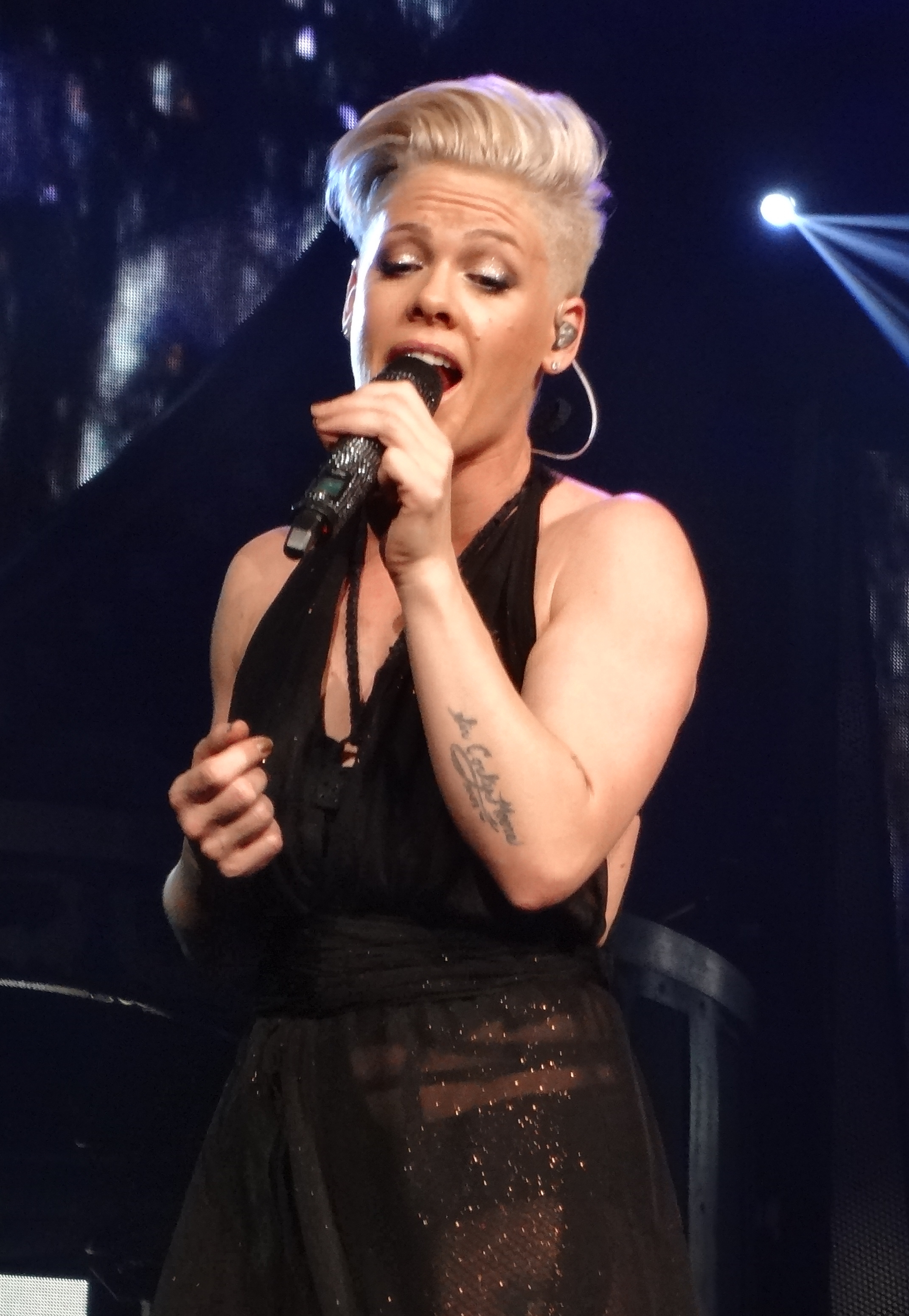
Pink earned her first number-one album with her sixth effort The Truth About Love, released twelve years since her debut. It has the third biggest debut sales by a female singer in this year, behind MDNA and Red.

Key
†	Indicates best performing album of 2012

Issue date	Album	Artist(s)	Sales	Ref.
January 7	Christmas	Michael Bublé	467,000	
January 14	21 †	Adele	144,000	
January 21	21 †	Adele	124,000	
January 28	21 †	Adele	104,000	
February 4	21 †	Adele	95,000	
February 11	21 †	Adele	116,000	
February 18	21 †	Adele	122,000	
February 25	21 †	Adele	237,000	
March 3	21 †	Adele	730,000	
March 10	21 †	Adele	297,000	
March 17	21 †	Adele	247,000	
March 24	Wrecking Ball	Bruce Springsteen	196,000	
March 31	Up All Night	One Direction	176,000	
April 7	The Hunger Games: Songs from District 12 and Beyond	Soundtrack	175,000	
April 14	MDNA	Madonna	359,000	
April 21	Pink Friday: Roman Reloaded	Nicki Minaj	253,000	
April 28	Tuskegee	Lionel Richie	129,000	
May 5	Tuskegee	Lionel Richie	114,000	
May 12	Blunderbuss	Jack White	138,000	
May 19	Blown Away	Carrie Underwood	267,000	
May 26	Blown Away	Carrie Underwood	120,000	
June 2	Trespassing	Adam Lambert	77,000	
June 9	Born and Raised	John Mayer	219,000	
June 16	Born and Raised	John Mayer	65,000	
June 23	21 †	Adele	75,000	
June 30	Looking 4 Myself	Usher	128,000	
July 7	Believe	Justin Bieber	374,000	
July 14	Living Things	Linkin Park	223,000	
July 21	Fortune	Chris Brown	135,000	
July 28	Uncaged	Zac Brown Band	234,000	
August 4	Life Is Good	Nas	149,000	
August 11	Uncaged	Zac Brown Band	48,000	
August 18	God Forgives, I Don't	Rick Ross	218,000	
August 25	Now 43	Various artists	111,000	
September 1	Based on a T.R.U. Story	2 Chainz	75,000	
September 8	Chapter V	Trey Songz	135,000	
September 15	Eye on It	TobyMac	69,000	
September 22	North	Matchbox Twenty	95,000	
September 29	Away from the World	Dave Matthews Band	266,000	
October 6	The Truth About Love	Pink	280,000	
October 13	Babel	Mumford & Sons	600,000	
October 20	Babel	Mumford & Sons	169,000	
October 27	Babel	Mumford & Sons	96,000	
November 3	Night Train	Jason Aldean	409,000	
November 10	Red	Taylor Swift	1,208,000	
November 17	Red	Taylor Swift	344,000	
November 24	Red	Taylor Swift	196,000	
December 1	Take Me Home	One Direction	540,000	
December 8	Unapologetic	Rihanna	238,000	
December 15	Girl on Fire	Alicia Keys	159,000	
December 22	Red	Taylor Swift	167,000	
December 29	Red	Taylor Swift	208,000	

== See also ==
- 2012 in music
- List of Hot 100 number-one singles of 2012 (U.S.)
