= Danelle Sandoval =

American singer-songwriter

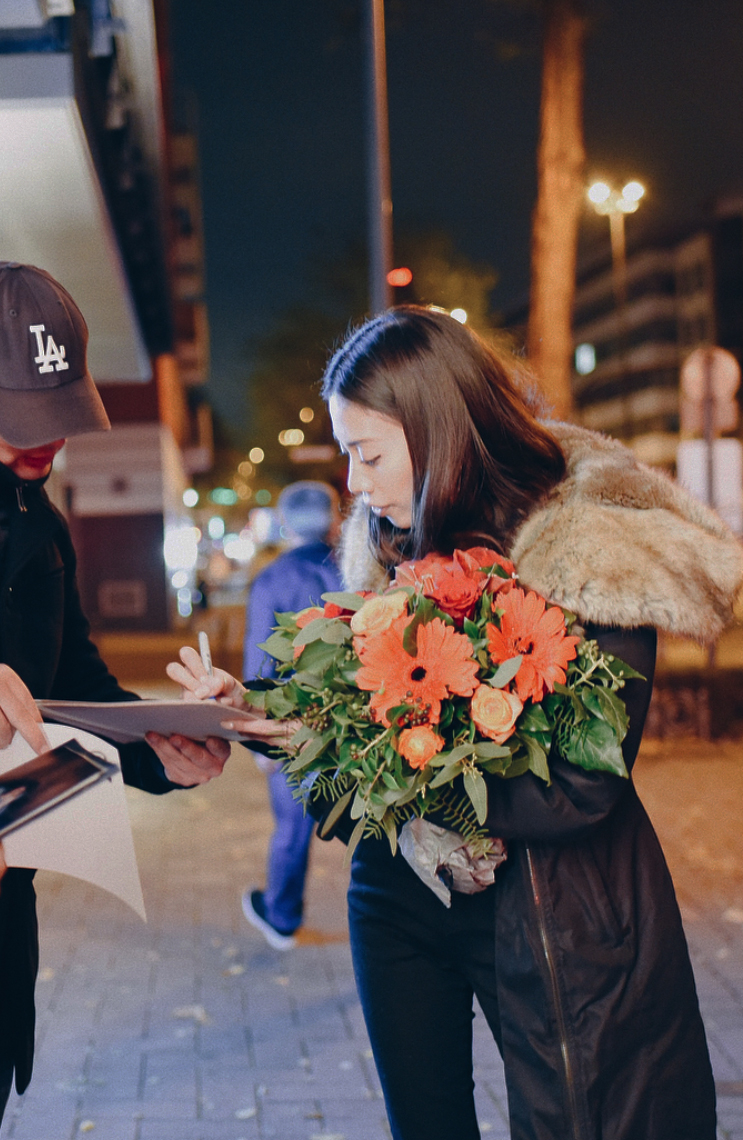
- Sandoval in 2019

Background information
- Born: Danelle Ann Sandoval; Los Angeles, California, United States
- Genre: Pop
- Occupation: Singer-songwriter
- Years active: 2013–present
- Website: danellemusic.com

Danelle Ann Sandoval is an American singer-songwriter known for her feature on the multi-platinum single "Tuesday" as well as her 2018 debut EP entitled For Love. The pop music and R&B artist has also performed live across North America and Europe and contributed to multiple international albums as a songwriter.

== Early life ==
Born in Los Angeles, California and a graduate of University of California Berkeley, Danelle spent her formative years between both Southern California and Northern California. Following her graduation from UC Berkeley, Danelle would go onto spend time between Los Angeles, New York City and Toronto, Canada focusing on her music and songwriting career.

== Career ==
After publishing a widely popular YouTube cover of Tuesday by ILoveMakonnen ft. Drake, the song was remixed by Turkish DJ/Producer Burak Yeter and released by Warner Music in 2016. The hit song went on to receive multiple platinum awards worldwide while reaching the No. 1 spot in over 70 countries on iTunes and Shazam. The viral hit has amassed over 1 billion streams online and has appeared on multiple Billboard 100 charts in countries including Sweden, Canada, Mexico while peaking at No. 1 in Germany.

Following the global success of "Tuesday", Danelle has since released original music, which includes Mad About You produced by Dutch musician / producer Koni. Mad About You achieved moderate success in Europe and North America.

In 2018, Danelle launched her debut EP For Love, which was inspired by time spent in Toronto. The album was well-received by critics establishing her as a "polished pop star with an airy voice." Clash Magazine called her track Hands "a beautifully creative pop hymn with some blissful electronic leanings."

As a songwriter, Danelle has written for multiple international recording artists. In 2018 she co-wrote 披著狼皮的羊 (Wolf in Sheep's Skin) on Cyndi Wang's 2018 studio album 愛·心凌 (Cyndi Loves 2 Sing) which was released in Taiwan on Universal.

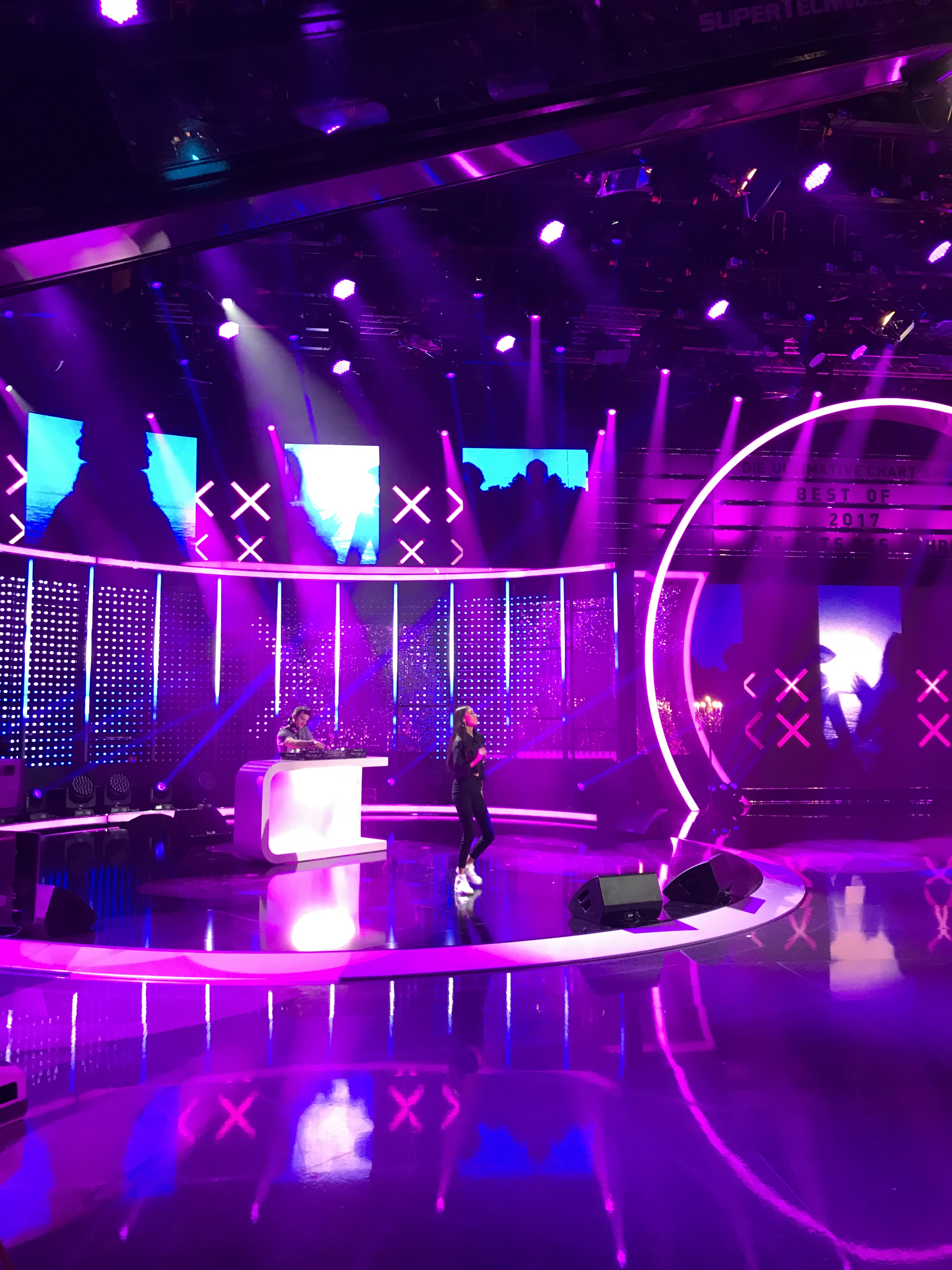
Danelle Sandoval performs live on the popular TV show "Die ultimative Chartshow" in Cologne, Germany in December 2017.

== Discography ==
=== Albums ===
- For Love (2018)

=== Singles ===
- "Love Again" (2019)
- "Chairs" (2018)
- "High Til" (2017)
- "Something" (2017)
- "Straight Up" (2017)
- "Mad About You" (2017)
- "Tuesday" with Burak Yeter (2016)

== Awards and nominations ==
World Dance Music Radio Awards

Year	Category	Nominated work	Result	Ref.
2018	Best Global Track	"Tuesday" (with Burak Yeter)	Nominated	
