= Tony Montana (song) =

2011 single by Future

Single by Future

from the album Pluto and True Story
- Released: April 16, 2011
- Genre: Trap
- Length: 4:05
- Label: A1; Freebandz
- Songwriters: Nayvadius Wilburn; Willie Byrd; Rodney Hill, Jr.
- Producer: Will-A-Fool

Future singles chronology
"Racks" (2011)	"Tony Montana" (2011)	"Go Harder" (2011)

Music video
- "Tony Montana" on YouTube

"Tony Montana" is the debut single by American rapper Future, released on April 16, 2011 as the lead single from his debut studio album Pluto (2012). Written by Future and A1 Recordings label boss Rocko, the song was produced by Will-A-Fool and finds Future comparing himself to the namesake character from the 1983 film Scarface. An official remix of the song featuring Canadian rapper Drake was released on July 6, 2011.

"Tony Montana" is credited for pioneering the microgenre known as mumble rap.

== Background ==
Regarding the song's vocal tone and sound, Future stated in an interview with The Boombox:

It was the energy of the track and what I was going through at the time. It's an aggressive song so that's why I got an aggressive tone. And then just feeding off that "Racks" energy and wanting to come back with another smash hit. That's what really influenced the record. I was trying to be creative and reinvent myself all over again. I wanted to mention something white so I got the "Tony Montana" idea and used it as a metaphor. Nobody had did a song called "Tony Montana."

In an interview with Peter Rosenberg for Complex, Future described the night he recorded the track: "I remember being so fuckin' high on this song, I couldn't even open my mouth. When I listened back to it the next day, I was like man, what the fuck is this? But I loved it. Like, that shit sound raw, though."

== Remixes ==
The official remix of the song features Canadian rapper Drake and was released on July 6, 2011. According to Future, ideas for the collaboration began when he was contacted by Drake while working in the studio and complimented for his mixtapes and styles of rapping. Lil Wayne wanted to collaborate on the remix as well for his mixtape, but Future worked with Drake instead to avoid being overshadowed.

The song has also been remixed by several other rappers, including Meek Mill, French Montana, Tyga, Pusha T and Lil B.

== Music video ==
The music video was directed by Jessy Terrero and was released on October 27, 2011. In it, Future is called by a cartel to track down the culprit in the robbery of a shipment of drugs and travels from his hometown of Atlanta to Santo Domingo for the job. He interacts with the locals, rides on a bike through the "grimy streets," and "cozies up to some Latina hotties."

Drake does not appear in the video. In an interview with MTV, Future expressed disappointment with Drake's decision to skip the video shoot, which drove him to reconsider his decision to collaborate with Drake on the remix.

== Critical reception ==
Critical response to the song was generally mixed; some praised the song's catchiness and production, while others criticized its repetition. A New York Times article dated September 2011 described Future as "[a] rising titan, figuring in two of the year's biggest songs: his single 'Tony Montana,' in which he raps with the world's weakest fake Cuban accent" and further added "[the song and his previous single "Racks"] follow a straightforward pattern, familiar to fans of Atlanta hip-hop: extremely catchy and oft-repeated hook, devil-may-care attitude, jagged and delirious production" and concluded: "Future was all confidence and presence…[he] is a capable if not thrilling rapper, but he's flexible."

== Charts ==
Chart (2011)	Peak position
US Bubbling Under Hot 100 (Billboard)	4
US Hot R&B/Hip-Hop Songs (Billboard)	22
US Hot Rap Songs (Billboard)	18

== Certifications ==
Region	Certification	Certified units/sales
United States (RIAA)	Gold	500,000^{‡}
^{‡} Sales+streaming figures based on certification alone.
