= Cecilia Krull =

Spanish singer

- Born: 29 June 1986 (age 39); Madrid, Spain
- Genres: Dance
- Occupation: Singer
- Years active: 1993–present

Cecilia Krull (born 29 June 1986) is a Spanish singer best known as the singer of "Something's Triggered", the theme song of Three Steps Above Heaven, and "My Life Is Going On", the main theme song of Money Heist.

== Biography ==
Born to a pianist father from France and a singer mother from Spain, Krull's career began at the age of 7 in Disney productions and continued until the age of 14. She reached international popularity in 2017 with the song "My Life Is Going On", the theme from the Netflix TV series Money Heist.

== Selected discography ==
The Spanish singer has often worked with author Manel Santisteban, interpreting the following songs.

=== Singles ===
- "All My Fears", for the film Fuga de Cerebros (2009)
- "Something's Triggered", for the film A tres metros sobre el cielo (2010)
- "My Life Is Going On", the main theme song of Money Heist (2017)
- '"La verdad", for the TV series El accidente (2018)
- "Agnus Dei", the main theme song of Vis a Vis (2019), with Mala Rodríguez
