= Turn On the Lights (song) =

2012 song by Future

Single by Future

from the album Pluto
- Released: April 13, 2012
- Recorded: 2011
- Studio: 11th Street Studios, (Atlanta, Georgia)
- Genre: Trap
- Length: 4:09
- Label: A1; Freebandz; Epic
- Songwriters: Nayvadius Wilburn; Marquel Middlebrooks; Michael Williams
- Producers: Mike Will Made It; Marz

Future singles chronology
"We in This Bitch" (2012)	"Turn On the Lights" (2012)	"We in This Bitch 1.5" (2012)

"Turn On the Lights" is a song by American rapper Future, released on April 13, 2012, as the fourth single (and fifth overall) from his debut studio album Pluto. It peaked at number 50 on the US Billboard Hot 100, number two on the Hot R&B/Hip-Hop Songs chart, and number one on the Top Heatseekers chart, making it the album's most successful single. It is his second highest-selling single as a lead artist. Complex named the song number 14 on their list of the best 50 songs of 2012, and Pitchfork named it number 49 on their list of the top 100 tracks of 2012.

== Commercial performance ==
The song peaked at number 50 on the US Billboard Hot 100 and number two on the US Hot R&B/Hip-Hop Songs charts. In April 2015, the song was certified platinum by the Recording Industry Association of America (RIAA) for sales of over a million digital copies in the United States.

== Charts ==
=== Weekly charts ===
Chart (2012)	Peak position
US Billboard Hot 100	50
US Hot R&B/Hip-Hop Songs (Billboard)	2

=== Year-end charts ===
Chart (2012)	Position
US Hot R&B/Hip-Hop Songs (Billboard)	36
US Hot Rap Songs (Billboard)	27

== Certifications ==
Region	Certification	Certified units/sales
Canada (Music Canada)	Gold	40,000^{‡}
United States (RIAA)	2× Platinum	2,000,000^{‡}
^{‡} Sales+streaming figures based on certification alone.

== "Turn On the Lights Again.." ==
"Turn On the Lights again.."

Single by Fred Again and Swedish House Mafia featuring Future

from the EP USB
- Released: July 29, 2022
- Length: 4:27
- Label: Atlantic Records UK
- Songwriters: Nayvadius Wilburn; Marquel Middlebrooks; Michael Williams
- Producers: Fred Again; Swedish House Mafia

"Turn On the Lights" was remixed by British producer Fred Again and Swedish house music supergroup Swedish House Mafia titled as "Turn On the Lights Again..". It was released as a single on July 29, 2022, and charted in both the UK and Ireland, reaching No. 27 on the UK Singles Chart and No. 23 on the Irish Singles Chart. Clash described the remix as "a fiery return, melding together house, arena-level EDM, and aspects of UK garage", while Pilerats described it as "a dirty, rolling slice of garage inflected house music."

=== Charts ===
==== Weekly charts ====
Weekly chart performance for "Turn On the Lights again.."
Chart (2022–2026)	Peak position
Australia (ARIA)	71
Ireland (IRMA)	23
Sweden (Sverigetopplistan)	60
UK Singles (Official Charts)	27
UK Dance (Official Charts)	12
US Hot Dance/Electronic Songs (Billboard)	16

==== Year-end charts ====
2022 year-end chart performance for "Turn On the Lights again.."
Chart (2022)	Position
US Hot Dance/Electronic Songs (Billboard)	89

=== Certifications ===
Certifications for "Turn On the Lights"
Region	Certification	Certified units/sales
Australia (ARIA)	Gold	35,000^{‡}
Canada (Music Canada)	Platinum	80,000^{‡}
New Zealand (RMNZ)	Platinum	30,000^{‡}
Poland (ZPAV)	Gold	25,000^{‡}
United Kingdom (BPI)	Platinum	600,000^{‡}
^{‡} Sales+streaming figures based on certification alone.
