= Magic (Future song) =

Single by Future

from the album Pluto
- Released: January 23, 2012
- Genre: Trap
- Length: 3:30
- Label: A1; Freebandz; Epic
- Songwriters: Nayvadius Wilburn; Kevin Erondu
- Producer: K.E. on the Track

Future singles chronology
"Go Harder" (2011)	"Magic" (2012)	"We in This Bitch" (2012)

T.I. singles chronology
"Here Ye, Hear Ye" (2011)	"Magic" (2012)	"We in This Bitch" (2012)

Music video
- "Magic" on YouTube

"Magic" is a song by American rapper Future. Produced by K.E. on the Track, it was first released on March 3, 2011. The remix of the song features American rapper T.I. and was released on January 23, 2012 as the second single (and third overall) from Future's debut studio album Pluto (2012). The song's music video was released on January 31, 2012.

== Charts ==
=== Weekly charts ===
Chart (2012)	Peak position
US Billboard Hot 100	69
US Hot R&B/Hip-Hop Songs (Billboard)	10
US Hot Rap Songs (Billboard)	13
US Rhythmic Airplay (Billboard)	26

=== Year-end charts ===
Chart (2012)	Position
US Hot R&B/Hip-Hop Songs (Billboard)	57
