= Ally Brooke discography =

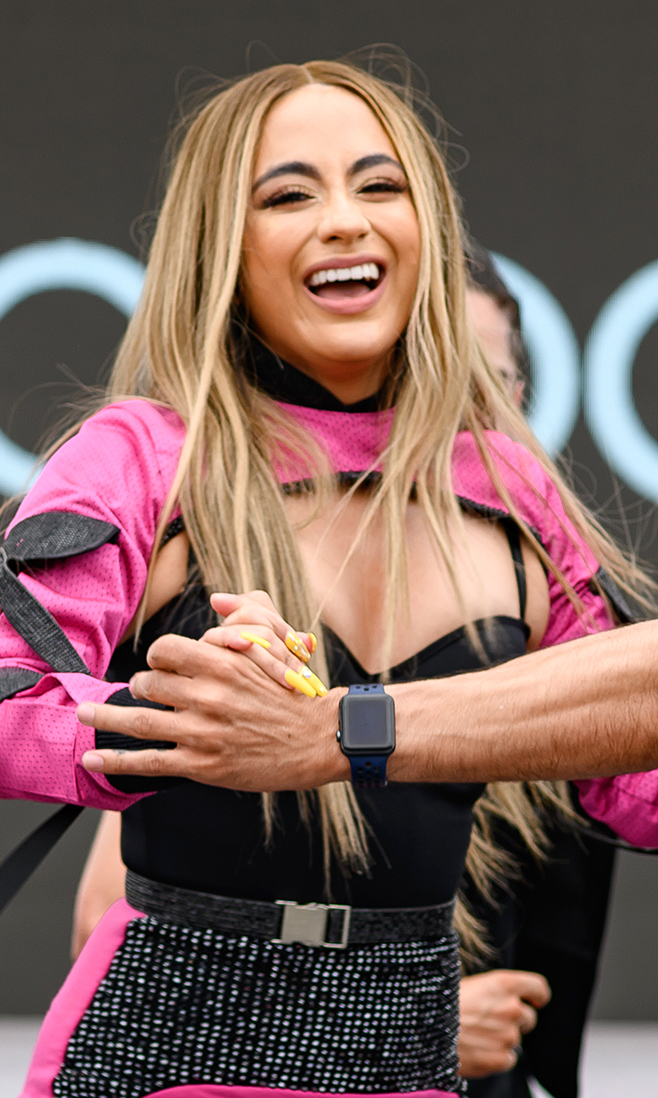
- Brooke performing at Wango Tango in June 2019
- EPs: 1
- Singles: 23
- Music videos: 11
- Promotional singles: 4

American singer Ally Brooke has released one extended play, twenty-three singles (including five as a featured artist), four promotional singles, and eleven music videos. In 2012, Brooke auditioned as a solo artist for the second season of The X Factor. After being eliminated as a solo performer, she was brought back into the competition along with four other girls to form the girl group Fifth Harmony. During her time in the group, Brooke and her bandmates released the albums Reflection (2015), 7/27 (2016), and Fifth Harmony (2017).

In June 2017, Brooke was featured on DJ-duo Lost Kings' song "Look at Us Now" with American rapper ASAP Ferg. In January 2018, Brooke collaborated with German DJ Topic for the song "Perfect". She released the song "Vámonos" in November 2018, a collaboration with Kris Kross Amsterdam and rapper Messiah. In December 2018, she released the song "The Truth Is in There", written by Diane Warren, as part of Weight Watchers International's Wellness That Works campaign.

"Low Key", Brooke's first solo single, was released in January 2019. She released her second single "Lips Don't Lie" in May 2019. The follow-up single, "Higher", with Matoma, was released in September 2019. Her next single "No Good", was released in November 2019. In 2020, Brooke released the singles "Fabulous", "500 Veces" with Messiah, "What Are We Waiting For?" with Afrojack, "Gatekeeper" with Fedde Le Grand, and "Feeling Dynamite" with Joe Stone.

== Extended plays ==
Title	Details
Under the Tree	Released: November 3, 2023; Label: Snafu; Formats: Digital download, streaming

== Singles ==
=== As lead artist ===
Title	Year	Peak chart positions										Album
Title	Year	US Bub.	US Dance	US Pop	AUT	BEL (WA)	CRO	GER	NZ Hot	PHL	ROM	Album
"Perfect" (with Topic)	2018	—	38	73	—	—	—	98	—	—	—	Non-album singles
"Vámonos" (with Kris Kross Amsterdam and Messiah)	2018	—	—	—	32	—	—	—	—	—	—	Non-album singles
"Low Key" (featuring Tyga)	2019	18	—	24	—	17	91	—	39	21	11	Non-album singles
"Lips Don't Lie" (featuring A Boogie wit da Hoodie)	2019	—	—	38	—	35	—	—	—	—	4	Non-album singles
"Higher" (with Matoma)	2019	—	22	—	—	—	—	—	—	—	39	Non-album singles
"No Good"	2019	—	—	—	—	—	—	—	—	—	—	Non-album singles
"Fabulous"	2020	—	—	—	—	—	—	—	—	—	—	Non-album singles
"500 Veces" (with Messiah)	2020	—	—	—	—	—	—	—	—	—	—	Non-album singles
"What Are We Waiting For?" (with Afrojack)	2020	—	—	—	—	—	—	—	—	—	—	Non-album singles
"Gatekeeper" (with Fedde le Grand)	2020	—	—	—	—	—	—	—	—	—	—	Non-album singles
"Baby I'm Coming Home"	2020	—	—	—	—	—	—	—	—	—	—	Non-album singles
"Feeling Dynamite" (with Joe Stone)	2020	—	—	—	—	—	—	—	—	—	—	Non-album singles
"Dance It Off" (with Laidback Luke)	2020	—	—	—	—	—	—	—	—	—	—	Non-album singles
"Mi Música"	2021	—	—	—	—	—	—	—	—	—	—	Non-album singles
"Por Ti"	2022	—	—	—	—	—	—	—	—	—	—	Non-album singles
"Tequila"	2022	—	—	—	—	—	—	—	—	—	—	Non-album singles
"High Fashion Drugs (Remix)" (with Nessly, Dëkay and 1Da Banton)	2023	—	—	—	—	—	—	—	—	—	—	Non-album singles
"Gone to Bed"	2023	—	—	—	—	—	—	—	—	—	—	Non-album singles
"Have Yourself a Merry Little Christmas" (with Dinah Jane)	2023	—	—	—	—	—	—	—	—	—	—	Under the Tree
"Alone with You" (with Jim Brickman)	2024	—	—	—	—	—	—	—	—	—	—	Because You Loved Me: Diane Warren Re-Imagined
"Dignity" (with DJ Buddha)	2026	—	—	—	—	—	—	—	—	—	—	TBA
"Baby Girl"	2026	—	—	—	—	—	—	—	—	—	—	TBA
"—" denotes a recording that did not chart or was not released in that territory.

=== As featured artist ===
Title	Year	Peak chart positions	Album
Title	Year	US Dance	Album
"Look at Us Now" (Lost Kings featuring Ally Brooke and ASAP Ferg)	2017	30	We Are Lost Kings (Japan EP)
"All Night" (Afrojack featuring Ally Brooke)	2020	36	Non-album singles
"Like You Do" (Florian Picasso featuring Ally Brooke and Gashi)	2020	—	Non-album singles
"Yo Estaré" (Santana featuring Ally Brooke)	2022	—	Blessings and Miracles
"La Cita" (Deorro featuring Ally Brooke)	2022	—	Orro
"—" denotes a recording that did not chart or was not released.

=== Promotional singles ===
Title	Year	Album
"Last Christmas"	2018	Non-album promotional singles
"The Truth Is in There"	2018	Non-album promotional singles
"The Casagrandes Theme Song" (with The Casagrandes)	2019	Non-album promotional singles
"High Expectations" (English and Spanish version)	2022	Non-album promotional singles
"Under the Tree"	2023	Under the Tree

== Guest appearances ==
List of songs from other projects, showing year released, other artists and album name
Title	Year	Other artist(s)	Album
"I'm So Happy You Are Here"	2020	Blue's Clues & You	Blue's Sing-Along Spectacular
"Thank You"	2021	Nickelodeon and The Casagrandes	Nickelodeon's Mega Music Fest Album
"Break"	2021	Santana	Blessings and Miracles
"Ella Estuvo Aquí"	2022	Crystal Lewis	Together We Can

== Music videos ==
List of music videos, showing year released and directors
Title	Year	Other artist(s)	Director(s)	Ref.
"Perfect"	2018	Topic	Topic	
"Low Key"	2019	Tyga	Mike Ho	
"Lips Don't Lie"	2019	A Boogie wit da Hoodie	Jake Wilson	
"Higher"	2019	Matoma	Michael Garcia	
"No Good"	2020	None	Michael Garcia	
"500 Veces"	2020	Messiah	Michael Garcia	
"Mi Música"	2021	None		
"Por Ti"	2022	None		
"High Expectations"	2022	None		
"High Expectations" (Spanish version)	2022	None		
"Tequila"	2022	None	Jasper Soloff	
