= Freaky Deaky (song) =

2022 single by Tyga and Doja Cat

Single by Tyga and Doja Cat
- Released: February 25, 2022
- Recorded: c. 2020
- Length: 3:35
- Label: Empire; Kemosabe; Last Kings; RCA
- Songwriters: Michael Stevenson; Amala Dlamini; Alyssa Lourdiz Cantu; Brandon Hamlin; Łukasz Gottwald; Mike Crook; Ryan Ogren; Suzanne Vega
- Producers: B HAM; Dr. Luke; Crook; Ryan OG

Tyga singles chronology
"Mrs. Bubblegum" (2021)	"Freaky Deaky" (2022)	"Sheik Talk" (2022)

Doja Cat singles chronology
"Handstand" (2021)	"Freaky Deaky" (2022)	"Get Into It (Yuh)" (2022)

Music video
- "Freaky Deaky" on YouTube

"Freaky Deaky" is a song by American rappers and singers Tyga and Doja Cat. It was released on February 25, 2022, as the intended lead single of the former's upcoming eighth studio album. Written by the performers alongside Alyssa Cantu and producers Brandon Hamlin, Dr. Luke, Mike Crook, and Ryan Ogren, it is a pop-driven track featuring a lullaby-like hook built around an interpolation of the 1987 song "Tom's Diner" by Suzanne Vega, who received a songwriting credit. The track sees rappers discussing their sexual preferences over a catchy and upbeat tune. Conceived around two years before the release, the single marks the second collaboration between the rappers since 2019, when Tyga was featured on the remix of Doja Cat's "Juicy".

"Freaky Deaky" was met with a positive response from music critics, who praised its catchiness and the chemistry between the artists. It was nominated for The Collaboration Song at the 48th People's Choice Awards. Commercially, it peaked at number 43 on the US Billboard Hot 100 and reached the top 40 in Australia, Hungary, New Zealand, the United Kingdom, and the Global 200 chart. The single topped the Rhythmic Airplay Chart, becoming Tyga's fourth and Doja Cat's seventh number one on the chart. The track has been certified gold in the United States and New Zealand. An accompanying music video directed by Christian Breslauer features Tyga being seduced by a sultrily dressed Doja Cat.

== Background and release ==
Following a commercial and critical fiasco of his sixth studio album Kyoto (2018), Tyga followed it with Legendary (2019), which spawned the US top ten single "Taste" featuring American rapper Offset. Subsequently, the rapper released various buzz singles and was featured in other artists' songs. One of his collaborators was Doja Cat, whom he first met in 2014. He appeared in the remix of her 2019 track "Juicy", which ended up as the lead single of her second studio album Hot Pink (2019). It became Doja Cat's first Billboard Hot 100 entry, peaking at number 41 in February 2020. Around that time, he recorded "Freaky Deaky", which he "immediately" sent to Doja Cat, considering her as the best collaborator choice for it. However, due to the COVID-19 pandemic, the single release was pushed back, with the original music video concept being scrapped. For Apple Music, Tyga told Zane Lowe that he enjoys working with Doja Cat, calling her a "true artist".

On February 21, 2022, Tyga and Doja Cat posted a photo of them together on social media with the caption "Friday", alluding to a possible collaboration. Four days later, "Freaky Deaky" was released for digital download and streaming as the lead single of Tyga's upcoming eighth studio album. Empire Distribution and RCA Records made the song available for airplay on mainstream and rhythmic contemporary panels in the United States on the same day. It later officially impacted these formats on March 8. A remix by Dutch-Moroccan disc jockey R3hab was released exclusively for a digital download on Empire Distribution's online store on April 14. The following day, it was distributed across all music platforms. "Freaky Deaky" was featured on the 83rd volume of Now That's What I Call Music! compilation, released on August 5 through Universal Music Group. A sped-up version of the song was released on December 2. To celebrate the one-year anniversary of the single's release, Empire Distribution and Last Kings Records issued a 7-inch picture disc.

== Composition and reception ==
"Freaky Deaky" has been described as "pop-driven", "marketable hit", and a "club anthem" by music commentary. It contains a "catchy" tune with a calm instrumentation built off a "light guitar strings" and "urban beats". The song begins with a "cheeky" hook sung by Doja Cat, heavily based on the melody of Suzanne Vega's "Tom's Diner", compared to a "breezy lullaby" by Brenton Blanchet of Complex. It is followed by a rap verse by Tyga, in which he describes his sexual preferences. The second verse features an "energetic" performance from Doja Cat, while in the third verse, Tyga nods to their earlier collaboration, the remix of "Juicy", in the line "Forever, forever, ever, juicy, baby".

Dubbed as a "flirtarious" track by Wongo Okon of Uproxx, "Freaky Deaky" was praised by Blanchet, saying it is a "proper collaboration" with "enough vocal flourishes and backing runs". In an article published on Rap-Up, it was opined that both rappers have an "undeniable chemistry". Westdeutscher Rundfunk's Isabel von Glahn compared the single with the rappers' previous collaboration, "Juicy", writing that it is "even sexier". Yohann Rouelle from Pure Charts called the track a "voluptuous and carnal invitation to succumb to your desires". Kaitlyn McNab from Teen Vogue described it as "light", "flirty", "fun", "upbeat and catchy". Another positive review was issued by iHeart's Sean Strife; the author enjoyed the track, saying that "the beat is great, hook is super catchy, Tyga kills it and Doja both sings and raps flawlessly". Jon Powell from Revolt opined that the single is "both perfect for the bedroom and dance floor". XXL listed "Freaky Deaky" as one of the best new songs of the week. R3hab's rendition of the song was called "hot" by Hayley Hynes of HotNewHipHop.

== Commercial performance ==
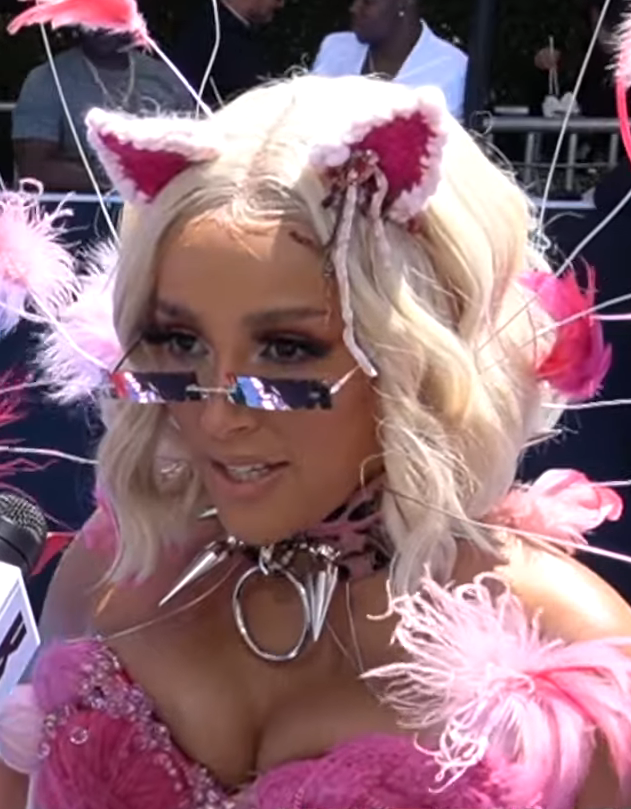
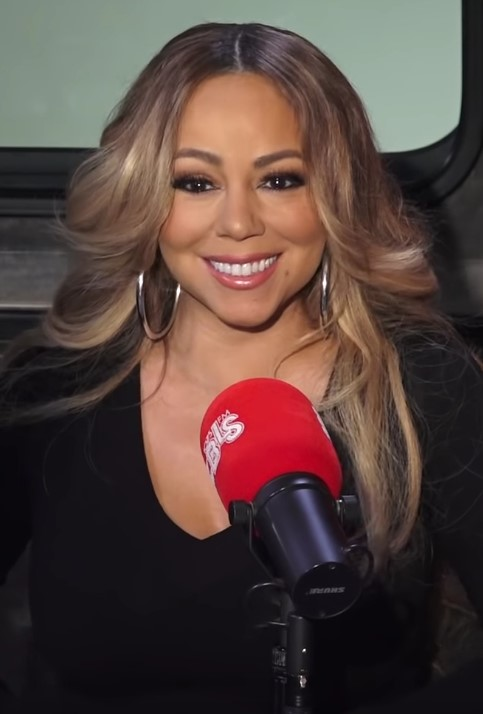
"Freaky Deaky" became Doja Cat's (left) seventh number one on the Rhythmic Airplay Chart, tying her with Mariah Carey (right) for the fifth-most number-one songs on the chart among female musicians.

In the United States, "Freaky Deaky" debuted at its peak of number 43 on the US Billboard Hot 100. It gradually fluctuated on the chart and remained on it for a total of 16 weeks. On chart issue May 7, 2022, Doja Cat ascended to the number one spot on the Artist 100 for the first time, with the help of five of her songs being in circulation on the Hot 100, including "Freaky Deaky" at number 54. The following week, the single topped the Rhythmic Airplay Chart for a week. According to Luminate Data, it was the most-played song on monitored rhythmic radio stations in the US, gaining 16% growth in comparison to the previous week, when it logged number three. "Freaky Deaky" became Tyga's fourth and Doja Cat's seventh number one on the aforementioned chart. Additionally, Doja Cat became the first female artist with three songs charting simultaneously in the survey's top ten. (Note: Other songs by Doja Cat present on the aforementioned chart included "Woman" at number six and "Get Into It (Yuh)" at nine.) The Recording Industry Association of America (RIAA) awarded the single with a platinum certification for 1,000,000 sold units. In Canada, "Freaky Deaky" debuted at number 44 on the Canadian Hot 100, while on the Billboard Global 200 it entered at number 37.

Elsewhere, "Freaky Deaky" peaked at number 36 on the UK Singles Chart, becoming Tyga's eighth and Doja Cat's 11th top 40 entry. It was certified silver in the United Kingdom by British Phonographic Industry (BPI) for selling 200,000 copies. In Australia, the single entered the ARIA Singles Chart at number 29, becoming Tyga's first chart entry since "Haute"―which peaked at number 50 in June 2019. For Doja Cat, it is her third song that became present on the chart this week. (Note: Other songs by Doja Cat present on the aforementioned chart included "Kiss Me More" at number 24 and "Woman" at 28.) The single was certified platinum by Recorded Music NZ (RMNZ) for moving 30,000 copies in New Zealand.

== Music video ==
The still shows Tyga (left) and Doja Cat (right) in plastic packages, inspired by the line "Black Barbie, perfect and you gnarly". The music video director Christian Breslauer said that it reminded him of the 1998 film Small Soldiers.

The Christian Breslauer-directed music video premiered on February 25, 2022, alongside the single release. It was teased one day earlier by Tyga, who posted an 18-second-long snippet of it on his social media. The rapper recalled numerous times that the concept of the clip was changed, since it was initially set to be in a snowy landscape. However, due to the COVID-19 pandemic, the shooting was cancelled. About a year and a half later, he texted Breslauer with a "futuristic" vision for the video instead. It has been described as "colorful", with the most prominent color being rose.

A "flirtatious" video begins with Tyga and Doja Cat exchanging lewd messages and planning their appointment. Later, they both dress up using high-tech machines. The following scene shows Tyga riding through a neon-lit city. As he approaches Doja Cat's flat, he falls through a trap door into her cat-filled lair. Afterwards, the performers are in plastic packaging. Doja Cat wears various sultry lingerie and colorful PVC outfits, while Tyga plays the role of a voyeur. Due to its adult-oriented nature, the video was called "playful" by Erika Marie of HotNewHipHop, while Glahn said it is "almost reminiscent of a sex tape".

== Accolades ==
Accolades for "Freaky Deaky"
Year	Organization	Award	Result	Ref.
2022	People's Choice Awards	The Collaboration Song	Nominated	

== Track listing ==
Digital download / streaming

1. "Freaky Deaky" – 3:35

Digital download / streaming – R3hab remix

1. "Freaky Deaky" (R3hab remix) – 2:20

Digital download / streaming – Sped up version

1. "Freaky Deaky" (Sped Up) – 3:40

7-inch picture disc

1. "Freaky Deaky" (Explicit)
2. "Freaky Deaky" (Clean)

== Credits and personnel ==
- Tyga – songwriting, rap
- Doja Cat – songwriting, vocals
- Alyssa Lourdiz Cantu – songwriting
- Suzanne Vega – songwriting
- Brandon Hamlin – songwriting, production
- Dr. Luke – songwriting, production
- Mike Crook – songwriting, production
- Ryan Ogren – songwriting, production
- Grant Horton – production assistant
- Kalani Thompson – engineering
- Tyler Sheppard – engineering
- John Hanes – mixing
- Serban Ghenea – mixing

== Charts ==
=== Weekly charts ===
Weekly chart performance for "Freaky Deaky"
Chart (2022)	Peak position
Australia (ARIA)	29
Canada Hot 100 (Billboard)	44
Canada CHR/Top 40 (Billboard)	43
Global 200 (Billboard)	37
Hungary (Single Top 40)	31
Ireland (IRMA)	73
New Zealand (Recorded Music NZ)	16
South Africa Streaming (TOSAC)	78
UK Singles (Official Charts)	35
UK Indie (Official Charts)	14
UK Hip Hop/R&B (Official Charts)	12
US Billboard Hot 100	43
US Hot R&B/Hip-Hop Songs (Billboard)	11
US R&B/Hip-Hop Airplay (Billboard)	30
US Pop Airplay (Billboard)	24
US Rhythmic Airplay (Billboard)	1
Vietnam (Vietnam Hot 100)	97

=== Year-end charts ===
2022 year-end chart performance for "Freaky Deaky"
Chart (2022)	Position
US Hot R&B/Hip-Hop Songs (Billboard)	37
US Rhythmic (Billboard)	16

== Certifications ==
Certifications for "Freaky Deaky"
Region	Certification	Certified units/sales
New Zealand (RMNZ)	Platinum	30,000^{‡}
United Kingdom (BPI)	Silver	200,000^{‡}
United States (RIAA)	Platinum	1,000,000^{‡}
^{‡} Sales+streaming figures based on certification alone.

== Release history ==
Release dates and formats for "Freaky Deaky"
Region	Date	Format(s)	Version	Label(s)	Ref.
Various	February 25, 2022	Digital download; streaming	Clean; explicit	Empire; Kemosabe; Last Kings; RCA	
United States	March 8, 2022	Contemporary hit radio; rhythmic contemporary radio	Original	Empire; RCA	
Various	April 14, 2022	Digital download	R3hab remix	Empire	
Various	April 15, 2022	Streaming	R3hab remix	Empire; Kemosabe; Last Kings; RCA	
Various	December 2, 2022	Digital download; streaming	Sped up	Empire; Kemosabe; Last Kings; RCA	
Various	July 28, 2023	7-inch picture disc	Clean; explicit	Empire; Last Kings	
