= Dip (song) =

2018 song by Tyga and Nicki Minaj

- Cover art used for both versions of the song

Single by Tyga featuring Nicki Minaj

from the album Legendary
- Released: September 19, 2018; October 29, 2018 (Nicki Minaj version)
- Genre: Dirty rap
- Length: 2:07; 3:15 (Nicki Minaj version)
- Label: Last Kings; Empire
- Songwriters: Micheal Stevenson; D. A. Doman; Adele Elysee; Onika Maraj
- Producer: D. A. Doman

Tyga singles chronology
"Swap Meet" (2018)	"Dip" (2018)	"Floss In the Bank" (2019)

Nicki Minaj singles chronology
"Woman Like Me" (2018)	"Dip" (2018)	"No Candle No Light" (2018)

Music video
- "Dip" on YouTube

"Dip" is a song recorded by American rapper Tyga for his seventh studio album Legendary (2019). It was released on September 19, 2018, by Last Kings Records and Empire Distribution as the third single from the album. An alternate version of the song featuring rapper Nicki Minaj was released on October 29, 2018, along with an accompanying music video.

== Background and recording ==
Tyga spoke about the making of the track in a 2019 interview with Billboard: “I was in the studio with [Nicki Minaj]. I went to her house, we sat there and she wrote the record. Being there while she was recording reminded me of old Young Money days when we all used to be in the studio together.”

== Music video ==
An accompanying music video for the remix version of the song was released on Tyga's YouTube and Vevo accounts on October 29, 2018. It was directed by Tyga and Arrad for Riveting Entertainment. Tyga said the music video “was inspired heavily” by "Scream" by Michael Jackson and Janet Jackson.

== Commercial performance ==
"Dip" debuted at number 83 on the Billboard Hot 100, becoming the 100th entry on the Hot 100 for Nicki Minaj. Minaj also became the fifth act to do so and the first female artist to achieve this feat. It moved 20 spots to number 63 the following week. On January 22, 2019, Dip was certified Gold By RIAA after selling 500,000 units in the United States of America. The certification is Tyga's third after "Taste" and "Swish", prior to his 2019 album Legendary.

== Track listing ==
Original version
No.	Title	Writer(s)	Producer	Length
1.	"Dip"	Micheal Stevenson; David Doman; Adele Elysee	D. A. Doman	2:07

Alternate version
No.	Title	Writer(s)	Producer	Length
1.	"Dip" (featuring Nicki Minaj)	Stevenson; Doman; Elysee; Onika Maraj	D. A. Doman	3:15

== Credits and personnel ==
Credits adapted from YouTube and BMI.

- Tyga − vocals
- Nicki Minaj − vocals
- D. A. Doman − production
- Christian "CQ" Quinonez − record engineering
- Jaycen Joshua − mixing

== Charts ==
Chart (2018)	Peak position
Canada Hot 100 (Billboard)	51
Greece International Digital Singles (IFPI)	70
Hungary (Single Top 40)	32
Ireland (IRMA)	85
New Zealand Hot Singles (RMNZ)	18
Sweden Heatseeker (Sverigetopplistan)	4
Switzerland (Schweizer Hitparade)	84
UK Singles (Official Charts)	62
US Billboard Hot 100	63
US Hot R&B/Hip-Hop Songs (Billboard)	31
US Rhythmic Airplay (Billboard)	16

== Certifications ==
Region	Certification	Certified units/sales
United Kingdom (BPI)	Silver	200,000^{‡}
United States (RIAA)	Platinum	1,000,000^{‡}
^{‡} Sales+streaming figures based on certification alone.

== Release history ==
Region	Date	Format	Version	Label	Ref.
Various	September 19, 2018	Digital download; streaming	Original	Last Kings Records; Empire Distribution	
Various	October 29, 2018	Digital download; streaming	Alternate	Last Kings Records; Empire Distribution	

Notes

The remix version was originally released as a Tyga song with a Nicki Minaj feature. However, after a few days, it changed to a Collaborative Track, where both artists were considered the main artists. It has since just been Tyga's song featuring Nicki Minaj, however it is counted as a Tyga & Nicki Minaj song on the Billboard Hot 100.
