= Ally Brooke =

American singer (born 1993)

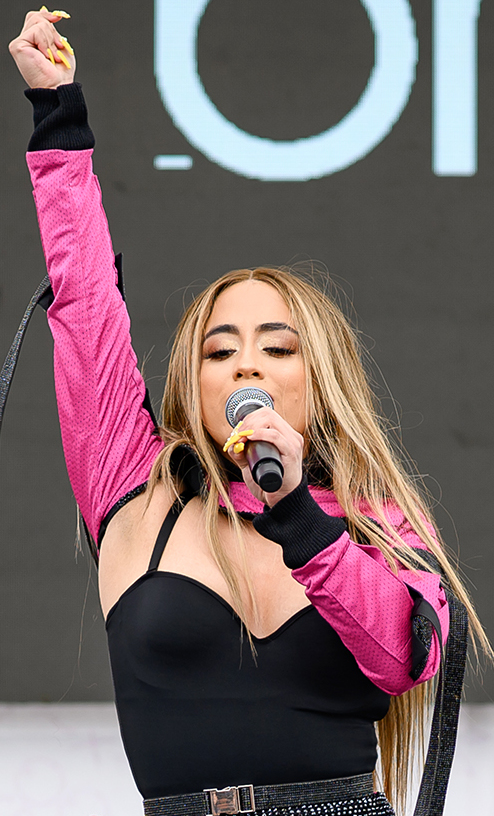
- Brooke in 2019
- Born: Allyson Brooke Hernandez; July 7, 1993 (age 33); San Antonio, Texas, U.S.
- Occupation: Singer
- Years active: 2012–present
- Works: Discography (Note: For her works with Fifth Harmony, see Fifth Harmony discography and List of songs recorded by Fifth Harmony)
- Spouse: Will Bracey (m. 2025)
- Musical career
- Genres: Pop; electronic; R&B; Latin
- Instrument: Vocals
- Labels: Epic; Syco Music; Latium; Atlantic; Snafu
- Formerly of: Fifth Harmony

Allyson Brooke Bracey (née Hernandez; born July 7, 1993) is an American singer. She was a member of the girl group Fifth Harmony from 2012 to 2018. In 2017, Brooke was featured alongside rapper ASAP Ferg on the single "Look at Us Now" by Lost Kings. Afterwards, she released "Perfect" with DJ Topic. Following Fifth Harmony's indefinite hiatus, Brooke signed a record deal with Atlantic, and collaborated on the single "Vámonos", with Kris Kross Amsterdam and Messiah.

Her major label debut single, "Low Key" featuring Tyga, was released in January 2019. Brooke competed in season 28 of Dancing with the Stars, placing third alongside her partner Sasha Farber. Her book Finding Your Harmony was released in 2020. Brooke embarked on the short-lived Time To Shine Tour in early 2020, which was cancelled due to the COVID-19 pandemic. Following several collaborations, her departure from Atlantic, and a short crossover into Latin music, she released the song "Gone to Bed" in September 2023, followed by her Christmas debut extended play (EP) Under the Tree, released on December 1, both under Snafu Records.

== Life and career ==
=== 1993–2011: Early life and career beginnings ===
Allyson Brooke Hernandez was born on July 7, 1993, in San Antonio, Texas, where she was raised by parents Jerry Hernandez and Patricia Castillo. She has an older brother, Brandon. Brooke was a 6-week-premature baby, weighing in at one pound and fourteen ounces when she was born. She is of Mexican descent but did not grow up speaking Spanish, as her parents decided to prevent her from being discriminated against in school. Brooke attended Cornerstone Christian Schools for her elementary education in San Antonio, and completed her high school education through home-schooling.

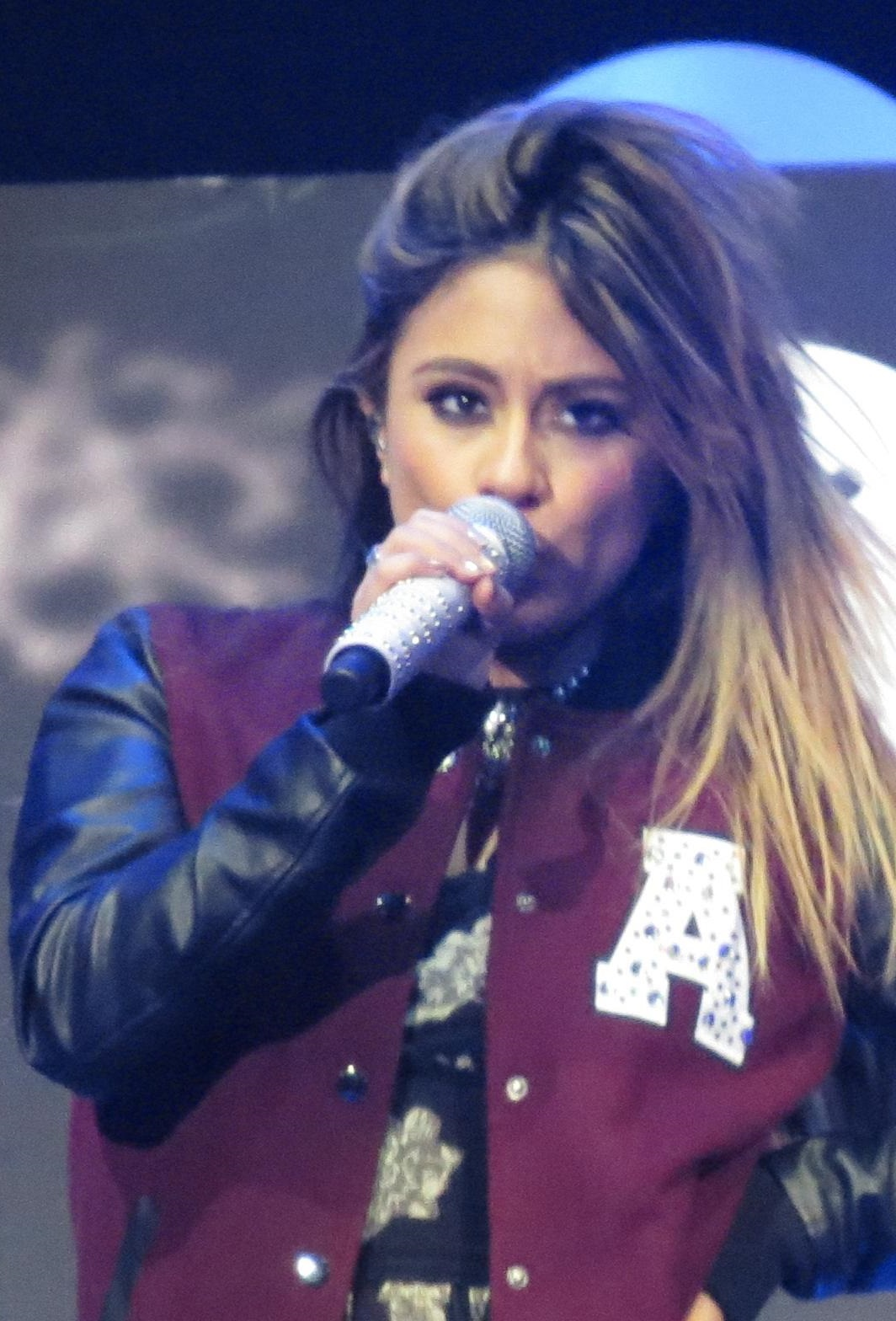
Brooke in 2013

=== 2012–2018: The X Factor and Fifth Harmony ===
Brooke auditioned for The X Factor in Austin, Texas, not far from her hometown in San Antonio, singing "On My Knees" from contemporary Christian and Latin pop singer Jaci Velasquez. For her bootcamp round she sang against Julia Bullock singing "Knockin' on Heaven's Door". She was eliminated during the bootcamp round of competition, but was brought back along with Dinah Jane, Normani Hamilton, Lauren Jauregui, and Camila Cabello to form the group now known as Fifth Harmony. The group advanced to the live shows and managed to finish in third place. Her grandfather died during the week 4 performance of "Stronger (What Doesn't Kill You)" by Kelly Clarkson.

After the finale of The X Factor, Fifth Harmony was signed to Syco Music and Epic Records. The group released their first extended play (EP), Better Together in 2013, along with the albums Reflection in 2015 and 7/27 in 2016. They released their self-titled third studio album Fifth Harmony on August 25, 2017. On March 19, 2018, the group announced an indefinite hiatus to focus on solo projects.

=== 2017–2020: Solo projects and Finding Your Harmony memoir ===
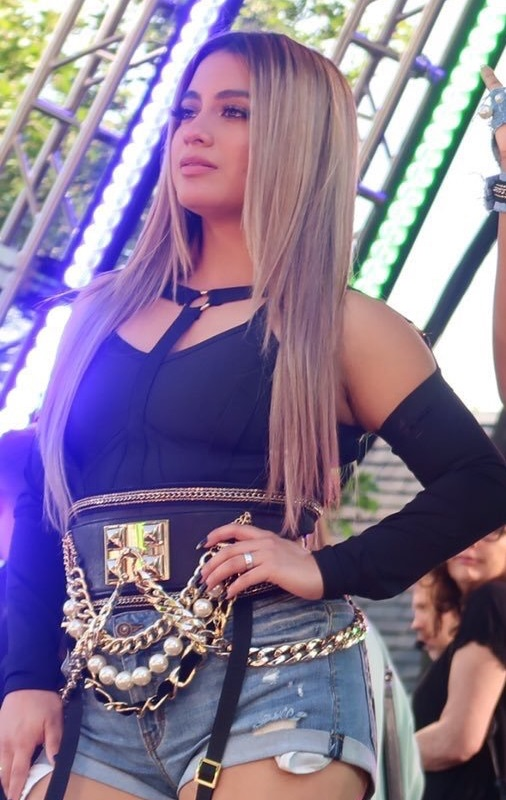
Brooke in 2017

Brooke's first solo project was a feat on American DJ-duo Lost Kings song "Look at Us Now" along with American rapper ASAP Ferg. The song was released on June 9, 2017. In July, she was set to perform a solo show in São Paulo, but the show was cancelled. Brooke joined Plácido Domingo to sing two songs on January 24, 2018, at the Convention Center's Lila Cockrell Theatre in San Antonio, Texas. Brooke collaborated with German DJ Topic for the song "Perfect", released on January 26, along with its music video. She performed the song during an episode of Wild 'n Out in March.

In early 2018, Brooke joined the other members of Fifth Harmony in an episode of Lip Sync Battle, performing a medley of songs by Selena and Jennifer Lopez. In March, she sang a medley of songs from Oscar-winning films such as "Beauty and the Beast" and "My Heart Will Go On" during the E! News broadcast of the red carpet pre-show of the 90th Academy Awards. On March 12, Brooke signed with Maverick Entertainment as a solo artist. She appeared in an episode of season 2 of Famous in Love as herself.

In April, Brooke confirmed she was working on her debut solo studio album, with producers 1500 or Nothin'. In August, it was announced that she signed a record deal with Latium Entertainment and Atlantic Records. The company also announced that Brooke would release her debut solo single later in the fall. She debuted a new, Spanish-language song called "Vámonos" at the Fusion Festival in Liverpool, England on September 2. The song was released on November 23, as a collaboration with Dutch DJ trio Kris Kross Amsterdam and Messiah; she also performed the song prior to its official release at the 2018 ALMA Awards. Brooke released a cover of "Last Christmas" by Wham! on November 16, and performed it at the Macy's Thanksgiving Day Parade. She then announced her memoir, Finding Your Harmony, which was set to hit bookshelves in April 2019. On December 21, Brooke released a song called "The Truth Is In There", written by Diane Warren, as part of Weight Watchers International's Wellness That Works campaign.

"Low Key", Brooke's official debut solo single, featuring rapper Tyga, was released on January 31, 2019. In May 2019, she released the single "Lips Don't Lie" featuring rapper A Boogie wit da Hoodie. In July, Brooke said the goal was to release her debut album in spring of 2020.

In September, Brooke performed the opening theme song to Nickelodeon's The Casagrandes, a spin-off of The Loud House in which she also plays the fictional popstar Alisa Barela. She released the song and music video for the single "Higher" with Matoma that same month. From September to November, Brooke competed on the 28th season of Dancing with the Stars, finishing in third place. Brooke danced to her own song "Higher" while on the show, after which she received her first perfect score from the judges. In November, Brooke released the single "No Good". On December 8, she opened the Miss Universe beauty pageant, performing a medley of her singles and a Selena tribute with "I Could Fall in Love" and "Dreaming of You".

In January 2020, she announced her Time To Shine Tour on social media with shows in North America, which kicked off on March 6, in Chicago, Illinois at the House of Blues. However, due to the COVID-19 pandemic, the tour was postponed and eventually cancelled. On February 21, Dutch producer Afrojack released the single "All Night", featuring Brooke as the song's vocalist. A week later, on February 28, Brooke released the promotional single "Fabulous" alongside only a lyric video on YouTube. On April 3, she was featured along with rapper Gashi on Florian Picasso's song "Like You Do".

In May, Brooke revealed the cover of her upcoming memoir, Finding Your Harmony. On July 17, Brooke released her first Spanglish single "500 Veces", with Dominican rapper Messiah, featuring Latin trap beats. In August, Brooke stated she wants to release an album in the future but is taking her time, and that it could be released in 2021. Finding Your Harmony was released on October 13. The memoir covers aspects of her life, including her childhood and her rise as a solo artist. She collaborated once more with Afrojack in her own single, "What Are We Waiting For?", released on October 16. The week after, on the 23rd, Dutch DJ Fedde Le Grand released the song "Gatekeeper" with Brooke. On October 29, Brooke released her first original Christmas single "Baby I'm Coming Home". On November 13, Joe Stone released "Feeling Dynamite" with Brooke. She featured on Laidback Luke's song "Dance It Off", released on December 4. Brooke was cast in the film High Expectations, playing the role of "Sofia".

=== 2021–2022: New labels and unreleased Spanish album ===
In August 2021, Brooke signed a joint record deal with indie labels Duars Entertainment and AMSI, becoming the first female artist signed to either company. She was featured on the song "Break" by the band Santana, which was included on their album Blessings and Miracles released on October 15.

In October 2021, Brooke spoke to magazine ¡Hola! about her debut album, revealing that it would be an entirely Spanish-language album. She then teased the single "Mi Música" (Eng. "My Music"), her first fully Spanish solo song, on Twitter, set to be released on October 22, with the teaser "Out of the darkness and into the light". Brooke released "Mi Música" as the lead single from her debut solo album of the same name, alongside its music video.

On January 28, 2022, Brooke released the song "Por Ti" (Eng. "For You"), along with its music video, as the second single from the album. On March 15, she released "High Expectations", the theme song from the upcoming film. "Tequila", the third single from the album, was released on March 24. She featured on the song "Ella Estuvo Aqui", by American singer Crystal Lewis, a Spanish-language cover version of Lewis's own "She Was Here", which featured singer Tori Kelly. American DJ Deorro released the song "La Cita" (Eng. "The Date"), featuring Brooke, as part of his album Orro. She appeared on the song "High Fashion Drugs (Remix)", with American rapper Nessly, producer Dekay, and recording artist 1Da Banton.

=== 2023–present: Collaborations and Under the Tree ===
Brooke released the single "Gone to Bed" on September 29, 2023, as her first release under a new deal with Snafu Records. The song marked a return to pop music for Brooke after experimenting with other genres for several years.

On December 1, 2023, Brooke released her holiday extended play Under the Tree. Included on the EP's reissue was a new version of "Have Yourself a Merry Little Christmas" with her Fifth Harmony bandmate Dinah Jane. The song marked the first musical collaboration between any members of the girlband since their 2018 hiatus. The duo performed the song together on The Kelly Clarkson Show on December 21, 2023.

Brooke released the collaboration "Alone with You" with Jim Brickman on February 9, 2024. Written by Diane Warren, the song served as the second single from Brickman's album Because You Loved Me: Diane Warren Re-Imagined.

== Personal life ==
Brooke is a Christian and had stated that she would remain a virgin until marriage. In 2018, Brooke said that she had a Spanish tutor.

Brooke has cited Selena, Gloria Estefan, Bruno Mars, Justin Timberlake, Jennifer Lopez, Shakira, Beyoncé, Whitney Houston, Mariah Carey, Lady Gaga, Adele, and Celine Dion as her greatest influences.

On December 18, 2023, Brooke and her longtime boyfriend Will Bracey got engaged in New York City. Bracey proposed at a New York City art gallery night with a ring designed in Turkey by a private jeweler, according to a press release. The couple were married on May 3, 2025.

== Philanthropy ==
With Fifth Harmony, Brooke was involved with charities DoSomething and the Ryan Seacrest Foundation. She has also participated in activities by the ASPCA. Brooke is the Celebrity Ambassador for March of Dimes, a nonprofit organization working to prevent premature birth, birth defects and infant mortality. In December 2016, she took part in a toy drive in her hometown, San Antonio, benefiting children at local hospitals.

== Discography ==
Extended play (EP)

- Under the Tree (2023)

== Filmography ==
Year	Name	Role	Notes
2012–2013	The X Factor U.S.	Herself	22 episodes (2012); Guest: 1 episode (2013)
2014	Faking It	Herself	Episode: "The Ecstasy and the Agony"
2015	Barbie: Life in the Dreamhouse	Herself	Episode: "Sisters' Fun Day"
2015	Taylor Swift: The 1989 World Tour Live	Herself	Concert film
2016	The Ride	Herself	Episode: "Fifth Harmony"
2018	Lip Sync Battle	Herself	Episode: "Fifth Harmony"
2018	Wild 'n Out	Herself	Episode: "International Women's Day Special"
2018	Famous in Love	Herself	Episode: "Totes on a Scandal"
2018	Sugar	Herself	1 episode
2019	Ridiculousness	Herself	Episode: "Ally Brooke"
2019	Dancing with the Stars	Herself	Contestant (season 28)
2020	The Casagrandes	Alisa (voice)	2 episodes / Also sings series theme song
2020	Blue's Clues & You!	Herself	Episode: "Bluestock"
2020	Nickelodeon's Unfiltered	Herself	Episode: "Honey Bears Chew Gumballs!"
2022	High Expectations	Sofia	Film debut
2024	The Baxters	Ally (Artist)	1 episode
2024	The Surreal Life	Herself	Main cast; season 8

== Awards and nominations ==
Award	Year (Note: Indicates the year of ceremony. Each year is linked to the article about the awards held that year, wherever possible.)	Recipient(s) and nominee(s)	Category	Result	Ref.
BMI London Awards	2017	"All in My Head (Flex)" (Note: The award was presented to each member of Fifth Harmony individually.)	Winning Song	Won	
BMI Pop Awards	2018	"All in My Head (Flex)"	Winning Song	Won	
iHeartRadio Music Awards	2019	Herself	Best Solo Breakout	Nominated	
Teen Choice Awards	2018	"Perfect" (with Topic)	Choice Song: Electronic/Dance	Nominated	

== Tours ==
Headlining

- Time to Shine Tour (2020; cancelled)
