= Red Light Green Light (disambiguation) =

Red Light Green Light, or Statues, is a children's game.

Red Light Green Light may also refer to:

== Television ==
- "Red Light, Green Light" (Squid Game), a 2021 television episode

== Music ==
- "Red Light Green Light" (song) by DaBaby, 2021
- "Red Light Green Light", a song by Digga D, 2021
- "Red Light Green Light", a song by Duke Dumont, 2019
- "Red Light-Green Light", a song by Limp Bizkit featuring Snoop Dogg from Results May Vary, 2003
- "Red Light Green Light", a song by OneRepublic from Artificial Paradise, 2024
- "Red Light - Green Light", a song by the Wildhearts, 1996
- Redlight, Greenlight, an EP by Black Sheep, 2002
