= East Coast (ASAP Ferg song) =

Single by ASAP Ferg featuring Remy Ma
- Released: April 7, 2017
- Genre: Hip hop
- Length: 4:20
- Label: RCA
- Songwriters: Darold Ferguson, Jr.; Khalil Abdul-Rahman; Remy Smith; Sam Barsh; Daniel Seeff; Altariq Crapps
- Producers: DJ Khalil; Tariq Beats

ASAP Ferg singles chronology
"Don't Mind" (2016)	"East Coast" (2017)	"Look at Us Now" (2017)

Remy Ma singles chronology
"You" (2017)	"East Coast" (2017)	"Heartbreak" (2017)

Music video
- "East Coast" on YouTube

"East Coast" is a hip-hop song by American rapper ASAP Ferg. It was released as a single on April 7, 2017, by RCA Records. The track was produced by DJ Khalil and features a guest appearance by American rapper Remy Ma. Originally meant as the lead single from Ferg's third studio album, Still Striving, the song was excluded from the final track listing, as only the remix was included instead.

== Music video ==
The music video for "East Coast" directed by ASAP Ferg and Shomi Patwari was released on May 2, 2017 on ASAP Ferg's Vevo account. It features cameo appearances from ASAP Rocky, French Montana, Flatbush Zombies and Rick Ross.

In an interview with Billboard ASAP Ferg said: "As far as creating the song and the visual, I just feel like I wanted to bring the New York energy back – bring it back to the fun videos and creativity and innovation".

He also spoke about working with Remy Ma for the music video: "It's so dope working with Remy Ma because she's a dope and funny individual and she's so professional. Getting into the studio with her, in the booth – I know why Big Pun wanted to make her his protege and invest in her coming up in the game. She's just an amazing person, and I feel like there was nobody else better to kick this new song off with."

== Remixes ==
The official remix was released on August 4, 2017 and features additional verses from Busta Rhymes, ASAP Rocky, Dave East, French Montana, Rick Ross and Snoop Dogg. Only the remix of this song was included in the mixtape however. The remix version is featured in EA Sports UFC 3.
