= Taste (Tyga song) =

Single by Tyga featuring Offset

from the album Legendary
- Released: May 16, 2018
- Recorded: 2018
- Genre: Hip-hop
- Length: 3:52
- Label: Last Kings; Empire
- Songwriters: Micheal Stevenson; Kiari Cephus; David Doman; Cameron Forbes Lewis
- Producer: D.A. Got That Dope

Tyga singles chronology
"Temperature" (2017)	"Taste" (2018)	"Kream" (2018)

Offset singles chronology
"Wait" (2018)	"Taste" (2018)	"Who Want the Smoke?" (2018)

Music video
- "Taste" on YouTube

"Taste" is a song by the American rapper Tyga featuring Offset. It was released on May 16, 2018, by Last Kings Music and Empire Distribution as the lead single from Tyga's seventh album, Legendary (2019). The song is about wealth, luxury, women and sexual bravado.

"Taste" became a major commercial comeback for Tyga following a period of poor commercial performance. It peaked at number eight on the Billboard Hot 100, becoming his first entry on the chart as a lead artist since 2015 and his second-highest-charting single behind "Rack City". The song also reached the top ten in Canada, New Zealand, Sweden and the United Kingdom. In December 2018, Billboard named "Taste" the 20th-best song of the year. On September 25, 2024, the song was certified Diamond by the Recording Industry Association of America (RIAA), having accumulated ten million certified units, becoming the first Diamond-certified single for both Tyga and Offset.

== Background ==
According to Tyga, "Taste" was recorded during a studio session that lasted approximately 30 minutes in a party environment. Producer D.A. Got That Dope had originally sent Tyga a "real slow" beat, which Tyga decided to speed up. He then began freestyling over the modified instrumental, with the first four bars of the song developing from the freestyle. D.A. Got That Dope later said that Tyga had freestyled the entire three-minute song, after which he selected and rearranged portions of Tyga's flow to make the record "more like a song and more catchy". He recalled that the initial version consisted primarily of the hook and instrumental and said he immediately believed the record was a potential hit.

Offset was not originally featured on the song. Tyga contacted him the day before the first music-video shoot asking him to be a feature on the song. Offset subsequently sent his verse after the initial shoot in Los Angeles. Tyga then travelled to Atlanta, where the pair filmed additional footage at a skating rink.

== Composition ==
"Taste" is a hip hop song produced by D.A. Got That Dope. Alphonse Pierre of Pitchfork described D.A. Got That Dope's production on "Taste" and "Swish" as a sonic sequel to DJ Mustard's production style on Tyga's earlier music.

== Critical reception ==
"Taste" received a positive response from music critics, with praise directed toward its production and catchiness. Billboard ranked it at number 20 on its list of the best songs of 2018. Complex included it on its list of the best songs of 2018, ranking it at number 12. They praised its pitched vocal sample and D.A. Doman's production, calling it "the foundation for one of the catchiest songs of 2018", while noting that, despite Tyga continuing to rely on familiar lyrical themes, the production made the formula effective. HotNewHipHop placed it at number 10 on its list of the 50 hottest hip-hop songs of 2018, saying the record helped establish Tyga's new sound and contributed to his commercial comeback. Soho House described the song's production as an "earworm sample over a bassline made for car speakers and the club". Alphonse Pierre of Pitchfork discussed "Taste" more broadly as part of Tyga's 2018 commercial comeback. Although critical of Tyga's career and persona, Pierre praised "Taste" and "Swish" as two records he "hate[d] to love".

== Music video ==
The music video for "Taste" was released on May 16, 2018, simultaneously with the single. It was directed by Tyga and Arrad and features cameo appearances from 2 Chainz, Wiz Khalifa, Joyner Lucas, YK Osiris, Ronny J and King Bach.

The video depicts Tyga and Offset at a lavish mansion party surrounded by women in swimsuits. Additional scenes show Tyga driving a convertible Mercedes-Benz before arriving at the mansion, while later footage shows Tyga and Offset at Atlanta's Cascade skating rink, accompanied by the women from the party.

By 2020, the music video had accumulated one billion views on YouTube, becoming one of Tyga's most viewed music videos.

== Commercial performance ==
In the United States, "Taste" debuted at number 82 on the Billboard Hot 100 and subsequently peaked at number eight. The song became Tyga's first Hot 100 entry as a lead artist since "Ride Out" in 2015. Billboard described "Taste" as a major career resurgence for Tyga. At the time of its release, his previous studio album, Kyoto (2018), had failed to chart on the Billboard 200, while BitchImTheShit2 (2017) had peaked at number 139 on the chart. "Taste" also became a significant international hit, reaching number five in the United Kingdom, number four in New Zealand, number nine in Canada and number seven in Sweden. It reached number one on the UK Independent Singles Chart and the Billboard Rhythmic chart.

On September 25, 2024, the RIAA certified "Taste" Diamond, representing ten million certified units in the United States. The certification was the first Diamond record for both Tyga and Offset.

== Track listing ==
- Digital download
1. "Taste" (featuring Offset) – 3:52
- 7" vinyl
1. "Taste" (featuring Offset) – 3:52
2. "Swish" – 3:15

== Charts ==
=== Weekly charts ===
Chart (2018–2019)	Peak position
Austria (Ö3 Austria Top 40)	21
Belgium (Ultratip Bubbling Under Flanders)	1
Belgium (Ultratip Bubbling Under Wallonia)	7
Canada Hot 100 (Billboard)	9
Czech Republic Singles Digital (ČNS IFPI)	24
Denmark (Tracklisten)	11
Finland (Suomen virallinen lista)	19
France (SNEP)	89
Hungary (Single Top 40)	30
Hungary (Stream Top 40)	16
Ireland (IRMA)	14
Italy (FIMI)	72
Netherlands (Single Top 100)	27
New Zealand (Recorded Music NZ)	4
Norway (VG-lista)	15
Romania (Airplay 100)	99
Scottish Singles Sales (Official Charts)	24
Slovakia Singles Digital (ČNS IFPI)	15
Spain (PROMUSICAE)	92
Sweden (Sverigetopplistan)	7
Switzerland (Schweizer Hitparade)	18
UK Singles (Official Charts)	5
UK Indie (Official Charts)	1
US Billboard Hot 100	8
US Hot R&B/Hip-Hop Songs (Billboard)	7
US Pop Airplay (Billboard)	24
US Dance Airplay (Billboard)	31
US Rhythmic Airplay (Billboard)	1

=== Year-end charts ===
Chart (2018)	Position
Austria (Ö3 Austria Top 40)	63
Canada (Canadian Hot 100)	30
Denmark (Tracklisten)	38
Netherlands (Single Top 100)	88
New Zealand (Recorded Music NZ)	25
Sweden (Sverigetopplistan)	32
Switzerland (Schweizer Hitparade)	40
UK Singles (OCC)	40
US Billboard Hot 100	28
US Hot R&B/Hip-Hop Songs (Billboard)	14
US Rhythmic (Billboard)	7

Chart (2019)	Position
UK Singles (OCC)	92
US Rolling Stone Top 100	86

== Certifications ==
Region	Certification	Certified units/sales
Denmark (IFPI Danmark)	2× Platinum	180,000^{‡}
France (SNEP)	Gold	100,000^{‡}
Italy (FIMI)	Platinum	50,000^{‡}
New Zealand (RMNZ)	5× Platinum	150,000^{‡}
Spain (Promusicae)	Platinum	60,000^{‡}
United Kingdom (BPI)	3× Platinum	1,800,000^{‡}
United States (RIAA)	Diamond	10,000,000^{‡}
^{‡} Sales+streaming figures based on certification alone.

== See also ==
- List of highest-certified digital singles in the United States
