= Girls Have Fun =

2019 single by American rapper Tyga

Single by Tyga featuring G-Eazy and Rich the Kid

from the album Legendary
- Released: January 23, 2019
- Genre: Hip hop
- Length: 2:55
- Label: Last Kings; Empire
- Songwriters: Micheal Stevenson; William Girgahcine; Gerald Gillum; Dimitri Roger
- Producer: DJ Snake

Tyga singles chronology
"Floss In The Bank" (2019)	"Girls Have Fun" (2019)	"Low Key" (2019)

G-Eazy singles chronology
"Endless Summer Freestyle" (2018)	"Girls Have Fun" (2019)	"West Coast" (2019)

Rich the Kid singles chronology
"Splashin" (2018)	"Girls Have Fun" (2019)	"4 Phones" (2019)

"Girls Have Fun" is a song by American rapper Tyga featuring rappers G-Eazy and Rich the Kid. It was released on January 23, 2019, by Last Kings Music and Empire Distribution as the fifth single from Tyga's seventh studio album Legendary.

== Background ==
"Girls Have Fun" is Tyga's second single of 2019, following the release of "Floss In The Bank" less than two weeks prior.

== Charts ==
Chart (2019)	Peak position
Australia (ARIA)	97
Canada (Canadian Hot 100)	95
New Zealand Hot Singles (RMNZ)	10
US R&B/Hip-Hop Airplay (Billboard)	32
US Rhythmic Airplay (Billboard)	12

== Certifications ==
Region	Certification	Certified units/sales
New Zealand (RMNZ)	Gold	15,000^{‡}
United States (RIAA)	Gold	500,000^{‡}
^{‡} Sales+streaming figures based on certification alone.
