= Tali Goya =

Dominican Latin trap rapper

- Also known as: El Rey del Norte; El Tigre; Goya; Tali
- Born: September 28, 1990 (age 35); Dominican Republic
- Genres: Latin trap; Latin hip hop
- Occupations: Rapper
- Instruments: Vocals
- Label: Tiger Gang

Juan Miguel Villar, known as Tali Goya, or simply Goya is a Dominican Republic Latin trap rapper raised in New York City. He was influenced by artist such as Jay-Z, Eminem and 50 Cent, as well as gangsta rap.

== Career ==
He has been dubbed as one of the primary exponents of hip hop in Latin America. Some of his most successful songs are "Papi Goya", "Rico", "Whip It", "El Derecho", and "Gozza Gozza", which has received over one million views on YouTube. He has collaborated with artists such as Bad Bunny, Arcángel, Fetty Wap, Remyboy Monty, Duki, Khea, Cazzu, Neo Pistea, and others. He garnered attention of the urban music community with his song "Flow Cabrón" with Arcángel.

He started out as a member of the duo Tali & Messiah with fellow New York rapper Messiah.
