= Vámonos =

Single by Kris Kross Amsterdam, Ally Brooke and Messiah
- Language: Spanish
- English title: "Let's Go"
- Released: 23 November 2018
- Genre: Latin pop
- Length: 2:56
- Label: Spinnin'
- Songwriters: Allyson Brooke Hernandez; Jordy Huisman; Sander Huisman; Boaz de Jong; Omar Tavarez; Joren van der Voort; Robin P. Francesco; Laura Carvajalino Avila; Benito Emmanuel Garcia; Joseph Thomas Burns-Huett; Thomas Falkner
- Producers: Kris Kross Amsterdam; Van Dalen; De Jong; Van der Voort; Francesco; Falkner

Ally Brooke singles chronology
"Perfect" (2018)	"Vámonos" (2018)	"Low Key" (2019)

"Vámonos" is a song recorded by Dutch DJ trio Kris Kross Amsterdam, American singer Ally Brooke, and Dominican rapper Messiah. It was released on 23 November 2018.

== Background ==
"Vámonos" is a Latin pop song featuring artists Ally Brooke and Messiah. A lyric video for the song was released on 23 November 2018. It is sung in Spanish and has a heavy up beat dance theme to it. The song was released through Latium Entertainment and Atlantic Records. Brooke performed the song alone prior to its release at the 2018 ALMA Awards.

== Track listing ==
Digital download

1. "Vámonos" – 2:56

The Remixes

1. "Vámonos" (Curbi Remix) – 2:24
2. "Vámonos" (LNY TNZ Remix) – 3:08
3. "Vámonos" – 2:56

== Charts ==
Chart (2018–19)	Peak position
Belgium Dance (Ultratop Flanders)	22
Belgium (Ultratop 50 Wallonia)	32
Belgium Dance (Ultratop Wallonia)	3
Netherlands (Tipparade)	21
