= Perfect (Topic and Ally Brooke song) =

Single by Topic and Ally Brooke
- Released: January 26, 2018
- Length: 3:25
- Label: B1
- Songwriter(s): Matt Radosevich; Noonie Bao; Sasha Sloan
- Producer(s): Topic

Topic singles chronology
"Break My Habits" (2017)	"Perfect" (2018)	"Sólo Contigo" (2018)

Ally Brooke singles chronology
"Look at Us Now" (2017)	"Perfect" (2018)	"Vámonos" (2018)

Music video
- "Perfect" on YouTube

"Perfect" is a single by German DJ Topic and American singer Ally Brooke, released on 26 January 2018 via Ultra Records. The song is Brooke's first solo single as lead artist, following an appearance as a featured artist on Lost Kings' 2017 single "Look at Us Now" alongside A$AP Ferg. A music video for the song accompanied the single's release, on 26 January 2018, and has been viewed over 2.5 million times.

== Background and release ==
Brooke announced the release of the song on 22 January 2018 via social media, writing to Twitter: "I am ecstatic to share with my friends that Topic and I have a song coming out Friday. This one is very special to me."

== Music video ==
The song's music video was released to YouTube on 26 January 2018, the same day as the single's release. The video features Topic and Brooke performing together by a piano (a shot from this scene is included as the single's cover art) and Brooke exploring a large house, interacting specifically with windows and mirrors. At the end of the video, a second Brooke emerges from a mirror and embraces the first.

== Critical reception ==
The single received mostly positive reviews from critics. Nicholas Rice, writing for Billboard, called the song a "radio-friendly pop tune" and "another jam" from Brooke. Meanwhile, Erica Russell of PopCrush wrote that the song is an "empowering track" and a "bright mid-tempo pop anthem".

== Accolades ==
Award	Year	Category	Result	Ref.
Teen Choice Awards	2018	Choice Song: Electronic/Dance	Nominated	

== Commercial performance ==
Despite not achieving any major positions on any Billboard charts, "Perfect" attained minor chart positions in two European countries – Germany (Topic's native country) and Austria.

== Charts ==
Chart (2018)	Peak position
Austria (Ö3 Austria Top 40)	73
Germany (GfK)	98
US Hot Dance/Electronic Songs (Billboard)	38
