= PTSD (disambiguation) =

PTSD, or post-traumatic stress disorder, is a mental disorder associated with trauma.

- Complex post-traumatic stress disorder (C-PTSD)

PTSD may also refer to:

== Music ==
- PTSD (Dax song), 2021
- PTSD (Pharoahe Monch album), or PTSD: Post-Traumatic Stress Disorder, 2014
- PTSD (G Herbo album), 2020
  - "PTSD" (G Herbo song), 2020
- PTSD, an album by L.S. Underground, 2010
- "PTSD", a song by Dreamville and Omen featuring Mereba, Deante' Hitchcock and St. Beauty from Revenge of the Dreamers III
- "PTSD", a song by Pop Smoke from the mixtape Meet the Woo
- "PTSD", a song by JPEGMafia from the album All My Heroes Are Cornballs
