= Ball If I Want To =

2021 single by DaBaby

Single by DaBaby
- Released: June 18, 2021
- Length: 1:52
- Label: South Coast Music Group; Interscope
- Songwriters: Jonathan Kirk; David Doman
- Producer: D.A. Got That Dope

DaBaby singles chronology
| "Skat" (2021) | "Ball If I Want To" (2021) | "Red Light Green Light" (2021) |

Music video
- "Ball If I Want To" on YouTube

"Ball If I Want To" is a song by American rapper DaBaby, released on June 18, 2021, with an accompanying music video. It was produced by D.A. Got That Dope.

== Background ==
The song was first previewed in a promotional video of DaBaby's performances at the Hard Rock Stadium on May 28 and 29, 2021. On June 17, he announced a "big surprise" at midnight in an Instagram video, before releasing the song.

== Composition ==
On the track, DaBaby talks about doing what he wants; in the chorus, he raps: "Bitch, it ain't even my birthday but I can ball if I want to (Ball) / Pull up, foreign cars if I want to (Skrr) / Hop out that bitch with that iron in my jumpsuit (Go)/ Just do what I say and I love you (Okay?)" He raps about the poverty he has escaped and the current riches of his life, including private jets and sex. The instrumental of the song features an echoing choral sample.

== Critical reception ==
Tom Breihan of Stereogum called the song a "raunchy two-minute rap attack". Glenn Rowley of Consequence writes that in the "braggadocios" track, DaBaby "unapologetically flexes".

== Music video ==
The music video, directed by DaBaby himself, finds him leading a high school student body through a wild library study hall, a food fight in the cafeteria, a game of Twister and to the outdoor basketball courts. A cheerleading squad is seen twerking in the classroom, and at the basketball courts, a giant diapered baby mascot dances.

== Live performances ==
DaBaby performed the song at the BET Awards 2021.

== Charts ==
=== Weekly charts ===
Weekly chart performance for "Ball If I Want To"
| Chart (2021) | Peak position |
|---|---|
| Canada Hot 100 (Billboard) | 48 |
| Global 200 (Billboard) | 60 |
| New Zealand Hot Singles (RMNZ) | 8 |
| US Billboard Hot 100 | 39 |
| US Hot R&B/Hip-Hop Songs (Billboard) | 13 |
| US Rolling Stone Top 100 | 24 |

=== Year-end charts ===
Year-end chart performance for "Ball If I Want To"
| Chart (2021) | Position |
|---|---|
| US Hot R&B/Hip-Hop Songs (Billboard) | 96 |

== Certifications ==
Certifications for "Ball If I Want To"
| Region | Certification | Certified units/sales |
|---|---|---|
| Brazil (Pro-Música Brasil) | Gold | 20,000^{‡} |
^{‡} Sales+streaming figures based on certification alone.
