= D.A. Got That Dope =

American record producer (born 1984)

- Also known as: D.A. Doman; D.A. on the Track Man
- Born: David Lewis Doman; August 3, 1984 (age 42); Chicago, Illinois, U.S.
- Genres: Hip hop; trap; R&B
- Occupations: Record producer; songwriter
- Years active: 2007–present
- Labels: Guaranteed Millions; Beluga Heights

David Lewis "D.A." Doman (born August 3, 1984), known professionally as D.A. Got That Dope (stylized in all lowercase), is an American record producer from Chicago, Illinois. He began his career in the mid-2000s working with Chicago-based underground artists such as Bump J, Mikkey Halsted, and Kidz in the Hall. He handled drum programming for record producer J. R. Rotem for several years, and in 2011, he moved to Los Angeles to further pursue work in the music industry.

D.A. has since been credited on the singles "Privacy" by Chris Brown, "Zeze" by Kodak Black, "Taste" by Tyga, "Godzilla" by Eminem and Juice Wrld, and "Demons" by Doja Cat. In 2019, Doman discovered American rapper and singer 24kGoldn, for whom he has served as A&R.

== Career ==
In 2009, he co-produced the single "Everybody in Love" for JLS, which earned platinum certification by the British Phonographic Industry (BPI) and peaked atop the UK Singles Chart.

== Production discography ==
=== Charted singles ===
List of singles as producer, with chart positions and certifications, showing year released, performing artists and album name
| Title | Year | Peak chart positions | | | Certifications | Album | References |
| Title | Year | US | US R&B | UK | Certifications | Album | References |
|---|---|---|---|---|---|---|---|
| "Everybody in Love" (JLS) | 2009 | | | 1 | | JLS | |
| "Text" (Mann featuring Jason Derulo) | 2011 | | | | | Mann's World | |
| "Do My Dance" (Tyga featuring 2 Chainz) | 2012 | 111 | 32 | — | RIAA: Gold | Well Done 3 | |
| "When I Feel Like It" (Fabolous featuring 2 Chainz) | 2013 | — | 55 | — | | —N/a | |
| "Don't Hate Tha Playa" (Tyga) | 2013 | | | | RIAA: Gold | Hotel California | |
| "MYB" (Kevin Gates featuring Starlito) | 2013 | | | | | Stranger Than Fiction | |
| "Young Kobe" (Tyga) | 2013 | | | | | Well Done 4 | |
| "Bank" (Kid Ink) | 2015 | | | | | Summer in the Winter | |
| "The Town" (Vee the Rula) | 2015 | | | | | Rula 2 | |
| "One Day" (Kid Ink) | 2016 | | | | | RSS2 | |
| "Ridah" (Lil Bibby) | 2016 | | | | | Ridah | |
| "Privacy" (Chris Brown) | 2017 | 62 | 26 | 86 | RIAA: 3× Platinum | Heartbreak on a Full Moon | |
| "Pie" (Future featuring Chris Brown) | 2017 | — | 92 | — | | Hndrxx | |
| "Taste" (Tyga featuring Offset) | 2018 | 8 | 7 | 5 | RIAA: Diamond; BPI: 2× Platinum | Legendary | |
| "Swish" (Tyga) | 2018 | 102 | 47 | 72 | RIAA: Platinum; BPI: Silver | Legendary | |
| "Zeze" (Kodak Black featuring Travis Scott and Offset) | 2018 | 2 | 1 | 8 | RIAA: 6× Platinum; ARIA: Platinum; BPI: Platinum | Dying to Live | |
| "Dip" (Tyga featuring Nicki Minaj) | 2018 | 63 | 31 | 62 | RIAA: Platinum | Legendary | |
| "Or Not" (FBG Duck, FBG Young, FBG Dutchie) | 2018 | | | | | Big Clout | |
| "Tripolar" (Ann Marie) | 2018 | | | | | Tripolar | |
| "YUSO" (Kid Ink, Lil Wayne, Saweetie) | 2018 | | | | | Missed Calls | |
| "Save That" (Rich the Kid) | 2019 | | | | | The World Is Yours 2 | |
| "Games On Your Phone" (24kGoldn) | 2019 | | | | | N/A | |
| "Floss In The Bank" (Tyga) | 2019 | | | | | Legendary | |
| "Lifestyle" (Liife) | 2019 | | | | | N/A | |
| "Wings" (Shoreline Mafia) | 2019 | | | | | Party Pack, Vol. 2 | |
| "Godzilla" (Eminem featuring Juice Wrld) | 2020 | 3 | 3 | 1 | RIAA: 3× Platinum; ARIA: 2× Platinum; BPI: Platinum; Canada: 2× Platinum | Music to be Murdered By | |
| "Gnat" (Eminem) | 2020 | | | | | Music to Be Murdered By: Side B | |
| "Made It Out" (Jackboy) | 2020 | | | | | Love Me While I'm Here | |
| "51st Disciple" (Gang51e June) | 2020 | | | | | 51st Disciple | |
| "Cry Baby" (Megan Thee Stallion featuring DaBaby) | 2021 | 28 | 13 | — | RIAA: Gold | Good News | |
| "Masterpiece" (DaBaby) | 2021 | 55 | 20 | — | RIAA: Gold | | |
| "Ball If I Want To" (DaBaby) | 2021 | | 39 | 13 | — | | |
| "Red Light Green Light" (DaBaby) | 2021 | | 50 | 19 | — | | |
| "Get Fly" (OhGeesy featuring DaBaby) | 2021 | | | | | | |
| "Goddamn" (Tyga featuring A Boogie wit da Hoodie) | 2021 | | | | | | |
| "Head Tap" (Pressa, Sleepy Hallow, Sheff G) | 2021 | | | | | | |
| "Motley Crew" (Post Malone) | 2021 | 13 | 3 | 31 | | | |
| "Demons" (Doja Cat) | 2023 | 46 | 12 | 53 | | Scarlet | |
"—" denotes a recording that did not chart or was not released in that territory.

=== Non-singles ===
List of non-singles, with showing year released, performing artists, album name and other producers
| Song | Artist(s) | Year | Album | Co-Producer(s) | More Info | |
|---|---|---|---|---|---|---|
| "Candy Coated Diamonds" | 2 Pistols | 2008 | Death Before Dishonor | | | |
| "Slow It Down" | Tyga | 2009 | The Potential | | | |
| "Know You Better" | Blazed | 2010 | —N/a | | | |
| "Take over the World" | Kidz in the Hall, Just Blaze, Colin Munroe | 2010 | Land Of Make Believe | Just Blaze, Damon Sharpe | | |
| "Simple Life" | Kidz in the Hall, Amanda Diva | 2010 | Land Of Make Believe | Miykal Snoddy, PicnycTyme | | |
| "Hustlaz Need Love 2" | Mikkey Halsted | 2010 | The Dark Room | none | | |
| "Heartbeat" | Iyaz | 2010 | Replay | J.R. Rotem | | |
| "Ferrari Lifestyle" | The Game, Fabolous, Jim Lavigne | 2011 | Purp & Patron | | | |
| "Take Me Away" | U-KISS, Hoon, Kevin Woo | 2011 | Neverland | none | | |
| "No More" | Spica | 2012 | Russian Roulette | Ryan Jhun, Amanshia Nunoo, Drew Scalercio | | |
| "Black Crowns" | Tyga, Cameron Forbes | 2012 | Careless World: Rise of the Last King | Jess Jackson | | |
| "This Is Like" | Tyga, Robin Thicke | 2012 | Careless World: Rise of the Last King | none | | |
| "Lay You Down" | Tyga, Lil Wayne | 2012 | Careless World: Rise of the Last King | none | | |
| "Painkiller" | Spica | 2012 | Russian Roulette | none | | |
| "Do My Dance" | Cassie, Too $hort | 2013 | RockaByeBaby | none | | |
| "Drive Fast, Live Young" | Tyga | 2013 | Hotel California | none | RIAA: Gold | |
| "Get Em" | Kevin Gates | 2013 | Stranger Than Fiction | none | | |
| "When I Feel Like It" | Fabolous | 2013 | Welcome to 2013 | none | | |
| "Senile" | Tyga, Nicki Minaj, Lil Wayne | 2014 | Young Money: Rise of an Empire | none | | |
| "What It Be Like" | Stalley, Nipsey Hussle | 2014 | Ohio | none | | |
| "She Like Me" | Shy Glizzy, Migos | 2014 | Law 3: Now Or Never | none | | |
| "About Mine" | Kid Ink, Trey Songz | 2015 | Full Speed | none | | DJ Mustard, The Truth |
| "Diamonds And Gold" | Kid Ink, Verse Simmonds | 2015 | Full Speed | none | | |
| "Let Em Know" | Kid Ink, Vee Tha Rula | 2015 | Full Speed | none | | |
| "D.G.I.F.U." | Chris Brown, Tyga, Pusha T | 2015 | Fan of a Fan: The Album | Jess Jackson | | |
| "Real One" | Chris Brown, Tyga, Lil Boosie | 2015 | Fan of a Fan: The Album | none | | |
| "Bunkin'" | Chris Brown, Tyga, Jay 305, T.I. | 2015 | Fan of a Fan: The Album | none | | |
| "Wham" | Tyga | 2015 | The Gold Album: 18th Dynasty | none | | |
| "Confidence" | King Los | 2015 | God, Money, War | none | | |
| "One Thing" | Kevin Gates | 2016 | Islah (album) | none | RIAA: 2× Platinum | |
| "Freed Up" | Chris Brown | 2016 | Before the Trap: Nights in Tarzana | none | | |
| "Get Down Low" | Snow Tha Product | 2016 | Half Way There Pt. 1 | none | | |
| "Wake Up" | Juliann Alexander | 2016 | Wake Up | none | | |
| "Remix'n A Bricc" | Bricc Baby | 2016 | Nasty Dealer 2 | none | | |
| "Tell Me What 2 Do" | Chris Brown | 2017 | Heartbreak on a Full Moon | none | RIAA: 2× Platinum | |
| "Hurt the Same" | Chris Brown | 2017 | Heartbreak on a Full Moon | none | RIAA: 2× Platinum | |
| "Dreaming" | Mark Battles, Tory Lanez | 2017 | Day 2 | none | | |
| "Good Love" | Mark Battles, Tory Lanez | 2017 | Day 2 | none | | |
| "Green Line" | Princess Nokia | 2017 | 1992 | none | | |
| "On Smash" | Lil Dicky, Brain | 2017 | I'm Brain | none | | |
| "Why I" | Kevin Gates | 2017 | By Any Means 2 | none | | |
| "100 Different Ways" | Kid Ink | 2017 | RSS2 | none | | |
| "Diamonds and Gold (Remix)" | Kid Ink featuring Chris Brown, French Montana, Verse Simmonds | 2017 | Welcome Home | none | | |
| "Sleeping on the Floor" | Lil Bibby | 2017 | FC3 the Epilogue | none | | |
| "Rose'" | Swift | 2017 | For What it's Worth | none | | |
| "Dreaming" | Mark Battles, Tory Lanez | 2017 | Day 2 | none | | |
| "Happy Birthday" | Rob Cantor | 2017 | Disney JuniorMusic Nursery Rhymes Vol. 1 | none | | |
| "Step Back" | Paper Lovee | 2018 | Waiting to Exhale | none | | |
| "Said So" | Famous Dex | 2018 | Dex Meets Dexter | none | | |
| "Toes Out" | Queen Key | 2018 | Eat My Pussy | none | | |
| "Freaky With You" | Nelly, Jacquees | 2018 | —N/a | none | | |
| "Big Clout" | FBG Duck | 2018 | Big Clout | none | | |
| "100" | OMB Peezy, Lil Durk | 2019 | Preacher To the Streets | none | | |
| "World Is Yours 2 (Intro)" | Rich the Kid | 2019 | The World Is Yours 2 | none | | |
| "Bestie" | Bhad Bhabie, Megan Thee Stallion | 2019 | —N/a | none | | |
| "Sweat (When I Think About You)" | Stanaj | 2019 | —N/a | none | | |
| "Games On Your Phone" | 24kGoldn | 2019 | —N/a | | | |
| "Rich Off" | Kevin Gates | 2019 | Only Generals Gon Understand | | | |
| "February Love" | Tyga, Chris Brown | 2019 | Legendary | RIAA: Platinum | | |
| "Made Me" | Tyga, Bazzi | 2019 | Legendary | RIAA: Platinum | | |
| "Sexy" | Chris Brown, Trey Songz | 2019 | Indigo | RIAA: Platinum; BPI: Silver | | |
| "Problem With You" | Chris Brown | 2019 | Indigo | RIAA: Platinum; BPI: Silver | | |
| "Going At It" | Chris Brown | 2019 | Indigo | RIAA: Platinum; BPI: Silver | | |
| "The Relays" | Maxo Kream, Travis Scott | 2019 | Brandon Banks | | | |
| "Pray 2 the Dope" | Maxo Kream | 2019 | Brandon Banks | | | |
| "8 Figures" | Maxo Kream | 2019 | Brandon Banks | | | |
| "Easy Breezy" | Kiana Ledé | 2019 | Easy Breezy | | | |
| "Dropped Out of College" | 24kGoldn | 2019 | Dropped Out of College | | | |
| "Reckless" | Smokepurpp | 2019 | Deadstar 2 | | | |
| "Universe" | Ty Dolla Sign featuring Kehlani | 2020 | Featuring Ty Dolla Sign | | | |
| "Those Kinda Nights" | Eminem featuring Ed Sheeran | 2020 | Music to Be Murdered By | RIAA: Gold | | |
| "No Regrets" | Eminem featuring Don Toliver | 2020 | Music to Be Murdered By | RIAA: Gold | | |
| "PTSD" | G Herbo featuring Chance the Rapper, Juice WRLD, Lil Uzi Vert | 2020 | PTSD | RIAA: Platinum | | |
| "Shooter" | G Herbo featuring Jacquees | 2020 | PTSD Deluxe | | | |
| "These Demons" | Eminem featuring MAJ | 2020 | Music to Be Murdered By: Side B | | Eminem, Mike Zombie, The Loud Pack | |
| "Killer" | Eminem | 2020 | Music to Be Murdered By: Side B | | | |
| "Vibes" | Blueface | 2020 | Find the Beat | | | |
| "Dirty" | Blueface | 2020 | Find the Beat | | | |
| "Clouds in the Air" | Wiz Khalifa featuring K Camp | 2020 | The Saga of Wiz Khalifa | | | |
| "Man Down" | NLE Choppa | 2020 | From Dark to Light | | | |
| "Hard to Creep" | Jackboy featuring 42 Dugg | 2020 | Love Me While I'm Here | | | |
| "51st Disciple" | Gang51e June | 2020 | 51st Disciple | | | |
| "Tyrant" | Beyoncé | 2024 | Cowboy Carter | | | |

=== Film Soundtrack ===
| Song | Year | Album | Co-Artist(s) |
|---|---|---|---|
| "Underdog" | 2025 | F1 the Album | Terrace Martin |

== See also ==
- Category:Songs written by D.A. Got That Dope
