= Legendary (Tyga album) =

Studio album by Tyga
- Released: June 7, 2019
- Genres: Hip hop; trap; R&B
- Length: 42:03
- Labels: Last Kings; EMPIRE
- Producers: B HAM; Boi-1da; Cirkut; DannyBoyStyles; D. A. Doman; DJ Snake; Dr. Luke; Dupri; Extendo Beatz; Kaelin Capron; K.E. on the Track; Murda Beatz; Mustard; Official; Sool Got Hits; TT Audi; Twice as Nice

Tyga chronology
Kyoto (2018)	Legendary (2019)	Hit Me When U Leave the Klub: The Playlist (2023)

Censored edition cover

Deluxe edition cover

Singles from Legendary
- 1. "Taste" Released: May 16, 2018; 2. "Swish" Released: July 25, 2018; 3. "Dip" Released: October 29, 2018; 4. "Floss in the Bank" Released: January 11, 2019; 5. "Girls Have Fun" Released: January 23, 2019; 6. "Goddamn" Released: April 15, 2019; 7. "Haute" Released: June 5, 2019

Legendary is the seventh studio album by American rapper Tyga, released on June 7, 2019, by Last Kings Records and Empire Distribution. It follows the release of his sixth album Kyoto (2018). It includes the singles "Taste" featuring Offset, "Goddamn" (featuring A Boogie wit da Hoodie on the album version), and "Haute" featuring Chris Brown and J Balvin. A deluxe version of the album was released on August 23, 2019. It features four previously released singles: "Dip" with Nicki Minaj, "Girls Have Fun" featuring G-Eazy and Rich the Kid, "Swish" and "Floss in the Bank", as well as four new songs.

== Background ==
Tyga said he had no intentions of releasing a full-length project at the time, but felt inspired after receiving constant requests from fans following the release of his single "Taste": "I really didn't plan to have a whole album," Tyga said in an interview with Ryan Seacrest. "I was just putting out singles, just putting out party vibes, and I was just recording as I went and people were like 'We want an album! We want an album!' So I was like it's only right one year later, let me drop it for the summer."

Legendary was originally supposed to be a double album, and was announced as such by Tyga in 2019. However, it ended up having 14 tracks on its standard edition. He said that the recording process for the album was to "not write [the lyrics] down, record it as I go."

Tyga said that the album's cover art was inspired by Carter II and also an old Ice T cover.

== Critical reception ==
Professional ratings
Review scores
Source	Rating
HipHopDX	2.5/5
HotNewHipHop	73%
RapReviews	6/10

HotNewHipHop reviewed it positively, commenting that “Legendary recognizes that the formula of “Taste” is, not only a successful one, but what a lot of people want and expect to hear from him.” Vulture called it “a smarter, more judiciously crafted version of a DJ Khaled album: It ropes in major stars, up-and-comers, and bubbling sounds but molds them into the coherent vision of a single human being.”

HipHopDX gave a mixed-to-negative response towards the album, saying that "If Tyga’s goal is to be as Legendary as the title of his latest album suggests, he needs to do better. After all, he certainly knows better".

== Commercial performance ==
On the day of the release, Legendary was certified gold by the Recording Industry Association of America (RIAA) due to a technicality which incorporates the track-equivalent units moved by the previously released single "Taste".

Legendary debuted at number 17 on the US Billboard 200 with 24,524 album-equivalent units. The album marks his highest-charting project since 2015's Fan of a Fan: The Album collaboration with Chris Brown.

== Track listing ==
Credits adapted from Apple Music, Tidal and BMI.

Standard edition
No.	Title	Writer(s)	Producer(s)	Length
1.	"Too Many"	Michael Stevenson; Dijon McFarlane; Leslie Wakefield	Mustard; Official	2:25
2.	"Lightskin Lil Wayne"	Stevenson; Dwayne Carter; Matthew Samuels; Kaelin Capron	Boi-1da; TT Audi^{[a]}; Kaelin Capron^{[a]}	2:33
3.	"On Me" (featuring Lil Wayne)	Stevenson; Carter; Donte Blacksher	Dupri; K.E. on the Track^{[a]}	2:42
4.	"Stash" (featuring Blueface)	Stevenson; Johnathan Porter; McFarlane; Wakefield; Nick Seeley	Mustard; Official	2:54
5.	"Haute" (featuring J Balvin and Chris Brown)	Stevenson; José Balvin; Christopher Brown; Lukasz Gottwald; Brandon Hamlin	Dr. Luke; B HAM	2:40
6.	"Werkkkk"	Stevenson; McFarlane; Wakefield	Mustard; Official	3:20
7.	"Maykherkhum"	Stevenson; Blacksher	Dupri	2:37
8.	"Vibrate" (featuring Swae Lee)	Stevenson; Jason Evigan; Khalif Brown; Jesse Saint John; Brittany Hazzard; Hunt; Te Whiti Warbrick; Capron; Blacksher	Dupri; Extendo Beatz	3:33
9.	"Shit I Like"	Stevenson; Chris Brown; Blacksher	Dupri; Extendo Beatz	3:01
10.	"Legendary" (featuring Gunna)	Stevenson; Sergio Kitchens	Murda Beatz; Sool Got Hits^{[a]}	2:32
11.	"February Love" (featuring Chris Brown)	Stevenson; Brown; David Doman	D. A. Doman	3:37
12.	"Goddamn" (featuring A Boogie wit da Hoodie)	Stevenson; Artist Dubose; Doman; Justin Thomas; Adele Elysee	D. A. Doman	3:31
13.	"Taste" (featuring Offset)	Stevenson; Kiari Cephus; Doman; Cameron Lewis	D. A. Doman	3:49
14.	"Made Me" (featuring Bazzi)	Stevenson; Andrew Bazzi; Seeley; Ilsey Juber; Hazzard; Doman	D. A. Doman	2:49
Total length:				42:03

Deluxe edition bonus tracks
No.	Title	Writer(s)	Producer(s)	Length
15.	"Penthouse in Miami" (with Starrah)	Stevenson; Juber; Henry Walter; Hazzard; Danny Schofield	Cirkut; DannyBoyStyles	2:46
16.	"Love to Fuck"	Stevenson; Doman; Diaz	D. A. Doman; Sool Got Hits	3:25
17.	"Dip" (with Nicki Minaj)	Stevenson; Onika Maraj; Doman; Elysee	D. A. Doman	3:15
18.	"Too Much"	Stevenson; Doman	D. A. Doman	2:57
19.	"Slidin" (featuring Ty Dolla Sign and Takeoff)	Stevenson; Tyrone Griffin; Krishnic Ball; McFarlane; Warbrick; Hamlin	D. A. Doman	3:37
20.	"Bop" (with YG and Blueface)	Stevenson; Keenon Jackson; Porter; McFarlane; Wakefield	Mustard; Official	2:59
21.	"Swish"	Stevenson; Doman; Cameron Lewis; Terrelle Gallo	D. A. Doman	3:14
22.	"Floss in the Bank"	Stevenson; Thomas; Adrienne Bryne	D. A. Doman	2:31
23.	"Girls Have Fun" (featuring G-Eazy and Rich the Kid)	Stevenson; Gerald Gillum; Dimitri Roger; Nicholas Audino; Lewis Hughes; Warbrick; William Grigahcine	Twice as Nice; DJ Snake	2:55
Total length:				69:44

Notes

- ^{^[a]} signifies an uncredited co-producer
- "Swish" is stylized in all caps
- Every song in Spotify, including the deluxe edition, have one canvas each.

== Credits and personnel ==
Credits adapted from Tidal.

=== Production ===
- Mustard– production (tracks 1, 4, and 5), co-production (track 6)
- Official – production (tracks 1, 4, and 5), co-production (track 6)
- Boi-1da – production (track 2)
- Dupri – production (tracks 3 and 7-9)
- B HAM – production (track 6)
- Dr. Luke – production (track 5)
- D. A. Doman – production (tracks 7 and 11-14)
- Extendo Beatz – production (tracks 8 and 9)
- Murda Beatz – production (track 10)
- Kaelin Capron – co-production (track 2)
- TT Audi – co-production (track 2)
- Sool Hot Hits – co-production (track 10)

=== Technical ===
- Christian "CQ" Quinonez – engineering (all tracks)

== Charts ==
Chart (2019)	Peak position
Australian Albums (ARIA)	12
Austrian Albums (Ö3 Austria)	18
Belgian Albums (Ultratop Flanders)	45
Belgian Albums (Ultratop Wallonia)	125
Canadian Albums (Billboard)	7
Danish Albums (Hitlisten)	25
Dutch Albums (Album Top 100)	22
Finnish Albums (Suomen virallinen lista)	17
French Albums (SNEP)	93
Irish Albums (IRMA)	71
Italian Albums (FIMI)	74
Latvian Albums (LAIPA)	18
Lithuanian Albums (AGATA)	27
New Zealand Albums (RMNZ)	17
Norwegian Albums (VG-lista)	21
Swedish Albums (Sverigetopplistan)	50
Swiss Albums (Schweizer Hitparade)	17
UK Albums (Official Charts)	43
US Billboard 200	17
US Independent Albums (Billboard)	6
US Top R&B/Hip-Hop Albums (Billboard)	7

== Certifications ==
Region	Certification	Certified units/sales
United States (RIAA)	Platinum	1,000,000^{‡}
^{‡} Sales+streaming figures based on certification alone.
