= Lips Don't Lie =

Single by Ally Brooke featuring A Boogie wit da Hoodie
- Released: May 24, 2019
- Recorded: October 29, 2018–May 2019
- Genre: R&B
- Length: 2:46
- Label: Atlantic; Latium
- Songwriters: Artist Dubose; Oscar Görres; Allyson Brooke Hernandez; Elof Loelv; Madison Love
- Producers: Elof Loelv; Oscar Görres

Ally Brooke singles chronology
"Low Key" (2019)	"Lips Don't Lie" (2019)	"Higher" (2019)

A Boogie wit da Hoodie singles chronology
"HML" (2018)	"Lips Don't Lie" (2019)	"Young Grizzly World" (2019)

Music video
- "Lips Don't Lie" on YouTube

"Lips Don't Lie" is a song by American singer Ally Brooke, featuring American rapper A Boogie wit da Hoodie. The single was released on May 24, 2019, through labels Atlantic Records and Latium Entertainment as the then-second single for Brooke's upcoming debut solo album. The song was written by the artists alongside Oscar Görres, Elof Loelv, and Madison Love, and produced by Loelv and Görres.

== Background ==
Brooke said that she first heard the song in August 2018, and she wanted to record it as soon as she heard the first few seconds. She recorded the song on October 29, 2018. On May 15, 2019, Brooke posted a screenshot of herself listening to the song.

== Music and lyrics ==
Rolling Stone wrote that "Lips Don't Lie" is a midtempo song featuring a "piano-driven beat beneath smoky vocals from Brooke". Brooke sings about "her lover’s kiss revealing all" while A Boogie wit da Hoodie "tells a different story on his verse, channeling jealousy and hurt feelings". While A Boogie wit da Hoodie does curse in his verse, the explicit lyrics were censored in the final version of the song.

== Music video ==
The official music video for "Lips Don't Lie" was released alongside the single, on May 24, 2019. The video features Brooke sporting a number of lipstick shades and jewel-encrusted nails, singing the lyrics of the song to a zoomed-in camera; A Boogie wit da Hoodie also appears throughout the video and raps his verse later on. The cover art for the single was taken from a scene in the music video, as Brooke sports the same nails and one of the several lipsticks she wears in the video on the cover. As of February 2020, the video has accumulated over 10 million views on YouTube.

== Track listing ==
Digital download
No.	Title	Length
1.	"Lips Don't Lie" (feat. A Boogie Wit da Hoodie)	2:46

Digital download / Remix
No.	Title	Length
1.	"Lips Don't Lie" (feat. A Boogie Wit da Hoodie [R3HAB Remix])	3:04

Digital download / Stripped
No.	Title	Length
1.	"Lips Don't Lie" (Stripped)	2:48
2.	"Lips Don't Lie" (feat. A Boogie Wit da Hoodie)	2:46

== Charts ==
=== Weekly charts ===
Chart (2019–21)	Peak position
Belgium (Ultratip Bubbling Under Wallonia)	35
Belgium Urban (Ultratop Wallonia)	41
CIS Airplay (TopHit)	145
Romania (Airplay 100)	4
Ukraine Airplay (TopHit) R3HAB Remix	26
US Pop Airplay (Billboard)	38
US Rhythmic Airplay (Billboard)	36

=== Year-end charts ===
Chart (2019)	Position
Romania (Airplay 100)	58

Chart (2020)	Position
Romania (Airplay 100)	16

Year-end chart performance for "Lips Don't Lie"
Chart (2022)	Position
Ukraine Airplay (TopHit)	120

== Release history ==
Region	Date	Format	Label	Ref.
Various	May 24, 2019	Digital download; streaming	Atlantic; Latium	
United States	May 28, 2019	Contemporary hit radio	Atlantic; Latium	
