= Joe Stone =

Dutch DJ and record producer (born 1984)

- Also known as: Inmado
- Born: Maurice Joell Oude Booyink; January 8, 1984 (age 42); Almelo, Netherlands
- Genres: House; future house
- Occupations: DJ; record producer
- Instrument: Synthesizer
- Years active: 2013–present
- Label: Spinnin' Records

Maurice Oude Booyink (born January 8, 1984) is a Dutch DJ and record producer from Almelo, best known under the stage names Inmado and Joe Stone.

After producing for artists such as Havana Brown and R3hab, Joe Stone has been dedicated to his personal career and joined the label Spinnin' Records in 2015 after winning a "remix contest" organized during the year. He had his first success with remixing "This Is How We Do It" by Montell Jordan titled "The Party (This Is How We Do It)", which reached the singles charts in the United Kingdom, Ireland, and in the Netherlands.

== Discography ==
=== Singles ===
==== Charting singles ====
Year	Title	Peak chart positions												Album
Year	Title	NLD	AUS	AUT	BEL (Vl)	BEL (Wa)	FRA	GER	IRL	SWE	SWI	UK	US Dance	Album
2015	"The Party (This Is How We Do It)" (featuring Montell Jordan)	90	—	—	32^{[A]}	27^{[B]}	—	—	65	—	—	17	23	Non-album singles
2015	"Freak (And You Know It)" (with Daser)	—	—	—	32^{[A]}	27^{[B]}	—	—	—	—	—	—	—	Non-album singles
2016	"Man Enough" (with Ferreck Dawn)	—	—	—	—	—	—	—	—	—	—	—	—	Non-album singles
2020	"Mind Control" (with Camden Cox)	—	—	—	—	—	—	—	—	—	—	—	—	Non-album singles
2020	"Superstar" (with Four of Diamonds)	—	—	—	—	—	—	—	—	—	—	—	—	Non-album singles
"—" denotes a recording that did not chart or was not released in that territory.

==== Other singles ====
- 2015: "The Party" (Firebeatz Remix) [Spinnin' Remixes]
- 2016: "Sublime" (with Ferreck Dawn) [Spinnin' Records]
- 2017: "Make Love" [Spinnin' Deep]
- 2017: "Let's Go Together" [Spinnin' Records]
- 2018: "Is It Really Love" (vs. Cr3on) [Spinnin' Records]
- 2018: "Keep This Fire Burning" (with Bolier) [Spinnin' Records]
- 2018: "Loaded Gun" (with Monn) [Spinnin' Records]
- 2019: "Bug a Boo" [Spinnin' Records]
- 2020: "Only You" (with Jake Tarry feat. Hayley May) [Spinnin' Records]
- 2020: "Feeling Dynamite" (with Ally Brooke) [Spinnin' Records]

=== Remixes ===
- 2015: Kris Kross Amsterdam & CHOCO - "Until the Morning" (Joe Stone Remix) [Spinnin' Remixes]
- 2015: Matrix & Futurebound, V. Bozeman - "Happy Alone" (Joe Stone Remix) [Parlophone UK]
- 2015: Felix Jaehn, Linying, Lost Frequencies - "Eagle Eyes" (Joe Stone Remix) [Spinnin' Remixes]
- 2016: R3hab & Quintino - "Freak" (Joe Stone Remix) [Spinnin' Remixes]
- 2016: EDX, Mingue - "Missing" (Joe Stone Remix) [Spinnin' Remixes]
- 2016: Lee Cabrera - "Shake It (Move a Little Closer)" (Joe Stone Remix) [Spinnin' Remixes]
- 2017: Olav Basoski, Spyder - "Waterman 2017" (Joe Stone Remix) [Spinnin' Remixes]
- 2017: David Guetta, Afrojack, Charli XCX, French Montana - "Dirty Sexy Money" (Joe Stone Remix) [What A Music]
- 2018: Sam Feldt, Sam Martin - "Carry Me Home" (Joe Stone Remix) [Spinnin' Remixes]
- 2018: Dastic - "Let Me Love You" (Joe Stone Remix) [Spinnin' Remixes]
- 2018: Kylie Minogue - "Stop Me from Falling" (Joe Stone Remix) [BMG]
- 2018: Carl Kennedy, Maiko Spencer - "The Love You Bring Me" (Joe Stone Remix) [Spinnin' Remixes]
- 2019: Brooks featuring Zoë Moss - "Limbo" (Joe Stone Remix)

== Notes ==
- A Did not enter the Ultratop 50, but peaked on the Flemish Ultratip chart.
- B Did not enter the Ultratop 50, but peaked on the Walloon Ultratip chart.
