= Haute (song) =

Single by Tyga featuring J Balvin & Chris Brown

from the album Legendary
- Released: June 5, 2019
- Recorded: 2019
- Genre: Hip-hop; chiptune
- Length: 2:40
- Label: Last Kings; Empire
- Songwriters: Stevenson; José Balvin; Christopher Brown; Lukasz Gottwald; Brandon Hamlin
- Producers: Dr. Luke; B HAM

Tyga singles chronology
"Go Loko" (2019)	"Haute" (2019)	"Loco Contigo" (2019)

Chris Brown singles chronology
"Easy (Remix)" (2019)	"Haute" (2019)	"No Guidance" (2019)

J Balvin singles chronology
"La Rebelión" (2019)	"Haute" (2019)	"Loco Contigo" (2019)

Music video
- "Haute" on YouTube

"Haute" is a song by American rapper Tyga. It was released on June 5, 2019 as the seventh single from his seventh album Legendary for streaming and digital download by Last Kings Music and Empire Distribution. The song was produced by Dr. Luke and includes two guest verses from reggaeton singer J Balvin and longtime collaborator Chris Brown. The music video was also released on June 5, 2019.

== Charts ==
Chart (2019)	Peak position
Australia (ARIA)	50
Austria (Ö3 Austria Top 40)	58
Canada (Canadian Hot 100)	55
Greece (IFPI)	52
Ireland (IRMA)	78
New Zealand Hot Singles (RMNZ)	6
Switzerland (Schweizer Hitparade)	23
UK Singles (OCC)	66
US Bubbling Under Hot 100 (Billboard)	1
US Hot R&B/Hip-Hop Songs (Billboard)	42
US Rhythmic Airplay (Billboard)	20
