= Low Key (Ally Brooke song) =

2019 single by Ally Brooke

Single by Ally Brooke featuring Tyga
- Released: January 31, 2019
- Genre: Dance-pop
- Length: 3:21
- Label: Atlantic; Latium
- Songwriters: Allyson Brooke Hernandez; Grant Williams; Ian Kirkpatrick; Joseph Spargur; John Ryan II; Julian Bunetta; Michael Stevenson; Scott Friedman; Teddy Geiger
- Producers: Kirkpatrick; Geiger

Ally Brooke singles chronology
"Vámonos" (2018)	"Low Key" (2019)	"Lips Don't Lie" (2019)

Tyga singles chronology
"Girls Have Fun" (2019)	"Low Key" (2019)	"Goddamn" (2019)

Music video
- "Low Key" on YouTube

"Low Key" is a single by American singer Ally Brooke featuring American rapper Tyga. The song was released on January 31, 2019, by Atlantic Records, along with its music video, as the then-lead single from Brooke's upcoming debut solo album. The song has a no rap version that's played on some radio stations and which was performed on 2019 Kids Choice Awards' Orange Carpet.

== Background ==
Brooke had been in the studio for many months trying to find her sound and the right song to release, recording over 50 songs in the process. Brooke said she had recorded a completely different song to "Low Key" that was considered, but "we could never quite get it right". "Low Key" was introduced to her by her manager, who told her if her label executives could secure the track it would be her first single. He played it for Brooke and she agreed it was perfect for her, considering the track "sassy, fun, and sexy". Brooke said the song was originally written for a male voice. They changed the key to fit a female voice, Brooke raising it "like two keys higher". After fine-tuning the song, executives from her record label then recommended adding rapper Tyga to the track.

Brooke began teasing the release of the single in the beginning of January 2019. In the week of the single's premiere, snippets of the song, behind the scenes photos, stills, and a preview of the music video were released on Brooke's social media pages. Brooke also teased the song by sending over 100 personalized messages to fans. "Low Key" is her official debut single, originally intended for her debut album. The song and its music video was released on January 31, 2019 and has surprassed 40 million views on YouTube.

== Music and lyrics ==
"Low Key" was co-written by John Ryan, Teddy Geiger, Julian Bunetta, Ally Brooke, Scott Harris, Ian Kirkpatrick, Joseph Michael Spargur, Michael Stevenson and Williams Cermyth. Brooke said the lyrics refer to a flirtation with another person, asking them to get to know her, and they also represent her introduction to the world as a solo artist. Billboard described "Low Key" as a "mid-tempo, R&B-tinged track". MTV said the song is a "glimpse into the Latin-meets-urban-pop genre" Brooke is delivering. Time described it as "spirited, club-ready dance pop".

== Track listing ==
Digital download

1. "Low Key" – 3:21

MK Remix

1. "Low Key" (MK Remix) – 3:48
2. "Low Key" (MK Extended Remix) – 6:11

Play N Skillz Remix

1. "Low Key" (Play N Skillz Remix) – 2:46

== Charts ==
=== Weekly charts ===
Chart (2019)	Peak position
Belgium (Ultratip Bubbling Under Wallonia)	17
Belgium Urban (Ultratop Wallonia)	26
China Airplay/FL (Billboard)	38
Croatia (HRT)	91
Israel (Media Forest)	2
New Zealand Hot Singles (RMNZ)	39
Mexico Ingles Airplay (Billboard)	4
Romania (Airplay 100)	11
Russia Airplay (Tophit)	66
US Bubbling Under Hot 100 (Billboard)	18
US Dance/Mix Show Airplay (Billboard)	33
US Pop Airplay (Billboard)	24
US Rhythmic Airplay (Billboard)	25

=== Year-end charts ===
Chart (2019)	Position
Romania (Airplay 100)	81
