= Look at Us Now =

Single by Lost Kings featuring Ally Brooke and ASAP Ferg

from the album We Are Lost Kings (Japan EP)
- Released: June 9, 2017
- Recorded: 2017
- Genre: EDM
- Length: 3:45
- Label: Disruptor; RCA
- Songwriters: Robert Abisi; Darold Durard Brown; Leroy Clampitt; Norris Shanholtz; Caroline Margaret Smith; Jesse B Thomas; Chris Wallace

Lost Kings singles chronology
| "Quit You" (2017) | "Look at Us Now" (2017) | "First Love" (2017) |

Ally Brooke singles chronology
| "Look at Us Now" (2017) | "Perfect" (2018) |

ASAP Ferg singles chronology
| "East Coast" (2017) | "Look at Us Now" (2017) | "Plain Jane" (2017) |

"Look at Us Now" is a song by American DJs Lost Kings, featuring singer Ally Brooke and rapper ASAP Ferg. The song is Brooke's first solo single outside Fifth Harmony. "Look at Us Now" was remixed by Kaidro.

== Background ==
The official lyric video was released on June 9, 2017. The song was described as a "summer jam, featuring sun-kissed guitar strumming, warm bass pads and bright '80s synths."

== Charts ==
| Chart (2017) | Peak position |
|---|---|
| US Hot Dance/Electronic Songs (Billboard) | 30 |
| Sweden Heatseeker (Sverigetopplistan) | 12 |

== Release history ==
| Region | Date | Format | Label | Ref. |
|---|---|---|---|---|
| Australia | June 9, 2017 | Digital download | Disruptor; RCA | |
| United Kingdom | June 9, 2017 | Digital download | Disruptor; RCA | |
| United States | June 9, 2017 | Digital download | Disruptor; RCA | |
