= Red Light Green Light (song) =

2021 single by DaBaby

Single by DaBaby
- Released: June 25, 2021
- Length: 2:40
- Label: South Coast Music Group; Interscope
- Songwriters: Jonathan Kirk; David Doman
- Producer: D.A. Got That Dope

DaBaby singles chronology
| "Ball If I Want To" (2021) | "Red Light Green Light" (2021) | "Demon" (2021) |

Music video
- "Red Light Green Light" on YouTube

"Red Light Green Light" is a single by American rapper DaBaby. It was released on June 25, 2021, with an accompanying music video. It was produced by D.A. Got That Dope. The song contains a flute instrumental with snares.

== Critical reception ==
Tom Breihan of Stereogum wrote that the track is a "heedlessly energetic" song, and compared it to DaBaby's song previous single "Ball If I Want To", calling it a "fast rap banger". Regina Cho of Revolt wrote that DaBaby "includes plenty of bars that play off the theme the title".

== Music video ==
The music video, directed by DaBaby himself, sees him in a backyard with a barbecue, and also donning Oakland Raiders (now Las Vegas Raiders) merchandise. It references the films Boyz n the Hood and The Nutty Professor.

== Charts ==
Chart performance for "Red Light Green Light"
| Chart (2021) | Peak position |
|---|---|
| Canada Hot 100 (Billboard) | 50 |
| Global 200 (Billboard) | 74 |
| New Zealand Hot Singles (RMNZ) | 14 |
| US Billboard Hot 100 | 50 |
| US Hot R&B/Hip-Hop Songs (Billboard) | 19 |
