= Kyoto (Tyga album) =

- Uncensored version of the album cover.

Studio album by Tyga
- Released: February 16, 2018
- Genres: R&B; pop
- Length: 52:02
- Labels: Last Kings; EMPIRE
- Producers: BatGangBeats; Bnchy; CashMoneyAP; Hitmaka; iDBeatz; Jess Jackson; LTTB; Nick Fouryn; Smash David; Ty Rose

Tyga chronology
BitchImTheShit2 (2017)	Kyoto (2018)	Legendary (2019)

Singles from Kyoto
- 1. "Boss Up" Released: October 4, 2017; 2. "Temperature" Released: December 22, 2017

Kyoto is the sixth studio album by American rapper Tyga. It was released on February 16, 2018, by Last Kings Records and Empire Distribution. The album features guest appearances from 24hrs, Gucci Mane, Kyndall and Tory Lanez.

== Background ==
Tyga announced the album's release date and cover art on January 22, 2018, via his Twitter account. The rapper has teased that the album will be a departure from his rapping style and will be more of a singing focused album and personal than his previous works:

"I been wanting to make this album for a while now but didn’t have the confidence an the story to express my true emotions. I thank all the love an support you have given me over the years".

== Artwork ==
The cover art for the album was illustrated by Japanese artist Hajime Sorayama. It features a fully nude tiger-woman, posing in a provocative manner, over a background in the style of the Japanese flag. The artwork was met with negative receptions from general public and critics alike, who called the image "vulgar" and "disrespectful" to Japanese culture.

== Singles ==
Kyoto's lead single "Boss Up" was released on October 4, 2017. The second single "Temperature" was released on December 22, 2017.

== Critical reception ==
Professional ratings
Review scores
Source	Rating
Crack	4/10
HipHopDX	2.7/5
Pitchfork	3.3/10

The album received negative reviews from music critics. Scott Glaysher of HipHopDX said that "Kyoto proves that Tyga should stick to rapping" and that "His fearlessness is commended but on the scale of experiment albums, Kyoto is much closer in quality to Lil Wayne’s forgettable Rebirth album than to Kanye’s striking 808s & Heartbreak". Crack's writer Chris Kelly criticized Tyga's vocal performance and his songwriting reviewing the album, saying that "For all his talk of "singing", Tyga sometimes struggles to sustain the melodies, sounding unsure himself about whether or not this was a good idea. Never particularly skilled as a lyricist, here he provides plenty of cringe-worthy moments". Torii MacAdams of Pitchfork said that the album is a "quasi-introspective R&B album" and "suffers from an almost total lack of imagination".

== Track listing ==
Credits adapted from BMI.

Kyoto track listing
No.	Title	Writer(s)	Producer(s)	Length
1.	"Temperature"	Michael Stevenson; L Williams; Joseph Epperson; Alexander Edwards	LTTB	3:20
2.	"Leather in the Rain" (featuring Kyndall)	Stevenson; Kyndall Ferguson; Edwards	Crakwav	3:33
3.	"Come and Ball Wit Me"	Stevenson; Edwards		3:28
4.	"Boss Up"	Stevenson; Jess Reed Jackson; Edwards	Jess Jackson	3:46
5.	"U Cry"	Stevenson; Edwards	iDBeatz	4:23
6.	"King of the Jungle"	Stevenson; Edwards; Vincent Davis II	Bnchy	4:53
7.	"Hard2Look"	Stevenson; Ty Rose; Edwards; Michael Allison	Ty Rose	3:41
8.	"I Need a Girl, Pt. 3"	Stevenson; Alex Petit	CashMoneyAP	3:33
9.	"Train 4 This"	Stevenson; Edwards	LTTB	3:25
10.	"Hot Soup"	Stevenson; Edwards		3:23
11.	"Sip a Lil" (featuring Gucci Mane)	Stevenson; Radric Delantic Davis; Petit; Edwards	CashMoneyAP; BatGangBeats	4:38
12.	"Faithful" (featuring Tory Lanez)	Stevenson; Daystar Shemuel Shua Peterson; Edwards	iDBeatz	4:06
13.	"Ja Rule & Ashanti"	Stevenson; Epperson; Edwards		3:20
14.	"Holdin On" (featuring 24hrs)	Stevenson; Robert Dozier Davis III; Christian Ward; Floyd Eugene Bentley III; Christopher Phyromm Washington; Melvin Moore	Smash David; Nick Fouryn; Hitmaka	2:32
Total length:				52:02

== Charts ==
Chart (2018)	Peak position
New Zealand Heatseeker Albums (RMNZ)	2
US R&B/Hip-Hop Album Sales (Billboard)	39
