= Nessly =

- Born: Maclean Porter; January 14, 1995 (age 31); Brooklyn, New York
- Origin: Atlanta, Georgia
- Genres: Hip hop
- Occupations: Rapper; singer; songwriter
- Years active: 2007–present
- Labels: Universal (former); StreamCut (former); Riveting Music

Maclean Porter (born January 14, 1995), better known by his stage name Nessly, is an American rapper, singer, and songwriter from Brooklyn, New York. He is best known for his 2018 studio album Wildflower, released on Republic Records, and his collaborations with artists such as Lil Yachty and Joji. His music incorporates elements of melodic rap and trap, often making use of autotune.

== Biography ==
Nessly began attracting attention in 2016 after his music was featured on Drake's OVO Sound Radio, which helped him gain an initial following. That same year, he released the project Still Finessin and the single "Crying in Codeine," which further expanded his audience. Since then, he has collaborated with artists including Lil Yachty, Joji, and Ski Mask the Slump God.

== Nominations ==
In 2021, Porter was credited with providing vocals on Lil Nas X's single "Industry Baby," featuring Jack Harlow. The song was later nominated for Best Melodic Rap Performance at the 64th Annual Grammy Awards.

In 2017, Nessly was nominated for the XXL Freshman.

== Music ==
In a 2018 interview with Billboard, Nessly cited Lil Wayne, Drake, and Kanye West as influences on his music. He also stated that he does not write lyrics in advance, explaining that "everything is off the dome." Some of the songs on his debut studio album Wildflower were produced by TM88.

Nessly released his follow-up album Standing on Satan's Chest in 2019. In interviews, he described the project as addressing themes of adversity and judgment.

== Albums ==
- Still Finessin' 2016
- Solo Boy Band 2016
- Wildflower 2018
- Standing On Satan's Chest (2019)
