= Swish (song) =

2018 single by American rapper Tyga

Single by Tyga

from the album Legendary
- Released: July 25, 2018
- Genre: West Coast hip-hop; trap
- Length: 3:14
- Label: Last Kings; Empire
- Songwriters: Micheal Stevenson; Terrelle Gallo; David Doman; Cameron Forbes
- Producer: D. A. Doman

Tyga singles chronology
"Kream" (2018)	"Swish" (2018)	"Swap Meet" (2018)

Music video
- "SWISH" on YouTube

"Swish" (stylized in all uppercase) is a song by the American rapper Tyga from his seventh album Legendary. It was released by Last Kings Music and Empire Distribution on July 25, 2018, the album's second single. The song samples David Banner's 2005 single, "Play".

== Charts ==
Chart (2018)	Peak position
Canada Hot 100 (Billboard)	58
Switzerland (Schweizer Hitparade)	76
UK Singles (Official Charts)	47
US Bubbling Under Hot 100 (Billboard)	2
US Hot R&B/Hip-Hop Songs (Billboard)	44

== Certifications ==
Region	Certification	Certified units/sales
Denmark (IFPI Danmark)	Gold	45,000^{‡}
United Kingdom (BPI)	Silver	200,000^{‡}
United States (RIAA)	Platinum	1,000,000^{‡}
^{‡} Sales+streaming figures based on certification alone.
