= Messiah (rapper) =

Dominican Latin trap artist

- Also known as: El Artista; Young Messi; El Monito
- Born: Benito Emmanuel Garcia; June 8, 1990 (age 36); Santiago de los Caballeros, Dominican Republic
- Genre: Latin trap
- Occupations: Rapper; singer; songwriter

Benito Emmanuel Garcia, better known as Messiah, is a Dominican rapper and singer raised in Harlem, New York City. He is known for being a bilingual artist, singing in both Spanish and English.

== Origin ==
Messiah was born in Santiago de los Caballeros in the Dominican Republic and the age of two, moved to the Hamilton Heights, Manhattan, section of Harlem in New York City. He is a descendant of Dominican National Hero Fernando Valerio. He was inspired by artist such as José José and Isabel Pantoja. He wrote his first song at the age of 11, but didn't have fame until he formed the duo with fellow rapper Tali Goya called Tali & Messiah. In 2010, he split the duo going solo. Messiah's solo material first caught the Internet's attention when he made Spanish remixes of Drake and Future, as well as with the song "Tu Protagonista". He is described as one of the pioneers of the Latin trap movement.

In 2017, Messiah collaborated with American rapper Cardi B for a remix of her hit single "Bodak Yellow", which reached number one on the US Billboard Hot 100 chart. Dubbed the "Latin Trap Remix", it was officially issued on August 18, 2017. The song features Cardi B rapping in Spanish and includes vocals from Dominican hip hop recording artist Messiah, who contributed a guest verse.
