= Lost Kings =

American DJ duo

- Origin: Los Angeles, US
- Genres: Progressive house; melodic house; bass house; future bass
- Occupations: DJ; record producer; remixer; songwriter
- Instrument: Digital audio workstation
- Years active: 2014–present
- Labels: Disruptor Records; RCA Records
- Members: Robert Abisi (Rob Gainley); Nick Shanholtz (Dr. No)
- Website: www.wearelostkings.com

Lost Kings are an American DJ duo consisting of Robert Abisi and Nick Shanholtz, based in Los Angeles. The duo gained popularity beginning in 2014 through their official remixes for artists such as Imagine Dragons, Krewella, Halsey, Vance Joy, Echosmith, Rihanna, and Tori Kelly, and through their original progressive house music. Managed by Disruptor Management, a joint venture at Sony Music Entertainment, they signed to Disruptor Records/RCA Records in October 2016.

== Biography ==
=== Formation ===
DJ Robert Abisi (also known as Rob Gainley), was born in Boston, Massachusetts and Nick Shanholtz (also known as Dr. No) a writer, producer, and multi-instrumentalist, was born in Baltimore, Maryland. The two met through a mutual friend and started the project when the duo talked about collaborating in music on Abisi's 25th birthday in 2014. The duo begin using 'Lost Kings' as a stage name because they 'felt lost' moving to Los Angeles and had goals they wanted to accomplish.

=== Members ===
==== Robert Abisi ====
Abisi grew up in Andover, Massachusetts and initially had dreams to become a professional athlete but was always surrounded by music. After realizing the ambition was very unlikely to become true, he became a DJ and producer. He was able to meet many of his favorite musical artists, such as Coldplay, at a young age because his father worked in the radio industry. In school, he started music blogs to introduce people to new music. When he was 19 years old, his parents bought him a DJ controller for Christmas as they realized about his musical passion. The year after that, he found out that his father was diagnosed with throat cancer when he was about to leave for a 'study-abroad' program in London. Just like that, he was in London, his aunt died due to cancer and his grandmother's husband too died. His father had been cancer-free since December 2009. He graduated from James Madison University in Virginia in 2011 and moved to Los Angeles. He wanted to pursue a musical career as a solo artist and had tried to book DJ gigs.

==== Nick Shanholtz ====
Shanholtz grew up on the East Coast and in Baltimore, Maryland. He wanted to become a professional musician (specifically, drummer in a band). He started playing the drums when he was 8 years old. He began playing the piano and guitar at 15 and realized he wanted to write and produce music. He went to Patapsco High School and Center for the Arts, and later went to Berklee College of Music in Boston. In 2010, he moved to Los Angeles to enroll in the LA Recording School. Upon arrival in LA, he had struggled to make friends until he met Abisi and surrounded himself with the right people.

== Career ==
=== 2014–2015 ===
Lost Kings was launched in 2014 by members Robert Abisi and Nick Shanholtz. They were signed to Disruptor Management, a joint venture by Sony Music and were managed by Adam Alpert and Enes Kolenovic who represented Disruptor Management. They started the project by releasing remixes, in the progressive house genre before shifting to a more 'groove-tinged' sound. The duo sent their first remix to many record companies and received their first response from Alpert of Disruptor Records, prior to their signing to the label. Disruptor agreed with their visions of establishing themselves as artists with remixes before producing original songs. When asked about their diverse musical style, Shanholtz said they didn't want to be only recognized in a particular genre as that would make them 'predictable'. The duo attributed their success to Hype Machine, stating that their music received a lot of plays from the music blog aggregator. They started to gain recognition when their remix of Disclosure's "Latch" was played on the radio.

They first achieved prominence in 2014 when their unofficial remix of Disclosure's "Latch" [feat. Sam Smith] was placed in regular rotation on Sirius/XM's BPM ("Beats Per Minute") Dance/Electronic channel, replacing the original. Billboard premiered their official remix of Imagine Dragons' "I Bet My Life" (#28 on the US Billboard Hot 100) on January 26, 2015, noting at the time that "[w]ith 20 native records living on their SoundCloud page, along with a few guest mixes sprinkled in, the Lost Kings’ diligent work ethic in the studio has translated to excellent streaming numbers and a multitude of radio spins.

They released their debut EP "The Bad" through Spinnin' Records.

Their debut on Spinnin' Records, "Bad" (feat. Jessame), entered Spotify's Global Viral Chart at No. 15 and gained over 4.7 million streams on Spotify and one million video views. Premiering the "Bad" single on Sept. 23, 2015, Idolator described their "year spent touring and remixing artists as varied as Tori Kelly, Imagine Dragons and Vance Joy." Their single "You" (feat. Katelyn Tarver), from their 2015 The Bad EP, gained over two million video views and eight million streams on Spotify. Tracks from The Bad EP (Spinnin' Records) received over 15 million streams on Spotify. In October 2015 they released an official remix of Tori Kelly's Billboard Hot 100-charting "Should've Been Us".

=== 2016–present ===
By 2016, they had amassed 13 No. 1's on Hype Machine, over 30 million plays on Soundcloud, and over 25 million Spotify streams. Tracks from The Good EP (released March 3, 2016 on Spinnin' Records) received over four million streams on Spotify. They were tapped to create an official remix of Rihanna's Billboard Hot 100 chart-topping "Work" (feat. Drake).

In October 2016 they signed to Disruptor Records/RCA Records, releasing the single "Phone Down" (feat. Emily Warren) to mark the occasion. The track reached Billboard's Twitter Emerging Artists chart and was No. 5 on Spotify's Top Ten most viral tracks for the week of Oct. 7 - Oct. 13.

On tour, the duo has appeared at a variety of festivals including 'Billboard's Hot 100 Festival (2016), EDC (Electric Daisy Carnival) N.Y. (2016), Moonrise Festival (2016), Sunset Music Festival (2016), Hangout Music Fest (2016), Crush (2015), Summer of Sound (2016), Landstreff Stavanger (2016), Hellow Festival (2016) and Made in America Festival (2018)

On June 9, 2017, they released "Look At Us Now" as a single featuring singer Ally Brooke and rapper ASAP Ferg.

In March 2018, the Lost Kings had their debut performance at Ultra Music Festival in Bayfront Park, Miami.

In June 2021, the Lost Kings performed at Todd & Connor's rooftop birthday party in New York City.

== Discography ==
=== Extended plays ===
Title	Extended play details
The Bad	Released: October 23, 2015; Label: Spinnin'; Format: Digital download
The Good	Released: March 11, 2016; Label: Spinnin'; Format: Digital download
Paper Crowns	Released: January 4, 2019; Label: Disruptor, RCA; Format: Digital download, streaming
We Are Lost Kings (Japan EP)	Released: September 27, 2019 (Japan); Label: Disruptor, RCA; Format: Digital download, streaming
Lost Angeles	Released: October 25, 2019; Label: Disruptor, RCA; Format: Digital download, streaming
It's Not You, It's Me	Released: December 10, 2021; Label: Disruptor, RCA; Format: Digital download, streaming

=== Singles ===
List of singles as lead artist, with selected chart positions, showing year released and album name
Title	Year	Peak chart positions		Certifications	Album/EP
Title	Year	US Dance	SWE	Certifications	Album/EP
"Bad" (featuring Jessame)	2015	—	—		The Bad EP
"You" (featuring Katelyn Tarver)	2015	—	—		The Bad EP
"Phone Down" (featuring Emily Warren)	2016	25	—	RIAA: Gold	Non-album single
"Quit You" (featuring Tinashe)	2017	32	—		We Are Lost Kings (Japan EP)
"Look at Us Now" (featuring Ally Brooke and A$AP Ferg)	2017	30	—		We Are Lost Kings (Japan EP)
"First Love" (featuring Sabrina Carpenter)	2017	26	—		We Are Lost Kings (Japan EP)
"Don't Call"	2017	41	—		Non-album single
"When We Were Young" (featuring Norma Jean Martine)	2018	36	—		Paper Crowns
"Drunk As Hell" (featuring Jesper Jenset)	2018	—	—		Paper Crowns
"Stuck" (featuring Tove Styrke)	2018	—	58		Paper Crowns
"Don't Kill My High" (featuring Wiz Khalifa and Social House)	2019	21	—		Paper Crowns
"Anti-Everything" (with Loren Gray)	2019	32	—		Paper Crowns
"Too Far Gone" (featuring Anna Clendening)	2019	—	—		Lost Angeles
"Try" (featuring Safe)	2019	—	—		Lost Angeles
"Ain't the Same" (featuring Cxloe)	2019	—	—		Lost Angeles
"LA & the Parties" (featuring Sevyn Streeter and Luh Kel)	2019	48	—		Lost Angeles
"Somebody Out There" (featuring Marc E. Bassy)	2019	—	—		Lost Angeles
"Hurt" (featuring DeathbyRomy)	2020	47	—		It's Not You, It's Me
"Oops (I'm Sorry)" (featuring Ty Dolla Sign and Gashi)	2020	21	—		It's Not You, It's Me
"Mountains" (featuring Masn)	2020	—	—		It's Not You, It's Me
"Runaway" (featuring Destiny Rogers)	2020	—	—		It's Not You, It's Me
"I Miss the Future" (featuring Jordan Shaw)	2021	39	—		It's Not You, It's Me
"Me Myself & Adderall" (featuring Goody Grace)	2021	27	—		It's Not You, It's Me
"Broken in All the Right Places" (featuring Mod Sun)	2021	16	—		It's Not You, It's Me
"Under the Influence" (featuring Jordan Shaw)	2022	—	—		Non-album singles
"Save Me" (featuring Kiddo AI)	2022	—	—		Non-album singles
"I Do" (featuring Slush Puppy)	2022	—	—		Non-album singles
"Wonderlust"	2022	—	—		Non-album singles
"Dreams" (featuring Frawley)	2023	—	—		Non-album singles
"Remind Me" (featuring Hilda)	2023	—	—		Non-album singles
"Here for You" (featuring Kheela)	2024	—	—		Non-album singles
"—" denotes a recording that did not chart or was not released in that territory.

=== Remixes ===
==== 2014 ====
- The Killers – "Human"
- Local Natives – "Black Balloons"
- Oliver Heldens – "Gecko"
- Wild Cub – "Colour"
- Dirty South – "Unbreakable"
- Hayley Kiyoko – "This Side of Paradise"
- Disclosure featuring Sam Smith – "Latch"

==== 2015 ====
- Imagine Dragons – "I Bet My Life"
- Halsey – "Ghost"
- Vance Joy – "Wasted Time"
- Thief – "Crazy"
- Coasts – "Modern Love"
- Gorgon City – "Coming Home"
- Echosmith – "Bright"
- Mako – "I Won't Let You Walk Away"
- Saint Motel – "Cold Cold Man"
- Cazzette – "Together"
- Rozes – "R U Mine"
- Diplo & Sleepy Tom – "Be Right There"
- Krewella – "Somewhere to Run"
- Tori Kelly – "Should've Been Us"

==== 2016 ====
- G-Eazy and Bebe Rexha – "Me, Myself & I"
- Cardiknox – "On My Way"
- Rihanna featuring Drake – "Work"

==== 2019 ====
- Katy Perry - "Small Talk"
