= TM88 production discography =

The discography of American record producer, TM88. It includes a list of songs produced, co-produced and remixed by year, artists, album and title.

== 2012 ==
=== Waka Flocka Flame - Triple F Life: Friends, Fans & Family ===
- 10. "Lurkin (feat. Plies)

=== DJ Drama - Quality Street Music ===
- 08. "I'ma Hata (feat Waka Flocka Flame and Tyler, The Creator and D-Bo)

== 2013 ==
=== Fredo Santana - Fredo Krueger ===
- 05. "Rollie On My Wrist"

=== Gucci Mane - Trap God 2 ===
- 10. "Squad Car (feat. Big Bank Black & OG Boo Dirty)"

=== Gucci Mane - Trap House III ===
- 01. "Traphouse 3 (feat. Rick Ross)" (Produced with Southside)
- 10. "Darker (feat. Chief Keef)" (Produced with Southside)

=== Gucci Mane & 808 Mafia - World War 3: Gas ===
- 01. "One Minute"
- 04. "Geekin (feat. Waka Flocka Flame)"
- 08. "Match Maker"
- 13. "Rather Be (feat. Keyshia Dior)"

=== Gucci Mane & Metro Boomin - World War 3: Molly ===
- 09. "Don't Look At Me (feat. Young Thug)"
- 14. "You A Drug"

=== Gucci Mane - The State vs. Radric Davis II: The Caged Bird Sings ===
- 07. "Bad Bitch" (Produced with Southside)
- 10. "Wish You Was Me" (Produced with Bankroll Clay)

=== Future & Free Bands Gang - Future Presents: F.B.G. The Movie ===
- 05. "Mark McGwire"
- 03. "Ceelo (feat. Wale)" (Produced with Southside)
- 09. "Chosen One (feat. Rocko)"
- 12. "DNA"
- 15. "Keep On Shining (feat. Casino)"
- 19. "You Wonder (feat. Busta Rhymes & Rocko)"
- 17. "Finessin" (Produced with Southside)

=== DJ Esco - Black Woodstock Soundtrack ===
- 06. "Take This 4 Granted" (feat. Future)

=== DJ Esco - No Sleep ===
- 03. "Day One (feat. Future & Yo Gotti)" (Produced with Metro Boomin)
- 07. "Club On Smash (feat. Future)"

=== Chief Keef - Where He Get it (Single) ===
- "Where He Get it" (Produced with Metro Boomin, Southside & Sonny Digital)

=== Casino - Ex Drug Dealer ===
- 05. "Done It All (feat. Young Scooter & Marco)"
- 14. "Keep On Shinin (feat. Future)" (Produced with Southside)

=== Ace Hood - Trials & Tribulations ===
- 10. "Pray for Me" (Produced with Metro Boomin, Sonny Digital & Southside)

== 2014 ==
=== Bankroll Fresh - Life of a Hot Boy ===
- 17. "Come Wit It"

=== Tracy T - The Wolf of all Streets ===
- 02. "On Me (feat. Meek Mill)"
- 03. "No Reason (feat. Que)"
- 09. "Champagne"

=== iLoveMakonnen - I Love Makonnen EP ===
- 07. "Exclusive" (Produced with Metro Boomin & Southside)

=== Future - Monster ===
- 07. "After That (feat. Lil Wayne)" (Produced with Southside)
- 11. "Fetti" (Produced with Metro Boomin & Southside)
- 14. "Showed Up" (Produced with DJ Spinz)
- 16. "Codeine Crazy"

=== Young Thug & Bloody Jay - Black Portland ===
- 04. "No Fucks" (Produced with Southside)

=== Young Thug - Diary of a Stoner ===
- 10. "Every Morning (feat. Skooly)"
- 12. "Eww" (Produced with Southside)

=== Young Thug - Ready for War ===
- 10. "Cash Talk" (Produced with Metro Boomin)

=== Wiz Khalifa - 28 Grams ===
- 03. "Let'R" (Produced with Metro Boomin & Southisde)
- 22. "How To Be Real (feat. Curtis Williams)" (Produced with Southside)

=== Travis Porter - Music Money Magnums ===
- 06. "No Understanding"

=== Rocko - Ignant ===
- 03. "Get The Fuck Outta Here"
- 06. "Disrespectful" (Produced with MP808)
- 13. "LUV" (Produced with Smurf)

=== Rocko - Expect The Unexpected ===
- 07. "Good (feat. Lil Wayne)" (Produced with MP808)

=== Rocko - Poet ===
- 04. "Phenomenal Woman" (Produced with Smurf)

=== Rocko - FOOD ===
- 08. "B.A.N.A.N.A.S." (Produced with MP808 and Tazzaracci)

=== Que - Jungle Fever (Single) ===
- 01. "Jungle Fever"

=== Que & Mike Fresh - Que Fresco ===
- 04. "Yes Men"

=== Migos - Rich Nigga Timeline ===
- 07. "Pop That"

=== Migos - Trouble (Single) ===
- "Trouble (feat. T.I.)" (Produced with MP808)

=== Hoodrich Pablo Juan - Designer Drugz ===
- 03. "Trap Dab (feat. Migos, Jose Guapo & Peewee Longway)"

=== LL Cool J - Break Your Face ===
- 01. "Break Your Face" (Produced with Southside)

=== K Camp - In Due Time ===
- 04. "Oh No"

=== Young Thug - Boy (How To Be Real) ===
- 01. "Boy (How To Be Real) (feat. Wiz Khalifa)" (Produced with Southside)

=== Gucci Mane - East Atlanta Santa ===
- 06. "Maybe it's the Juice"
- 11. "One Min " (Produced with Southside)

=== Future - Honest ===
- 10. "Special (feat. Young Scooter)" (Produced with Southside)

=== Doe B - D.O.A.T. 3 ===
- 16. "Da Truth" (Produced with M16)

=== Cash Out - Juice (Remix) (Single) ===
- "Juice (Remix) (feat. Lil Durk)" (Produced with Southside)

=== Shad Da God - Xans (Single) ===
- 01. "Xans"

=== Chaz Gotti - Wait'n ===
- 04. "Porsche"
- 07. "Jeweler (feat. Cash Out)" (Produced with Southside)

== 2015 ==
=== French Montana - Casino Life 2 ===
- 03. "Moses (Feat. Chris Brown & Migos)" (Produced with Southside, DJ Spinz & K Major)
- 07. "5 Mo (Feat. Travi$ Scott & Lil Durk) (Produced with MP808)
- 12. "All Hustle No Work (Feat. will.i.am & Lil Durk)" (Produced with Southside)

=== Young Dolph - High Class Street Music 5 ===
- 01. "3 Way"
- 18. "The Plug Best Friend"

=== Sy Ari Da Kid - Street Damage ===
- 04. "Watching (by Sierra Leone, featuring Sy Ari Da Kid)"

=== Tracy T - 50 Shades of Green ===
- 03. "Shoot Em Up"

=== Wiz Khalifa ===
- "Decisions"

=== 21 Savage - The Slaughter Tape ===
- 06. "Drip" (Produced with Metro Boomin)

=== Juicy J - 100% Juice ===
- 08. "Tap Back"
- 10. "Details" (Produced with Lex Luger)
- 12. "Film (Remix) (feat. Future, Boosie Badazz & G.O.D.)" (Produced with Felli Fel & Young Chop)

=== Juicy J - O's to Oscars ===
- 05. "Yeah Nigga"
- 08. "Up (feat. Wiz Khalifa & Project Pat)"
- 09. "Beef"
- 14. "You And I (feat. Ty Dolla $ign)" (Produced with Southside and MP808)

=== Gucci Mane - King Gucci ===
- 10. "I'm Too Much (feat. Riff Raff)"

=== Gucci Mane - Dinner ===
- 03. "Angry (feat. Lil Reese & Fredo Santana)"
- 07. "Play with your Children" (feat. Fredo Santana) (Produced with Southside)

=== Gucci Mane - Trapology ===
- 03. "Young Niggas (feat. Jadakiss & Fetty Wap)"

=== Travis Scott - Rodeo ===
- 07. "Nightcrawler (feat. Swae Lee of Rae Sremmurd & Chief Keef" (Produced with Metro Boomin, Southside, Mike Dean and Allen Ritter)

=== DJ Outta Space - Thug Ciity - Single ===
- Thug Ciity (feat. Young Sizzle, TM88, NephewTexasBoy, Spiiker, Ethan Sacii, and Spihug City)

=== Travis Scott ===
- "Nothing but Net (feat. Young Thug & PartyNextDoor)" (Produced with Southside, Boi-1da & Frank Dukes)

=== DJ Outta Space - Thug Ciity (Remix) - Single ===
- Thug Ciity (Remix) (feat. 2 Chainz, K Camp & Quavo)

=== Drake - If You're Reading This It's Too Late ===
- 14. "Company (feat. Travis Scott)" (Produced with Southside, WondaGurl, Travis Scott & Allen Ritter)

=== 2 Chainz - Trap-A-Velli 3 ===
- 10. "Big Meech Era"

=== Young Jeezy - Church in These Streets ===
- 08. "God" (Produced with Southside)

=== PartyNextDoor ===
- "Party At 8"

=== Wiz Khalifa - Cabin Fever 3 ===
- 01. "Respect (feat. K Camp & Juicy J)"
- 05. "Shit Starters (feat. 2 Chainz)

=== Team Eastside Snoop ===
- "Chicken Up"

=== Waka Flocka Flame - Flockaveli 1.5 ===
- 01. "Shootin" (Produced with Southside)
- 02. "Short Handed (feat. Chaz Gotti)" (Produced with Southside)
- 09. "Feel About Me" (Produced with Southside)"

=== Reese (rapper) - Jump Off a Building ===
- 01. "Yesterday"
- 02. "Lobby Party (feat. Rich Homie Quan)"
- 03. "Old Skool (feat. Kari Faux)"
- 05. "Freestyle"

=== SluggMania - Nintendo 88 ===
- 01. "Revo"
- 02. "Cartridge"
- 03. "Addies"
- 04. "My Brother & Me"
- 05. "Nintendo"

=== KEY! - Screaming Dreams: The Prelude ===
- 02. "50 Round Drums (feat. 21 Savage)" (Produced with Metro Boomin & Sonny Digital)

=== Peewee Longway - Money, Pounds & Ammunition 2 ===
- 05. "Catch Up (feat. Muddgod)"

=== Young Thug - Slime Season 2 ===
- 16. "Oh Lord" (Produced with Ricky Racks)

=== Lil Uzi Vert - Luv Is Rage ===
- 09. "Queso" (feat. Wiz Khalifa) (Produced with Wheezy)

== 2016 ==
=== Project Pat - Street God 2 ===
- 04. "Catching Juggs"

=== Zach Farlow - The Great Escape 2 ===
- 12. "Truth" (Produced with London on da Track)

=== Icewear Vezzo - Moonwalken ===
- 02. "MoonWalken"
- 05. "Pints & You"

=== Juicy J - Lit in Ceylon ===
- 02. "Mansion"
- 03. "Blue Bently"
- 04. "ACT" (Produced with Smash David)
- 06. "Back Out"
- 08. "Green Carpet"
- 13. "Ol Skool"

=== Juicy J, Wiz Khalifa & TM88 - TGOD Mafia: Rude Awakening ===
- 01. "TGOD Mafia intro"
- 02. "Da Power"
- 03. "Medication"
- 04. "Where Was You"
- 05. " All Night"
- 06. "I See It I Want It" (produced with Cubeatz)
- 07. "Hit Me Up"
- 08. "Green Suicide"
- 09. "Bossed Up" (produced with Cubeatz)
- 10. "She In Love" (produced with Cubeatz)
- 11. "Breaking News (Feat. Project Pat)
- 12. "Itself"
- 13. "Luxury Flow"
- 14. "Stay The Same" (produced with Cubeatz)
- 15. "On The Way"
- 16. "Cell Ready" (produced with Cubeatz)

=== Wiz Khalifa - Khalifa ===
- 06. "Bake Sale (feat. Travis Scott)" (Produced with Juicy J, Lex Luger, DJ Spinz & Crazy Mike)

=== Wiz Khalifa - Rolling Papers 2 ===
- "Pull Up (feat. Lil Uzi Vert)" (Produced with Ricky P)

=== Peewee Longway - Mr. Blue Benjamin ===
- 14. "Jackie Tan (feat. Juicy J & Wiz Khalifa)" (Produced with Deedotwill)

=== Fredo Santana - Fredo Mafia ===
- 07. "Mafia Talk" (Produced with Metro Boomin)

=== Ethan Sacii - Dirty Glove Bastard 3 ===
- 13. "No Date (feat. Tabius Tate)"
- 16. "LA"

=== Future - Evol ===
- 07. "Seven Rings" (Produced with MP808)

=== HLVDNI ===
- Kizo ima Manjaču (produced with Gezin)

=== Shad Da God - Free the Goat ===
- 01. "Wut I Luv"

=== T Shyne - Trip Trap EP ===
- "Andre 3K"

=== Team Eastside Snoop ===
- "I Be Tripping"

=== YFN Lucci - Wish Me Well 2 ===
- 02. "YFN"
- 04. "Woke Up Boss"

=== 2 Chainz - Felt Like Cappin and ColleGrove ===
- 04. "Not Invited" [Felt Like Cappin]
- 07. "Not Invited" (produced with Reignman Rich) [ColleGrove]

=== 2 Chainz - Daniel Son; Necklace Don ===
- 02. "Get Out The Bed"

=== Young Thug - Jeffery ===
- 01. "Wyclef Jean" (Produced with Supah Mario)
- 02. "Floyd Mayweather (feat. Travis Scott, Gucci Mane & Gunna)" (Produced with Wheezy, Billboard Hitmakers & Goose)
- 04. "Future Swag"
- 06. "Guwop (feat. Quavo, Offset & Young Scooter)" (Produced with Wheezy & Cassius Jay)

=== Travis Scott - Birds in the Trap Sing McKnight ===
- 03. "coordinate" (Produced with Cubeatz)

=== Juicy J - Rubba Band Business: The Album ===
- "No English (feat. Travis Scott)" (Produced with Lex Luger)
- "Ballin (feat. Kanye West)" (Produced with Cubeatz)

=== Travis Scott ===
- "RaRa (feat. Lil Uzi Vert)" (produced with Cubeatz)

=== TM88 - Been Thru a Lot - Single ===
- "Been Thru a Lot (feat. Young Thug and Lil Yachty)" (Produced with Supah Mario)

=== Juicy J - #MUSTBENICE ===
- 01. "Trap (featuring Gucci Mane and Peewee Longway)" (Produced with Lex Luger)
- 04. "Feeling Like Obama"
- 05. "Lotto" (produced with Cubeatz)
- 06. "Whatcha Gone Do" (produced with Cubeatz)
- 08. "I Wonder"
- 09. "Lou Will"
- 11. "Super Fire"
- 12. "Panties (featuring Jeremih)" (produced with Cubeatz)
- 13. "What I Call It"
- 15. "Outro"

=== Taylor Gang - TGOD Vol. 1 ===
- 04. "Come Through"

=== Gucci Mane - Woptober ===
- 02. "Aggressive" (Produced with Zaytoven)

=== Gucci Mane - The Return of East Atlanta Santa ===
- 07. "Crash"

=== Trinidad James - The Wake Up 2 ===
- 01. "Taylor Swift" (Feat. ILoveMakonnen & Peewee Longway)

== 2017 ==
=== Rich Gang - Single ===
- 00. "Bit Bak" (featuring Young Thug and Birdman)

=== Lil Donald - Still Here ===
- 06. "88" (produced with Cassius Jay)

=== Lil Uzi Vert - Luv is Rage 1.5 ===
- 03. "XO TOUR Llif3" (produced with JW Lucas)

=== Lil Baby - Perfect Timing ===
- 06. "100 Round" (featuring Lil Yachty) (produced with Wheezy)

=== Nessly -Wildflower ===
- 00. "Falling Down"
- 03. "Who Has It"

=== Big Boi - Boomiverse ===
- 04. "In The South" (featuring Gucci Mane and Pimp C) (Produced with Cory Mo)

=== YKOM - Year of the Young ===
- 08. "Flex"

=== Smokepurpp - Deadstar ===
- 12. "Hold It"

=== Smokepurpp ===
- Glock in My Benz

=== Lil Uzi Vert - Luv Is Rage 2 ===
- 16. "XO TOUR Llif3"
- 18. "Loaded"

=== Future & Young Thug - Super Slimey ===
- 13. "Group Home" (produced with Fuse)

=== Juicy J - Gas Face ===
- "One Of Them"

=== Lil Yachty & Nessly ===
- "Guacamole"

=== Roscoe Dash ===
- Ye's

=== Blac Youngsta ===
- Vent

=== Gucci Mane - Mr. Davis ===
- Enormous (featuring Ty Dolla Sign) (produced with OG Parker and Rex Kudo)
- Money Piling (produced with Southside)

=== Lil Pump - Lil Pump ===
- 09. Foreign

=== Lil Duke - Life In The Hills ===
- 09. Diamonds Dancing (featuring Young Thug) [Produced with Wheezy]

=== Gunna - Drip Season 2 ===
- 08. Make No Sense (featuring Lil Duke) [produced with Wheezy and Rex Kudo]

=== Moneybagg Yo - Heartless ===
- 02. Question

=== Moneybaggyo - Federal 3X ===
- 07. "Forreal"

=== Travis Scott & Quavo - Huncho Jack, Jack Huncho ===
- 04. "Motorcycle Patches" (produced with Southside, Supah Mario, Frank Dukes and Travis Scott)

=== Shy Glizzy - Quiet Storm ===
- 18. "Take Me Away" (produced with Rex Kudo)

=== 24Hrs - ILUVTPC V1 ===
- 09. "Bentley Coup" (featuring Smooky Margielaa) (produced with Rex Kudo)

=== Larry June ===
- "Off the Dribble" (Single)

== 2018 ==
=== Lil Uzi Vert ===
- "Mood" (produced with Southside and Supah Mario)

=== Ken Carson ===
- "Dream" (produced with MP808)

=== Kidd Kidd - Unquestionable ===
- 5. "Count on My Hand"

=== Wiz Khalifa ===
- "Best Life" (Single)

=== 24hrs ===
- "Loose Change" (Single) (with Jose Guapo)

=== G Herbo - Humble Beast (deluxe edition) ===
- 22. "No Depression" (produced with Southside)

=== Mexico Rann - Penguin Skin 2 ===
- 3. "By Myself" (featuring Young Thug)

=== Dyscaine - 80HD ===
- 7. "Don't Care" (produced with RG Reckless)

=== DJ Bandz - ChiLanta 4 ===
- 11. "I.C.W.N.T. (Freestyle)" (Future) (produced with Illmind)

=== Nessly - Wildflower ===
- 2. "Ungrateful" (produced with Take a Daytrip)
- 3. "WhoHasIt" (featuring Ski Mask the Slump God) (produced with CuBeatz)
- 8. "Not My Lover" (featuring Hoodrich Pablo Juan) (produced with MP808 and Take a Daytrip)
- 9. "Bunjee Jump! (Interlude)" (produced with CuBeatz and JW Lucas)
- 10. "Downers" (produced with Sid Sacii)
- 11. "Sorry Not Sorry" (produced with CuBeatz and Take a Daytrip)

=== Lil Trogan - Eazy ===
- 03. "Black Panther Freestyle" (produced with Southside and 808 Mafia)

=== Big Baby Scumbag ===
- "Hammer Time" (Single)

=== Lil Yachty - Lil Boat 2 ===
- 09. "Das Cap" (produced with Southside)

=== Jose Guapo - Lingo 2: The Return ===
- 06. "Cash Pronto" (featuring Offset)
- 10. "I Might Have Too" (featuring Derez De'Shon)
- 13. "Actin Up"

=== XXXTentacion - ? ===
- 09. "Going Down!" (produced with Tre Pounds)

=== Trouble - Edgewood ===
- 06. "Wuzzam, Wuzzup"

=== Cash Money Records - Before Anythang (soundtrack) ===
- 03. "Back Bone" (Young Thug) (produced with Wheezy)
- 11. "4Real" (Gucci Mane) (produced with Zaytoven)

=== Lil Durk - Just Cause Y'all Waited ===
- 03. "When I Was Little" (produced with DY Krazy)

=== Ufo361 - 808 ===
- 09. "Dream" (featuring Trettman) (produced with AT Beatz and DY Krazy)

=== YoungBoy Never Broke Again - Until Death Call My Name ===
- 12. "Public Figure" (produced with Wheezy)

=== Te$o - Shizos ===
- 05. "Wenn das Telefon klingelt" (produced with Fr1ny Beats)

=== Rae Sremmurd - SR3MM ===
- 08. "Rock N Roll Hall of Fame" (produced with MP808)

=== 24hrs ===
- "All I Know" (Single)

=== G Herbo and Southside - Swervo ===
- 02. "Swervo" (produced with Southside)
- 07. "Pac n Dre" (produced with Southside)
- 08. "Bonjour" (produced with Southside)

=== MadeinTYO ===
- "Switch It Up" (Single) (produced with Psymun, SinGrinch and Wheezy)

=== Wiz Khalifa - Rolling Papers 2 ===
- 01. "Hot Now" (produced with Bobby Raps)
- 04. "Very Special" (produced with Rockamore)
- 05. "Goin Hard"
- 06. "Holyfield"

=== Travis Scott - Astroworld ===
- "No Bystanders" (produced with Wondagurl, Mike Dean, David Stromberg and Gezin 808 Mafia)

== 2020 ==
=== Lil Uzi Vert - Eternal Atake ===
- P2

=== Roy Woods and Wiz Khalifa - solo hit ===
- So High

=== Moneybagg Yo - Time Served (Deluxe) ===
- Blue Jean Bandit

== 2022 ==
=== Future - I Never Liked You ===
- 1. "712pm" (produced with Moon, MoXart Beatz, Wheezy)
- 5. "Puffin on Zootiez" (produced with Nils, TooDope)
- 14. "The Way Things Going" (produced with Daan)

=== King Von - What It Means to Be King ===
- 13. "Hard to Trust" (produced with ATL Jacob, Too Dope, MP808)

== 2023 ==
=== Ken Carson - A Great Chaos ===
- 4. "Singapore" (produced with Lil 88, Nick Spiders, LBW)

== 2024 ==
=== BeezyB, Slimesito & Sn8ke - Only The Global ===
- 5. "LV Lenses"

== 2026 ==
=== Future – The Real Me ===
- 6. "Weight Up"
