= MadeinTYO discography =

Discography of the American rapper MadeinTYO

The discography of American rapper MadeinTYO consists of four studio albums, four mixtapes, two EPs and nine singles as a lead artist.

== Albums ==
Title	Details	Peak chart positions		
Title	Details	US	US R&B/HH	CAN
Sincerely, Tokyo	Released: October 26, 2018; Label: Privateclub; Format: Digital download, Vinyl	98	51	89
Never Forgotten	Released: October 30, 2020; Label: Privateclub, Commission; Format: Digital download, streaming	—	—	—
Neo TYO	Released: February 17, 2023; Label: Privateclub, Commission; Format: Digital download, streaming	—	—	—

== Mixtapes ==
List of mixtapes, showing selected details
Title	Details	Peak chart positions		
Title	Details	US	US R&B/HH	US Rap
You Are Forgiven	Released: April 27, 2016; Label: Privateclub, Warner Bros.; Format: Digital download	122	33	21
Thank You, Mr. Tokyo	Released: August 19, 2016; Label: Privateclub, Commission Records.; Format: Digital download	—	—	—
I Bet You Get This All the Time (with MyNamePhin)	Released: July 6, 2018; Label: Privateclub, Warner Bros.; Format: Digital download	—	—	—
Yokohama (with UnoTheActivist)	Released: December 10, 2021; Label: Self-released; Format: Digital download	—	—	—
"—" denotes a title that did not chart, or was not released in that territory.

== EPs ==
Title	EP details
24Hrs in Tokyo (with 24hrs)	Released: December 28, 2016; Label: Privateclub; Format: Digital download
True's World	Released: August 25, 2017; Label: Privateclub; Format: Digital download

== Singles ==
=== As lead artist ===
List of singles as lead artist, with selected chart positions
Title	Year	Peak chart positions			Certifications	Album
Title	Year	US	US R&B/HH	US Rap	Certifications	Album
"Uber Everywhere" (solo or featuring Travis Scott)	2016	51	16	11	RIAA: 2× Platinum	You Are Forgiven
"I Want" (solo or featuring 2 Chainz)	2016	—	—	—	RIAA: Platinum	You Are Forgiven
"Skateboard P" (solo or remix featuring Big Sean)	2016	— (Note: "Skateboard P" did not enter the Billboard Hot 100, but peaked at number two on the Bubbling Under Hot 100 Singles chart.)	42	—	RIAA: Platinum	Thank You, Mr Tokyo
"Ned Flanders" (featuring ASAP Ferg)	2018	—	—	—	RIAA: Gold	Sincerely, Tokyo
"Wam" (with A$AP Ferg)	2019	—	—	—		Floor Seats
"Money Up" (with Toro Y Moi)	2020	—	—	—		Never Forgotten
"BET Uncut" (featuring Chance the Rapper and Smino)	2020	—	—	—		Never Forgotten
"—" denotes a title that did not chart, or was not released in that territory.

=== As featured artist ===
Title	Year	Peak chart positions									Album
Title	Year	US	US R&B/HH	US Rap	US Main. R&B/HH	US Rhy.	US R&B/HH Air.	US Rap Air.	CAN	NZ Hot	Album
"Free Throw" (Gio Dee featuring Metro Boomin and MadeinTYO)	2015	—	—	—	—	—	—	—	—	—	Mind Yo Business EP
"Had To" (Royce Rizzy featuring MadeinTYO)	2016	—	—	—	—	—	—	—	—	—	Non-album singles
"Shake It Up" (G-Eazy featuring E-40, MadeinTYO, and 24hrs)	2017	—	—	—	—	—	—	—	—	—	Non-album singles
"Hot Shower" (Chance the Rapper featuring MadeinTYO and DaBaby)	2019	58	24	21	17	22	24	16	69	11	The Big Day
"Move Ya Hips" (ASAP Ferg featuring Nicki Minaj and MadeinTYO)	2020	19	8	6	36	26	40	—	73	6	Floor Seats II

== Other certified songs ==
List of other certified songs, showing year released and album name
Title	Year	Certification	Album
"Instinct" (Roy Woods featuring MadeinTYO)	2016	RIAA: Gold	Nocturnal
"Chucky Cheese"	2018	RIAA: Gold	Sincerely, Tokyo

== Guest appearances ==
List of non-single guest appearances, with other performing artists, showing year released and album name
Title	Year	Artist(s)	Album
"Bachelor"	2016	ASAP Mob, ASAP Rocky, Lil Yachty, Offset	Cozy Tapes Vol. 1: Friends
"LAMN"	2017	Left Brain	Mind Gone Volume 1
"JustLikeMyPiss"	2017	Ski Mask the Slump God	YouWillRegret
"Lil Favorite"	2017	Ty Dolla Sign	Beach House 3
"New Wave"	2017	Rich the Kid, Famous Dex	The Rich Forever Way
"Mine"	2017	Kyle	Non-album single
"One Night Savage"	2017	ASAP Ferg	Still Striving
"Match Hunters"	2018	Xavier Wulf	East Memphis Maniac
"Backwood"	2019	24hrs, Mynamephin	Valentino Twenty
