= Sincerely, Tokyo =

Studio album by MadeinTYO
- Released: October 26, 2018
- Recorded: 2017–2018
- Genre: Hip hop
- Length: 39:34
- Label: Private Club
- Producer: Arcade; Bizness Boi; DWN2EARTH; Fwdslxsh; Gravez; Hit-Boy; Ithinkwegotit; K Swisha; ModMaxx; Ricci Riera; Ronny J; TM88; Wallis Lane; Wheezy

MadeinTYO chronology
I Bet You Get This All the Time (2018)	Sincerely, Tokyo (2018)	Never Forgotten (2020)

Singles from Sincerely, Tokyo
- 1. "Ned Flanders" Released: June 1, 2018

Sincerely, Tokyo is the debut studio album by American rapper MadeinTYO. It was released on October 26, 2018 through Private Club Records, an independent record label by MadeinTYO and his brother, 24hrs. The album features guest appearances from 24hrs, Roy Woods, Gunna, ASAP Ferg, Blood Orange and Tinashe.

It was preceded by the release of the lead single, "Ned Flanders", with featuring vocals from ASAP Ferg. The single was released on June 1, 2018. The album debuted just inside the top 100 of the US Billboard 200, at number 98.

== Track listing ==
No.	Title	Writer(s)	Producer(s)	Length
1.	"On the Map"	Malcolm Davis; William Harris	DWN2EARTH	2:58
2.	"Retro 88"	Davis; Karl Hamnqvist	K Swisha	2:11
3.	"Chucky Cheese"	Davis; Hamnqvist	K Swisha	2:45
4.	"2 Flights"	Davis; Hamnqvist	K Swisha	2:17
5.	"Outstanding"	Davis; Ronald Spence, Jr.; Nima Jahanbin; Paimon Jahanbin	Ronny J; Wallis Lane	2:42
6.	"Lil Bih" (featuring 24hrs)	Davis; Robert Davis; Chauncey Hollis, Jr.	Hit-Boy	2:50
7.	"Moshi Moshi" (Interlude)	Davis; Hamnqvist	K Swisha	1:16
8.	"Whats Gwannin" (featuring Roy Woods)	Davis; Andre Robertson; Christopher Justice; Jonathan Mills; Yinka Bankole; Denzel Spencer; Kurtis McKenzie	Arcade; Bizness Boi; Fwdslxsh; Gravez	4:24
9.	"Figure It Out" (featuring Gunna)	Davis; Hamnqvist; Avery McRa; Sergio Kitchens	K Swisha; Ithinkwegotit	3:34
10.	"Ned Flanders" (featuring ASAP Ferg)	Davis; Hamnqvist; Darold Brown, Jr.	K Swisha	2:41
11.	"Jump"	Davis; Ricci Riera	Riera	2:51
12.	"Addicted to Power"	Davis; Hamngvist; Bryan Simmons; Wesley Glass	K Swisha; TM88; Wheezy	2:31
13.	"Margiela Problems" (featuring Blood Orange)	Davis; Harris; Devonte Hynes	DWN2EARTH	3:07
14.	"Savannah Sunset" (featuring Tinashe)	Davis; Maxwell Eberhardt; Tinashe Kachingwe	ModMaxx	3:38
Total length:				39:34

== Charts ==
Chart (2018)	Peak position
Canadian Albums (Billboard)	89
US Billboard 200	98
US Top R&B/Hip-Hop Albums (Billboard)	51

== Release history ==
Region	Date	Format(s)	Label	Ref.
Various	26 October 2018	digital download; streaming	Private Club Records	
Various	25 January 2019	Vinyl	Private Club Records	
