= 1017 Mafia: Incarcerated =

Mixtape by Gucci Mane
- Released: January 3, 2015
- Recorded: 2014–2015
- Genre: Hip hop
- Length: 46:42
- Labels: 1017 Records; 101 Distribution
- Producers: 808 Mafia; Drumma Boy; Nard & B; Tarentino; Southside; TM88; Zaytoven; Honorable C.N.O.T.E.; PURPS; Cassius Jay

Gucci Mane chronology
| East Atlanta Santa (2014) | 1017 Mafia: Incarcerated (2015) | Brick Factory 3 (2015) |

1017 Mafia: Incarcerated is a mixtape by American rapper Gucci Mane. The mixtape was released on January 3, 2015, by 1017 Records and 101 Distribution. The mixtape features guest appearances from Migos, Peewee Longway, Rich The Kid, Waka Flocka Flame, OG Maco, Young Scooter and Young Thug.

== Background ==
The cover art of 1017 Mafia is recycled, using an altered image from the artwork of Gucci Mane's 2010 studio album, The State vs. Radric Davis.

== Track listing ==
| No. | Title | Producer(s) | Length |
|---|---|---|---|
| 1. | "1017 Mafia" (featuring Young Thug) | Drumma Boy | 2:10 |
| 2. | "Lowest" (featuring Rich The Kid & OG Maco) | Tarentino | 3:39 |
| 3. | "Dead People" (featuring Raury) | Nard & B | 3:02 |
| 4. | "Close To Me" (featuring Waka Flocka Flame) | 808 Mafia | 4:12 |
| 5. | "Pick It Up" (featuring Waka Flocka Flame, Young Thug, Lil Duke & OG Boo Dirty) | Southside, TM88 | 4:26 |
| 6. | "Beef" (featuring Waka Flocka & Sy Ari da Kid) | 808 Mafia | 3:15 |
| 7. | "Drinking Lean Smoking Loud" (featuring Young Dolph & OG Boo Dirty) | Zaytoven | 3:28 |
| 8. | "Story" (featuring Young Dolph) | Honorable C.N.O.T.E. | 4:06 |
| 9. | "Ondalay" (featuring Migos & PeeWee Longway) | Zaytoven | 2:40 |
| 10. | "Ben Franklin" (featuring Young Scooter & Fein) | TM88 | 2:44 |
| 11. | "All Night Flight" (featuring Jose Guapo & Lil Duke) | PURPS | 3:17 |
| 12. | "Love" (featuring Lil Duke) | 808 Mafia | 3:59 |
| 13. | "Looks Like a Lick" (featuring MPA Wicced) | Cassius Jay | 3:03 |
| 14. | "Skirt" (featuring Quavo) | Zaytoven | 2:40 |
| Total length: | | | 46:42 |

== Charts ==
| Chart (2014) | Peak position |
|---|---|
| US Top R&B/Hip-Hop Albums (Billboard) | 47 |
| US Independent Albums (Billboard) | 40 |
