= Cabin Fever 3 (mixtape) =

Mixtape by Wiz Khalifa
- Released: December 15, 2015
- Recorded: 2014–15
- Genre: Hip hop
- Label: Rostrum; Taylor Gang
- Producer: Sonny Digital (exec.); DP Beats; Easy Mo Bee; Ricky P; TM88

Wiz Khalifa chronology
| Blacc Hollywood (2014) | Cabin Fever 3 (2015) | Khalifa (2016) |

Cabin Fever 3 is the thirteenth mixtape by American rapper Wiz Khalifa. It was released on December 15, 2015, by Rostrum Records and Taylor Gang Records. The tape marks as the third installment to his Cabin Fever trilogy. During an interview with HipHopDX, Wiz previewed a track, which was produced by Sonny Digital. The tape features guest appearances from Kevin Gates, Curren$y, 2 Chainz, K Camp, Project Pat, Yo Gotti, Problem and King Los, along with Taylor Gang members Juicy J and Chevy Woods.

== Track listing ==
| No. | Title | Producer(s) | Length |
|---|---|---|---|
| 1. | "Respect" (featuring Juicy J & K Camp) | TM88 | 5:18 |
| 2. | "Move On" (featuring Kevin Gates) | Sonny Digital | 3:14 |
| 3. | "Prequel" (featuring Curren$y) | Sonny Digital | 3:23 |
| 4. | "Freak Dips" (featuring Chevy Woods) | DP Beats | 3:32 |
| 5. | "Shit Starters" (featuring 2 Chainz) | TM88 | 3:14 |
| 6. | "No Worries" (featuring Chevy Woods) | Sonny Digital | 3:19 |
| 7. | "Finish Line" (featuring Project Pat) | Sonny Digital | 2:47 |
| 8. | "Call Again" (featuring Problem & Juicy J) | Easy Mo Bee | 5:50 |
| 9. | "Gangster 101" (featuring King Los) | Sonny Digital | 3:31 |
| 10. | "Left" (featuring Yo Gotti) | Sonny Digital | 3:06 |
| 11. | "Fucc Day" (Bonus track) | Ricky P | 3:59 |
