= Cash money =

Cash money may refer to:

- Cash, physical money

== Music ==
- "Cash Money" (song) by Tyga
- Cash Money Records, a New Orleans–based record label
  - Cash Money Millionaires, a term to describe rappers affiliated with Cash Money Records
- "Cash Money", a song by MC Solaar from the 2003 album Mach 6
- "Cashmoney", a 2019 song by No Rome
- DJ Cash Money, Philadelphia-based hip hop DJ
