= Call waiting (disambiguation) =

Call waiting is a telecommunication service.

Call waiting may also refer to:

- "Call Waiting" (Prison Break), a 2007 television episode
- "Call Waiting" (Roseanne), a 1996 television episode
- "Call Waiting", a song by Wiz Khalifa from Khalifa, 2016
- "Call Waiting" (The Night Agent), a 2026 television episode
