= All Night (Juicy J and Wiz Khalifa song) =

2016 single by Juicy J

Single by Juicy J and Wiz Khalifa

from the album TGOD Mafia: Rude Awakening
- Released: May 13, 2016
- Recorded: 2016
- Genre: Hip-hop; G-funk
- Length: 4:05
- Label: Atlantic; Columbia; EMPIRE
- Songwriters: Jordan Houston; Cameron Thomaz; Bryan Simmons; Abel Tesfaye; Martin McKinney; Carlo Montagnese
- Producer: TM88

Juicy J singles chronology
"Yamborghini High" (2016)	"All Night" (2016)	"No English" (2016)

Wiz Khalifa singles chronology
"Bake Sale" (2016)	"All Night" (2016)	"Pull Up" (2016)

"All Night" is a song by American rappers Juicy J and Wiz Khalifa. It was released on May 13, 2016 by Atlantic Records, Columbia Records, and Empire Distribution. It serves as the lead single from their mixtape, TGOD Mafia: Rude Awakening. It was produced by 808 Mafia member, TM88. The song samples "Lonely Star" by The Weeknd.

== Track listing ==
- Download digital
1. All Night — 4:05

== Release history ==
Region	Date	Format	Label	Ref.
Worldwide	May 13, 2016	Digital download	Atlantic Records, Columbia Records & EMPIRE	
