= Bake Sale (song) =

Single by Wiz Khalifa featuring Travis Scott

from the album Khalifa
- Released: January 21, 2016
- Recorded: 2015
- Genre: Trap
- Length: 3:58
- Label: Taylor Gang; Atlantic; Rostrum
- Songwriters: Cameron Thomaz; Jacques Webster II; Bryon Simmons; Jordan Houston; Lexus Lewis; Gary Hill; Mike Foster
- Producers: TM88; Juicy J; Lex Luger; DJ Spinz; Crazy Mike

Wiz Khalifa singles chronology
"King of Everything" (2015)	"Bake Sale" (2016)	"All Night" (2016)

Travis Scott singles chronology
"Whole Lotta Lovin'" (2016)	"Bake Sale" (2016)	"Wonderful" (2016)

"Bake Sale" is a song by American rapper Wiz Khalifa featuring fellow American rapper Travis Scott. It was released on January 21, 2016 as the lead single from the former's 2016 compilation album Khalifa. It was produced by TM88, Juicy J, Lex Luger, Crazy Mike, and DJ Spinz, based on one of the latter's produced songs, "Order More" by G-Eazy.

== Music video ==
The official music video was released on April 26, 2016.

== Charts ==
On the week of February 13, 2016, "Bake Sale" debuted at number 56 on the Billboard Hot 100, but left the next week. It reappeared on the chart at number 74 the week of February 27 before exiting the chart.

Chart (2016)	Peak position
Canada Hot 100 (Billboard)	71
France (SNEP)	70
US Billboard Hot 100	56
US Hot R&B/Hip-Hop Songs (Billboard)	18

== Certifications ==
Region	Certification	Certified units/sales
United States (RIAA)	Platinum	1,000,000^{‡}
^{‡} Sales+streaming figures based on certification alone.
