= The Blue M&M =

Mixtape by Peewee Longway
- Released: May 21, 2014
- Genre: Trap
- Length: 70:48
- Producer: Big K; Honorable C-Note; Breezey Muzik; Zaytoven; Cassius Jay; Mon5tar; Mucho; Metro Boomin; CashMoneyAP; Will-A-Fool; Krazy Blacc; K.E. On The Track; C4; Dun Deal

The Blue M&M is a mixtape by American rapper Peewee Longway. It was released on May 21, 2014. The mixtape is 21 tracks long, and contains guest appearances from Young Thug, Migos, Jose Guapo, and others.

== Composition ==
Matthew Trammell of The Fader described The Blue M&M as "a solid spread of rattling trap anthems". The mixtape contains guest appearances from Young Thug, Migos, Jose Guapo, among others. Writing for Stereogum, Tom Breihan said that the beats on the mixtape "sound like Casio keyboards trapped in echo chambers and trying to make Halloween sound-effects records." The Blue M&M consists of 21 tracks.

== Critical reception ==
Professional ratings
Review scores
Source	Rating
HipHopDX	3/5

In a HipHopDX review, Sheldon Pearce called the mixtape "a mixed bag, a hodgepodge of delightful spurts of magic and a handful of dreadful lulls and miscues."

== Track listing ==
The Blue M&M track listing
No.	Title	Producer(s)	Length
1.	"Everyday (Switcharoo)"	Big K	2:55
2.	"Cheetah Print"	Honorable C-Note	3:04
3.	"Blue Benjamin"	Breezey Muzik	3:32
4.	"That Boy Right There"	Zaytoven; Cassius Jay	3:40
5.	"How High"	Honorable C-Note	3:45
6.	"Pretty Penny" (featuring Offset)	Mon5tar	3:12
7.	"Cinco De Mayo" (featuring Hoodrich Pablo Juan)	Mucho	2:46
8.	"African Diamonds" (featuring Hoodrich Pablo Juan)	Mucho	3:35
9.	"Came In" (featuring Migos)	Mucho	4:06
10.	"Sneakin N Geekin"	Metro Boomin	3:20
11.	"Ola" (featuring Offset)	Zaytoven	4:28
12.	"FRFR" (featuring Quavo)	Mucho	3:38
13.	"OG Gas"		3:27
14.	"Juice" (featuring Young Thug)	CashMoneyAP	3:46
15.	"Took Chances" (featuring Jose Guapo)	Will-A-Fool	3:39
16.	"Documentary" (featuring Offset)	Krazy Blacc	3:18
17.	"Hotel" (featuring Woop)	K.E. On The Track	4:02
18.	"Energy Kit"	C4; Honorable C-Note	3:01
19.	"Situation" (featuring Offset)	Dun Deal	4:27
20.	"Switcharoo" (featuring Migos)	Zaytoven	2:04
Total length:			70:48

Bonus track
No.	Title	Producer(s)	Length
21.	"Servin Lean (Remix)" (featuring ASAP Rocky)	Honorable C-Note	4:55
