= Trap God =

Mixtape by Gucci Mane
- Released: October 17, 2012
- Recorded: 2012
- Genre: Hip-hop
- Labels: 1017 Brick Squad Records, Asylum/Warner Bros., Tommy Boy Entertainment
- Producers: Bankroll Clay, Tarentino, 808 Mafia, Drumma Boy, Mike WiLL Made It, T-Pain, Shawty Redd, Zaytoven, Metro Boomin, C4, Southside, KyeBeatz, Detail, CNote

Gucci Mane chronology
I'm Up (2012)	Trap God (2012)	Trap God 2 (2013)

Trap God is a mixtape by American rapper Gucci Mane, released on October 17, 2012. The mixtape was announced on July 31, 2012, with no release date notified. However, on August 8, Gucci announced that October 17, 2012, would be the date of the release. The mixtape features major guest appearances from Rick Ross, Waka Flocka Flame, Meek Mill, Future, T-Pain, Kevin McCall, Trae Tha Truth, Kirko Bangz, and Birdman, as well as up and coming rapper Young Scooter who is featured on 6 of the tracks.

== Background ==
On September 19, 2012, the first song was released in promotion of the mixtape titled "Fuck The World" featuring Future. On October 4, 2012, the music video was released for "Head Shots" featuring Rick Ross. On October 8, 2012, the music video was released for "Money Habits" featuring Young Scooter. On October 12, 2012, the music video was released for "Get Lost" featuring Birdman. On October 13, 2012, the music video was released for "Truth". On October 15, 2012, the music video was released for "Dead Man" featuring Young Scooter and Trae tha Truth. On October 17, 2012, the music video was released for "Fuck The World" featuring Future. On October 31, 2012, the music video was released for "Crazy" featuring Waka Flocka Flame. On November 7, 2012, the music video was released for "Gas and Mud". On February 20, 2013, the music video was released for "Shooter" featuring Young Scooter and Yung Fresh.

== Critical reception ==
Professional ratings
Review scores
Source	Rating
BET	4/5 stars
Pitchfork Media	7.2/10

Trap God was met with generally favorable reviews from music critics. Calvin Stovall of BET gave the mixtape four out of five stars, saying "Trap God doesn't necessarily cement Radric Davis’ legacy, but it certainly proves that he is capable of standing alongside his peers as an MC and a businessman." Miles Raymer of Pitchfork Media gave the mixtape a 7.2 out of ten, saying "Trap God has the lyrics and the punchline frequency (as well as the nasally congested, marble-mouthed flow), but it's short on the trademark Gucci vocal tics." Edwin Ortiz of HipHopDX said "“In retrospect, this is a similar formula utilized on his last mixtape I’m Up, which featured a Rap-stacked deck to masked Gucci Mane’s weaknesses."

== Track listing ==
No.	Title	Producer(s)	Length
1.	"Intro"	Lex Luger	2:00
2.	"Head Shots" (featuring Rick Ross)	Tarentino	3:50
3.	"Money Habits" (featuring Young Scooter)	Tarentino	2:42
4.	"Crazy" (featuring Waka Flocka Flame)	Drumma Boy	2:51
5.	"Get Money Nigga" (featuring Meek Mill)	Tarentino	3:55
6.	"Rolly Up" (featuring Waka Flocka Flame & Young Scooter)	Mike WiLL Made It	4:18
7.	"Fuck the World" (featuring Future)	Mike WiLL Made It	3:32
8.	"Act Up" (featuring T-Pain)	T-Pain	2:22
9.	"Never See" (featuring Verse Simmonds)	Shawty Redd	3:02
10.	"That's That" (featuring Kevin McCall)	Kevin "K-MAC" McCall	2:34
11.	"Servin"	Tarentino	2:36
12.	"Shooter" (featuring Young Scooter & Yung Fresh)	Zaytoven	3:36
13.	"Dead Man" (featuring Young Scooter & Trae Tha Truth)	Metro Boomin	3:47
14.	"Baby Wipes" (featuring Waka Flocka Flame)	Zaytoven	2:40
15.	"Don't Trust" (featuring Young Scooter)	Mike WiLL Made It	3:40
16.	"Suckaz"	Shawty Redd	3:01
17.	"Gas and Mud"	C4 Bombs, DJ Spinz	3:46
18.	"Fuck Something" (featuring Kirko Bangz, Waka Flocka Flame & Young Scooter)	Tarentino	3:45
19.	"I Fuck With That"	Mike WiLL Made It, Southside (co.), Da Honorable C.N.O.T.E. (add.)	3:32
20.	"Get Lost" (featuring Birdman)	Detail	4:38

iTunes Store bonus track
No.	Title	Producer(s)	Length
21.	"Truth"	Zaytoven	4:20

== Charts ==
Chart (2012)	Peak position
US Top R&B/Hip-Hop Albums (Billboard)	33
US Top Rap Albums (Billboard)	25
