= Burn Slow (Wiz Khalifa song) =

Single by Wiz Khalifa featuring Rae Sremmurd
- Released: September 3, 2015
- Recorded: 2015
- Genre: Hip hop
- Length: 3:42
- Label: Taylor Gang; Atlantic; Rostrum
- Songwriters: Cameron Thomaz; Khalif Brown; Michael Williams II; Marquell Middlebrooks
- Producers: Mike Will Made It; Marz

Wiz Khalifa singles chronology
"For Everybody" (2015)	"Burn Slow" (2015)	"King of Everything" (2015)

Swae Lee singles chronology
"Drinks On Us" (2015)	"Burn Slow" (2015)	"Unforgettable" (2017)

"Burn Slow" is a single by American rapper Wiz Khalifa. It was released on September 3, 2015. It was produced by Mike Will Made It and Marz. The song features a guest appearance from fellow American rapper Swae Lee of Rae Sremmurd, although the whole group is credited for commercial reasons.

== Commercial performance ==
"Burn Slow" debuted at number 83 on the Billboard Hot 100 chart for the week of September 26, 2015. Its debut was driven mostly by digital download sales, with 32,000 copies sold in its first week.

== Chart performance ==
Chart (2015)	Peak position
US Billboard Hot 100	83
US Hot R&B/Hip-Hop Songs (Billboard)	28
