= Brick Factory 3 =

Mixtape by Gucci Mane
- Released: February 12, 2015
- Recorded: 2014–2015
- Genre: Hip-hop
- Length: 51:08
- Label: 1017 Records, 101 Distribution
- Producer: Metro Boomin

Gucci Mane chronology
1017 Mafia: Incarcerated (2015)	Brick Factory 3 (2015)	Mr. Clean, The Middle Man (2015)

Brick Factory 3 is a mixtape by American rapper Gucci Mane. The album serves as the third installment in his popular Brick Factory series. The mixtape was released on February 12, 2015, by 1017 Records and 101 Distribution. The album features guest appearances from Peewee Longway, Young Thug and Lil B.

== Track listing ==
No.	Title	Producer(s)	Length
1.	"Down On That" (featuring Young Thug)	Cassius Jay	3:12
2.	"Heart Attack" (featuring Young Thug)	Zaytoven	4:20
3.	"Lost My Plug" (featuring PeeWee Longway)	Purps	3:26
4.	"Ain't Going Back" (featuring MPA Duke & Young Thug)	Nard & B	3:35
5.	"Back to Back" (featuring Bankroll Fresh)	Fresh Jones	4:33
6.	"Bombs" (featuring MPA Duke & PeeWee Longway)	Dun Deal	3:21
7.	"Stripper" (featuring Hoodrich Pablo Juan, MPA Duke & PeeWee Longway)	Dun Deal	4:39
8.	"Cookies" (featuring MPA Wicced, Young Thug & Lil B)	Nard & B	3:50
9.	"Do to Much" (featuring MPA Wicced, PeeWee Longway & Lil Duke)	Metro Boomin	4:41
10.	"My All" (featuring Young Thug & Lil B)	Nard & B	3:16
11.	"Kill My Opponent" (featuring MPA Wicced & PeeWee Longway)	Zaytoven	4:53
12.	"Shotas & Rostas" (featuring Young Thug, Khrome 1 & Young LA)	C4	4:21
13.	"Whoa" (featuring MPA Wicced)	Zaytoven	3:02
Total length:			51:08
