= Maria Skobeleva =

Filmmaker

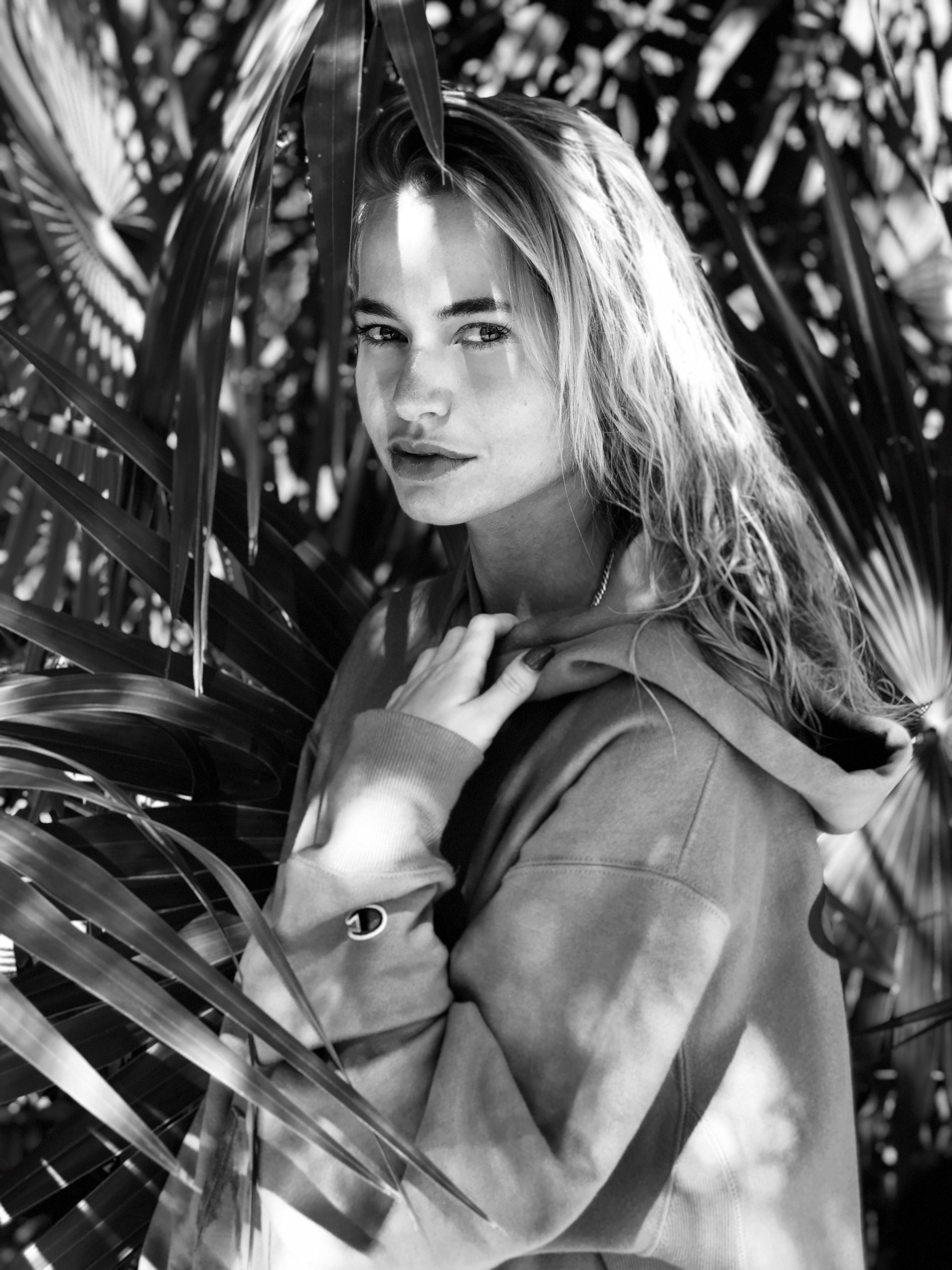
- Occupation: Filmmaker

Maria Skobeleva is a filmmaker.

== Filmmaking ==
Maria Skobeleva began her filmmaking career directing commercial films and music videos. She has since directed more than 200 music videos for Russian and American artists. Maria's commercial clients roster includes Forex, Land Rover, My Jet, and Shay Jewelry among others names.

One of Maria's first films was directing Russian singer Natalie's "Oh my God, what a man!" track released on February 6, and subsequently has collected more than 70 million views.

Maria began collaborating with hip hop artists from the Los Angeles area in 2016 and has received credit for Tyga's standalone single "Cash Money" in addition to his 2016 Rawwest Nigga Alive track "$ervin Dat Raww". In 2016 Maria continued her filmmaking career by directing Travis Scott's "Madeintyo - Uber Everywhere (Remix)" music video.

In 2017 Maria was credited with directing Quincy's - "I Can Tell You" feat. AL B Sure. In 2018 Maria directed Leah Kate's first music video "LA".

In 2019 she was selected to direct Farrah Fawx's single "Never Thought". In 2019 Maria was credited for directing both of Cierra Ramirez music videos "Broke Us" Ft. Trevor Jackson (2019) in addition to "Liquid Courage".

Maria has been credited as a second unit director for Anthology Film's 2019 Post Production of "9 Incredible Stories".

Maria is a member of Riveting Entertainment team, that cooperates with Last Kings Records, RCA Records and other record labels.

She is a member of SAG-AFTRA.
