= Peewee Longway =

American rapper

- Born: Quincy Lamont Williams; August 17, 1984 (age 41)
- Genres: Hip hop
- Occupation: Rapper
- Years active: 2012–present
- Labels: MPA BandCamp; 1017
- Website: 1017: Peewee Longway

Quincy Lamont Williams (born August 17, 1984), better known by his stage name Peewee Longway, is an American rapper from Atlanta, Georgia. He is best known for his mixtape The Blue M&M (2014) and his 2013 single, "Loaded" (with Young Thug). He was also a member of the rap group "Felix Brothers", alongside Gucci Mane and Young Dolph.

Williams was initially signed to Gucci Mane's record label, 1017 Records. After Gucci Mane went to prison in 2014, Williams founded his own label, MPA BandCamp.

== Legal issues ==
On August 31, 2022, Williams was arrested for illegal possession of a controlled substance and first degree possession of marijuana.

In September 2024, it was reported that Williams was arrested, along with 101 others, in a $280 million drug bust. His team did not make a statement on his arrest, and his name did not appear as those charged in federal indictment documents.

On April 1, 2026, Peewee Longway (Quincy Williams) pleaded guilty to conspiracy to distribute controlled substances and possession of a firearm by a convicted felon and received a 10 year sentence in July.

== Discography ==
=== Albums ===
==== Studio albums ====
List of studio albums, with selected album details.
Title	Details	Peak chart positions		
Title	Details	US	US HH/R&B	US Indie
Mr. Blue Benjamin	Released: January 29, 2016; Label: MPA BandCamp; Format: Digital download	—	39	35
Long Money (with Money Man)	Released: October 4, 2019; Label: Black Circle, MPA BandCamp, Empire; Format: Digital download, streaming	45	23	17

==== Mixtapes ====
List of mixtapes, with selected album details
Title	Album details
Money, Pounds, Ammunition (with Gucci Mane)	Released: March 22, 2013; Label: 1017 Records; Formats: Digital download
Running Around The Lobby(with Hoodrich Keem & DJ Scream)	Released: August 19, 2013; Label: MPA BandCamp; Formats: Digital download
Lobby Runners (with Various Artists)	Released: December 26, 2013; Label: MPA BandCamp, Quality Control, YSL, RFM, Hoodrich; Formats: Digital download
The Blue M&M	Released: May 21, 2014; Label: MPA BandCamp, 1017 Records, Gangsta Grillz; Formats: Digital download
World War 3D: The White Album (with Gucci Mane)	Released: June 16, 2014; Label: 1017 Records, 101 Distribution; Format: Digital download
Felix Brothers (with Gucci Mane & Young Dolph)	Released: July 17, 2014; Label: 1017 Records, 101 Distribution; Formats: Digital download
Blue M&M Vol 2 (King Size)	Released: February 23, 2015; Label: MPA BandCamp, 1017 Records, Gangsta Grillz; Formats: Digital download
BagMen (with Young Dolph)	Released: July 15, 2015; Label: Familiar Territory; Formats: Digital download
Money, Pounds, Ammunition Vol. 2	Released: August 17, 2015; Label: MPA BandCamp; Formats: Digital download
Money, Pounds, Ammunition Vol. 3	Released: June 10, 2016; Label: MPA BandCamp; Formats: Digital download
Longway Sinatra (with Cassius Jay)	Released: November 4, 2016; Label: MPA BandCamp; Formats: Stream
Blue M&M 3	Released: August 8, 2017; Label: MPA BandCamp; Formats: Digital download
Spaghetti Factory	Released: April 13, 2018; Label: MPA BandCamp; Format: Digital download
State of the Art	Released: November 30, 2018; Label: MPA BandCamp; Format: Digital download
LoLife Longway (with LoLife Blacc)	Released: June 11, 2019; Label: MPA BandCamp; Format: Digital download
Blue M&M 4	Released: August 23, 2019; Label: MPA BandCamp; Format: Digital download
Longway Sinatra 2 (with Cassius Jay)	Released: January 22, 2021; Label: MPA BandCamp; Formats: Stream
Longway Recipe	Released: February 14, 2022; Label: MPA BandCamp; Formats: Stream
Live a Lil	Released: December 16, 2022; Label: MPA BandCamp; Formats: Stream

=== Singles ===
==== As lead artist ====
List of singles as lead artist, showing year released and album name
Title	Year	Album
"Trenches" (featuring MPA Shitro and Young Dolph)	2013	Running Around the Lobby
"Servin' Lean" (featuring A$AP Rocky)	2014	Running Around the Lobby
"Know Bout Me" (featuring Young Thug and Offset)	2014	Mr. Blue Benjamin
"Do It for the Hood"	2015	Money, Pounds, Ammunition Vol. 2
"Jackie Tan" (featuring Wiz Khalifa and Juicy J)	2016	Mr. Blue Benjamin
"Nothin To Me" (with Hardo and Tay Keith featuring Doe Boy)	2020	Days Inn

==== Promotional singles ====
Title	Year	Album
"I Gotta Win" (with Jose Guapo and Cassius Jay)	2015	Non-album single

==== As featured artist ====
Title	Year	Album
"Time To Get Paid" (Gucci Mane featuring Peewee Longway)	2014	The White Album
"Frankie Lymon" (Low Pros featuring Peewee Longway, Que, Young Thug)	2014	EP1
"Jack Tripper" (Low Pros featuring Peewee Longway and Young Thug)	2014	EP1
"1500" (Beatmonster Marc & Wheezy featuring Rich Homie Quan, Peewee Longway and Lil Boosie)	2015	Non-album singles
"Him or Me" (Lil Tommy featuring Peewee Longway)	2015	Non-album singles
"Too Many Racks" (Joe Blow featuring Peewee Longway)	2015	Non-album singles
"Wat Chu Gone Do" (NBA YoungBoy featuring Peewee Longway)	2017	AI YoungBoy

=== Guest appearances ===
List of non-single guest appearances, with other performing artists, showing year released and album name
Title	Year	Other artist(s)	Album
"Nigeria"	2013	Young Thug, Gucci Mane	1017 Thug
"Dead Fo Real"	2013	Young Thug	1017 Thug
"Patna Dem"	2013	Young Thug	1017 Thug
"Tell 'Em That"	2013	Gucci Mane, Shawty Lo	Trap House III
"Off the Leash"	2013	Gucci Mane, Young Thug	Trap House III
"Ten Plus Ten"	2013	Migos, Jose Guapo	Streets On Lock
"Dirty Stick"	2013	Migos	Streets On Lock
"A To Z"	2013	Gucci Mane, Young Dolph	World War 3: Molly
"Geekin'"	2013	Gucci Mane, Waka Flocka	World War 3: Gas
"Fresh as a Bitch"	2013	Gucci Mane, Young Dolph	World War 3: Gas
"Christmas Tree"	2013	Gucci Mane, OJ da Juiceman	World War 3: Gas
"Super Head"	2013	Gucci Mane	World War 3: Gas
"Intro"	2013	Gucci Mane, Young Thug	World War 3: Lean
"Cinderella"	2013	Gucci Mane	World War 3: Lean
"I Quit"	2013	Gucci Mane, Young Dolph	World War 3: Lean
"#IJWHSF"	2013	Gucci Mane, Rich Homie Quan	Trust God Fuck 12
"Hol' Up"	2013	Gucci Mane, Rich Homie Quan	Trust God Fuck 12
"Rocky Balboa"	2013	Migos	Streets On Lock 2
"TrapAHolics"	2013	Rich The Kid, Migos	Streets On Lock 2
"Fugitive"	2013	Gucci Mane, Young Dolph	The State vs. Radric Davis II: The Caged Bird Sings
"Took By a Bitch"	2014	Gucci Mane, Young Thug	Young Thugga Mane La Flare
"Fucked Up the Kitchen"	2014	Migos	Streets On Lock 3
"Made It"	2014	Rich The Kid, Migos, Shy Glizzy, Zed Zilla	Streets On Lock 3
"Foreal"	2014	Migos	Streets On Lock 3
"Paper Problems"	2014	Gucci Mane, Young Thug	Brick Factory Vol. 1
"Serve On"	2014	Gucci Mane, Quavo	Brick Factory Vol. 1
"NWA"	2014	Gucci Mane, Migos, MPA Wicced, MPA Duke	Brick Factory Vol. 1
"I'ma Finesse"	2014	MPA Shitro, Young Thug	Son of a Bricc Lady
"12"	2014	Skippa da Flippa, Offset	—N/a
"Birdies"	2014	Gucci Mane	The Oddfather
"Sloppy Toppy"	2014	Travi$ Scott, Migos	Days Before Rodeo
"Hell U Talking Bout"	2014	Gucci Mane, Young Thug, Takeoff	Brick Factory Vol. 2
"Home Alone"	2014	Gucci Mane, Ca$h Out, Young Thug	Brick Factory Vol. 2
"Down & Out'"	2014	Gucci Mane, Keyshia Cole	Brick Factory Vol. 2
"Long Way'"	2014	Gucci Mane, Young Gleesh	Brick Factory Vol. 2
"Bad Habits"	2014	Gucci Mane, MPA Wicced	Brick Factory Vol. 2
"I Got"	2014	Young Thug	Rich Gang: Tha Tour Pt. 1
"Stop-Start"	2014	Mike Will Made It, Gucci Mane, Chief Keef	Ransom
"Why Would U Not"	2014	Rich The Kid, Johnny Cinco	Rich Than Famous
"Ondalay"	2015	Gucci Mane, Migos	1017 Mafia: Incarcerated
"Granny"	2015	2 Chainz, Bankroll Fresh	T.R.U. Jack City
"Lost My Plug"	2015	Gucci Mane	Brick Factory 3
"Bombs"	2015	Gucci Mane, MPA Duke	Brick Factory 3
"Do Too Much"	2015	Gucci Mane, MPA Duke, MPA Wicced	Brick Factory 3
"Kill My Opponent"	2015	Gucci Mane, MPA Wicced	Brick Factory 3
"Count A Check"	2015	Gucci Mane	Views from Zone 6
"Due2DaFact"	2015	Skippa Da Flippa, Migos	Migo Lingo
"No One Else"	2015	Gucci Mane, Young Thug	Trap House 5 (The Final Chapter)
"Real Dope Boy"	2015	Gucci Mane, Young Scooter	King Gucci
"Feelings"	2015	BP Da Realist	—N/a
"Most Wanted"	2015	MPA Duke, Offset	Lil Duke
"Quarterback"	2015	Young Thug, Quavo, Offset	Slime Season
"Addicted to Gangsta"	2015	Quavo, Hoodrich Pablo Juan	Streets On Lock 4
"No Problems"	2015	Gucci Mane, Rich Homie Quan	The Spot – Soundtrack
"Dope Love"	2015	Gucci Mane, Verse Simmonds	The Spot – Soundtrack
"I Deserve It"	2015	Gucci Mane	The Spot – Soundtrack
"Whiplash"	2022	Keith Ape	Ape Into Space
