= King of Everything =

Single by Wiz Khalifa
- Released: October 16, 2015
- Recorded: 2015
- Genre: Hip hop
- Length: 3:42
- Label: Taylor Gang; Atlantic; Rostrum
- Songwriter: Cameron Thomaz
- Producers: ID Labs; Cozmo

Wiz Khalifa singles chronology
"Burn Slow" (2015)	"King of Everything" (2015)	"Bake Sale" (2016)

"King of Everything" is a single by American rapper Wiz Khalifa. It was released on October 16, 2015. The song was produced by ID Labs and Cozmo.

== Commercial performance ==
"King of Everything" debuted at number 45 on the Billboard R&B/Hip-Hop Digital Songs chart, dated on November 7, 2015. and reached number 2 on the Bubbling Under R&B/Hip-Hop chart on November 21.

== Charts ==
Chart (2015)	Peak position
US Bubbling Under R&B/Hip-Hop Singles (Billboard)	2
