= The Big Day (album) =

2019 studio album by Chance the Rapper

Studio album by Chance the Rapper
- Released: July 26, 2019
- Recorded: 2019
- Genres: Hip-hop; pop rap; gospel rap; trap
- Length: 77:10
- Label: Self-released
- Producers: Chance the Rapper; Ben Lusher; Carter Lang; Charlie Handsome; Darius Scott; DeMartis 'Sax' Williams; Dex Coleman; Dwayne Verner Jr.; Eric Butler; Francis Starlite; Gabe Jaskowiak; Garren Langford; Greg Landfair; Jordan Ware; Justin Vernon; Lido; Murda Beatz; Nate Fox; Nico Segal; Peter Cottontale; Pi'erre Bourne; Smoko Ono; Timbaland; TrapMoneyBenny

Chance the Rapper chronology
Merry Christmas Lil' Mama Re-Wrapped (2016)	The Big Day (2019)	Star Line (2025)

Singles from The Big Day
- 1. "Do You Remember" Released: August 16, 2019; 2. "Hot Shower" Released: October 28, 2019

The Big Day is the debut studio album by American rapper Chance the Rapper, released on July 26, 2019. The album follows several mixtapes by the rapper, including the reissue of his collaborative Merry Christmas Lil' Mama in 2017, and was his first solo project since Coloring Book in 2016. The album was produced by Carter Lang, Francis Starlite of Francis and the Lights, Lido, and Chance's group The Social Experiment, who all previously helped produce Chance's Coloring Book, alongside Ben Lusher of Thirdstory, Charlie Handsome, Darius Scott (also known as Dixson), Justin Vernon of Bon Iver, Murda Beatz, Pi'erre Bourne, Timbaland, and more.

Numerous musical artists such as Francis and the Lights and Knox Fortune (both previously on Coloring Book), John Legend, Death Cab for Cutie, Smino, MadeinTYO, DaBaby, En Vogue, Ari Lennox, Kierra Sheard, Taylor Bennett (Chance's brother), CocoRosie, Megan Thee Stallion, Gucci Mane, Shawn Mendes, Randy Newman, Calboy, Lil Durk, Nicki Minaj, and SWV, made guest appearances on the project. John Witherspoon, Keith David, Cree Summer, DJ Casper, Lisa Mishra, and Jackée Harry also made uncredited appearances on the album, with Witherspoon's appearance being one of his last appearances in media before he died in 2019. The album was heavily influenced by Chance's marriage to his then-wife, Kirsten Corley.

The album was accompanied by two singles: "Do You Remember" (featuring Death Cab for Cutie) on the 16th of August, 2019, and "Hot Shower" (featuring MadeinTYO and DaBaby) on the 28th of October, 2019. The latter single would be the biggest song from the album, going viral on TikTok and charting at number 58 on the Billboard Hot 100 (Chance's second-highest entry on the chart as a lead artist), with "Do You Remember" charting at number 95 on the same chart (Death Cab for Cutie's most recent entry on the Billboard Hot 100 and their only feature). The album itself was released before the two singles, on July 26, 2019, after the title, cover, and release date of the album was teased on The Tonight Show Starring Jimmy Fallon.

The album debuted at number two on the US Billboard 200, Chance's highest-charting entry to date (although the album was blocked from hitting number one by NF’s album The Search). The album also charted in the top ten on charts in Australia, Canada, and New Zealand, alongside being nominated for Best R&B/Hip-Hop Album at the 2020 Libera Awards. While initial reviews from critics were positive, it received widespread negative attention from fans on social media and other Internet communities citing inconsistencies of quality throughout the work, and retrospective reviews from critics have been more negative. In November 2024, Rolling Stone ranked it at number 50 on its list of "The 50 Most Disappointing Albums of All Time". The album is usually credited with Chance's fall from mainstream popularity soon after.

== Background and production ==
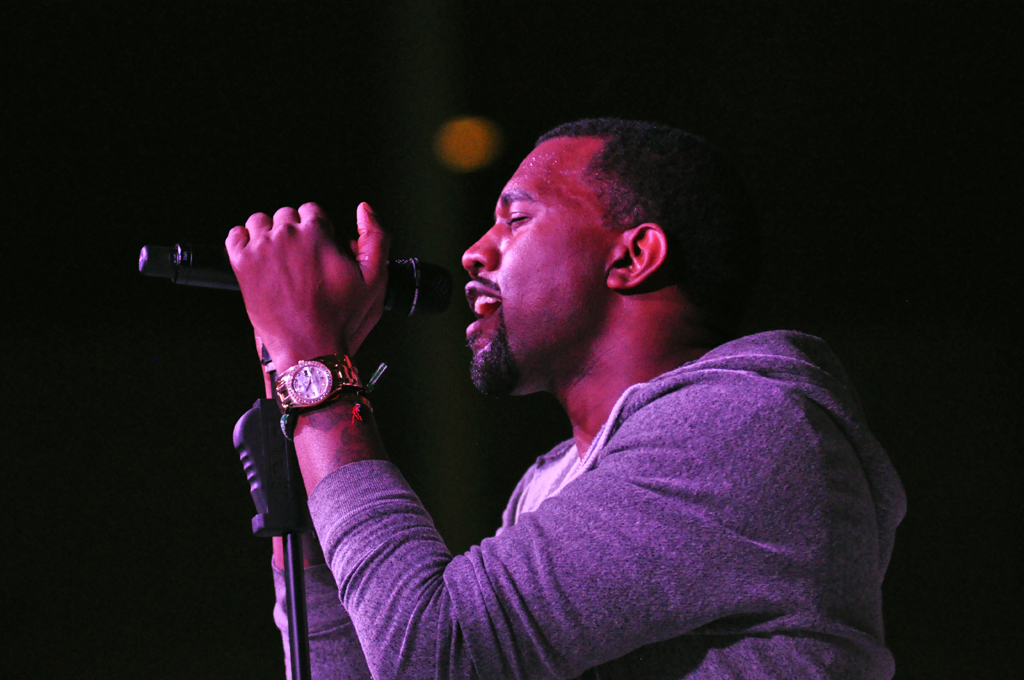
Kanye West (pictured) collaborated with Chance on the album Good Ass Job, although it was never released.

In a November 2016 interview, Chance the Rapper stated: "I think what I'm working on now is an album." In May and June 2018, American rapper and producer Kanye West released a set of 7-track albums as part of the Wyoming Sessions, producing five albums in collaboration with Pusha T, Kid Cudi, Nas, and Teyana Taylor. In July 2018, Chance announced that West was coming to Chicago to produce his debut album. West arrived in Chicago in mid-August 2018 and began recording. The duo later announced that their collaboration would be titled Good Ass Job. At the same time, West began working on his ninth studio album Yandhi and shifted his focus to that project instead; West has no production credits on the released version of The Big Day and Good Ass Job would stay unreleased, alongside Yandhi, which would become Jesus Is King. Chance's most recent collaboration with West to release was "Take Me to the Light", alongside Bon Iver and Francis and the Lights, who would later help produce The Big Day.

== Music and lyrics ==
The Big Day has been described by music journalists as a pop-rap and gospel rap record, similar to Chance's previous solo effort, Coloring Book. NOW Magazine's Richard Trapunski says it "presents a bigger and slicker version of [Chance the Rapper's] nostalgic gospel-rap sound", while Stephen Porzio from Hot Press mentioned how the album not only featured hip-hop, but also R&B and soul music.

Lyrically, the album follows Chance on his wedding day, inspired by his real-life marriage to Kirsten Corley in March 2019. Its predominant theme of family is explored with most songs about Kirsten and Chance's family and children. The album features contributions from his brother Taylor Bennett, who raps on "Roo", and his father Ken Bennett, who helped co-write "Eternal". This was not Chance's first time featuring members of his family, as his cousin, Nicole, previously featured on the Coloring Book track "How Great". In the skits "Photo Ops" and "4 Quarters in the Black", comedians John Witherspoon and Keith David play wise uncle characters to highlight the multigenerational aspect of weddings.

== Artwork and packaging ==
The artwork for the album cover features a jewel encrusted clear disc, reminiscent of a wedding ring, referencing the album's wedding theme, and was created by artist Sara Shakeel. Chance the Rapper reached out to Shakeel via Instagram to commission a physical object in her unique Swarovski crystal-clad style to be photographed and used for the cover art. Shakeel also created artworks for the rapper's installation "The Big Store". Inside the album booklet, Julio Blanco provided photographs of Chance and his family.

== Marketing and sales ==
In March 2017, Chance stated that he would sell his debut album, as opposed to the free release of his previous mixtapes. On February 12, 2019, Chance tweeted "July" and shared a video on his Instagram revealing that he had "been making music" that fans could expect to arrive the same month. On June 27, Chance released a promotional video titled "The Next Chapter Begins", where a pre-order for the album was launched. His first two mixtapes, 10 Day and Acid Rap, were also put up on music streaming services, and sold on vinyl alongside his third mixtape Coloring Book. On July 16, Chance the Rapper announced the album's title, release date and revealed its cover during his interview on The Tonight Show Starring Jimmy Fallon.

On August 4, 2019, The Big Day debuted at number two on the US Billboard 200 with 108,000 album-equivalent units, of which 27,000 were pure album sales in its first week. It was Chance's highest-charting entry and his third release to hit the top 10 of the chart. The song "All Day Song" ranked number 83 on the 2019 year-end list for the Tokio Hot 100.

== Critical reception ==
Professional ratings
Aggregate scores
Source	Rating
AnyDecentMusic?	6.8/10
Metacritic	71/100
Review scores
Source	Rating
AllMusic	4/5 stars
And It Don't Stop	A
Chicago Tribune	3/4 stars
Entertainment Weekly	A−
The Guardian	4/5 stars
Hot Press	7/10
The Independent	3/5 stars
NME	3/5 stars
Pitchfork	6.9/10
Rolling Stone	3/5 stars

The Big Day was met with generally positive reviews, according to the aggregate website Metacritic. At the website, which assigns a normalized rating out of 100 to reviews from professional critics, the album received an average score of 71, based on 21 reviews. Aggregator AnyDecentMusic? gave it 6.8 out of 10, based on their assessment of the critical consensus. The reception was described by journalists Shaad D'Souza (of The Fader) and Ben Yakas (of Gothamist) as "lukewarm".

Reviewing in July 2019, Al Horner of The Guardian described The Big Day as "a candid, cutesy concept album based around his wedding", believing it "combines something old and something new, subtly expanding Chance’s sound without ever straying too far from the sentimental gospel-pop heart of his last release, Coloring Book"." Fred Thomas of AllMusic wrote that "Bright, flawless production supports Chance's optimistic lyrics and cultivates an atmosphere overflowing with joy, wonder, and summery nostalgia". Christopher Weingarten of Entertainment Weekly concluded, "A master lyricist, a musical omnivore, Chance and his family of producers and instrumentalists channel all the big emotions of the big day in a swirl of bliss, marital and otherwise." In a less enthusiastic review, Danny Schwartz of Rolling Stone concluded that, "Despite its length, The Big Day is self-contained, at least by Chance’s standards", considering it "narrower in emotional scope" than the 2016 mixtape Coloring Book. Dhruva Balram of NME said it is "a buoyant, cheerful project that looks back on his young, successful career through rose-tinted lenses but, ultimately, doesn't possess enough depth amidst a mishmash of production and features that make it too long-winded".

The album and Chance received overwhelming criticism from fans on social media, spawning many Internet memes primarily about the album's focus on Chance's then-marriage. Having expected music similar to his previous mixtapes, many fans believed that the album was a regression for the rapper, finding his raps banal and his style childishly upbeat. The music critic Anthony Fantano rated it a zero on a scale of 10, calling the album a "22-track torture chamber with 77 minutes of runtime", finding the production and genre fusions on the album to "mostly sound like a mess" and saying that the record had many "offensive vocal performances". He also pointed out how bad the writing was on the album, saying that the songs on the record features some of Chance's "worst bars to date", and overall said that most of the faults on the album were due to Chance himself, saying "The most aggravating moments on this record, of which there are many, are the tracks that sound like 'Hey, this has a pretty good start, this could go somewhere, this has potential, this almost sounds good'. But then, at some point, Chance does something to just rip that away. Whether that be terrible singing, terrible bars, flat production, a bad guest." Writing for AllMusic in 2024, Fred Crone described it as "a certified horror-show of an album delivering two scary truths: 1. your favourite artist can, at any point, creatively combust. 2. your relationship probably isn't as interesting to everyone else as you think it is." The rapper responded on Twitter to the criticism, saying he believes that people wanted him to "kill himself".

The music critic Robert Christgau believed The Big Day had become a "backlash victim", instead ranking it on his year-end list as 2019's third best album. In his "Consumer Guide" column, he explained that, "Since the rhyming may seem slack when you follow every word, why bother? ... [T]he opener's choral 'we-back' intro and self-sufficient lyric lighten up the room every time they come round, and that mood never dulls." While applauding the guest performances, Christgau added that the best raps belong to Chance on "Found a Good One" and "Zanies and Fools". "Both celebrate his wedding day with a cred the cameos only flesh out, a cred that will endure as art even if the marriage itself fails—this is showbiz, after all. Best wishes to the happy couple and all their progeny."

== Track listing ==
Track listing and credits adapted from Apple Music and Tidal.

No.	Title	Writer(s)	Producer(s)	Length
1.	"All Day Long" (featuring John Legend)	Chancelor Bennett; John Stephens; Darius Scott; Dwayne Verner, Jr.; Greg Landfair; Nate Fox; Nico Segal; Peter Wilkins	Chance the Rapper; Scott; DeMartis "Sax" Williams; Verner; Eric "EB" Butler; Landfair; Fox; Segal; Peter Cottontale; TrapMoneyBenny	3:28
2.	"Do You Remember" (featuring Death Cab for Cutie)	C. Bennett; Benjamin Gibbard; Eric Butler; Francis Starlite; Garren Langford; Justin Vernon; Verner; Fox; Segal; Wilkins	Chance the Rapper; Scott; Starlite; Vernon; Fox; Cottontale	3:56
3.	"Eternal" (featuring Smino)	C. Bennett; Christopher Smith, Jr.; Darian Garcia; Scott; Langford; Landfair; Ken Bennett	Chance the Rapper; Scott; Langford; Landfair; Fox; Segal; Cottontale; Smoko Ono	4:03
4.	"Hot Shower" (featuring MadeinTYO and DaBaby)	C. Bennett; Malcolm Davis; Jonathan Kirk; Garcia	Chance the Rapper; Smoko Ono	3:45
5.	"We Go High"	C. Bennett; Ben Lusher; Scott; Mike Servin^{[a]}^{[b]}; Fox; Segal; Wilkins	Lusher; Chance the Rapper; Scott; Fox; Segal; Cottontale	4:59
6.	"I Got You (Always and Forever)" (featuring En Vogue, Ari Lennox and Kierra Sheard)	C. Bennett; Terry Ellis; Dawn Robinson; Cindy Herron; Maxine Jones; Courtney Salter; Kierra Sheard; Carter Lang; Verner; Butler; Langford; Fox; Wilkins	Lang; Chance the Rapper; Verner; EB; Langford; Fox; Segal; Cottontale; TrapMoneyBenny	4:41
7.	"Photo Ops (Skit)"	C. Bennett; Colleen Mares	Dex Coleman; EB	1:15
8.	"Roo" (featuring Taylor Bennett and CocoRosie)	C. Bennett; Taylor Bennett; Sierra Rose; Bianca Casady	Chance the Rapper; Verner; Landfair; Fox; Segal	2:51
9.	"The Big Day" (featuring Francis and the Lights)	C. Bennett; Scott; Starlite; Stephens; Lang; James Cleveland; Joe Rainey Sr.; Vernon; Segal; Wilkins	Lang; Chance the Rapper; Scott; Vernon; Segal; Cottontale	4:02
10.	"Let's Go on the Run" (featuring Knox Fortune)	C. Bennett; Kevin Rhomberg; Lusher; Lang; Scott; Verner; Fox; Segal	Lusher; Lang; Chance the Rapper; Verner; Rhomberg; Fox; Segal	3:41
11.	"Handsome" (featuring Megan Thee Stallion)	C. Bennett; Megan Pete; Dex Coleman; Pink Sweats^{[c]}; TrapMoneyBenny; Garcia; Wilkins	Chance the Rapper; Coleman; Cottontale; Smoko Ono; TrapMoneyBenny	2:53
12.	"Big Fish" (featuring Gucci Mane)	C. Bennett; Radric Davis; Timothy Mosley	Chance the Rapper; Timbaland; TrapMoneyBenny; Angel Lopez; Federico Vindver	3:06
13.	"Ballin Flossin" (featuring Shawn Mendes)	C. Bennett; Shawn Mendes; Scott; Landfair; Keith Edward Crouch^{[d]}; Kevin James; Fox; Wilkins; Scott Harris	Chance the Rapper; Scott; EB; Starlite; Landfair; Fox; Segal; Cottontale	2:49
14.	"4 Quarters in the Black (Skit)"	C. Bennett; Mares	Coleman; EB	2:13
15.	"5 Year Plan" (featuring Randy Newman)	C. Bennett; Randall Newman; Scott; Starlite; Gabe Jaskowiak; Jordan Ware; Macie Stewart; Fox; Wilkins	Chance the Rapper; Scott; Starlite; Jaskowiak; Ware; Fox; Cottontale	4:17
16.	"Get a Bag" (featuring Calboy)	C. Bennett; Calvin Woods; James Taylor^{[e]}; Peter Losnegard; Fox; Wilkins	Chance the Rapper; Landfair; Lido; Fox; Cottontale	3:21
17.	"Slide Around" (featuring Lil Durk and Nicki Minaj)	C. Bennett; Durk Banks; Onika Maraj; Jordan Jenks; Fox	Chance the Rapper; Pi'erre Bourne; Fox	4:30
18.	"Sun Come Down"	C. Bennett; Garcia; Scott; Verner; Butler; Jaskowiak; Fox; Segal; Wilkins; Ryan Vojtesak	Chance the Rapper; Charlie Handsome; Scott; Verner; EB; Jaskowiak; Fox; Segal; Cottontale; Smoko Ono	3:35
19.	"Found a Good One (Single No More)" (featuring SWV and Pretty Vee)	C. Bennett; Scott; Cheryl Gamble; Tamara Johnson; Leanne Lyons; Vena Excell; Shane Lindstrom; Verner; Landfair; Lisa Mishra; Fox; Segal; Wilkins	Chance the Rapper; Scott; Verner; EB; Landfair; Murda Beatz; Fox; Segal; Cottontale; TrapMoneyBenny	4:18
20.	"Town on the Hill"	C. Bennett; Starlite; Vernon; Wilkins	Chance the Rapper; Starlite; Vernon; Cottontale	2:59
21.	"Our House (Skit)"	C. Bennett; Mares	Coleman; EB	1:05
22.	"Zanies and Fools" (featuring Darius Scott and Nicki Minaj)	C. Bennett; Scott; Maraj; Lang; Verner; Landfair; Fox; Segal; Oscar Hammerstein II^{[f]}; Wilkins; Richard Rodgers^{[f]}	Lang; Chance the Rapper; Verner; Landfair; Fox; Segal; Cottontale	5:23
Total length:				77:10

Notes

- "Photo Ops (Skit)" features uncredited vocals by John Witherspoon
- "Ballin Flossin" features uncredited vocals by DJ Casper
- "4 Quarters in the Black (Skit)" features uncredited vocals by Keith David
- "Found a Good One (Single No More)" features uncredited vocals by Lisa Mishra
- "Our House (Skit)" features uncredited vocals by Cree Summer and Jackée Harry

Samples

- ^{^[a]} "We Go High" contains a voice sample of the character Navi, voiced by Kaori Mizuhashi, from The Legend of Zelda: Ocarina of Time.
- ^{^[b]} "We Go High" contains a sample from "Pop Lock'n Scripture", written and performed by Mike Servin.
- ^{^[c]} "Handsome" contains a sample from "Honesty", written by David Bowden, and performed by Pink Sweats.
- ^{^[d]} "Ballin Flossin" contains a sample from "I Wanna Be Down", written by Keith Edward Crouch, and performed by Brandy.
- ^{^[e]} "Get a Bag" contains a sample from "Only One", written and performed by James Taylor.
- ^{^[f]} "Zanies and Fools" contains a sample from "Impossible: It's Possible" from Cinderella, written by Oscar Hammerstein II and Richard Rodgers, and performed by Rodgers.

== Charts ==
=== Weekly charts ===
Chart (2019)	Peak position
Australian Albums (ARIA)	7
Belgian Albums (Ultratop Flanders)	45
Belgian Albums (Ultratop Wallonia)	181
Canadian Albums (Billboard)	3
Danish Albums (Hitlisten)	16
Dutch Albums (Album Top 100)	16
French Albums (SNEP)	160
Irish Albums (IRMA)	18
Lithuanian Albums (AGATA)	76
New Zealand Albums (RMNZ)	10
Norwegian Albums (VG-lista)	34
Swiss Albums (Schweizer Hitparade)	55
UK Albums (Official Charts)	17
US Billboard 200	2
US Top R&B/Hip-Hop Albums (Billboard)	2

=== Year-end charts ===
Chart (2019)	Position
US Billboard 200	159
US Top R&B/Hip-Hop Albums (Billboard)	60

== Release history ==
Region	Date	Format
Various	July 26, 2019	Digital download; streaming; CD
Various	2020	2x LP vinyl
