= You Are Forgiven =

Mixtape by MadeinTYO
- Released: April 27, 2016
- Recorded: 2015–16
- Genres: Hip-hop; trap
- Label: Privateclub
- Producers: K Swisha; ICYTWAT; Purps; Richie Souf

MadeinTYO chronology
You Are Forgiven (2016)	Thank You, Mr. Tokyo (2016)

Singles from You Are Forgiven
- 1. "Uber Everywhere" Released: February 26, 2016; 2. "I Want" Released: July 14, 2016

You Are Forgiven is the debut mixtape by American rapper MadeinTYO. It was originally released on April 27, 2016 by Privateclub Records on DatPiff, then it was re-released on August 19, 2016 on iTunes by Privateclub Records. You Are Forgiven features production from MadeinTYO himself, along with K Swisha, Richie Souf, Purps and ICYTWAT. It features guest appearances from 2 Chainz and Travis Scott. The mixtape was supported by the singles "Uber Everywhere", and "I Want".

== Singles ==
"Uber Everywhere" was released as the mixtape's lead single on February 26, 2016. It was produced by K Swisha.

"I Want" was released as the mixtape's second single on July 14, 2016. It features a guest appearance from 2 Chainz and was produced by Richie Souf.

== Track listing ==
iTunes version
No.	Title	Writer(s)	Producer(s)	Length
1.	"Savage"	Malcolm Davis; Karl Hamnqvist	K Swisha	2:12
2.	"Nawfside Shawty"	Davis; Hamnqvist	K Swisha	2:20
3.	"I Want" (featuring 2 Chainz)	Davis; Tony Son; Tauheed Epps	Richie Souf	3:54
4.	"Uber Everywhere" (featuring Travis Scott)	Davis; Hamnqvist; Jacques Webster	K Swisha	3:01
5.	"Kelly Rowland"	Davis; Hamnqvist; Nathaniel Caserta	K Swisha; Purps	2:53
6.	"Bool'n"	Davis; Hamnqvist	K Swisha	3:28
7.	"I Want"	Davis; Son	Richie Souf	2:11

DatPiff version
No.	Title	Writer(s)	Producer(s)	Length
1.	"Savage"	Malcolm Davis; Karl Hamnqvist	K Swisha	3:30
2.	"Nawfside Shawty"	Davis; Hamnqvist	K Swisha	2:40
3.	"Uber Everywhere"	Davis; Hamnqvist	K Swisha	2:33
4.	"Kelly Rowland"	Davis; Hamnqvist; Nathaniel Caserta	K Swisha; Purps	2:37
5.	"I Want (Skr Skr)"	Davis; Tony Son	Richie Souf	2:27
6.	"Takin' Off"	Davis; Hamnqvist	MadeinTYO; K Swisha	1:52
7.	"Morning"	Davis; Hamnqvist	K Swisha	2:08
8.	"Bool'n"	Davis; Hamnqvist	K Swisha	4:42
9.	"Jerry Stackhouse"	Davis; Hamnqvist	K Swisha	2:43
10.	"Whoeva"	Davis; Hamnqvist	K Swisha	2:24
11.	"Leftovers (Interlude)"	Davis; Hamnqvist	K Swisha	1:02
12.	"Need Dat Pack"	Davis; Brandon Banner	ICYTWAT	3:24
13.	"Lemon Peppers (Wet)"	Davis; Hamnqvist	K Swisha	2:15
14.	"Spanish Jaw (Outro)"	Davis	K Swisha	2:09

== Charts ==
Chart (2016)	Peak position
US Billboard 200	122
US Top R&B/Hip-Hop Albums (Billboard)	33
