= Rawwest Nigga Alive =

Mixtape by Tyga
- Released: January 15, 2016
- Recorded: 2015–16
- Genre: Hip hop
- Length: 53:37
- Label: Last Kings
- Producers: CrakWav; Jess Jackson (co.)

Tyga chronology
Fuk Wat They Talkin Bout (2015)	Rawwest Nigga Alive (2016)	BitchImTheShit2 (2017)

Singles from Rawwest Nigga Alive
- 1. "Dope'd Up" Released: October 30, 2015; 2. "Happy Birthday" Released: November 20, 2015; 3. "Baller Alert" Released: December 9, 2015

Rawwest Nigga Alive (edited version titled Rawwest Alive) is a mixtape by American rapper Tyga. It was released on January 16, 2016, by his independently owned record label Last Kings Records. The mixtape features guest appearances from Chris Brown, 2 Chainz, Rick Ross and Goapele. Preceding the mixtape's release were three singles: "Dope'd Up", "Happy Birthday", and "Baller Alert" featuring Rick Ross and 2 Chainz.

The project was later renamed Rawwest Alive and released on iTunes on January 16, 2016. On January 19, 2016, Tyga released the music video for "I $mile, I Cry". On March 22, 2016, Tyga released the music video for "$ervin Dat Raww" crediting Maria Skobeleva as director.

== Track listing ==
- All songs are produced by CrakWav, with the exception of "Rumorz", which was co-produced by Jess Jackson.

No.	Title	Length
1.	"10 Million $ Mortgage"	2:56
2.	"Dope'd Up"	3:34
3.	"$ervin Dat Raww"	2:52
4.	"Everybody Eat$" (featuring Goapele)	5:19
5.	"KnowUrSelf"	3:30
6.	"Juicy"	3:58
7.	"GCU$I"	4:18
8.	"Rumorz" (featuring Chris Brown)	3:24
9.	"Happy Birthday"	3:24
10.	"Interlude: Peanut Heads"	0:54
11.	"Baller Alert" (featuring 2 Chainz and Rick Ross)	3:59
12.	"$yrup"	3:24
13.	"Interlude: Missed Call"	0:49
14.	"The Feelin'"	3:39
15.	"4Life"	3:15
16.	"I $mile, I Cry"	4:15
Total length:		53:37

Notes

- "10 Million $ Mortgage" is not available on streaming services.

Sample credits

- "Rumorz" samples "Rumors" by Timex Social Club.
- "$ervin Dat Raww" samples "Think (About It) by Lyn Collins and "It's All About The Benjamins by Puff Daddy featuring Lil Kim, The LOX and Biggie Smalls.
- "Everybody Eat$" samples "Everybody Eats from Paid in Full.
