= Hot Shower (song) =

2019 Chance the Rapper song

Single by Chance the Rapper featuring MadeinTYO and DaBaby

from the album The Big Day
- Released: October 28, 2019
- Genre: Trap
- Length: 3:45
- Songwriter(s): Chancelor Bennett; Malcolm Davis; Jonathan Kirk; Darian Garcia
- Producer(s): Bennet; Smoko Ono

Chance the Rapper singles chronology
"Do You Remember" (2019)	"Hot Shower" (2019)	"Baby Mama" (2020)

MadeinTYO singles chronology
"Stop Calling" (2019)	"Hot Shower" (2019)	"Tokyo Nights" (2020)

DaBaby singles chronology
"100 P's" (2019)	"Hot Shower" (2019)	"No Time" (2019)

Music video
- "Hot Shower ft. MadeinTYO & DaBaby" on YouTube

"Hot Shower" is a song by American rapper Chance the Rapper featuring fellow American rappers MadeinTYO and DaBaby. It was released on October 28, 2019, as the second single from the former's debut studio album The Big Day. It was written by the artists alongside Smoke Ono, who produced it with Chance.

== Music video ==
The music video was released alongside the single on October 28, 2019. It was directed by Reel Goats, who have directed many of DaBaby's music videos. The visual plays out a reference to the film Good Burger in the song. Jake Johnson and Kel Mitchell make cameos in the video.

== Charts ==
Chart (2019)	Peak position
Australia (ARIA Hitseekers)	6
Canada (Canadian Hot 100)	69
New Zealand Hot Singles (RMNZ)	11
US Billboard Hot 100	58
US Hot R&B/Hip-Hop Songs (Billboard)	24
