= Pull Up (Wiz Khalifa song) =

Single by Wiz Khalifa featuring Lil Uzi Vert
- Released: May 24, 2016
- Recorded: 2016
- Genre: Trap
- Length: 3:27
- Label: Atlantic
- Songwriters: Cameron Thomaz; Symere Woods; Bryan Simmons; Mackenzie Stotts
- Producers: Ricky P; TM88

Wiz Khalifa singles chronology
"All Night" (2016)	"Pull Up" (2016)	"Kush Ups" (2016)

Lil Uzi Vert singles chronology
"You Was Right" (2016)	"Pull Up" (2016)	"Too Much Sauce" (2016)

"Pull Up" is a song by American rapper Wiz Khalifa featuring fellow American rapper Lil Uzi Vert. Written alongside producers Ricky P and TM88, it was released for digital download on May 24, 2016 by Atlantic Records as a standalone single. The music video was released on July 14, 2016.

== Track listing ==
- Download digital
1. Pull Up (featuring Lil Uzi Vert) — 3:27

== Charts ==
Chart (2016)	Peak position
US Bubbling Under Hot 100 (Billboard)	20
US Hot R&B/Hip-Hop Songs (Billboard)	49

== Certifications ==
Region	Certification	Certified units/sales
United States (RIAA)	Gold	500,000^{‡}
^{‡} Sales+streaming figures based on certification alone.

== Release history ==
Location	Date	Format	Label	Ref.
Various	May 24, 2016	Digital download	Atlantic	
