= Trap House 5 =

Trap House 5 (The Final Chapter)

Mixtape by Gucci Mane
- Released: May 1, 2015
- Recorded: 2014–2015
- Genre: Hip hop; trap
- Length: 49:33
- Label: 1017; RBC
- Producer: Cassius Jay; Honorable C.N.O.T.E.; Mike WiLL Made-It; Zaytoven

Gucci Mane chronology
Breakfast, Lunch, Dinner (2015)	Trap House 5 (The Final Chapter) (2015)	King Gucci (2015)

Trap House 5 is a commercial mixtape by American rapper Gucci Mane. The album serves as the fifth and final installment in his popular Trap House series. It was released on May 1, 2015 by 1017 Records and RBC Records. The mixtape features guest appearances from Chief Keef, Peewee Longway, Young Thug and Jose Guapo.

== Track listing ==
No.	Title	Producer(s)	Length
1.	"Intro"	Mike WiLL Made-It	1:38
2.	"Cold Day"	Zaytoven	3:15
3.	"Fat Plugs"	Zaytoven	4:02
4.	"Gamble"	Zaytoven	4:07
5.	"No One Else" (featuring Young Thug, Peewee Longway & Jose Guapo)	Cassius Jay	5:05
6.	"Money Stacks"	Zaytoven	2:58
7.	"On The Reg"	Zaytoven	4:38
8.	"Draggin'"	Zaytoven	3:06
9.	"Go Go Gadget"	Zaytoven	3:31
10.	"What Is You Sayin"	Zaytoven	3:26
11.	"I Used To Know"	Zaytoven	3:19
12.	"Ring"	Zaytoven	3:13
13.	"Constantly" (featuring Chief Keef)	Honorable C.N.O.T.E.	3:48
14.	"Too Long"	Zaytoven	3:34
Total length:			49:33
