= Trap God 2 =

Mixtape by Gucci Mane
- Released: February 12, 2013
- Recorded: 2012
- Genre: Hip-hop
- Label: 1017 Brick Squad Records, Asylum/Warner Bros., Tommy Boy Entertainment
- Producer: Zaytoven, Lex Luger, DJ Spinz, C4, DJ Squeeky, Honorable C.N.O.T.E., 808 Mafia, Mike WiLL Made It, Purps, Drumma Boy, TM88, FKi

Gucci Mane chronology
Trap God (2012)	Trap God 2 (2013)	Free Bricks 2 (2013)

Trap God 2 is a mixtape by American rapper Gucci Mane, released on February 12, 2013. The mixtape features guest appearances from Young Scooter, Wiz Khalifa, Lil Wayne, Young Thug, Big Bank Black, OG Boo Dirty, Waka Flocka Flame, PeeWee Longway, Young Dolph, Rulet 1017, Verse Simmonds, Rocko and Lloyd.

== Background ==
On December 27, 2012, the first song was released in promotion of the mixtape titled "Nothin' On Ya" featuring Wiz Khalifa. On January 4, the second song was released in promotion of the mixtape titled "Squad Car" featuring Big Bank Black and OG Boo Dirty. On January 19, 2013, during an interview with XXL Gucci Mane announced he would be releasing a sequel to his popular mixtape "Trap God", saying "I’m in the studio. Working on my mixtape, Trap God 2 I’m dropping that on Spring Break. I’ve got a movie coming out Spring Breakers, so I’m dropping Trap God 2: Spring Break Edition to coincide with the movie." On February 3, 2013, it was announced the mixtape would be released on February 12, 2013. On February 5, the third song was released in promotion of the mixtape titled "Handicap" featuring Big Bank Black. On February 11, 2013, the fourth song was released in promotion of the mixtape titled "Breakfast" featuring PeeWee Longway and Waka Flocka Flame A music video for the song "Servin'" was released on February 6, 2013. It has since had over 2 million views on YouTube. On February 11, 2013, the music video was released for "Squad Car" featuring Big Bank Black and OG Boo Dirty. On March 28, 2013, the music video was released for "Nothin' On Ya" featuring Wiz Khalifa. The music video for "Break Dancin'" featuring Young Thug was released on May 17, 2013.

== Commercial performance ==
The mixtape sold 2,900 copies in the United States during its first week, which was not enough to chart.

== Track listing ==
No.	Title	Producer(s)	Length
1.	"DJ Scream Intro"		0:24
2.	"Big Guwap" (featuring Young Scooter)	Zaytoven	2:31
3.	"When I Was Water Wippin'"	Lex Luger	3:24
4.	"Nothin' On Ya" (featuring Wiz Khalifa)	DJ Spinz, C4	3:53
5.	"Servin'"	C4	4:06
6.	"Bullet Wound" (featuring Lil Wayne and Young Scooter)	DJ Squeeky	3:28
7.	"Bob Marley"	Honorable C.N.O.T.E.	2:52
8.	"Pistol In The Party"	DJ Spinz, C4	2:48
9.	"Miracle" (featuring Young Thug)	Lex Luger	4:24
10.	"Squad Car" (featuring Big Bank Black and OG Boo Dirty)	TM88	4:08
11.	"Rich Muthafucka"	Mike WiLL Made It	2:52
12.	"Breakfast" (featuring Waka Flocka Flame and PeeWee Longway)	Purps	5:11
13.	"Greasy"	Zaytoven	2:59
14.	"Can't Interfere Wit My Money" (featuring OG Boo Dirty)	Drumma Boy	4:05
15.	"Scholar"	Lex Luger	3:30
16.	"Really Ready" (featuring Young Dolph and Rulet 1017)	Bankroll Clay	4:20
17.	"You Gon Love Me" (featuring Verse Simmonds)	Zaytoven	2:45
18.	"God's Witness"	Zaytoven	3:54
19.	"Runnin' Circles" (featuring Lil Wayne)	Zaytoven	4:00
20.	"Break Dancin'" (featuring Young Thug)	Bankroll Clay	2:58
21.	"Get The Doe" (featuring Rocko)	Bankroll Clay	3:25
22.	"Fly Shit" (featuring Lloyd)	FKi	3:46
23.	"Supposed 2"	Zaytoven, Honorable C.N.O.T.E.	3:28

== Charts ==
Chart (2013)	Peak position
US Top R&B/Hip-Hop Albums (Billboard)	34
US Top Rap Albums (Billboard)	20
US Independent Albums (Billboard)	29
