= TGOD Mafia: Rude Awakening =

Studio album by TGOD Mafia
- Released: June 3, 2016
- Recorded: 2015–2016
- Genre: Hip-hop
- Length: 62:35
- Labels: Taylor Gang; Empire; Columbia; Atlantic
- Producers: TM88 (also exec.); Cubeatz

Juicy J chronology
Stay Trippy (2013)	TGOD Mafia: Rude Awakening (2016)	Rubba Band Business (2017)

Wiz Khalifa chronology
Khalifa (2016)	TGOD Mafia: Rude Awakening (2016)	Laugh Now, Fly Later (2017)

TM88 chronology
88 World (2016)	TGOD Mafia: Rude Awakening (2016)

Singles from TGOD Mafia: Rude Awakening
- 1. "All Night" Released: May 13, 2016

Rude Awakening is the debut studio album by American hip hop supergroup TGOD Mafia, which consists of rappers Juicy J, Wiz Khalifa and record producer TM88. It was released on June 3, 2016, by Taylor Gang Entertainment, Atlantic Records, Columbia Records and Empire Distribution. The lone guest appearance is provided by fellow American rapper Project Pat. The album was supported by the single, "All Night".

== Release and promotion ==
On March 21, 2016, record producer TM88 revealed that he along with rappers Juicy J and Wiz Khalifa, were releasing a collaboration album. He also posted a picture of the album's track list on Instagram. Juicy J and Wiz Khalifa were listed at the top of the picture, and beneath their names was the title that said, "Prod. by TM88", which suggested that TM88 had done the production on all of the songs. On May 7, 2016, Wiz hinted at the album title in a tweet and said that the project would be released the following week.

On May 13, a pre-order for the album was made available on iTunes which revealed an updated track list. Initially a collaboration with One Direction's Liam Payne was slated to be included on the album, however, it was removed when it was done on an unfinished demo of the song that was leaked online in April 2016. On May 13, their first official single from the album, titled "All Night" was released on iTunes.

== Commercial performance ==
Rude Awakening debuted at number 26 on the US Billboard 200, with 15,000 album-equivalent units; it sold 10,000 copies in its first week, and boasted over 4.1 million streams. The album debuted in the top ten of the Billboard's Top R&B/Hip-Hop Albums, Independent Albums and Digital Albums charts, reaching the numbers 3, 5 and 9 respectively.

== Track listing ==
Writing credits adapted from BMI and ASCAP.

No.	Title	Writer(s)	Producer(s)	Length
1.	"TGOD Mafia Intro"	Jordan Houston; Cameron Thomaz		0:54
2.	"Da Power"	Houston; Thomaz; Bryan Simmons; Jerami Davis	TM88	4:21
3.	"Medication"	Houston; Thomaz; Simmons; Davis; Gilbere Forte; Victory Belz	TM88; Southside	4:06
4.	"Where Was You"	Houston; Thomaz; Simmons; Davis; Curtis Washington	TM88; YEEZY808	4:12
5.	"All Night"	Houston; Thomaz; Simmons; Davis; Philip Green; Abel Tesfaye; Martin McKinney; Carlo Montagnese	TM88	4:05
6.	"I See It I Want It"	Houston; Thomaz; Simmons; Davis; Tauren Strickland; Kevin Gomringer; Tim Gomringer	TM88; Cubeatz; YEEZY808	4:33
7.	"Hit Me Up"	Houston; Thomaz; Simmons	TM88; YEEZY808	4:10
8.	"Green Suicide"	Houston; Thomaz; Simmons; Davis; Washington; Green	Juicy J; TM88	4:26
9.	"Bossed Up"	Houston; Thomaz; Simmons; Davis; Strickland; K. Gomringer; T. Gomringer	TM88; Southside; Cubeatz	4:40
10.	"She In Love"	Houston; Thomaz; Simmons; Davis; Strickland; K. Gomringer; T. Gomringer	TM88; Cubeatz; MP808	4:01
11.	"Breaking News" (featuring Project Pat)	Houston; Thomaz; Simmons; Davis; Patrick Houston	TM88; Big Jerm; MP808	4:21
12.	"Itself"	Houston; Thomaz; Simmons; Davis	TM88	4:12
13.	"Luxury Flow"	Houston; Thomaz; Simmons; Davis; Forte; Belz	Juicy J; TM88; Crazy Mike	4:10
14.	"Stay the Same"	Houston; Thomaz; Simmons; Davis; K. Gomringer; T. Gomringer	Juicy J; TM88; Cubeatz	2:35
15.	"On the Way"	Houston; Thomaz; Simmons; Davis; Green	TM88; YEEZY808	4:25
16.	"Cell Ready"	Houston; Thomaz; Simmons; Strickland; K. Gomringer; T. Gomringer	TM88; Cubeatz	3:24
Total length:				62:35

Sample credits

- "All Night" contains a sample from "Lonely Star" performed by The Weeknd.
- "Stay the Same" contains a sample from the original composition "Vibez" from Frank Dukes and Chester Hansen.
- "Luxury Flow" contains a samples from "Halloween Theme - Main Title" performed by John Carpenter.

== Charts ==
Chart (2016)	Peak position
Canadian Albums (Billboard)	81
US Billboard 200	26
US Independent Albums (Billboard)	5
US Top R&B/Hip-Hop Albums (Billboard)	3
