= Khalifa (album) =

Compilation album by Wiz Khalifa
- Released: February 5, 2016
- Recorded: 2013–2015
- Genre: Hip hop
- Length: 51:28
- Label: Rostrum; Atlantic
- Producer: I.D. Labs; Crazy Mike; DJ Spinz; Finatik N Zac; Jim Jonsin; Juicy J; Knucklehead; Lex Luger; Ricky P; Ritz Reynolds; Sap; Sayez; Shod Beatz; Sledgren; TM88

Wiz Khalifa chronology
Cabin Fever 3 (2015)	Khalifa (2016)	TGOD Mafia: Rude Awakening (2016)

Singles from Khalifa
- 1. "Bake Sale" Released: January 21, 2016

Khalifa is a compilation album by American rapper Wiz Khalifa. It was released on February 5, 2016, by Atlantic Records and Rostrum Records, serving as his fourth release with Atlantic. The project features guest appearances from Courtney Noelle, Travis Scott, J.R. Donato, Chevy Woods, Juicy J, Ty Dolla Sign, Rico Love and Wiz's son Sebastian. The production on the project was provided by Wiz's frequent collaborators such as I.D. Labs and Sledgren, alongside the additional production by Lex Luger, DJ Spinz, Jim Jonsin, Juicy J, among others.

The project was supported by the release lead and only single, "Bake Sale" featuring American rapper and singer Travis Scott. The project was preceded the release by the accompanied music videos for tracks such as "Zoney", "Elevated", "Celebrate" and "Most of Us".

== Background ==
On January 10, 2016, Wiz Khalifa announced the title to his new project: Khalifa. Khalifa also explained that the project would largely consist of older unreleased songs that were recorded for his previous albums. No physical copies of the project were made.

== Singles ==
The project's lead single, "Bake Sale", was released for purchase and streaming on January 21, 2016. The song features a guest appearance from American rapper Travis Scott, while the production was provided by TM88, Juicy J, Lex Luger, DJ Spinz and Crazy Mike. In December 2015, Wiz Khalifa previewed that track and then announced that the song would be included on his new project, Khalifa. This familiar instrumental for the song was once appeared on the other song "Order More" by G-Eazy, which was included on his album When It's Dark Out (2015). Due to ownership issues, Juicy J re-created the beat on the song for Wiz Khalifa, along with these co-producers. On the chart dated on February 13, 2016, it debuted and peaked at number 56 on the US Billboard Hot 100.

== Critical reception ==
Professional ratings
Aggregate scores
Source	Rating
Metacritic	56/100
Review scores
Source	Rating
AllMusic	3/5 stars
Billboard	3/5 stars
HipHopDX	6.6/10
Pitchfork Media	5.1/10
Rolling Stone	2.5/5 stars
Spin	4/10
XXL	3/5 (L)

Upon its release, Khalifa was met with generally mixed reviews from music critics. At Metacritic, which assigns a normalized rating out of 100 to reviews from critics, the album received an average score of 56, which indicates "mixed or average reviews", based on 7 reviews. Chris Gibbons of Exclaim! said, "Khalifa likely won't sway opinion of Wiz Khalifa, whether positive or negative. For better or worse, it's a portrait of the rapper we've seen for years. It does do things a little more consistently and adds a little more detail than what we're used to seeing." Kris Ex of Billboard said, "On Khalifa, he's characteristically mellow and melodic, mixing rhymes that are part equal parts braggadocio and motivational slogans in an almost singular pursuit of highs and riches. By design, none of the songs stand out, save for the Travis Scott featuring 'Bake Sale', which wins mostly by sounding like an aired-out version of Scott's own hit 'Antidote'." David Jeffries of AllMusic questioned the exclusion of "See You Again" and said, "These expansive cuts surely benefit the Wiz discography, and will do best when shuffled into his canon, but lump them together into one LP and take away the driving influence and Khalifa feels more like part of a continuum than a self-contained statement."

== Commercial performance ==
Khalifa debuted at number six on the US Billboard 200, with 64,000 album-equivalent units; it sold 45,000 copies in its first week, boasting over 19.8 million streams. Khalifa became Khalifa's fourth consecutive top-ten debut on the Billboard 200.

== Track listing ==
No.	Title	Writer(s)	Producer(s)	Length
1.	"BTS"	Cameron Thomaz; Edward Murray	Sledgren	4:03
2.	"Celebrate" (featuring Rico Love)	Thomaz; Richard Butler, Jr.; Isaac de Boni; Michael Mule; James Scheffer	Jim Jonsin; Finatik N Zac	3:09
3.	"Elevated"	Thomaz; Jeremy Kulousek; Eric Dan; Zach Vaughan	I.D. Labs; Sayez	4:10
4.	"City View" (featuring Courtney Noelle)	Thomaz; Courtney Noelle; Jonathan King	Sap	3:13
5.	"Cowboy"	Thomaz; de Boni; Mule; Scheffer	Jim Jonsin; Finatik N Zac	2:54
6.	"Bake Sale" (featuring Travis Scott)	Thomaz; Jacques Webster II; Bryon Simmons; Jordan Houston; Lexus Lewis; Gary Hill; Michael Foster	TM88; Juicy J; Lex Luger; DJ Spinz; Crazy Mike	3:58
7.	"Call Waiting"	Thomaz; Brent Reynolds	Ritz Reynolds	4:00
8.	"Make a Play" (featuring J.R. Donato)	Thomaz; Demetrius Gordon; Kulousek; Dan; Rashod Odom	I.D. Labs; Shod Beatz; Mumbles	3:46
9.	"Most of Us"	Thomaz; Kulousek; Dan	I.D. Labs	4:12
10.	"Zoney" (featuring Sebastian)	Thomaz; Samuel Irving III	Knucklehead	3:32
11.	"Lit" (featuring Ty Dolla Sign)	Thomaz; Tyrone Griffin, Jr.; Kulousek; Dan	Jay Card; Dru Tang; I.D. Labs; Ricky P	6:21
12.	"No Permission" (featuring Chevy Woods)	Thomaz; Kevin Woods; Kulousek; Dan; Odom	I.D. Labs; Shod Beatz	3:56
13.	"iSay" (featuring Juicy J)	Thomaz; Houston; Kulousek; Dan	I.D. Labs	4:14
Total length:				51:28

== Charts ==
=== Weekly charts ===
Chart (2016)	Peak position
Australian Albums (ARIA)	48
Austrian Albums (Ö3 Austria)	47
Belgian Albums (Ultratop Flanders)	82
Belgian Albums (Ultratop Wallonia)	100
Canadian Albums (Billboard)	11
Dutch Albums (Album Top 100)	73
French Albums (SNEP)	99
German Albums (Offizielle Top 100)	4
Swiss Albums (Schweizer Hitparade)	43
UK Albums (OCC)	85
UK R&B Albums (OCC)	10
US Billboard 200	6
US Top R&B/Hip-Hop Albums (Billboard)	3

=== Year-end charts ===
Chart (2016)	Position
US Top R&B/Hip-Hop Albums (Billboard)	49

== Release history ==
Region	Date	Format(s)	Label
United States	February 5, 2016	Digital download	Atlantic; Rostrum
