= Uber Everywhere =

Single by MadeinTYO

from the album You Are Forgiven
- Released: February 26, 2016
- Recorded: 2015
- Genre: Hip hop; trap
- Length: 2:33
- Label: Privateclub; Warner Bros.
- Songwriters: Malcolm Davis; Karl Hamnqvist
- Producer: K Swisha

MadeinTYO singles chronology
"Uber Everywhere" (2016)	"I Want" (2016)

Music video
- "Uber Everywhere" on YouTube

"Uber Everywhere" is the debut single by American rapper MadeinTYO, released on February 26, 2016 by Privateclub Records. Produced by K Swisha, the song is about the extensive use of Uber. "Uber Everywhere" peaked at number 51 on the Billboard Hot 100. The single was certified double platinum by the Recording Industry Association of America (RIAA).

== Music video ==
The song's accompanying music video premiered on August 21, 2015 on Privateclub Records YouTube channel. Since its release, the music video has received over 59 million views on YouTube. Credit for directing was given to Maria Skobeleva.

== Remixes ==
On July 12, 2016 an official remix was released accompanying a music video featuring American rapper and record producer Travis Scott, this remix was the version included on MadeinTYO's mixtape You Are Forgiven. Tory Lanez released his own modified remix of the song. Trey Songz released a remix entitled "Lyft Everywhere". Also remixed by American rapper Trill Sammy. British rapper Black The Ripper released a pro-cannabis version of the song entitled "Light Up Everywhere".

== Commercial performance ==
"Uber Everywhere" debuted at number 99 on Billboard Hot 100 for the chart dated April 16, 2016. The song peaked at number 51 on the Billboard Hot 100.

== Charts ==
=== Weekly charts ===
Chart (2016)	Peak position
US Billboard Hot 100	51
US Hot R&B/Hip-Hop Songs (Billboard)	16
US Hot Rap Songs (Billboard)	11

=== Year-end charts ===
Chart (2016)	Position
US Hot R&B/Hip-Hop Songs (Billboard)	44

== Certifications ==
Region	Certification	Certified units/sales
United States (RIAA)	2× Platinum	2,000,000^{‡}
^{‡} Sales+streaming figures based on certification alone.
