= Trap House III =

Mixtape by Gucci Mane
- Released: May 21, 2013
- Recorded: 2012–2013
- Genres: Hip hop; trap
- Length: 67:04
- Labels: 1017 Brick Squad; 101 Distribution
- Producers: Southside; TM88; Get Money; Honorable C.N.O.T.E.; C4; DJ Spinz; Drumma Boy; Lex Luger; Zaytoven; Dun Deal

Gucci Mane chronology
Trap Back 2 (2013)	Trap House III (2013)	World War 3 (2013)

Trap House III is a commercial mixtape by American rapper Gucci Mane. The project serves as a sequel to his fifth album Back to the Trap House (2007). The project was released exclusively to digital download retailers on May 21, 2013 independently by 1017 Brick Squad Records and 101 Distribution. The project features guest appearances from Rick Ross, Rich Homie Quan, Wiz Khalifa, Shawty Lo, Young Scooter, Young Thug and Chief Keef among others.

== Background ==
On February 21, 2013, Gucci Mane announced he would be releasing a new project Trap House 3 The Guwop Edition on July 2, 2013. On February 21, 2013, the first song from the album "Dirty Cup" featuring 2 Chainz was released, though the song was eventually omitted from the project. On March 6, 2013, the cover art was released. On April 12, 2013, it was announced that the release date would be pushed up to May 21, 2013. On May 4, 2013, the music video for "Thirsty" was released. On May 9, 2013, the second song from the album "Darker" featuring Chief Keef was released On May 13, 2013, the third song from the project "Use Me" featuring 2 Chainz was released. On May 16, 2013, the fourth song from the project "Traphouse 3" featuring Rick Ross was released. On May 28, 2013, the music video was released for "Traphouse 3" featuring Rick Ross. On August 14, 2013, the music video was released for "Darker" featuring Chief Keef.

== Critical reception ==
Professional ratings
Aggregate scores
Source	Rating
Metacritic	61/100
Review scores
Source	Rating
AllMusic	3.5/5 stars
PopMatters	7/10
RapReviews	3/10
XXL	3/5

Trap House III was met with generally positive reviews. At Metacritic, which assigns a normalized rating out of 100 to reviews from professional publications, the mixtape received an average score of 61, based on five reviews.

Neil Martinez-Belkin XXL gave the album an L, saying "In all, Trap House III is Gucci’s strongest effort this year, perhaps his best since his 2012 “comeback tape,” Trap Back. The booming production and the Brick Squad CEO’s natural charisma make it so. The two aforementioned Auto-Tuned records also serve as proof that Gucci’s still more than capable of surprising listeners with some unexpected tricks up his sleeve. David Jeffries of AllMusic gave the album three and a half stars out of five, saying "Good times, some redundant numbers, all of it jumbled together, and everything else returning fans are used to (or frustrated by). Just be aware, Gucci's inspired by more serene and soft moments at this point, so call this the most "couch locked" of all Trap Houses and get prepared to sprawl out for a long, low ride."

== Commercial performance ==
The project debuted at number 175 on the Billboard 200 chart, with first-week sales of 2,500 copies in the United States.

== Track listing ==
No.	Title	Producer(s)	Length
1.	"Traphouse 3" (featuring Rick Ross)	Southside; TM88	3:48
2.	"Mama" (featuring SickPen)	Get Money	4:23
3.	"Use Me" (featuring 2 Chainz)	Honorable C.N.O.T.E.	3:50
4.	"Nuthin On Ya" (featuring Wiz Khalifa)	C4; DJ Spinz	4:01
5.	"Hell Yes"	Honorable C.N.O.T.E.	4:19
6.	"I Heard" (featuring Rich Homie Quan)	Honorable C.N.O.T.E.; Lex Luger	3:36
7.	"Fuck With Me"	Drumma Boy	3:00
8.	"Thirsty"	C4; DJ Spinz	3:37
9.	"Can't Trust Her" (featuring Rich Homie Quan)	Lex Luger	3:47
10.	"Darker" (featuring Chief Keef)	Southside; TM88	4:36
11.	"D.I.G. Dipped in Gold"	Drumma Boy	4:12
12.	"Tell Em' That" (featuring Shawty Lo & Peewee Longway)	C4; DJ Spinz	3:59
13.	"Muddy" (featuring Young Dolph & Young Scooter)	Zaytoven	4:15
14.	"Point In My Life"	Dun Deal	3:30
15.	"Chasen Paper" (featuring Rich Homie Quan & Young Thug)	Honorable C.N.O.T.E.	4:16
16.	"Off The Leash" (featuring Peewee Longway & Young Thug)	Honorable C.N.O.T.E.	4:50
17.	"Nobody"	Drumma Boy	3:05
Total length:			67:04

== Charts ==
Chart (2005)	Peak position
US Billboard 200	88
US Independent Albums (Billboard)	16
US Top R&B/Hip-Hop Albums (Billboard)	16
US Top Rap Albums (Billboard)	9
