= Cash Money (song) =

Single by Tyga
- Released: May 20, 2016
- Recorded: 2016
- Genre: Hip hop
- Length: 3:30
- Label: Last Kings
- Songwriters: Michael Stevenson; Alexander Edwards; Joseph Epperson
- Producer: CrakWav

Tyga singles chronology
"Baller Alert" (2015)	"Cash Money" (2016)	"1 of 1" (2016)

"Cash Money" is a song by American rapper Tyga. The song was released on 20 May 2016 as a standalone single. The song is produced by Crakwav. It is a diss track created by Tyga aimed at his former record label, Cash Money Records. The official music video was released on May 27, 2016, and credited Maria Skobeleva as director.

== Background and release ==
The song title references to his former record label, Cash Money Records. On June 23, 2015, Tyga was having a conflict with Cash Money Records regarding the release of his fourth and debut independent album, The Gold Album: 18th Dynasty, which was exclusively released on Spotify and later was released on iTunes under his Last Kings Records label. Following this, Tyga has decided to respond with a diss track towards Birdman and his record label Cash Money Records named, "Cash Money". Previously Tyga has claimed that he has had to fund for his own music videos during his time at Cash Money Records, moreover he claims that he wasn't being paid for his music and that the label wasn't letting him release his album for his fans.

Throughout the song, Tyga expresses his experience with his former label on behalf of artists and producers who have not been properly compensated for their work by Birdman at Cash Money Records. Tyga mentions Young Money founder, Lil Wayne, who at the time was having a similar issue with releasing his twelfth studio album, Tha Carter V.

The song samples lyrics from Big Tymers - Get Your Roll On.

== Track listing ==
Digital download
No.	Title	Length
1.	"Cash Money"	3:30
