= Private Club Records =

- Private Club Records
- Founded: 2014
- Founder: MadeinTYO; 24hrs
- Distributor(s): Warner Bros.
- Location: Los Angeles, USA
- Official website: privateclubrecords.com

Private Club Records is an American independent record label based in Los Angeles, California, and founded in 2014 in Atlanta. The record label was set up by brothers MadeinTYO who peaked at 122 on the Billboard 200 and 24HRS. Apart from acting as a record label, they also manage artists and act as tour promoters.

Private Club Records first came to attention after uploading MadeinTYO's song called "Uber Everywhere" which gained 55 million views and peaked at number 51 on the Billboard Hot 100.

Other notable artists part of the label include Salma Slims, Noah Woods, NephLon Don, MyNameIsPhin, and dwn2earth The record label also has a YouTube channel with close to 175,000 subscribers and over 90 million views.
