= 24hrs (rapper) =

American singer and rapper (born 1990)

- Also known as: Rolls Royce Rizzy; Royce Rizzy
- Born: Robert Dozier Davis III; December 1, 1990 (age 35); Oakland, California, U.S.
- Origin: Atlanta, Georgia, U.S.
- Genres: R&B; hip-hop
- Occupations: Singer; rapper; songwriter; record producer
- Years active: 2011–present
- Labels: Create; Rostrum; The MVMNT; Commission Music; Stacks on Deck; Private Club; So So Def; RCA; G$UP

Robert Dozier Davis III (born December 1, 1990), known professionally as 24hrs, is an American singer and rapper. He is best known for his 2016 single "What You Like" (featuring Ty Dolla Sign and Wiz Khalifa). He is the older brother of American rapper MadeinTYO.

== Early life ==
Davis was born in Oakland, California. He is the older brother to hip-hop recording artist MadeinTYO, with whom he worked early in his career. In the mid-2000s, they both moved together to Atlanta, Georgia.

== Career ==
24hrs began his artistry under the name Royce Rizzy in 2011. He released his first mixtape, Bag Muzik, under Lil Scrappy's G$UP label. His first change came about when he signed to Jermaine Dupri's So So Def Recordings label.

On December 12, 2016, Davis released "What You Like" (featuring Ty Dolla Sign and Wiz Khalifa). The song became popular in early February 2017, and was released to contemporary hit radio and rhythmic contemporary on the 27th of that month.

On November 16, 2018, Davis released his debut album, House on the Hill. The album featured executive production by Hit-Boy and Ty Dolla Sign, as well as guest appearances from Lil Pump, YG, Moneybagg Yo, Smokepurpp, and Dom Kennedy, among others.

== Discography ==
- 24hrs (2015)
- Open (2016)
- 12 AM (2016)
- Sunset Blvd (2016)
- 24hrs in Tokyo (with MadeinTYO) (2016)
- Open Late (2017)
- Not Open Late (2017)
- Night Shift (2017)
- 12 AM in Atlanta (2017)
- 3200 Lenox RD (2018)
- Houses on the Hill (2018)
- B4 XMAS (2018)
- Valentino Twenty (2019)
- World on Fire (2019)
- Dark Dreams Vol. 1 (2020)
- No Judge (with Corey Ellis) (2020)
- 12 AM in Atlanta 2 (with DJ Drama) (2020)
- Big Dog (2020)
- Big Dog 2.0 (2020)
- Real Walker (2021)
- Real Walker 1.5 (2021)
- Real Walker 2 (2023)
