= Young Scooter =

American rapper (1986–2025)

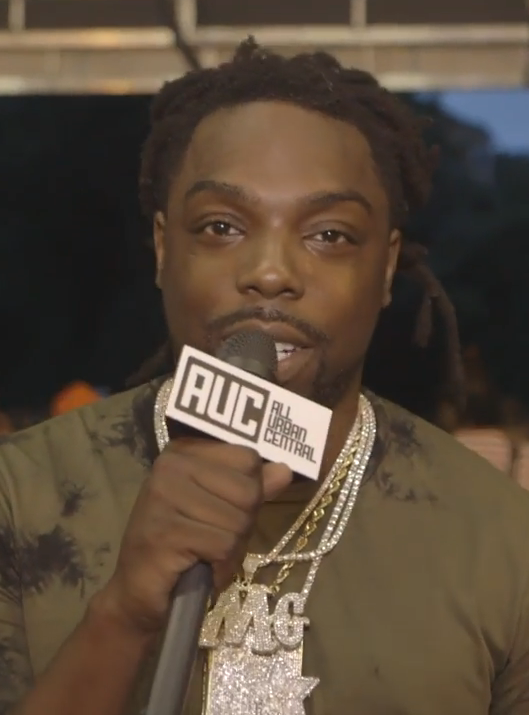
- Young Scooter in 2018

Background information
- Born: Kenneth Edward Rashad Bailey; March 28, 1986; Walterboro, South Carolina, U.S.
- Origin: Atlanta, Georgia, U.S.
- Died: March 28, 2025 (aged 39) Atlanta, Georgia, U.S.
- Genres: Hip-hop; trap
- Occupations: Rapper; songwriter
- Years active: 2006–2025
- Labels: Black Migo Gang; Freebandz; Brick Squad Monopoly; 1017

Kenneth Edward Rashad Bailey (March 28, 1986 – March 28, 2025), better known by his stage name Young Scooter, was an American rapper. He was one of the first acts to sign with fellow Atlanta rapper Future's record label, Freebandz, in 2012. In 2013, he jointly signed with Waka Flocka Flame's Brick Squad Monopoly, an imprint of Gucci Mane's 1017 Records. He is known for his mixtape Street Lottery (2012) and its lead single, "Colombia". His guest appearance on Future and Juice Wrld's 2018 song "Jet Lag" marked his sole entry on the Billboard Hot 100.

== Early life and career ==
Kenneth Edward Rashad Bailey was born on March 28, 1986 in Walterboro, South Carolina. When he was nine, his family moved Atlanta, Georgia, settling in Kirkwood (also known as "Lil Mexico"). Scooter was a childhood friend with fellow Atlanta rapper Future, and decided to pursue a career in music after being charged with drug trafficking in 2008.

While his first mixtape Plug Talkin did not receive much attention, with his second release Finessin and Flexin' he made a name for himself, already collaborating with Future.

Scooter's real breakthrough came in January 2013, when he released his mixtape Street Lottery. SPIN named it "Rap release of the week" and XXL featured it on its "Best mixtapes of January" list. Eric Diep of XXL called Scooter "one of the hottest street rappers coming out of Atlanta" and wrote that tracks like the single "Colombia" and "Street Lottery" (featuring Bun B) are "proof of his undeniable talent". The tape was also a viral success gaining over 100,000 downloads on DatPiff.

The official video for "Colombia", directed by Decatur Dan, premiered on MTV on January 31. The song became a hit in the south, especially in Scooter's hometown Atlanta. Brandon Soderberg of SPIN classified it as a mix of Rick Ross' "Hustlin'" and Future's "Tony Montana". By the end of the month, an official remix with rappers Rick Ross, Birdman and Gucci Mane was released. Lil Wayne also covered the song for his mixtape Dedication 5. The rapper's recent success prompted OnSmash to state "the buzz for Scooter is at an all-time high."

== Musical style ==
Scooter was known for his freestyle type of rapping, without writing down his lyrics, similarly to Gucci Mane. He defined his style as "count music", and explained it in an interview with Complex: "I don't really care what I say on a beat as long as it's about some money. When you try to think hard and write it out, that's when it's gonna be fucked up."

Scooter's lyrical themes were largely about money and drugs. David Drake of Complex compared his "populist, kingpin rapping" to that of Young Jeezy, although he noted that Scooter doesn't have the "all-encompassing grandiosity" of his fellow Atlanta rapper.

Scooter listed his influences as Jay-Z, 50 Cent and Sean Combs.

== Legal issues ==
On April 8, 2013, Bailey was arrested for probation violation during a traffic stop in DeKalb County, Georgia. According to HipHopDX, Bailey shared a jail cell with frequent collaborator Gucci Mane, who was arrested for probation violation on April 12, 2013. Bailey spent six months in custody before being released in mid-October 2013. On March 2, 2015, he was released off probation.

== Death ==
Bailey died on March 28, 2025, his 39th birthday, in Atlanta, Georgia, while attempting to flee from the Atlanta Police Department. Authorities responded to a 911 call reporting a dispute involving gunfire and a woman whom Bailey had forcibly brought back into a house. Once officers arrived, Bailey and another man fled. While trying to escape, Bailey accidentally penetrated his thigh and severed his femoral artery after jumping over two fences. He was taken to Grady Memorial Hospital, where he later died. The cause of death was exsanguination as a result of the injury.

== Discography ==
=== Mixtapes ===
List of mixtapes, with year released
Title	Album details	Peak chart positions	
Title	Album details	US Ind.	US Heat.
Finessin' & Flexin'	Released: September 26, 2011; Hosted by DJ Swamp Izzo & The Empire; Label: Black Migo Gang, Freebandz; Format: Digital download	—	—
Married to the Streets	Released: January 21, 2012; Hosted by DJ Swamp Izzo, DJ Green Lantern & DJ Smallz; Label: Black Migo Gang, Freebandz; Format: Digital download	—	—
Plug Brothers (with Cartel MGM)	Released: June 27, 2012; Hosted by Trap-A-Holics, DJ Swamp Izzo & DJ Spinz; Label: Brick Squad Monopoly, Black Migo Gang, Freebandz; Format: Digital download	—	—
Voice of the Streetz	Released: November 2, 2012; Hosted by DJ Swamp Izzo; Label: Black Migo Gang, Freebandz; Format: Digital download	—	—
Street Lottery	Released: January 1, 2013; Hosted by DJ Swamp Izzo & DJ Scream; Label: Black Migo Gang, Freebandz; Format: Digital download	—	—
Free Bricks 2 (with Gucci Mane)	Released: February 28, 2013; Hosted by DJ Scream & DJ Spinz; Label: Black Migo Gang, Freebandz, 1017 Records; Format: Digital download	—	—
From the Cell Block to Your Block	Released: August 29, 2013; Hosted by DJ Swamp Izzo; Label: Black Migo Gang, Freebandz; Format: Digital download	—	—
Street Lottery 2	Released: January 1, 2014; Hosted by DJ Swamp Izzo; Label: Black Migo Gang, Freebandz; Format: Digital download	—	—
80's Baby	Released: July 5, 2014; Label: Black Migo Gang, Freebandz; Format: Digital download	—	—
Jug Season	Released: January 27, 2015; Hosted by DJ Swamp Izzo & OG Double D; Label: Black Migo Gang, Freebandz; Format: Digital download	—	—
Juggathon (with Zaytoven)	Released: May 27, 2015; Label: Familiar Territory, Black Migo Gang, Freebandz; Format: Digital download	—	—
Married to the Streets 2	Released: November 3, 2015; Hosted by DJ Swamp Izzo; Label: Black Migo Gang, Freebandz; Format: Digital download	—	—
Street Lottery 3	Released: April 27, 2016; Hosted by DJ Swamp Izzo; Label: Black Migo Gang, Freebandz; Format: Digital download	—	—
The Dream Team (with Ralo)	Released: May 27, 2016; Label: Black Migo Gang, Freebandz, Famerica; Format: Digital download	—	—
Jugg King	Released: July 13, 2017; Label: Black Migo Gang, Freebandz; Format: Digital download, streaming	36	15
Trippple Cross	Released: February 23, 2018; Label: Black Migo Gang, Freebandz; Format: Digital download, streaming	19	7
The Recipe	Released: December 21, 2018; Label: Black Migo Gang, Freebandz; Format: Digital download, streaming	—	—
Trap Hero	Released: November 8, 2019; Label: Black Migo Gang, Freebandz; Format: Digital download, streaming	—	17
Street Lottery Reloaded	Released: February 18, 2020; Label: Black Migo Gang, Freebandz; Format: Digital download, streaming	—	—
Zaystreet (with Zaytoven)	Released: December 11, 2020; Label: Familiar Territory, Black Migo Gang, Freebandz; Format: Digital download, streaming	—	—
Streetz Krazy	Released: October 20, 2023; Label: Black Migo Gang, Freebandz; Format: Digital download, streaming	—	—
Trap's Last Hope	Released: March 21, 2024; Label: Black Migo Gang, Freebandz; Format: Digital download, streaming	—	—
Fast Lane Juugin	Released: February 4, 2025; Label: Black Migo Gang, Freebandz; Format: Digital download, streaming	—	—

=== Singles ===
==== As lead artist ====
Title	Year	Album
"Colombia"	2012	Street Lottery
"DI$Function" (featuring Future, Juicy J and Young Thug)	2014	Count Music
"Dope Boys & Trap Gods" (with Zaytoven featuring 2 Chainz and Rick Ross)	2020	Zaystreet

==== As featured artist ====
Title	Year	Peak chart positions				Certifications	Album
Title	Year	US	US R&B/HH	CAN	NZ Hot	Certifications	Album
"Jet Lag" (Future and Juice Wrld featuring Young Scooter)	2018	72	45	87	29	RIAA: Gold	Wrld on Drugs

=== Other charted songs ===
Title	Year	Peak chart positions		Certifications	Album
Title	Year	US Bub.	US R&B/HH	Certifications	Album
"Guwop" (Young Thug featuring Quavo, Offset and Young Scooter)	2016	10	45	RIAA: Platinum; MC: Gold	Jeffery
"Doh Doh" (Future featuring Young Scooter)	2018	12	—		Beast Mode 2

=== Guest appearances ===
List of non-single guest appearances, with other performing artists, showing year released and album name
Title	Year	Other artist(s)	Album
"Birds Take a Bath"	2012	Future, Jeezy	Astronaut Status
"Anything You Want"	2012	Dose, Future	Foreign Dreams
"All We Do"	2012	Yung Ralph	Juugman Reloaded
"Plug Relation"	2012	Cartel MGM	Hood Azz Mexikan
"Smoke Alarm"	2012	Cartel MGM	Hood Azz Mexikan
"Money Habits"	2012	Gucci Mane	Trap God
"Don't Trust"	2012	Gucci Mane	Trap God
"Rolly Up"	2012	Gucci Mane, Waka Flocka Flame	Trap God
"Shooter"	2012	Gucci Mane, Yung Fresh	Trap God
"Dead Man"	2012	Gucci Mane, Trae tha Truth	Trap God
"Fuck Something"	2012	Gucci Mane, Kirko Bangz, Waka Flocka Flame	Trap God
"Sky Diving"	2012	OG Boo Dirty, Gucci Mane	Definition Of A G
"On It"	2012	Mike WiLL Made It, Chief Keef	Est. In 1989 2.5
"Muphucka"	2013	Mexico Rann	F.B.G: The Movie
"Missing"	2013	Future, Big Bank Blank	F.B.G: The Movie
"Everything Ours"	2013	Future	F.B.G: The Movie
"Appeal"	2013	—N/a	F.B.G: The Movie
"Murda She Wrote"	2013	Waka Flocka Flame, Cartel MGM	Duflocka Rant 2
"Fuck With It"	2013	Young Thug	1017 Thug
"Big Guwap"	2013	Gucci Mane	Trap God 2
"Bullet Wound"	2013	Gucci Mane, Lil Wayne	Trap God 2
"I Need More"	2013	Fredo Santana	Fredo Kruger
"I'm Good"	2013	Future	The Mission
"New Money"	2013	Shawty Lo, Cash Out	I'm Da Man 4
"Plug Prices"	2013	OJ da Juiceman	6 Ringz Vol. 2
"Holmes"	2013	Migos, Gucci Mane	—N/a
"Who U Wit"	2013	Verse Simmonds, Yo Gotti, Trouble	—N/a
"Can't Handle Me"	2013	Gucci Mane, Young Dolph	EastAtlantaMemphis
"Investigation"	2013	Gucci Mane, Young Dolph, Big Bank Black	EastAtlantaMemphis
"Play No Games" (Remix)	2013	Frenchie	Long Overdue
"Done It All"	2013	Casino	Ex Drug Dealer
"Short Fuse"	2013	Waka Flocka Flame, Eldorado Red	DuFlocka Rant: Halftime Show
"Grew Up"	2013	Young Dolph, Project Pat	High Class Street Music 3: Trappin Out A Mansion
"Muddy"	2013	Gucci Mane, Young Dolph	Trap House III
"Money Counter"	2013	Alley Boy	War Cry
"Topside"	2013	Gunplay, Young Breed	Acquitted
"Maserati"	2013	Philthy Rich, Gucci Mane	N.E.R.N.L. 2
"Ea$tside"	2013	Trinidad James, Gucci Mane, Alley Boy, Childish Gambino	10 PC Mild
"Faces"	2013	Gucci Mane	World War 3: Lean
"Cali"	2013	Gucci Mane	Diary of a Trap God
"Recognize"	2013	Gucci Mane, Akon	Diary of a Trap God
"Pickup and Dropoffs"	2013	Chevy Woods	Gang Land 2
"Convict"	2013	Donkey	Loyalty Means Everything
"Project Building"	2013	E-40, Gucci Mane	The Block Brochure: Welcome To The Soil 5
"Big Plays"	2014	Taylor J	—N/a
"What You Said"	2014	Project Pat	Cheez N Dope 3: Street God
"Guwop"	2016	Young Thug, Quavo, Offset	Jeffery
"Rain"	2017	VL Deck	The Appetizer
"Back On It"	2018	Zaytoven, Offset	Trapholizay
"Never Too Late"	2018	Ralo	Conspiracy
"DOH DOH"	2018	Future, Zaytoven	Beast Mode 2
"Jet Lag"	2018	Future, Juice Wrld	Wrld on Drugs
"Patek Watch"	2018	VL Deck	Project Music Vol. 1
"Crops"	2019	VL Deck	Project Music Vol. 2
"Wave"	2019	VL Deck	Trap Pastor
"Millions"	2019	Cassius Jay, OJ da Juiceman	God Bless Da 6
"Stayed Down"	2022	Future	I Never Liked You

=== Music videos ===
==== As lead artist ====
List of music videos, with directors, showing year released
Title	Year	Director(s)
"77 Birds" (featuring Gucci Mane)	2012	G Visuals
"Cash Money"	2012	Cricket
"The Corner"	2012	Cricket
"Down Bad"	2012	G Visuals
"Hardest Thing In Life"	2012	G Rank
"Flying Packs" (featuring Cartel MGM)	2012	GT Films
"Colombia"	2013	Decatur Dan
"Street Lights" (featuring Gucci Mane and OJ da Juiceman)	2013	Mr. Boomtown
"Streets Talking" (featuring Shyst Red)	2013	Cam Kirk
"Colombia" (Remix) (featuring Rick Ross, Birdman and Gucci Mane)	2013	Gabriel Hart

==== As featured artist ====
List of music videos, with directors, showing year released
Title	Year	Director(s)
"Anything You Want" (Dose featuring Future and Young Scooter)	2012	G. Visuals
"All We Do" (Yung Ralph featuring Young Scooter)	2012	Cricket
"Money Habits" (Gucci Mane featuring Young Scooter)	2012	Cricket
"Dead Man" (Gucci Mane featuring Young Scooter and Trae tha Truth)	2012	Philly Fly Boy
"New Money" (Shawty Lo featuring Cash Out and Young Scooter)	2013	GT Films
"Shooter" (Gucci Mane featuring Young Scooter and Yung Fresh)	2013	Mr. Boomtown
"Holmes" (Migos featuring Young Scooter and Gucci Mane)	2013	Mike Ryan
