= MadeinTYO =

American rapper (born 1992)

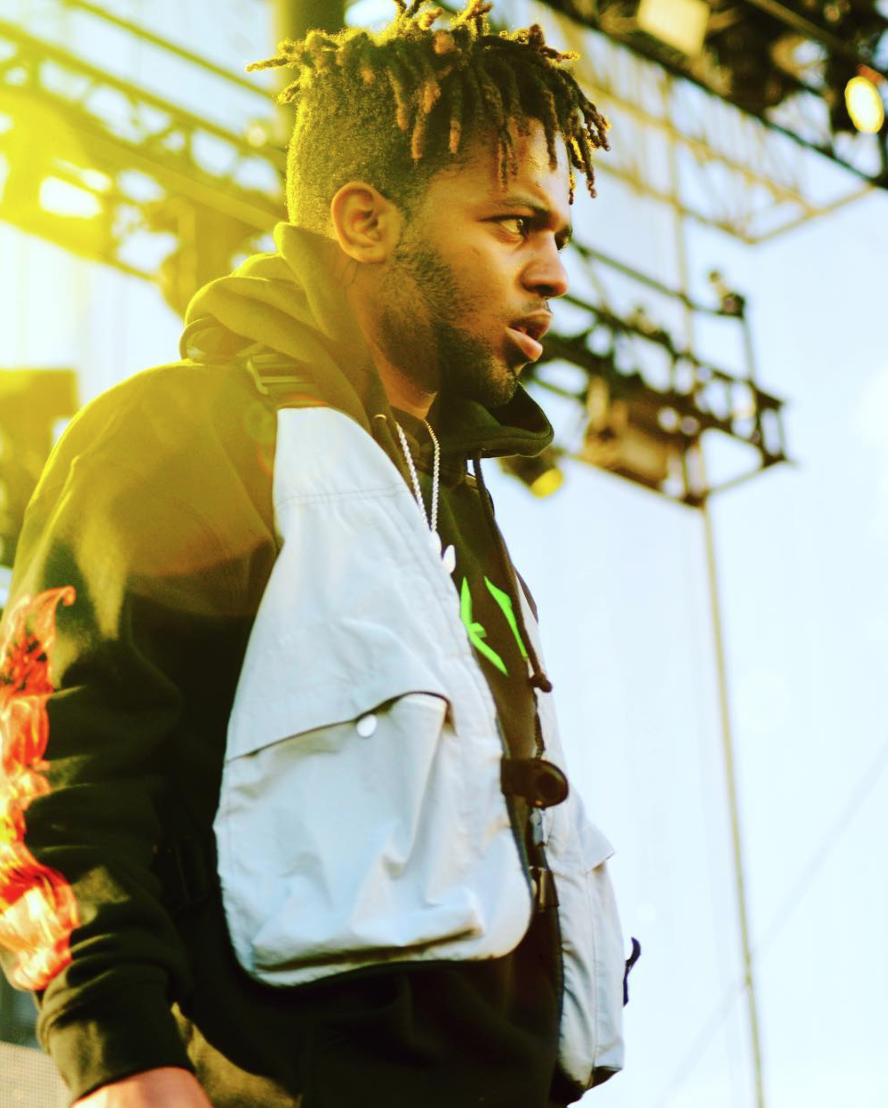
- MadeinTYO performing in 2018

Background information
- Also known as: MadeinTYO; Made in Tokyo; Mr. Tokyo; (Jamaal) Davis
- Born: Malcolm Jamaal Davis; April 12, 1992 (age 34); Honolulu, Hawaii, U.S.
- Origin: Tokyo, Japan; Atlanta, Georgia, U.S.
- Genres: Alternative hip-hop; trap; SoundCloud rap
- Occupations: Rapper; singer; songwriter
- Years active: 2015–present
- Labels: Ingrooves; Private Club; MadeInSounds; Warner; Big Noise
- Relatives: 24hrs (brother)
- Children: 1
- Website: madeintyo.com

Malcolm Jamaal Davis (born April 12, 1992), better known by his stage name MadeinTYO (pronounced Made in Tokyo), is an American rapper, singer, and songwriter. He is best known for his 2016 single "Uber Everywhere", which peaked at number 51 on the Billboard Hot 100. It spawned a remixed version featuring Travis Scott, which served as lead single for his debut mixtape, You Are Forgiven (2016). His debut studio album, Sincerely, Tokyo (2018), peaked at number 98 on the Billboard 200.

== Early life ==
Malcolm Jamaal Davis was born on April 12, 1992, in Honolulu, Hawaii. He grew up as a military brat, moving around and living in areas such as Hawaii, California, Texas, New York, and Virginia, before spending the rest of his teenage years in Tokyo, Japan. Davis was inspired to begin writing music after watching his cousin produce music in his room while living in Washington, D.C.

After he came back from a trip from Tokyo to the United States, Davis moved to Atlanta with his older brother 24hrs for his later young adulthood.

== Career ==
MadeinTYO released his debut single titled "Uber Everywhere" on February 26, 2016, on Commission Music and Private Club Records. The song peaked at number 51 on the Billboard Hot 100 and number 10 on urban radio. The official remix of the song featured American rapper Travis Scott. The single was eventually certified double platinum by the Recording Industry Association of America (RIAA). His subsequent singles, "I Want" (featuring 2 Chainz) and "Skateboard P", were certified gold and platinum by the RIAA. The remix version of the latter features rapper Big Sean was released on November 4, 2016.

In April 2016, MadeinTYO premiered his debut mixtape, You Are Forgiven. It was commercially released on iTunes in August 2016. You Are Forgiven peaked at number 122 on the Billboard 200. According to Business Insider, MadeinTYO was one of the top five most streamed new artists of 2016 on Spotify. MadeinTYO released two EPs, 24Hrs in Tokyo (a collaboration with his brother, 24hrs) and True's World, in 2016 and 2017, respectively.

In 2017, MadeinTYO was selected for that year's XXL freshman class list along with A Boogie wit da Hoodie, PnB Rock, Playboi Carti, Ugly God, Kyle, Aminé, Kamaiyah, Kap G, and XXXTentacion.

On June 1, 2018, MadeinTYO released a single "Ned Flanders" featuring rapper ASAP Ferg. It later served as the lead single from his debut studio album, Sincerely, Tokyo, released on October 26, 2018.

On October 30, 2020, he released his second studio album, Never Forgotten. The album had features from artists including J Balvin, Young Nudy, and Ty Dolla Sign.

In 2021, a collaborative album with UnoTheActivist titled Yokohama was released. On February 19, 2021, he officially released the single "Hunniddolla", which as of March 2024 had over 82 million streams on Spotify.

In 2023, he released his third studio album, Neo TYO. The album consists of 12 tracks featuring Famous Dex among other artists.

In 2024, he released the album TYO 808, with 18 tracks.

== Artistry ==
In an XXL interview, Davis cited Pharrell, 24hrs, Gucci Mane, and M.I.A. as influences.

== Personal life ==
Davis began dating Philadelphia based painter and digital artist Distortedd (real name Anhia Santana), in late 2015. The couple announced that they were expecting a baby boy in June 2016 via social media. Their son was born on January 29, 2017. The couple announced that they were engaged in February 2017. The engagement was later called off. Davis lives in Los Angeles with his son.

== Discography ==
- Sincerely, Tokyo (2018)
- Never Forgotten (2020)
- Neo TYO (2023)
- TYO 808 (2024)
