= TM88 =

American record producer (born 1987)

- Also known as: Bart Sacii; TM808; TM-88
- Born: Bryan Lamar Simmons; April 4, 1987 (age 38); Miami, Florida, U.S.
- Origin: Atlanta, Georgia, U.S.
- Genres: Hip hop; trap
- Occupations: Record producer; songwriter
- Years active: 2008–present
- Labels: 1017; Taylor Gang; Empire; Capitol
- Member of: 808 Mafia; TGOD Mafia
- Website: tm88world.com

Bryan Lamar Simmons (born April 4, 1987), known professionally as TM88, is an American record producer. He is part of the Atlanta-based record production team 808 Mafia, as one of its lead members alongside Southside. Simmons produced the 2017 hit single "XO Tour Llif3" by Lil Uzi Vert, which peaked at number seven on the Billboard Hot 100 and received diamond certification by the Recording Industry Association of America (RIAA). His other notable production credits include Young Thug, Future, Gucci Mane, Migos, Wiz Khalifa, and Juicy J, and formed the group TGOD Mafia with the latter two in 2016, with whom he released a collaborative studio album in June of that year.

== Early life and career ==
Bryan Lamar Simmons was born on April 4, 1987, in Miami, Florida. He lived in Eufaula, Alabama before settling in Atlanta, Georgia.

In 2009, Simmons, aged 22, began producing instrumentals for Slim Dunkin, an artist on Brick Squad Monopoly before his murder in late 2011. He was introduced to Southside, whom he started working with. Southside later invited him to join his production team 808 Mafia. In 2012, TM88 had his first major placement as a solo producer on Waka Flocka Flame's song "Lurkin", off his second studio album Triple F Life: Friends, Fans & Family.

In 2013, Simmons worked with Gucci Mane, and landed a placement on his commercial mixtape, Trap House III (2013). He was later credited on Future's second studio album, Honest on the track "Special".

== Discography ==
=== Albums ===
List of albums, with date released and peak chart positions
Title	Album details	Peak chart positions		
Title	Album details	US	US R&B/HH	US Ind.
Rude Awakening (with Wiz Khalifa and Juicy J as TGOD Mafia)	Released: June 3, 2016; Label: Atlantic, Columbia, Empire; Format: Digital download	26	3	5

=== Mixtapes ===
List of mixtapes, with selected details
Title	Album details
Nintendo 88 (with Slugg Mania)	Released: February 2, 2015; Label: Self-released; Format: Digital download
Sacii Lyfe	Released: April 17, 2015; Label: Self-released; Format: Digital download
88World	Released: February 19, 2016; Label: Self-released; Format: Digital download
88 Birdz (with Doe Boy)	Released: August 21, 2018; Label: Freebandz, Rubberband Money Gang; Format: Digital download
Yo!88 (with Pi'erre Bourne)	Released: December 10, 2021; Label: Capitol, Interscope; Format: Digital download

=== EPs ===
List of extended plays, with selected details
Title	Album details
Route 80 (with Larry June)	Released: October 21, 2014; Label: Self-released; Formats: Digital download

=== Singles ===
==== As lead artist ====
Title	Year
Chill (with Rocko; as Carte Blanche; featuring Yakki Divioshi)	2014
Lifted (featuring NephewTexasBoy, Ethan Sacii and Que)	2015
Bando (with MDMA Chill)	2015
88 Will Kill Bill Volume 1	2015
88 Will Kill Bill Volume 2	2015
Been Through a Lot (featuring Young Thug and Lil Yachty)	2016
XO Tour Llif3 (with Lil Uzi Vert)	2017
Mood (with Lil Uzi Vert)	2018
Order (with Southside and Gunna)	2018
Hmmm (with Southside featuring Valee and Lil Yachty)	2018
Slayerr (featuring Lil Uzi Vert)	2019
So High (featuring Roy Woods and Wiz Khalifa)	2020
Block Boy (with Pi'erre Bourne)	2021

==== As featured artist ====
Title	Year	Album
Thug Ciity (DJ Outta Space featuring Young Sizzle, TM88, NephewTexasBoy, Spiiker, Ethan Sacii, and Spihug City)	2015	Free Agent 2
