= Wiz Khalifa discography =

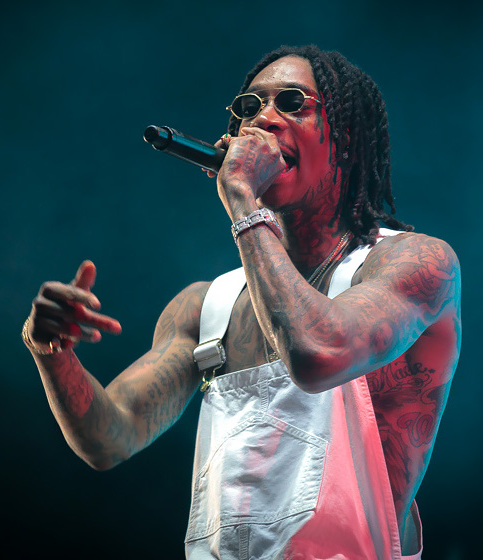
- Wiz Khalifa performing in 2018
- Studio albums: 7
- Extended plays: 11
- Soundtrack albums: 1
- Singles: 107
- Music videos: 82
- Mixtapes: 26
- Promotional singles: 17
- Compilation albums: 1
- Collaborative albums: 5

The discography of Wiz Khalifa, an American rapper, consists of 7 studio albums, 1 compilation album, 1 soundtrack album, 11 extended plays (EP), 5 collaborative albums, 107 singles (including 52 as a featured artist), 17 promotional singles, 26 mixtapes, and 82 music videos. After signing to the Pittsburgh-based independent label Rostrum Records as a teenager, Khalifa released his first mixtape, Prince of the City: Welcome to Pistolvania, and his first studio album, Show and Prove (2006). Following the release of Show and Prove, Warner Bros. Records signed Khalifa as part of a joint deal with Rostrum in 2007. At Warner, Khalifa released the singles, "Youngin' on His Grind" and "Say Yeah". The latter became his first song to appear on a Billboard chart, peaking at number 20 on the US Hot Rap Songs. Disagreements with Warner over the release of a purported major-label debut album led Khalifa to part ways with the label, and release his second studio album, Deal or No Deal (2009) on Rostrum Records.

His eighth mixtape, Kush & Orange Juice (2010), garnered widespread attention after topping Google's Hot Search Trends list. This brought Khalifa to the attention of Atlantic Records, who promptly signed him. Khalifa's first single for the label, "Black and Yellow", achieved significant commercial success in the United States, peaking atop the US Billboard Hot 100 and peaking within the top ten of both the Canadian Hot 100 and UK Singles Charts. The song has since received nine-times platinum certification by the Recording Industry Association of America (RIAA) for selling 9,000,000 units. His follow-up singles, "Roll Up", "On My Level" (featuring Too Short) and "No Sleep", each entered the top 40 of the Billboard Hot 100; all of which preceded Khalifa's third album and major label debut record, Rolling Papers (2011), which peaked at number two on the US Billboard 200 and received gold certification by the RIAA. In 2011, Khalifa guest appeared on the single "5 O'Clock" by T-Pain, and released the single "Young, Wild & Free" (with Snoop Dogg featuring Bruno Mars); both songs peaked within the top ten of the Billboard Hot 100.

Khalifa's fourth studio album, O.N.I.F.C. (2012), was preceded by the release of the singles "Work Hard, Play Hard" and "Remember You" (featuring the Weeknd), both of which peaked within the top 75 of the Billboard Hot 100. Several other songs from O.N.I.F.C. also charted upon the album's release; "Let It Go" (featuring Akon) debuted and peaked at number 87 on the Billboard Hot 100. Following the release of "Work Hard, Play Hard", Khalifa collaborated with pop rock band Maroon 5 on their single "Payphone", which peaked at number two on the Billboard Hot 100 and entered the top ten in Australia, New Zealand and Switzerland charts. "Payphone" became Khalifa's first song to peak the UK singles chart. Following its release in the United States on December 4, 2012, O.N.I.F.C. peaked at number two on the Billboard 200 and topped both the Top R&B/Hip-Hop Albums and Top Rap Albums charts. Blacc Hollywood followed in 2014, and included the single "We Dem Boyz", which peaked at number 43 on the Billboard Hot 100. Khalifa, a compilation album composed of songs from 2009 onwards, was released on February 5, 2016, and spawned a moderate hit single "Bake Sale" (featuring Travis Scott). The sequel to his debut album with Atlantic Records, Rolling Papers 2 was released in 2018 and peaked at number two on the Billboard 200.

== Albums ==
=== Studio albums ===
List of studio albums, with selected chart positions and certifications
Title	Album details	Peak chart positions										Certifications
Title	Album details	US	US R&B/HH	US Rap	AUS	CAN	FRA	GER	NLD	SWI	UK	Certifications
Show and Prove	Released: September 5, 2006; Label: Rostrum; Format: CD, digital download	—	—	—	—	—	—	—	—	—	—	
Deal or No Deal	Released: November 24, 2009; Label: Rostrum; Format: CD, LP, digital download	—	25	10	—	—	—	—	—	—	—	
Rolling Papers	Released: March 29, 2011; Label: Rostrum, Atlantic; Format: CD, LP, digital download	2	1	1	77	6	60	67	49	68	47	RIAA: 3× Platinum; MC: Gold; BPI: Silver; RMNZ: Platinum
O.N.I.F.C.	Released: December 4, 2012; Label: Rostrum, Atlantic; Format: CD, LP, digital download	2	1	1	45	14	20	10	15	9	10	RIAA: Platinum
Blacc Hollywood	Released: August 19, 2014; Label: Rostrum, Atlantic; Format: CD, LP, digital download	1	1	1	26	1	31	12	56	7	27	RIAA: Platinum; MC: Gold
Rolling Papers 2	Released: July 13, 2018; Label: Taylor Gang, Atlantic; Format: CD, digital download	2	2	2	55	4	—	46	23	20	62	RIAA: Platinum
Multiverse	Released: July 29, 2022; Label: Taylor Gang, Asylum; Format: LP, digital download	—	—	—	—	—	—	—	—	—	—	
Khaotic	Released: January 16, 2026; Label: Taylor Gang; Format: Digital download	—	—	—	—	—	—	—	—	—	—	
Cool	Released: November 13, 2026; Label: Taylor Gang; Format: Digital download	—	—	—	—	—	—	—	—	—	—	
"—" denotes a recording that did not chart or was not released in that territory.

=== Collaborative albums ===
List of collaborative albums, with selected chart positions
Title	Album details	Peak chart positions			
Title	Album details	US	US R&B/HH	US Rap	CAN
Rude Awakening (with Juicy J and TM88 as TGOD Mafia)	Released: June 3, 2016; Label: Atlantic, Columbia, Empire; Format: Digital download, streaming	26	3	3	81
2009 (with Curren$y)	Released: February 8, 2019; Label: Jet Life, Atlantic; Format: Digital download, streaming	35	19	17	—
Wiz Got Wings (with Sledgren and Cardo)	Released: December 10, 2021; Label: Taylor Gang; Format: Digital download	—	—	—	—
Stoner's Night (with Juicy J)	Released: February 11, 2022; Label: Trippy Music; Format: Digital download	—	—	—	—
Full Court Press (with Big K.R.I.T., Smoke DZA and Girl Talk)	Released: April 8, 2022; Label: Taylor Gang, Asylum; Format: Digital download	—	—	—	—
Roofless Records for Drop Tops: Disc 1 (with Curren$y)	Released: April 2, 2026; Label: Taylor Gang; Format: Digital download	—	—	—	—
"—" denotes a recording that did not chart or was not released in that territory.

=== Compilation albums ===
List of compilation albums, with selected chart positions
Title	Album details	Peak chart positions									
Title	Album details	US	US R&B/HH	US Rap	AUS	CAN	FRA	GER	NLD	SWI	UK
Khalifa	Released: February 5, 2016; Label: Atlantic; Format: Digital download, streaming	6	3	2	48	11	99	55	73	83	45

=== Soundtrack albums ===
List of soundtrack albums, with selected chart positions and certifications
Title	Album details	Peak chart positions			Certifications
Title	Album details	US	US R&B/HH	US Rap	Certifications
Mac & Devin Go to High School (with Snoop Dogg)	Released: December 13, 2011; Label: Rostrum, Doggystyle, Atlantic; Format: CD, digital download	29	6	3	RIAA: Platinum; RMNZ: Platinum
Moses the Black	Released: January 30, 2026; Label: Taylor Gang; Format: Digital download	—	—	—	

== Extended plays ==
List of extended plays, with selected chart positions
Title	EP details	Peak chart positions		
Title	EP details	US	US R&B/HH	US Rap
Live in Concert (with Curren$y)	Released: April 20, 2013; Label: Jet Life, Rostrum; Format: Digital download	30	8	7
Talk About It in the Morning (with Ty Dolla Sign)	Released: March 31, 2015; Label: Taylor Gang; Format: Digital download	—	—	—
O.N.I.F.C: 4 Years Anniversary	Released: December 4, 2016; Label: Taylor Gang; Format: Digital Download	—	—	—
Kush & OJ: 7 Years Anniversary	Released: April 15, 2017; Label: Taylor Gang; Format: Digital download	—	—	—
Pre-Rolleds	Released: June 3, 2017; Label: Taylor Gang; Format: Digital download	—	—	—
Bong Rips	Released: June 24, 2017; Label: Taylor Gang; Format: Digital download	—	—	—
It's Only Weed Bro	Released: February 11, 2020; Label: Taylor Gang; Format: Digital download	—	—	—
The Saga of Wiz Khalifa	Released: April 20, 2020; Label: Taylor Gang, Rostrum; Format: Digital download	48	29	23
3 Doobies	Released: July 28, 2020; Label: Taylor Gang; Format: Digital download	—	—	—
Just a Regular Day	Released: December 31, 2020; Label: Taylor Gang; Format: Digital download	—	—	—
Taylor Cinema	Released: October 8, 2021; Label: Taylor Gang; Format: Digital download	—	—	—
Roofless Records for Drop Tops: Disc 2 (with Curren$y & Harry Fraud)	Released: April 28, 2026; Label: Jet Life, Taylor Gang, SRFSCHL; Format: Digital download	—	—	—
"—" denotes a recording that did not chart or was not released in that territory.

== Mixtapes ==
List of mixtapes, with selected chart positions
Title	Mixtape details	Peak chart positions		
Title	Mixtape details	US	US R&B/HH	US Rap
Prince of the City: Welcome to Pistolvania	Released: 2005; Label: Taylor Gang, Rostrum; Format: Digital download	—	—	—
Grow Season	Released: 2007; Label: Taylor Gang, Rostrum; Format: Digital download	—	—	—
Prince of the City 2	Released: November 20, 2007; Label: Taylor Gang, Rostrum; Format: Digital download	—	—	—
Star Power	Released: September 17, 2008; Label: Taylor Gang, Rostrum; Format: Digital download	—	—	—
Flight School	Released: April 17, 2009; Label: Taylor Gang, Rostrum; Format: Digital download	—	97	—
How Fly (with Curren$y)	Released: August 9, 2009; Label: Jets International, Taylor Gang, Rostrum; Format: Digital download	—	—	—
Burn After Rolling	Released: November 2, 2009; Label: Taylor Gang, Rostrum; Format: Digital download	—	—	—
Kush & Orange Juice	Released: April 14, 2010; Label: Taylor Gang, Rostrum; Format: Digital download	—	—	—
Cabin Fever	Released: February 17, 2011; Label: Taylor Gang, Rostrum; Format: Digital download	—	—	—
Taylor Allderdice	Released: March 13, 2012; Label: Taylor Gang, Rostrum; Format: Digital download	—	—	—
Cabin Fever 2	Released: October 16, 2012; Label: Taylor Gang, Rostrum; Format: Digital download	—	—	—
28 Grams	Released: May 25, 2014; Label: Taylor Gang, Rostrum; Format: Digital download	—	—	—
Cabin Fever 3	Released: December 15, 2015; Label: Taylor Gang, Rostrum; Format: Digital download	—	—	—
TGOD Volume 1 (with Taylor Gang)	Released: October 11, 2016; Label: Taylor Gang, Rostrum; Format: Digital download	—	—	—
Laugh Now, Fly Later	Released: November 9, 2017; Label: Taylor Gang, Rostrum; Format: Digital download	29	14	11
Fly Times, Vol. 1: The Good Fly Young	Released: April 20, 2019; Label: Taylor Gang, Rostrum; Format: Digital download	70	38	—
Big Pimpin	Released: September 9, 2020; Label: Taylor Gang; Format: Digital download	—	—	—
#Fucc2020 (with DJ DaddyKat)	Released: January 1, 2021; Label: Taylor Gang; Format: Digital download	—	—	—
Taylor Nights (with Taylor Gang and DJ DaddyKat)	Released: February 19, 2021; Label: Taylor Gang; Format: Digital download	—	—	—
G Rage (with Taylor Gang)	Released: October 28, 2022; Label: Taylor Gang; Format: Digital download	—	—	—
See Ya	Released: June 14, 2023; Label: Taylor Gang; Format: Digital download	—	—	—
Khali Sober	Released: October 6, 2023; Label: Taylor Gang; Format: Digital download	—	—	—
Decisions	Released: December 1, 2023; Label: Taylor Gang; Format: Digital download	—	—	—
Wiz Owens	Released: July 29, 2024; Label: Taylor Gang; Format: Digital download	—	—	—
Kush + Orange Juice 2	Released: April 18, 2025; Label: Taylor Gang, BMG; Format: Digital download	62	19	14
Girls Love Horses	Released: February 27, 2026; Label: Taylor Gang; Format: Digital download	—	—	—
Blog Era Boyz (with MGK)	Released: May 22, 2026; Label: EST 19XX, Interscope; Format: Digital download	—	—	—

== Singles ==
=== As lead artist ===
List of singles as a lead artist, with selected chart positions and certifications, showing year released and album name
Title	Year	Peak chart positions										Certifications	Album
Title	Year	US	US R&B	US Rap	AUS	CAN	GER	IRL	NZ	SWI	UK	Certifications	Album
"Pittsburgh Sound"	2007	—	—	—	—	—	—	—	—	—	—		Show and Prove
"Youngin' on His Grind"	2007	—	—	—	—	—	—	—	—	—	—		Non-album singles
"Make It Hot"	2008	—	—	—	—	—	—	—	—	—	—		Non-album singles
"Say Yeah"	2008	— (Note: "Say Yeah" did not enter the Billboard Hot 100, but peaked at number 11 on the Bubbling Under Hot 100 Singles chart.)	— (Note: "Say Yeah" did not enter the Hot R&B/Hip-Hop Songs chart, but peaked at number 12 on the Hot R&B/Hip-Hop Songs chart.)	20	—	—	—	—	—	—	—	RIAA: Gold	Non-album singles
"Ink My Whole Body"	2009	—	—	—	—	—	—	—	—	—	—		Star Power
"Get Sum"	2009	—	—	—	—	—	—	—	—	—	—		Flight School
"Mezmorized"	2010	—	—	—	—	—	—	—	—	—	—		Kush & Orange Juice
"Black and Yellow"	2010	1	6	1	24	7	31	14	21	44	5	RIAA: 10× Platinum; ARIA: Platinum; BPI: Platinum; BVMI: Gold; MC: 3× Platinum; RMNZ: 2× Platinum	Rolling Papers
"Roll Up"	2011	13	7	2	72	56	—	49	—	—	42	RIAA: 2× Platinum; BPI: Silver; MC: Gold; RMNZ: Gold	Rolling Papers
"On My Level" (featuring Too Short)	2011	52	16	10	—	96	—	—	—	—	—	RIAA: Platinum	Rolling Papers
"No Sleep"	2011	6	—	23	—	64	91	—	—	—	—	RIAA: 2× Platinum; MC: Gold; RMNZ: Gold	Rolling Papers
"The Race"	2011	66	—	—	—	—	—	—	—	—	—		Rolling Papers
"Young, Wild & Free" (with Snoop Dogg featuring Bruno Mars)	2011	7	56	8	4	13	15	33	2	6	44	RIAA: 10× Platinum; ARIA: 4× Platinum; BPI: Platinum; BVMI: 5× Gold; IFPI SWI: Gold; MC: 3× Platinum; RMNZ: 6× Platinum	Mac & Devin Go to High School
"Work Hard, Play Hard"	2012	17	13	3	93	40	76	—	—	—	161	RIAA: 2× Platinum; MC: Gold	O.N.I.F.C.
"Remember You" (featuring the Weeknd)	2012	63	15	13	—	—	—	—	—	—	186	RIAA: Platinum	O.N.I.F.C.
"We Own It" (with 2 Chainz)	2013	16	4	3	6	14	5	21	6	3	6	RIAA: 3× Platinum; ARIA: 3× Platinum; BPI: Platinum; BVMI: 3× Gold; RMNZ: Platinum	Fast & Furious 6 (Original Motion Picture Soundtrack)
"We Dem Boyz"	2014	43	10	4	—	92	—	—	—	—	—	RIAA: Platinum; BPI: Silver; MC: Platinum; RMNZ: Gold	Blacc Hollywood
"You and Your Friends" (featuring Snoop Dogg and Ty Dolla Sign)	2014	82	21	18	—	—	—	—	—	—	—	RIAA: Platinum	Blacc Hollywood
"Shell Shocked" (with Juicy J and Ty Dolla Sign featuring Kill the Noise and Madsonik)	2014	84	26	17	96	—	—	—	—	—	—	RIAA: Platinum	Teenage Mutant Ninja Turtles Soundtrack
"See You Again" (featuring Charlie Puth)	2015	1	1	1	1	1	1	1	1	1	1	RIAA: Diamond (16× Platinum); ARIA: 5× Platinum; BPI: 4× Platinum; BVMI: Diamond; IFPI SWI: 2× Platinum; MC: 3× Platinum; RMNZ: 6× Platinum	Furious 7: Original Motion Picture Soundtrack
"Burn Slow" (featuring Rae Sremmurd)	2015	83	28	—	—	—	—	—	—	—	—		Non-album singles
"King of Everything"	2015	—	— (Note: "King of Everything" did not enter the Hot R&B/Hip-Hop Songs chart, but peaked at number two on the Hot R&B/Hip-Hop Songs chart.)	—	—	—	—	—	—	—	—	RIAA: Gold	Non-album singles
"Bake Sale" (featuring Travis Scott)	2016	56	18	9	—	71	—	—	—	—	—	RIAA: Gold	Khalifa
"All Night" (with Juicy J)	2016	—	—	—	—	—	—	—	—	—	—		TGOD Mafia Presents: Rude Awakening
"Pull Up" (featuring Lil Uzi Vert)	2016	— (Note: "Pull Up" did not enter the Billboard Hot 100, but peaked at number 20 on the Bubbling Under Hot 100 Singles chart.)	49	—	—	—	—	—	—	—	—	RIAA: Gold	Non-album single
"Sucker for Pain" (with Lil Wayne, Imagine Dragons, Logic and Ty Dolla Sign featuring X Ambassadors)	2016	15	3	1	7	19	8	84	5	16	11	RIAA: 3× Platinum; ARIA: Platinum; BPI: 2× Platinum; BVMI: Platinum; RMNZ: 3× Platinum	Suicide Squad: The Album
"Gang Up" (with Young Thug, 2 Chainz and PnB Rock)	2017	— (Note: "Gang Up" did not enter the Billboard Hot 100, but peaked at number 13 on the Bubbling Under Hot 100 Singles chart.)	— (Note: "Gang Up" did not enter the Hot R&B/Hip-Hop Songs chart, but peaked at number four on the Bubbling Under R&B/Hip-Hop Singles chart.)	—	—	—	—	—	—	72	—	RIAA: Gold	The Fate of the Furious: The Album
"Something New" (featuring Ty Dolla Sign)	2017	92	37	—	—	94	—	—	—	—	—	RIAA: Platinum; RMNZ: Platinum	Rolling Papers 2
"Letterman"	2017	—	—	—	—	—	—	—	—	—	—		Laugh Now, Fly Later
"Real Rich" (featuring Gucci Mane)	2018	— (Note: "Real Rich" did not enter the Billboard Hot 100, but peaked at number 10 on the Bubbling Under Hot 100 Singles chart.)	— (Note: "Real Rich" did not enter the Hot R&B/Hip-Hop Songs chart, but peaked at number four on the Bubbling Under R&B/Hip-Hop Singles chart.)	—	—	—	—	—	—	—	—	RIAA: Gold	Rolling Papers 2
"Hopeless Romantic" (featuring Swae Lee)	2018	72	30	25	—	83	—	—	—	—	—	RIAA: Platinum; RMNZ: Platinum	Rolling Papers 2
"Gin & Drugs" (featuring Problem)	2018	—	—	—	—	—	—	—	—	—	—		Rolling Papers 2
"Fr Fr" (featuring Lil Skies)	2018	73	31	—	—	89	—	—	—	—	—	RIAA: Gold	Rolling Papers 2
"Alright" (featuring Trippie Redd and Preme)	2019	—	—	—	—	—	—	—	—	—	—		Non-album singles
"Wait for Me" (with Carnage and G-Eazy)	2019	—	—	—	—	—	—	—	—	—	—		Non-album singles
"Never Lie" (featuring Moneybagg Yo)	2019	—	—	—	—	—	—	—	—	—	—		Non-album singles
"Speed Me Up" (with Ty Dolla Sign, Lil Yachty and Sueco the Child)	2020	—	—	—	—	—	—	—	—	—	—		Sonic the Hedgehog
"Bammer" (featuring Mustard)	2020	—	—	—	—	—	—	—	—	—	—		The Saga of Wiz Khalifa
"Contact" (featuring Tyga)	2020	—	—	—	—	—	—	—	—	—	—		The Saga of Wiz Khalifa
"Still Wiz"	2020	—	—	—	—	—	—	—	—	—	—		The Saga of Wiz Khalifa
"Drums Drums Drums" (with Travis Barker)	2020	—	—	—	—	—	—	—	—	—	—		Non-album single
"Slim Peter"	2020	—	—	—	—	—	—	—	—	—	—		Big Pimpin'
"The Thrill" (with Empire of the Sun)	2020	—	—	—	—	—	—	—	— (Note: "The Thrill" did not enter the NZ Top 40 Singles Chart, but peaked at number 35 on the NZ Hot Singles Chart.)	—	—	BPI: Gold; RMNZ: 3× Platinum	Burn After Rolling
"Cheers" (with Blackbear)	2020	—	—	—	—	—	—	—	— (Note: "Cheers" did not enter the NZ Top 40 Singles Chart, but peaked at number eight on the NZ Hot Singles Chart.)	—	—		Non-album singles
"Million Dollar Moment"	2021	—	—	—	—	—	—	—	—	—	—		Non-album singles
"Ordinary Life" (with Imanbek and Kddk featuring Kiddo)	2022	—	—	—	—	—	—	—	—	—	—		Non-album singles
"Iced Out Necklace"	2022	—	—	—	—	—	—	—	—	—	—		Multiverse
"Bad Ass Bitches"	2022	—	—	—	—	—	—	—	—	—	—		Multiverse
"#NeverDrinkingAgain"	2022	—	—	—	—	—	—	—	— (Note: "#NeverDrinkingAgain" did not enter the NZ Top 40 Singles Chart, but peaked at number 29 on the NZ Hot Singles Chart.)	—	—		Non-album singles
"Sh Sh Sh (Hit That)" (with Dvbbs featuring Urfavxboyfriend and Goldsoul)	2023	—	—	—	—	—	—	—	—	—	—		Non-album singles
"Don't Text Don't Call" (with Snoop Dogg)	2023	—	—	—	—	—	—	—	—	—	—		Non-album singles
"Khalifa's Home"	2024	—	—	—	—	—	—	—	—	—	—		Kush & Orange Juice 2
"Hide It" (featuring Don Toliver)	2024	—	—	—	—	—	—	—	— (Note: "Hide It" did not enter the NZ Top 40 Singles Chart, but peaked at number 29 on the NZ Hot Singles Chart.)	—	—		Kush & Orange Juice 2
"Bring Your Lungs" (featuring Smoke DZA)	2024	—	—	—	—	—	—	—	—	—	—		Kush & Orange Juice 2
"Hit It Once"	2024	—	—	—	—	—	—	—	—	—	—		Kush & Orange Juice 2
"Location" (with Zerb featuring Ty Dolla Sign)	2025	— (Note: "Location" did not enter the Billboard Hot 100 Chart, but peaked at number 15 on the Hot Dance/Electronic Songs.)	—	—	—	—	55	—	—	99	—		Non-album single
"Soy Así 2" (with IAmChino and Pitbull featuring Victor Cardenas)	2026	—	—	—	—	—	—	—	—	—	—		Pitcoin
"Girl Next Door" (with MGK)	2026	—	—	—	—	—	—	—	— (Note: "Girl Next Door" did not enter the NZ Top 40 Singles Chart, but peaked at number 38 on the NZ Hot Singles Chart.)	—	—		Blog Era Boyz
"Yiccen"	2026	—	—	—	—	—	—	—	—	—	—		
"—" denotes a recording that did not chart or was not released in that territory.

=== As featured artist ===
List of singles as featured artist, with selected chart positions and certifications, showing year released and album name
Title	Year	Peak chart positions										Certifications	Album
Title	Year	US	US R&B	US Rap	AUS	CAN	GER	IRL	NZ	SWI	UK	Certifications	Album
"Lowridin'" (Far East Movement featuring Wiz Khalifa and Bionik)	2007	—	—	—	—	—	—	—	—	—	—		Animal
"Best Night of My Life" (Jamie Foxx featuring Wiz Khalifa)	2011	— (Note: "Best Night of My Life" did not enter the Billboard Hot 100, but peaked at number eight on the Bubbling Under Hot 100 Singles chart.)	12	—	—	—	—	—	—	—	—		Best Night of My Life
"Till I'm Gone" (Tinie Tempah featuring Wiz Khalifa)	2011	90	49	22	—	—	—	32	—	69	24	BPI: Silver	Disc-Overy
"Oh My" (DJ Drama featuring Fabolous, Roscoe Dash and Wiz Khalifa)	2011	95	18	12	—	—	—	—	—	—	—		Third Power
"5 O'Clock" (T-Pain featuring Wiz Khalifa and Lily Allen)	2011	10	9	—	29	15	91	—	27	47	6	ARIA: Gold; BPI: Silver; MC: Platinum	Revolver
"Getting Paid" (Trae featuring Wiz Khalifa)	2011	—	—	—	—	—	—	—	—	—	—		Street King
"I'm On" (Trae featuring Lupe Fiasco, Big Boi, Wale, Wiz Khalifa and MDMA)	2011	—	—	—	—	—	—	—	—	—	—		Street King
"Till I Die" (Chris Brown featuring Big Sean and Wiz Khalifa)	2012	— (Note: "Till I Die" did not enter the Billboard Hot 100, but peaked at number one on the Bubbling Under Hot 100 Singles chart.)	12	14	—	—	—	—	—	—	—	RIAA: Gold	Fortune
"Payphone" (Maroon 5 featuring Wiz Khalifa)	2012	2	—	—	2	1	4	2	2	4	1	RIAA: 7× Platinum; ARIA: 13× Platinum; BPI: 4× Platinum; BVMI: Platinum; IFPI SWI: Platinum; RMNZ: 6× Platinum	Overexposed
"Jet Life" (Currensy featuring Big K.R.I.T. and Wiz Khalifa)	2012	—	76	—	—	—	—	—	—	—	—		The Stoned Immaculate
"Celebration" (Game featuring Chris Brown, Tyga, Wiz Khalifa and Lil Wayne)	2012	81	24	19	—	—	—	—	—	—	—	RMNZ: Gold	Jesus Piece
"Don't Make Em Like You" (Ne-Yo featuring Wiz Khalifa)	2012	—	47	—	—	—	—	—	—	—	—		R.E.D.
"Hate Bein' Sober" (Chief Keef featuring 50 Cent and Wiz Khalifa)	2013	— (Note: "Hate Bein' Sober" did not enter the Billboard Hot 100, but peaked at number nine on the Bubbling Under Hot 100 Singles chart.)	37	—	—	—	—	—	—	—	—	RIAA: 2× Platinum; RMNZ: Platinum	Finally Rich
"Molly" (Tyga featuring Cedric Gervais, Wiz Khalifa and Mally Mall)	2013	66	22	16	—	—	—	—	—	—	—	RIAA: Platinum	Hotel California
"NBA" (Joe Budden featuring Wiz Khalifa and French Montana)	2013	—	— (Note: "NBA" did not enter the Hot R&B/Hip-Hop Songs chart, but peaked at number six on the Bubbling Under R&B/Hip-Hop Singles chart.)	—	—	—	—	—	—	—	—		No Love Lost
"Beat It" (Sean Kingston featuring Chris Brown and Wiz Khalifa)	2013	52	23	—	40	—	—	63	25	—	—	ARIA: Gold; RMNZ: Platinum	Back 2 Life
"Reason to Hate" (DJ Felli Fel featuring Ne-Yo, Tyga and Wiz Khalifa)	2013	—	— (Note: "Reason to Hate" did not enter the Hot R&B/Hip-Hop Songs chart, but peaked at number eight on the Bubbling Under R&B/Hip-Hop Singles chart.)	—	—	—	—	—	—	—	—		Non-album singles
"Fighter Jet" (Caligula featuring Wiz Khalifa)	2013	—	—	—	—	—	—	—	—	—	—		Non-album singles
"Drop Bands on It" (Mally Mall featuring Wiz Khalifa, Tyga and Fresh)	2013	—	—	—	—	—	—	—	—	—	—		Non-album singles
"Irie" (Ty Dolla Sign featuring Wiz Khalifa)	2013	—	—	—	—	—	—	—	—	—	—		Beach House 2
"23" (Mike Will Made It featuring Miley Cyrus, Wiz Khalifa and Juicy J)	2013	11	4	2	39	26	—	—	22	—	85	RIAA: 4× Platinum; BVMI: Gold; RMNZ: Gold	Non-album single
"Legends in the Making (Ashtray, Pt. 2)" (Smoke DZA featuring Wiz Khalifa and Currensy)	2013	—	—	—	—	—	—	—	—	—	—		Dream.ZONE.Achieve
"Think About It" (Naughty Boy featuring Wiz Khalifa and Ella Eyre)	2013	—	—	—	—	—	—	—	—	—	78		Hotel Cabana
"Feelin' Myself" (will.i.am featuring Miley Cyrus, French Montana, Wiz Khalifa and DJ Mustard)	2013	96	26	15	34	—	55	3	16	—	2	BPI: Platinum; RMNZ: Platinum	#willpower
"Talkin' Bout" (Juicy J featuring Chris Brown and Wiz Khalifa)	2014	—	—	—	—	—	—	—	—	—	—		Stay Trippy
"Or Nah" (Ty Dolla Sign featuring Wiz Khalifa and DJ Mustard)	2014	48	12	—	—	78	—	—	—	—	—	RIAA: Diamond; BPI: 2× Platinum; RMNZ: 3× Platinum	Beach House EP
"Party Girls" (Ludacris featuring Wiz Khalifa, Jeremih and Cashmere Cat)	2014	— (Note: "Party Girls" did not enter the Billboard Hot 100, but peaked at number 13 on the Bubbling Under Hot 100 Singles chart.)	36	25	—	—	—	—	—	—	—		Non-album singles
"She Said" (Tuki Carter featuring Wiz Khalifa)	2014	—	—	—	—	—	—	—	—	—	—		Non-album singles
"Bigroom Blitz" (Scooter featuring Wiz Khalifa)	2014	—	—	—	—	—	43	—	—	—	—		The Fifth Chapter
"For Everybody" (Juicy J featuring Wiz Khalifa and R. City)	2015	—	50	—	—	—	—	—	—	—	—		Non-album single
"Hello, Hello" (Z.Tao featuring Wiz Khalifa)	2016	—	—	—	—	—	—	—	—	—	—		The Road
"Kush Ups" (Snoop Dogg featuring Wiz Khalifa)	2016	—	—	—	—	—	—	—	—	—	—		Cool Aid
"Fuck Apologies" (JoJo featuring Wiz Khalifa)	2016	—	—	—	—	—	—	—	—	—	104		Mad Love
"Influence" (Tove Lo featuring Wiz Khalifa)	2016	—	—	—	—	—	—	—	—	—	—		Lady Wood
"When I Grow Up" (Dimitri Vegas & Like Mike featuring Wiz Khalifa)	2018	—	—	—	—	—	—	—	—	—	—		Non-album single
"Solitary" (Berner and Mozzy featuring Wiz Khalifa)	2019	—	—	—	—	—	—	—	—	—	—		Slimey Individuals
"One Thought Away" (Asher Angel featuring Wiz Khalifa)	2019	—	—	—	—	—	—	—	—	—	—		Non-album single
"Sugar" (Baby Goth featuring Wiz Khalifa)	2019	—	—	—	—	—	—	—	—	—	—		Baby Goth
"Wassup" (Berner featuring Wiz Khalifa and Chevy Woods)	2019	—	—	—	—	—	—	—	—	—	—		El Chivo
"Prince Akeem" (Mike Posner featuring Wiz Khalifa)	2019	—	—	—	—	—	—	—	—	—	—		Keep Going
"Proofread" (Famous Dex featuring Wiz Khalifa)	2019	—	—	—	—	—	—	—	—	—	—		Diana
"Pack Loud" (Hitmaka featuring Wiz Khalifa, French Montana and Travis Scott)	2019	—	—	—	—	—	—	—	—	—	—		Big Tuh
"Up" (Sena Kana featuring Wiz Khalifa and Sheppard)	2019	—	—	—	—	—	—	—	—	—	—	RIAA: Gold	Non-album singles
"No Time" (Cheat Codes and DVBBS featuring Wiz Khalifa and PRINCE$$ ROSIE)	2020	—	—	—	—	—	—	—	—	—	—		Non-album singles
"Where I'm From" (Lukas Graham featuring Wiz Khalifa)	2020	—	—	—	—	—	—	—	—	—	—		Non-album singles
"One Whole Day" (Dixie D'Amelio featuring Wiz Khalifa)	2020	—	—	—	—	—	—	—	— (Note: "One Whole Day" did not enter the NZ Top 40 Singles Chart, but peaked at number eight on the NZ Hot Singles Chart.)	—	—		Non-album singles
"All the Smoke" (Tyla Yaweh featuring Gunna and Wiz Khalifa)	2020	—	—	—	—	—	—	—	— (Note: "All the Smoke" did not enter the NZ Top 40 Singles Chart, but peaked at number 38 on the NZ Hot Singles Chart.)	—	—		Non-album singles
"Too Late" (Cash Cash featuring Wiz Khalifa and Lukas Graham)	2021	—	—	—	—	—	—	—	—	—	—		Say It Like You Feel It
"Used to Be" (Steve Aoki and Kiiara featuring Wiz Khalifa)	2021	—	—	—	—	—	—	—	—	—	—		Non-album single
"Mississippi Drive" (Diss Gacha and Sala featuring Wiz Khalifa)	2024	—	—	—	—	—	—	—	—	—	—		Cultura Italiana Pt.1
“The Influencers” (Bootsy Collins featuring Fantaazma, Snoop Dogg, Dave Stewart, Westcoast Stone, Wiz Khalifa)	2024	—	—	—	—	—	—	—	—	—	—		Album of the Year #1 Funkateer
"BLUNTONOMICS"(colle$ttye featuring Wiz Khalifa)	2025	—	—	—	—	—	—	—	—	—	—		Non-album single
"That's Her" (Cyril featuring Wiz Khalifa)	2026	—	—	—	—	—	—	—	—	—	—		
"Go Home with a Stranger" (Don Diablo featuring Wiz Khalifa and Chri$tian Gate$)	2026	—	—	—	—	—	—	—	—	—	—		
"—" denotes a recording that did not chart or was not released in that territory.

=== Promotional singles ===
List of promotional singles, with selected chart positions, showing year released and album name
Title	Year	Peak chart positions				Certifications	Album
Title	Year	US	CAN	NZ Heat	SWE	Certifications	Album
"Double Vision" (Remix) (3OH!3 featuring Wiz Khalifa)	2010	—	—	—	—		Non-album singles
"Choppa Choppa Down" (Remix) (French Montana featuring Rick Ross and Wiz Khalifa)	2011	—	—	—	—		Non-album singles
"Bright Lights Bigger City" (Remix) (Cee Lo Green featuring Wiz Khalifa)	2011	—	—	—	—		Non-album singles
"Sleazy Remix 2.0: Get Sleazier" (Kesha featuring Lil Wayne, Wiz Khalifa, T.I. and André 3000)	2011	37	46	—	—		Non-album singles
"Adorn" (Remix) (Miguel featuring Wiz Khalifa)	2012	—	—	—	—		Kaleidoscope Dream
"U.O.E.N.O." (Remix) (Rocko featuring Future and Wiz Khalifa)	2013	—	—	—	—		Non-album single
"Bugatti" (Remix) (Ace Hood feat. Wiz Khalifa, T.I., Meek Mill, French Montana, 2 Chainz, Future, DJ Khaled and Birdman)	2013	—	—	—	—		Trials & Tribulations
"Like Whaaat" (Remix) (Problem featuring Wiz Khalifa, Tyga, Chris Brown and Master P)	2013	—	—	—	—		Non-album singles
"Dirty Work" (Akon featuring Wiz Khalifa)	2013	—	—	—	—		Non-album singles
"What You 'Bout" (Iamsu! featuring Wiz Khalifa and Berner)	2014	—	—	—	—		Sincerely Yours
"Promises"	2014	—	—	—	—	RIAA: Platinum	Blacc Hollywood
"Uma Thurman" (Boys of Zummer Remix) (Fall Out Boy featuring Wiz Khalifa)	2015	—	—	—	—		Non-album single
"Go Hard or Go Home" (with Iggy Azalea)	2015	86	65	—	—	RIAA: Gold	Furious 7: Original Motion Picture Soundtrack
"420" (Lil Debbie featuring Wiz Khalifa)	2015	—	—	—	—		Home Grown
"No Social Media" (featuring Snoop Dogg)	2015	—	—	—	—		Non-album single
"Most of Us"	2015	—	—	—	—		Khalifa
"Influence" (Tove Lo featuring Wiz Khalifa)	2016	—	—	5	78		Lady Wood
"Captain" (solo or Remix featuring Smokepurpp)	2018	—	—	—	—		Non-album single
"420 Freestyle"	2018	—	—	—	—		Rolling Papers 2
"Memory Lane"	2022	—	—	—	—		Multiverse
"Big Daddy Wiz" (featuring Girl Talk)	2022	—	—	—	—		Multiverse
"—" denotes a recording that did not chart or was not released in that territory.

== Other charted songs ==
List of songs, with selected chart positions and certifications, showing year released and album name
Title	Year	Peak chart positions							Certifications	Album
Title	Year	US	US R&B	US Rap	AUS	CAN	FRA	UK R&B	Certifications	Album
"Black and Purple" (Mullyman featuring Wale and Wiz Khalifa)	2010	—	98	—	—	—	—	—		WiRemix5
"When I'm Gone"	2011	57	—	—	—	88	—	—	RIAA: Platinum	Rolling Papers
"Taylor Gang" (featuring Chevy Woods)	2011	— (Note: "Taylor Gang" did not enter the Billboard Hot 100, but peaked at number 22 on the Bubbling Under Hot 100 Singles chart.)	— (Note: "Taylor Gang" did not enter the Hot R&B/Hip-Hop Songs chart, but peaked at number 18 on the Bubbling Under R&B/Hip-Hop Singles chart.)	—	—	—	—	—	RIAA: Gold	Rolling Papers
"Fly Solo"	2011	— (Note: "Fly Solo" did not enter the Billboard Hot 100, but peaked at number 24 on the Bubbling Under Hot 100 Singles chart.)	—	—	—	—	—	—		Rolling Papers
"Yoko" (Berner featuring Wiz Khalifa and Big K.R.I.T.)	2011	—	— (Note: "Yoko" did not enter the Hot R&B/Hip-Hop Songs chart, but peaked at number three on the Bubbling Under R&B/Hip-Hop Singles chart.)	—	—	—	—	—		The White Album
"High" (Big Sean featuring Wiz Khalifa and Chiddy Bang)	2011	98	—	—	—	—	—	—		Finally Famous
"Smokin' On" (with Snoop Dogg featuring Juicy J)	2011	— (Note: "Smokin' On" did not enter the Billboard Hot 100, but peaked at number 17 on the Bubbling Under Hot 100 Singles chart.)	—	—	—	—	—	—		Mac & Devin Go to High School
"Paperbond"	2012	— (Note: "Paperbond" did not enter the Billboard Hot 100, but peaked at number 22 on the Bubbling Under Hot 100 Singles chart.)	39	—	—	—	172	—		O.N.I.F.C.
"Bluffin'" (featuring Berner)	2012	—	47	—	—	—	—	—		O.N.I.F.C.
"Let It Go" (featuring Akon)	2012	87	25	21	—	91	—	—		O.N.I.F.C.
"The Bluff" (featuring Cam'ron)	2012	— (Note: "The Bluff" did not enter the Billboard Hot 100, but peaked at number five on the Bubbling Under R&B/Hip-Hop Singles chart.)	—	—	—	—	—	—		O.N.I.F.C.
"It's Nothin" (featuring 2 Chainz)	2012	— (Note: "It's Nothin" did not enter the Billboard Hot 100, but peaked at number seven on the Bubbling Under Hot 100 Singles chart.)	34	—	—	—	—	—		O.N.I.F.C.
"Initiation" (featuring LoLa Monroe)	2012	—	— (Note: "Initiation" did not enter the Hot R&B/Hip-Hop Songs chart, but peaked at number three on the Bubbling Under R&B/Hip-Hop Singles chart.)	—	—	—	—	—		O.N.I.F.C.
"Up in It"	2012	—	— (Note: "Up in It" did not enter the Hot R&B/Hip-Hop Songs chart, but peaked at number nine on the Bubbling Under R&B/Hip-Hop Singles chart.)	—	—	—	—	—		O.N.I.F.C.
"The Plan" (featuring Juicy J)	2012	—	— (Note: "The Plan" did not enter the Hot R&B/Hip-Hop Songs chart, but peaked at number four on the Bubbling Under R&B/Hip-Hop Singles chart.)	—	—	—	—	—		O.N.I.F.C.
"Medicated" (featuring Chevy Woods and Juicy J)	2012	—	44	—	—	—	—	—	RIAA: Gold	O.N.I.F.C.
"Bout Me" (featuring Problem and Iamsu!)	2012	—	— (Note: "Bout Me" did not enter the Hot R&B/Hip-Hop Songs chart, but peaked at number two on the Bubbling Under R&B/Hip-Hop Singles chart.)	—	—	—	—	—		O.N.I.F.C.
"I'm Still" (DJ Khaled featuring Chris Brown, Wale, Wiz Khalifa and Ace Hood)	2013	—	— (Note: "I'm Still" did not enter the Hot R&B/Hip-Hop Songs chart, but peaked at number four on the Bubbling Under R&B/Hip-Hop Singles chart.)	—	—	—	—	—		Suffering from Success
"True Colors" (featuring Nicki Minaj)	2014	—	— (Note: "True Colors" did not enter the Hot R&B/Hip-Hop Songs chart, but peaked at number nine on the Bubbling Under R&B/Hip-Hop Singles chart.)	—	—	93	—	29		Blacc Hollywood
"Hope" (featuring Ty Dolla Sign)	2014	—	— (Note: "Hope" did not enter the Hot R&B/Hip-Hop Songs chart, but peaked at number four on the Bubbling Under R&B/Hip-Hop Singles chart.)	—	—	—	—	—		Blacc Hollywood
"Ass Drop"	2014	— (Note: "Ass Drop" did not enter the Billboard Hot 100, but peaked at number 6 on the Bubbling Under Hot 100 Singles chart.)	35	—	—	—	—	—	RIAA: Platinum	Blacc Hollywood
"Raw"	2014	—	— (Note: "Raw" did not enter the Hot R&B/Hip-Hop Songs chart, but peaked at number nine on the Bubbling Under R&B/Hip-Hop Singles chart.)	—	—	—	—	—		Blacc Hollywood
"So High" (featuring Ghost Loft)	2014	—	—	—	—	—	—	—	RIAA: 2× Platinum; RMNZ: Gold	Blacc Hollywood
"Stayin Out All Night" (Boys of Zummer Remix) (featuring Fall Out Boy)	2015	—	—	—	93	—	—	—		Non-album single
"iSay" (featuring Juicy J)	2016	—	— (Note: "iSay" did not enter the Hot R&B/Hip-Hop Songs chart, but peaked at number two on the Bubbling Under R&B/Hip-Hop Singles chart.)	—	—	—	—	—		Khalifa
"Hot Now"	2018	— (Note: "Hot Now" did not enter the Billboard Hot 100, but peaked at number four on the Bubbling Under Hot 100 Singles chart.)	— (Note: "Hot Now" did not enter the Hot R&B/Hip-Hop Songs chart, but peaked at number one on the Bubbling Under R&B/Hip-Hop Singles chart.)	—	—	—	—	—		Rolling Papers 2
"—" denotes a recording that did not chart or was not released in that territory.

== Guest appearances ==
List of non-single guest appearances with other performing artists, showing year released and album name
Title	Year	Other artist(s)	Album
"What It Used to Be"	2006	Nicolay	Here
"How We Ride"	2009	Boaz	The Audiobiography
"Glass House"	2010	Big K.R.I.T., Currensy	K.R.I.T. Wuz Here
"I'm on It"	2010	French Montana, Nipsey Hussle, Big Sean	Mac & Cheese 2
"Super High" (Sativa Remix)	2010	Rick Ross, Ne-Yo, Currensy	none
"Scaling the Building"	2010	Ski Beatz, Currensy	24 Hour Karate School
"Look in the Mirror" (Remix)	2010	Yo Gotti, Wale, J. Cole	none
"In My Car (Puff Bus)"	2010	J-Green, Juicy J	Solo Tape
"I Know"	2010	Diddy – Dirty Money, Chris Brown, Sevyn	Last Train to Paris
"Retrosuperfuture"	2010	Rick Ross	Ashes to Ashes
"Black and Purple"	2010	Mullyman, Wale	WiRemix5
"Taylor Made"	2011	Game	Purp & Patron
"Purp & Yellow" (Skeetox Remix)	2011	Game, Snoop Dogg	Purp & Patron
"Keep Floatin'"	2011	Mac Miller	Best Day Ever
"Bomb"	2011	Chris Brown	F.A.M.E.
"This Weed Iz Mine"	2011	Snoop Dogg	Doggumentary
"Racks" (Remix)	2011	YC, Young Jeezy, Cyhi the Prynce, Bun B, B.o.B, Yo Gotti, Wale, Cory Gunz, Ace Hood, Trae tha Truth, Nelly, Twista, Big Sean, Cory Mo, Waka Flocka Flame	none
"Can You Feel It"	2011	Sublime with Rome	Yours Truly
"High"	2011	Big Sean, Chiddy Bang	Finally Famous
"Yoko"	2011	Berner, Big K.R.I.T., Chris Brown	The White Album
"Standin' on a Corner"	2011	Game, B.o.B	Hoodmorning (notypo): Candy Coronas
"Scanners"	2011	Neako	The Number 23
"Stoners Night (Part II)"	2011	Juicy J	Blue Dream & Lean
"Do It Again"	2011	Terrace Martin, Kendrick Lamar	Locke High 2
"Smoke with Me"	2011	Terrace Martin, Problem, James Fauntleroy	Locke High 2
"Go Girl"	2012	Yo Gotti, Big K.R.I.T., Big Sean, Wale	Live from the Kitchen
"Flatline"	2012	Masspike Miles	Say Hello to Forever
"No Squares"	2012	Currensy	The Stoned Immaculate
"Vice"	2012	Chevy Woods, Juicy J	Gang Land
"Shine"	2012	Chevy Woods, LoLa Monroe	Gang Land
"M'Fer"	2012	Chevy Woods	Gang Land
"Homerun"	2012	Chevy Woods	Gang Land
"I Be Puttin' On"	2012	Wale, French Montana, Roscoe Dash	Self Made Vol. 2
"Co-Pilot"	2012	Prodigy	H.N.I.C. 3
"I'm So Blessed"	2012	DJ Khaled, Big Sean, Ace Hood, T-Pain	Kiss the Ring
"No Limit"	2012	Planet VI, Ariez Onasis	The American Nightmare
"All I Know"	2012	Big Sean	Detroit
"Gettin' After That Money"	2012	Boaz	Bases Loaded
"Pledge of Allegiance"	2012	DJ Drama, Planet VI, B.o.B	Quality Street Music
"The Plug"	2012	Berner	Urban Farmer
"Like Mine"	2012	Berner, LoLa Monroe	Urban Farmer
"Forever a G"	2012	Xzibit	Napalm
"Enjoy the Night"	2012	Xzibit, David Banner, Brevi	Napalm
"I Go Hard"	2012	Ghostface Killah, Boy Jones	The Man with the Iron Fists soundtrack
"Like the Pack"	2012	Tuki Carter	Atlantafornication
"Pimpin' Ain't"	2012	Tuki Carter	Atlantafornication
"Holdup Rollup"	2012	Tuki Carter, Chevy Woods	Atlantafornication
"Say I"	2012	E-40, Too Short	History: Function Music
"Drank and Smoke"	2012	Gudda Gudda	Guddaville 3
"Know Betta"	2012	Juicy J	none
"Bandz a Make Her Dance" (Remix)	2012	Juicy J, B.o.B, Lola Monroe, French Montana	none
"Goin' Up"	2012	Iamsu!	Suzy 6 Speed
"Ain't No Change"	2012	Compton Menace	Menace 2 Society Vol. 2
"Fuck Shit"	2012	Compton Menace	Menace 2 Society Vol. 2
"Die Young" (Remix)	2012	Kesha, Juicy J, Becky G	Warrior
"Medicine Man (Drug Free)"	2012	Fashawn	Moet: Champagne & Styrofoam Cups
"Hate Bein' Sober"	2012	Chief Keef, 50 Cent	Finally Rich
"In the Night"	2012	The Madden Brothers, Detail	Before — Volume One
"Paradise"	2012	Berner	none
"In the Stars"	2013	Juicy J	none
"Still Got That Work"	2013	Project Pat	Cheez N Dope
"Million Dollars"	2013	Kid Red	REDemption
"Started From the Bottom (Remix)"	2013	Drake	none
"Everything Is Good"	2013	Juelz Santana	God Will'n
"Playin'"	2013	YG, Young Jeezy	Just Re'd Up 2
"Choosin'"	2013	Currensy, Rick Ross	New Jet City
"Molly Girl" (Remix)	2013	Lil Durk	none
"Nothin' on Ya"	2013	Gucci Mane	Trap God 2
"Ain't No Changing Me" (Remix)	2013	Compton Menace, Game	none
"Ballin'"	2013	Fat Joe, Teyana Taylor	none
"M.O.E."	2013	Tyga	Hotel California
"Paradise"	2013	Cassie	RockaByeBaby
"Only One"	2013	Big K.R.I.T., Smoke DZA	K.R.I.T. (King Remembered In Time)
"Burn Slow"	2013	Los, Mickey Shiloh	Becoming King
"Weak"	2013	Los, Cassie	Becoming King
"She Said"	2013	Tuki Carter	none
"The Rockers"	2013	Action Bronson	Saaab Stories
"Gone"	2013	Kelly Rowland	Talk a Good Game
"Rotation"	2013	Wale, 2 Chainz	The Gifted
"Kush Do" (Remix)	2013	Rockie Fresh	none
"Bout Mine"	2013	Problem	The Separation
"Like Whaaat" (Remix)	2013	Problem, Chris Brown, Tyga, Master P	none
"See Me"	2013	Tech N9ne, B.o.B.	Something Else
"Mind of a Stoner"	2013	Machine Gun Kelly	Black Flag
"I Bet"	2013	Ty Dolla Sign	Beach House 2
"Satellites" (Remix)	2013	Kevin Gates	Stranger Than Fiction
"Shootin'"	2013	Juicy J	none
"I'm Laughin'"	2013	Cory Gunz	Datz WTF I'm Talkin Bout
"Bands on It"	2013	Mally Mall, Tyga, Fresh	none
"Smoke a Nigga"	2013	Juicy J	Stay Trippy
"Talkin' Bout"	2013	Juicy J, Chris Brown	Stay Trippy
"One Thousand"	2013	Juicy J	Stay Trippy
"Motivation"	2013	Terrace Martin, Brevi	3ChordFold
"Dimes"	2013	Vali	none
"Chiefin'"	2013	Project Pat	Cheez N Dope 2
"Miley"	2013	DJ Holiday, Waka Flocka Flame	none
"My Chick Better"	2013	Nelly, Fabolous	M.O.
"Rider"	2013	Chief Keef	none
"Like Me"	2013	Grafh	Pain Killers: Reloaded
"1 Up"	2013	Trae tha Truth, Lil Boss, Jadakiss	I Am King
"I'm Still"	2013	DJ Khaled, Ace Hood, Chris Brown, Wale	Suffering from Success
"Cash in a Rubberband"	2013	DJ Bay Bay, Juicy J, Project Pat	Bay Bay Day 2013
"KD35"	2013	Chevy Woods	Gang Land 2
"More Champagne"	2013	DJ Whoo Kid, ASAP Ferg, Problem	The N-Word Bond Project
"Advice"	2013	Berner	Drugstore Cowboy
"Night & Day"	2013	Berner, Problem	Drugstore Cowboy
"Bounce It" (Remix)	2013	Juicy J, Trey Songz	none
"La La La"	2013	Dorrough	none
"The Vapors" (Remix)	2013	Jhené Aiko	none
"Whippin' a Brick"	2013	Mike Will Made It, Migos	#MikeWillBeenTrill
"All for You"	2014	French Montana, Lana Del Rey, Snoop Dogg, Machine Gun Kelly	Coke Boys 4
"High as Hell"	2014	B.o.B	none
"Hydroponic"	2014	Kurupt, B-Real	Wake & Bake Vol. 1
"My Momma"	2014	Future	Honest
"Too Wild"	2014	Afrojack, Devin Cruise	Forget the World
"Deep"	2014	DJ Mustard, Rick Ross, TeeFlii	10 Summers
"Burnin"	2014	Twista, Berner	Dark Horse
"All Day"	2014	John Cena	WWE 2K15 soundtrack
"Breaks"	2014	John Cena	WWE 2K15 soundtrack
"Let's Get It"	2014	Cash Out, Ty Dolla $ign	Let's Get It
"Touch The Sky"	2014	Cam'ron, Smoke DZA	1st of the Month Vol. 5
"Nights Like this"	2015	OG Maco	none
"Backflip" (Remix)	2015	Casey Veggies, Iamsu!, ASAP Ferg	none
"Somebody Else" (Remix)	2015	Rico Love, Usher	none
"Whole Thang"	2015	Juicy J	Blue Dream & Lean 2
"Livin Right"	2015	Lil Wayne	Free Weezy Album
"Scrape It"	2015	Juicy J, Project pat	100% Juice
"Do It for the Gang"	2015	Krept and Konan	The Long Way Home
"Im Out Here"	2015	O.T. Genesis	R&B Rhythm Bricks
"Material Things"	2015	Lyrica Anderson	Hello
"All or Nothing	2015	Puff Daddy, French Montana	MMM
"Counterfeit"	2015	Chris Brown, Rihanna, Kelly Rowland	Before the Party
"So High"	2015	Jadakiss	Top 5 Dead or Alive
"Sitting Pretty"	2015	Ty Dolla $ign	Free TC
"Oh Na Na"	2016	Snoop Dogg	Coolaid
"Forgive Me Father"	2016	DJ Khaled, Meghan Trainor, Wale	Major Key
"Way Hii"	2016	A$AP Mob, A$AP Rocky, BJ The Chicago Kid, Buddy	Cozy Tapes Vol. 1: Friends
"Talk That Talk"	2016	Juicy J, Project Pat	MustBeNice
"Best Thang Smokin"	2016	Berner, Snoop Dogg, B Real	Hempire
"Seal"	2016	Berner, K Camp	Hempire
"All We Do"	2016	Berner, Juicy J	Hempire
"Still Rich"	2016	Berner, Lil Kim	Hempire
"Attention"	2017	PnB Rock	GTTM: Goin Thru the Motions
"Stare"	2017	Ty Dolla $ign, Pharrell	Beach House 3
"Gang Up"	2017	Young Thug, 2 Chainz, PnB Rock	The Fate of the Furious: The Album
"Phone Jumpin"	2017	Dave East	Paranoia: A True Story
"No Lies"	2017	Ugly God	The Booty Tape
"Too Many"	2017	Juicy J, Denzel Curry	Rubba Band Business
"Test Drive"	2017	Riff Raff	Aquaberry Aquarius
"Ridin' Out"	2017	AD, RJ	Blue 89 C2
"Always High"	2017	Juicy J	Highly Intoxicated
"Flowers and Planes (Flight TGOD)"	2017	Tuki Carter, Chevy Woods	Flowers and Planes
"Hollywood"	2017	Tuki Carter, Juicy J	Flowers and Planes
"Heron"	2017	Berner, Young Dolph	Tracking Numbers EP
"On The River"	2017	Young Dolph	Gelato
"Long Night"	2018	Riff Raff, Gary Clark, Jr., Mozzy	Cool Blue Jewels
"Indica Badu"	2018	Logic	Bobby Tarantino II
"Got Em Like"	2018	Juicy J, Lil Peep	Shutdafukup
"Breathe"	2018	Trick-Trick, Diezel	SmokeGang
"The Count"	2018	Curren$y, Harry Fraud	The Marina
"Last Year"	2018	Berner, Trey Songz	The Big Pescado
"B*tch You Lyin"	2018	Chevy Woods	81
"Hillside"	2018	Tory Lanez, Mansa	Memories Don't Die
"What's The Play"	2018	none	The Uncle Drew Motion Picture Soundtrack
"Dope Dealer"	2018	King Los	The 410 Survival Kit
"Take Her"	2018	Famous Dex	Dex Meets Dexter
"God Wanted Us To Be Lit"	2018	Red Cafe, French Montana	Less Talk More Hustle
"Gucci On Yo Booty"	2018	YFN Lucci, Yung Bleu	LUCCI VANDROSS
"OMG"	2018	Iggy Azalea	Survive the Summer
"Trippin"	2018	DP Beats, Travis Scott	DPONTHEBEAT Vol.3
"Hardly Ever Home"	2018	DP Beats	DPONTHEBEAT Vol.3
"All I Do Is Splash"	2018	DP Beats, Sosamann	DPONTHEBEAT Vol.3
"In Pocket"	2018	Berner, Yung T.O.& Chevy Woods	Rico
"Brown Bag"	2018	Berner	Rico
"Miss Me"	2018	Berner, Styles P	Rico
"Player Way"	2018	Warm Brew	New Content
"Clouds"	2018	K Camp	Rare Sound
"Surrounded"	2018	Ty Dolla Sign, Jeremih, Chris Brown	MihTy
"Feelin"	2018	Berner	11/11
"Brrrr"	2018	Berner	11/11
"Pack"	2018	Berner	11/11
"Right There"	2018	Chevy Woods	Lewis Park Legend
"Ducc Sauce"	2018	Chevy Woods	Lewis Park Legend
"Fitness"	2018	24hrs	B4 Xmas
"KhalifAndretti"	2018	Curren$y	Weed & Instrumentals 3
"Ride or Die"	2019	Sosamann	Sauce Eskobar 2
"Solitary"	2019	Berner, Mozzy	Slimey Individualz
"4/20"	2019	Jim Jones, Curren$y	El Capo
"Wassup"	2019	Berner, Chevy Woods	El Chivo
"Do What We Want"	2019	Berner	El Chivo
"Still Ballin'"	2019	Logic	Confessions of a Dangerous Mind
"Empty Bottles"	2019	Chevy Woods	New 90's
"No Love Songs"	2019	Chevy Woods	New 90's
"Karl Kani"	2019	Chevy Woods	New 90's
"Nothin New"	2019	Curren$y, Statik Selektah, Haile Supreme	Grand Turismo
"Lame"	2019	Gucci Mane, Rick Ross	Delusions of Grandeur
"Big Deal"	2019	E-40, P-Lo	Practice Makes Paper
"Take Me Away"	2019	Snoop Dogg, Russ	I Wanna Thank Me
"La Plaza"	2019	Berner, Snoop Dogg	La Plaza
"Every Night"	2019	Berner, Chris Brown	La Plaza
"911"	2019	24hrs	World on Fire
"Iced Up"	2019	Hoodrich Pablo Juan, Gucci Mane	Dope Money Violence
"Me" (Remix)	2019	Chevy Woods	none
"Bad Boy"	2020	Yung Bae, Bbno$, MAX	none
"Don't Worry"	2020	Playboi Carti	none
"Alive"	2020	Chevy Woods	Since Birth
"All the Smoke"	2020	Tyla Yaweh, Gunna	Rager Boy
"How We Do It:	2020	Shoreline Mafia	Mafia Bidness
"90'IROC-Z"	2020	Curren$y, Harry Fraud	The OutRunners
"While Driving"	2020	Berner, B-Real	Los Meros
"So Simple"	2020	Berner	Russ Bfalino: The Quiet Don
"Everything"	2020	Berner	Russ Bfalino: The Quiet Don
"Proofread"	2020	Famous Dex	Diana
"Aww Man"	2020	MadeinTYO	Never Forgotten
"Excite Me"	2021	Lil Skies	Unbothered
"Rich Friends"	2021	Fendy P	The Art Of Finessing 2
"Everything New"	2021	DJ Pharris, Chance the Rapper, Rockie Fresh	none
"Paper Cuts"	2021	Casey Veggies	Cg5
"Hella Smoke"	2021	Rick Ross	Richer Than I Ever Been
"Corvette Rally Stripes"	2022	Curren$y, The Alchemist, Havoc	Continuance
"What Happened To The World?"	2023	Larry June, The Alchemist	The Great Escape
"Higher Than Heaven"	2024	Jelly Roll	Beautifully Broken
"Diamonds Lights Fast Cars"	2024	Kid Cudi	Insano (Nitro Mega)
"Just the Way It Iz"	2025	Snoop Dogg, J-Black	Iz It a Crime?
"Until Night Comes"	2025	Larry June, Cardo, Richie Rich	Until Night Comes
"Lemonade"	2025	DDG	Blame The Chat

== Music videos ==
=== As lead artist ===
List of music videos as lead artist, with directors, showing year released
Title	Year	Director(s)
"Youngin' on His Grind"	2007	Bunchluv
"Pittsburgh Sound"	2007	Bunchluv
"Say Yeah"	2008	Ara Soudjian
"This Plane"	2009	Bunch
"Black and Yellow"	2010	Bill Paladino
"In the Cut"	2010	Bill Paladino
"Mezmorized"	2010	Bill Paladino
"Roll Up"	2011	Jake Davis
"On My Level" (featuring Too Short)	2011	Jake Davis
"No Sleep"	2011	Colin Tilley
"Taylor Gang"	2011	Bill Paladino
"Black and Yellow" (Remix) (featuring Snoop Dogg, Juicy J and T-Pain)	2011	Motion Family
"Young, Wild & Free" (with Snoop Dogg featuring Bruno Mars)	2011	Dylan Brown
"Dessert"	2011	Bill Paladino
"California"	2011	Bill Paladino
"Work Hard, Play Hard"	2012	Bill Paladino
"It's Nothin'" (featuring 2 Chainz)	2012	Bill Paladino
"STU"	2012	Greg Neiser
"Tweak Is Heavy"	2012	Greg Neiser
"Remember You" (featuring The Weeknd)	2012	Ryan Hope
"The Bluff" (featuring Cam'ron)	2012	Bill Paladino
"100 Bottles"	2013	Greg Neiser
"Let It Go" (featuring Akon)	2013	Ryan Hope
"Bout Me" (featuring Problem and Iamsu!)	2013	Frank Paladino
"Paperbond"	2013	Frank Paladino
"Old Chanel" (featuring Smoke DZA)	2013	Slick Jackson
"The Plan" (featuring Juicy J)	2013	Frank Paladino, Alex Di Marco
"OG Bobby Johnson Remix" (featuring Chevy Woods)	2014	David Camarena
"We Dem Boyz"	2014	Ethan Lader
"MAAN! Weedmix"	2014	David Camarena
"KK" (featuring Project Pat and Juicy J)	2014	Frank Paladino
"Promises"	2014	Gerard Victor
"Stayin Out All Night"	2014	Director X
"You and Your Friends" (featuring Snoop Dogg and Ty Dolla $ign)	2014	Kurt Nishimura
"Hope (Young Icon)"	2014	Wiz Khalifa
"Raw"	2015	Alexi
"Still Down" (featuring Ty Dolla $ign and Chevy Woods)	2015	Gerard Victor
"Decisions"	2015	Dan Folger and Frank U
"The Sleaze"	2015	David Camarena
"See You Again"	2015	Marc Klasfeld
"Good For Us"	2015	Dan Folger
"Real Rich" (featuring Gucci Mane)	2017	Cole Bennett
"Something New" (featuring Ty Dolla $ign)	2017	Bryan Barber
"The Life" (with Curren$y)	2019	CBFOUR.CO

=== As featured artist ===
List of music videos as featured performer, with directors, showing year released
Title	Year	Director(s)
"Oh My" (DJ Drama featuring Fabolous, Roscoe Dash and Wiz Khalifa)	2011	Derek Pike
"Choppa Choppa Down" (Remix) (French Montana featuring Rick Ross and Wiz Khalifa)	2011	Morocco Vaughn
"Bright Lights Bigger City" (Remix) (Cee Lo Green featuring Wiz Khalifa)	2011	Kai Regan
"Till I'm Gone" (Tinie Tempah featuring Wiz Khalifa)	2011	Dori Oskowitz
"Yoko" (Berner featuring Wiz Khalifa, Chris Brown and Big K.R.I.T.)	2011	Tha Razor, Godfrey Tabarez
"5 O'Clock" (T-Pain featuring Wiz Khalifa and Lily Allen)	2011	T-Pain, Erik White
"Do It Again" (Terrace Martin featuring Wiz Khalifa and Kendrick Lamar)	2011	Fredo Tovar, Scott Fleishman
"I'm On" (Trae featuring Lupe Fiasco, Big Boi, Wale, Wiz Khalifa and MDMA)	2012	Philly Fly Boy
"Payphone" (Maroon 5 featuring Wiz Khalifa)	2012	Samuel Bayer
"Till I Die" (Chris Brown featuring Big Sean and Wiz Khalifa)	2012	Chris Brown
"Celebration" (Game featuring Chris Brown, Tyga, Wiz Khalifa and Lil Wayne)	2012	Matt Alonzo
"Jet Life" (Currensy featuring Big K.R.I.T. and Wiz Khalifa)	2012	Alex Nazari
"Say I" (E-40 and Too Short featuring Wiz Khalifa)	2012	Ben Griffin
"Everything Is Good" (Juelz Santana featuring Wiz Khalifa and Bucksy Luciano)	2013	Propa TV
"M'fer" (Chevy Woods featuring Wiz Khalifa)	2013	Edge Media
"NBA" (Joe Budden featuring Wiz Khalifa and French Montana)	2013	Eif Rivera
"Nothin' on Ya" (Gucci Mane featuring Wiz Khalifa)	2013	Gabriel Hart
"Molly" (Tyga featuring Wiz Khalifa, Mally Mall and Cedric Gervais)	2013	Colin Tilley
"Paradise" (Cassie featuring Wiz Khalifa)	2013	Alex Nazari
"Beat It" (Sean Kingston featuring Chris Brown and Wiz Khalifa)	2013	Colin Tilley
"Paradise" (Berner featuring Wiz Khalifa)	2013	Tha Razor
"Goin' Up" (Iamsu! featuring Wiz Khalifa)	2013	Kreayshawn
"Ballin'" (Fat Joe featuring Wiz Khalifa and Teyana Taylor)	2013	Eif Rivera
"Flatline" (Masspike Miles featuring Wiz Khalifa)	2013	J.R. Saint
"Ain't No Changing Me" (Compton Menace featuring Wiz Khalifa)	2013	Tha Razor
"Reason to Hate" (DJ Felli Fel featuring Ne-Yo, Tyga and Wiz Khalifa)	2013	Matt Alonzo, Kai Henry
"Fighter Jet" (Caligula featuring Wiz Khalifa)	2013	Brazil
"Drop Bands on It" (Mally Mall featuring Wiz Khalifa, Tyga and Fresh)	2013	Mike Ho
"Dimes" (Vali featuring Wiz Khalifa)	2013	Paul Coy Allen
"23" (Mike Will Made It featuring Miley Cyrus, Juicy J and Wiz Khalifa)	2013	Hannah Lux Davis
"Gettin' After That Money" (Boaz featuring Wiz Khalifa)	2013	Matt Meehan
"Think About It" (Naughty Boy featuring Wiz Khalifa and Ella Eyre)	2013	Lance Drake
"More Champagne" (DJ Whoo Kid featuring Wiz Khalifa, ASAP Ferg and Problem)	2013	Dan the Man
"Feelin' Myself" (will.i.am featuring Miley Cyrus, French Montana, Wiz Khalifa and DJ Mustard)	2013	Michael Jurkovac, Pasha Shapiro
"Talkin' Bout" (Juicy J featuring Chris Brown and Wiz Khalifa)	2014	Benny Boom
"Bigroom Blitz" (Scooter featuring Wiz Khalifa)	2014	Paul Gerwien
"Hello, Hello" (ZTAO featuring Wiz Khalifa)	2016	Ethan Lader
"One Whole Day" (Dixie D'Amelio featuring Wiz Khalifa)	2020	Jake the Shooter

=== Cameo appearances ===
Title	Year	Artist	Director
"Where's the Love?"	2016	Black Eyed Peas	Michael Jurkovac
"Sorry Not Sorry"	2017	Demi Lovato	Hannah Lux Davis
