= No Sleep (Wiz Khalifa song) =

Single by Wiz Khalifa

from the album Rolling Papers
- Released: August 9, 2011
- Genre: Hip hop; alternative hip hop; pop rap
- Length: 3:11
- Label: Rostrum; Atlantic
- Songwriters: Cameron Thomaz; Benjamin Levin
- Producers: Benny Blanco; Big Jerm

Wiz Khalifa singles chronology
"The Race" (2011)	"No Sleep" (2011)	"5 O'Clock" (2011)

"No Sleep" is a song by American rapper Wiz Khalifa, released as the fifth official single from his debut major-label studio album, Rolling Papers. The track features production from Benny Blanco and Big Jerm, and was written by the former alongside Khalifa. The song was released as a single on August 9, 2011. The song debuted, and peaked at number six on the Billboard Hot 100, becoming Wiz Khalifa's third-highest charting song as a solo artist behind "Black and Yellow" and "See You Again". It is about the rapper's all-night party.

== Track listing ==
- Digital download
1. "No Sleep" – 3:11

== Music video ==
A music video for "No Sleep" was released on August 12, 2011. The video was directed by Colin Tilley and features cameo appearances by fellow Pittsburgh-rapper Mac Miller, Wiz Khalifa's Taylor Gang mate Chevy Woods, and his ex-girlfriend, video model Amber Rose.

== Charts ==
"No Sleep" debuted at number six on April 9, 2011 on the Billboard Hot 100. It re-entered the Hot 100 on August 27, 2011 at number 98 following the music video's and the single's release, and since reached number 70.

Chart (2011)	Peak position
Canada Hot 100 (Billboard)	64
Czech Republic Airplay (ČNS IFPI)	76
France (SNEP)	80
US Billboard Hot 100	6
US Pop Songs (Billboard)	36
US Rhythmic Airplay (Billboard)	21

=== Certifications ===
Region	Certification	Certified units/sales
Canada (Music Canada)	Gold	40,000^{*}
United States (RIAA)	2× Platinum	2,000,000^{‡}
^{*} Sales figures based on certification alone.^{‡} Sales+streaming figures based on certification alone.

== Release history ==
Country	Date	Format	Label
United States	March 22, 2011	Digital download	Atlantic Records
United Kingdom	September 19, 2011	Digital download	Atlantic Records
