= Rolling Papers (album) =

Studio album by Wiz Khalifa
- Released: March 29, 2011
- Studios: Downtown Recording Studios; Lotzah Matzah Studios; Roc The Mic Studios (New York, New York); I.D. Labs (Pittsburgh, Pennsylvania); The Treehouse (Los Angeles, California); Circle House Recording Studios (Miami, Florida)
- Genre: Pop-rap
- Length: 57:51
- Labels: Rostrum; Taylor Gang; Atlantic
- Producers: Stargate; Jim Jonsin; Benny Blanco; Eric Dan; Big Jerm; Pop & Oak; Brandon Carrier; Bei Maejor; H. Amarr; Lex Luger

Wiz Khalifa chronology
Cabin Fever (2011)	Rolling Papers (2011)	Mac & Devin Go to High School (2011)

Singles from Rolling Papers
- 1. "Black and Yellow" Released: September 14, 2010; 2. "Roll Up" Released: February 3, 2011; 3. "On My Level" Released: February 22, 2011; 4. "The Race" Released: March 8, 2011; 5. "No Sleep" Released: March 22, 2011

Rolling Papers is the third studio album by American rapper Wiz Khalifa. It was released on March 29, 2011, by Atlantic Records, Taylor Gang Entertainment and Rostrum Records. It is his first album under a major label after his independent releases, Show and Prove (2006) and Deal or No Deal (2009). The album features guest appearances from Too Short, Currensy and Chevy Woods. Rolling Papers was supported by five singles: "Black and Yellow", "Roll Up", "On My Level", "No Sleep", and "The Race". The album has been noted by music writers for having a pop rap style.

Rolling Papers debuted at number two on the Billboard 200, with first-week sales of 197,000 copies in the United States. The album has been certified double platinum by the Recording Industry Association of America (RIAA), for combined sales and album-equivalent units of two million units. Upon its release, the album received generally mixed reviews from music critics, who complimented its mood, atmosphere, and hooks, but criticized its subject matter.

A follow-up, Rolling Papers 2, was released on July 13, 2018.

== Background ==
Following the release of his independent second album, Deal Or No Deal in 2009, Wiz Khalifa released his mixtape Kush & Orange Juice, which immediately became widely praised as one of the best hip hop mixtapes of 2010. After generating buzz from the mixtape, Khalifa not only won MTV's "Hottest Breakthrough Hip Hop Artist of 2010" award, but he also became the center of a bidding war between various labels, including Rick Ross' Maybach Music Group label. He also came to the attention of fellow rapper Drake, who offered him the chance to co-headline his album tour. After declining both rapper's offers, he announced that he was signing with Atlantic Records live on July 30 on MTV's "RapFix 34 Live," and confirmed that he had begun work on his debut on the label. His first official single, "Black and Yellow", produced by Stargate, became one of the highest selling hip hop singles of 2010, eventually selling over two million digital downloads.

=== Title significance ===
On January 26, 2011, Khalifa announced the album's title and release date via Ustream.tv. According to Khalifa, there are three different meanings behind the Rolling Papers title.

It’s an appropriate title. It’s called Rolling Papers, like the papers that you roll, the papers that I roll, the papers that we smoke. But it’s deeper than that too. I thought of this before I even started recording the album and before it was a full idea. It’s not just about the weed thing. It’s bigger than that. My career really took off when I started smoking papers.

The second reason I called it Rolling Papers is when I left Warner Bros., I sort of got my ‘rolling papers.’ I got my contract, fucking rolled up, and smoked. And I was able to walk and I was able to leave and I was able to do my thing and I was able to capitalize off that. So that’s another pair of papers that I really needed in my life and days.

The third reason why I named it Rolling Papers, I quit writing a long time ago. I stopped physically writing it down or putting it in my BlackBerry or iPhone. I write notes down, but I don’t write whole verses, so it was like saying goodbye to the paper. The paper’s rolling out too. So everything is real natural. The first thing that came to my head is how I really, really feel. I feel like this is my most natural sound. I paid the most attention to this shit when I did it. I was real focused. I was real keyed in on this shit when I was working on it and I didn’t use any paper, except for [the rolling papers].

== Guests ==
Khalifa had confirmed that rappers; Currensy, Rick Ross, Too Short, and Snoop Dogg would appear on the album in late January 2011. In 2010, Khalifa had also toured and been in the studio with fellow rapper Yelawolf making their appearance on the album a possibility. He also confirmed via Twitter, that he had been in the studio and finished two tracks with rapper, Game, one of which will appear on Khalifa's album. Fellow Pittsburgh and Rostrum Records labelmate rapper, Mac Miller, has also confirmed working with Khalifa for the album in the studio. Upon the album's release, the only guest appearances on the album were from Too Short, Currensy and Chevy Woods. He also expressed a desire to get "veteran rappers" featured on the album such as 8Ball & MJG, Devin the Dude and Cam'ron, this last one being a personal friend and influence to Khalifa, although none of them made an appearance on the album.

== Release and promotion ==
On April 14, 2010, Khalifa released his eighth mixtape, Kush & Orange Juice. The following year, on February 18, 2011, Khalifa released another mixtape, Cabin Fever, in promotion for the album. Rolling Papers was released on March 29, 2011 by Atlantic Records and Rostrum Records, making it his first release on a major label.

=== Singles ===
"Black and Yellow" was released as the album's lead single on September 14, 2010. The song was written in honor of Khalifa's hometown city of Pittsburgh, Pennsylvania's sporting team's colors (and the primary colors on the city's flag), and became the unofficial anthem of the Pittsburgh Steelers. The single topped the US Billboard Hot 100 and became one of the highest selling Hip-Hop songs of 2010, obtaining massive radio air-play and tallying sales of 2,342,000 in the United States. It also reached the top ten in Canada and the United Kingdom and reached the top forty in many other countries. The song is also known for its various remixes by other fellow rappers including Lil Wayne, Tyga, Slim Thug, Young Jeezy, Wale, Donnis, Game, SoLouCity YG, Kendrick Lamar, Jim Jones and Maino. The official remix, "Black and Yellow (G-Mix)" would later be released in February, and feature Snoop Dogg, Juicy J and T-Pain.

"Roll Up" was released as the album's second single on February 3, 2011. It peaked at number 13 on the US Hot 100, number 7 on the US R&B charts, and number 2 on US Rap charts. It achieved moderate success in international markets, where it reached the top 50 on the UK singles chart.

"On My Level", featuring Too Short, was released as the album's third single via digital download on February 22, 2011 was later sent to radio in North America on May 28, 2011. It peaked at number 52 on the Billboard Hot 100.

"The Race" was released as the album's fourth single (although not sent to radio) on March 8, 2011, and peaked at number 66 on the US Hot 100.

"No Sleep" was released as the album's fifth and final single on March 22, 2011. It became the second highest performing song from the album, as it peaked at number 6 on the US Billboard Hot 100. The song was later sent to radio on August 9, 2011. It has also debuted at number 38 on the Billboard Pop Songs chart.

== Critical reception ==
Professional ratings
Aggregate scores
Source	Rating
Metacritic	59/100
Review scores
Source	Rating
AllMusic	3.5/5 stars
The A.V. Club	C
Entertainment Weekly	B+
NME	5/10
Now	3/5
Pitchfork Media	7.2/10
PopMatters	2/10
Rolling Stone	3/5 stars
Slant Magazine	2.5/5 stars
Spin	6/10

Rolling Papers received generally mixed to positive reviews from music critics. At Metacritic, which assigns a normalized rating out of 100 to reviews from mainstream critics, the album received an average score of 59, based on 24 reviews. Many critics disparaged Khalifa's lyricism as either uninspired or uncharismatic. Brandon Soderberg of Spin wrote that it "embraces the doggedly one-note approach of the numerous mixtapes that built his substantial following". Slant Magazine's Matthew Cole found Khalifa's lyrics "boring" and stated, "he seems to regress to the tepid sing-song rapping that the music demands". Sputnikmusic's Sobhi Abdul-Rakhman panned it as "overproduced, generic Disney Channel beats by names no one knows, derivative choruses and melodies that obviously sound manufactured by a tie-wielding Atlantic executive, and lyricism that fails at even being anthemic for parties". Jesse Serwer of The Village Voice criticized the tracks with "beats even more pop than 'Black & Yellow'", adding that "Wiz has grown into a more skillful hookmeister than rapper".

Hamish MacBain of NME stated, "Six songs in [...] the start of 'Rolling Paper''s descent into eight loooong, dull filler tracks that, musically and lyrically, are completely indistinguishable from one to the other". Kevin Ritchie of Now wrote similarly, "Around the midpoint, his preoccupation with 'bitches and champagne' (and weed) starts to wear thin as he leans harder on pop choruses, resulting in forced and cutesy-sounding tracks". David Amidon of PopMatters observed "lyrical laziness". Lev Harris of The Quietus called the album "a rap autopilot that engages all too often [...] revert[s] back to the pop rap blueprint as drawn by Dre and Snoop Dogg", noting its lyrical content as too "preoccup[ied] with weed". The A.V. Club's Nathan Rabin called it "monomaniacal, largely undistinguished" and commented that "unlike Snoop, Khalifa never seems to be having much fun".

In a positive review, AllMusic editor David Jeffries complimented Khalifa's "keen sense of melody and fat sack of hooks" and stated "Khalifa's chilled and confused Rolling Papers is an acquired taste [...] purposeful mood music, perfect for bong loading or just hanging out". Entertainment Weekly's Brad Wete called the album "lyrically limited to getting high, stealing chicks, and blowing cash [...] Yet it burns with an underdog's passion and a champion's spite". Pitchfork Media's Sean Fennessey called it "mood music for the mindless" and wrote that its production team "has given this album surprising cohesion". Jon Dolan of Rolling Stone commented that Khalifa "manages to give life to those kinds of cash-gorged perma-baked clichés by warmly luxuriating in the space between pop's fresh-faced exuberance and hip-hop's easy arrogance".

== Commercial performance ==
The album debuted at number two on the US Billboard 200, with first-week sales of 197,000 copies in the United States behind Britney Spears' Femme Fatale which debuted at number one and opened up with first week sales of 276,000 copies in its first week alone. It entered at number 1 on Billboard's R&B/Hip-Hop Albums, and Rap Albums chart. In its second week, the album dipped to number 5 on the US Billboard 200 after selling additional 59,300 copies, bringing its total sales in the US to 257,500 copies. In its third and fourth week on the US charts, the album sold another 37,000 and 34,000 copies, bringing its total sales in the US to 328,000 copies. As of June 2015, the album has sold 892,000 copies in the United States. On June 22, 2016 the album was certified double platinum by the Recording Industry Association of America for combined sales and album-equivalent units of over two million units in the United States.

In Canada, Rolling Papers debuted at number 6 on the Canadian Albums Chart. The album debuted at number 47 on the UK Albums Chart, and in its second week, slipped to number 78. The album debuted at number 2 on the UK R&B Albums Chart, and maintained that position in its second week. Additionally, Rolling Papers debuted at number 35 on the Norwegian Albums Chart, number 49 on the Dutch Albums Chart and number 60 on the French Albums Chart.

== Track listing ==
No.	Title	Writer(s)	Producer(s)	Length
1.	"When I'm Gone"	Cameron Thomaz; Eric Dan, Jeremy Kulousek	Eric Dan, Big Jerm	4:09
2.	"On My Level" (featuring Too Short)	Thomaz; Todd Shaw; James Scheffer; Danny Morris	Jim Jonsin	4:32
3.	"Black and Yellow"	Thomaz; Mikkel Storleer Eriksen, Tor Erik Hermansen	StarGate	3:37
4.	"Roll Up"	Thomaz; Eriksen; Hermansen; Kevin McCall	StarGate	3:47
5.	"Hopes and Dreams"	Thomaz; Brandon Carrier	Brandon Carrier	3:59
6.	"Wake Up"	Thomaz; Eriksen; Hermansen	StarGate	3:46
7.	"The Race"	Thomaz; Dan; Kulousek	E. Dan; Big Jerm	5:35
8.	"Star of the Show" (featuring Chevy Woods)	Thomaz; Dan; Kevin "Chevy" Woods	E. Dan	4:46
9.	"No Sleep"	Thomaz; Benjamin Levin	Benny Blanco	3:12
10.	"Get Your Shit"	Thomaz; Dan	E. Dan	4:36
11.	"Top Floor"	Thomaz; Warren "Oak" Felder; Andrew "Pop" Wansel	Pop & Oak	3:42
12.	"Fly Solo"	Thomaz; Dan	E. Dan	3:20
13.	"Rooftops" (featuring Currensy)	Thomaz; Shante Franklin; Brandon Green	Bei Maejor	4:21
14.	"Cameras"	Thomaz; Dan	E. Dan	4:29

iTunes Store bonus track
No.	Title	Writer(s)	Producer(s)	Length
15.	"Taylor Gang" (featuring Chevy Woods)	Thomaz; Lexus Lewis; Woods	Lex Luger	5:35

Target deluxe edition (bonus tracks)
No.	Title	Writer(s)	Producer(s)	Length
15.	"Middle of You" (featuring Chevy Woods, Nikkiya and MDMA)	Thomaz; Dan; Nikkiya Brooks; William Washington; Jason Boyd; Woods	WLPWR; Hollywood Hot Sauce (co.)	4:16
16.	"Stoned"	Thomaz; Dan; Eriksen; Hermansen	StarGate	3:31

== Personnel ==
Credits for Rolling Papers adapted from Allmusic.

- Darren Ankenman – photography
- Chris Athens – mastering
- Benny Blanco – engineer, guitar, instrumentation, producer, programming, composer
- Amanda Berkowitz – A&R
- Big Jerm – engineer, producer, vocal engineer
- Tim Blacksmith – executive producer
- Christopher Bodie – illustrations
- Greg Gigendad Burke – art direction, design
- Brandon Carrier – composer, producer
- Eric Dan – engineer, mixing, producer, composer
- Danny D – executive producer
- Sarah Demarco – project coordinator
- Zvi Edelman – A&R
- Mikkel S. Eriksen – engineer, instrumentation, composer
- Oak Felder – composer
- Shante Franklin – composer
- Lanre Gaba – A&R
- Chris Gehringer – mastering
- Serban Ghenea – mixing
- Brandon Green – composer
- Benjy Grinberg – executive producer
- Kevin Woods – composer
- John Hanes – mixing
- Tor Erik Hermansen – instrumentation, composer
- Matt Huber – assistant, engineer
- Jim Jonsin – keyboards, producer, programming, composer
- Jeremy "J Boogs" Levin – production coordination
- Damien Lewis – assistant engineer
- Andrew Luftman – guitar
- Bei Maejor – producer
- Robert Marks – engineer, mixing
- Danny Morris – composer, keyboards
- Don Murray – engineer
- Tim Roberts – assistant engineer
- Nick Romei – package manager
- Todd Shaw – composer
- Stargate – producer
- Phil Tan – mixing
- Brad Post – mixing
- Cameron Thomaz – composer
- Miles Walker – engineer
- Lex Luger– producer
- Pop Wansel – composer, producer
- Jason Wilkie – assistant

== Charts ==
=== Weekly charts ===
Chart (2011–2022)	Peak position
Belgian Albums (Ultratop Wallonia)	188
Canadian Albums (Billboard)	6
Dutch Albums (Album Top 100)	49
French Albums (SNEP)	60
German Albums (Offizielle Top 100)	67
Hungarian Albums (MAHASZ)	40
Japan (Oricon)	54
Norwegian Albums (VG-lista)	35
Scottish Albums (Official Charts)	72
Swiss Albums (Schweizer Hitparade)	68
UK Albums (Official Charts)	47
UK R&B Albums (Official Charts)	4
US Billboard 200	2
US Top R&B/Hip-Hop Albums (Billboard)	1

=== Year-end charts ===
Chart (2011)	Peak position
US Billboard 200	38
US Top R&B/Hip-Hop Albums (Billboard)	10
US Rap Albums (Billboard)	6

Chart (2012)	Peak position
US Top R&B/Hip-Hop Albums (Billboard)	39
US Rap Albums (Billboard)	24

== Certifications ==
Region	Certification	Certified units/sales
Canada (Music Canada)	Gold	40,000^{^}
Denmark (IFPI Danmark)	Gold	10,000^{‡}
New Zealand (RMNZ)	Platinum	15,000^{‡}
United Kingdom (BPI)	Silver	60,000^{‡}
United States (RIAA)	3× Platinum	3,000,000^{‡}
^{^} Shipments figures based on certification alone.^{‡} Sales+streaming figures based on certification alone.

== Release history ==
Region	Date	Format(s)
United Kingdom	March 28, 2011	CD, digital download
Canada	March 29, 2011	CD, digital download
United States	March 29, 2011	CD, digital download
Japan	April 4, 2011	CD, digital download
