= XV (rapper) =

American rapper from Kansas

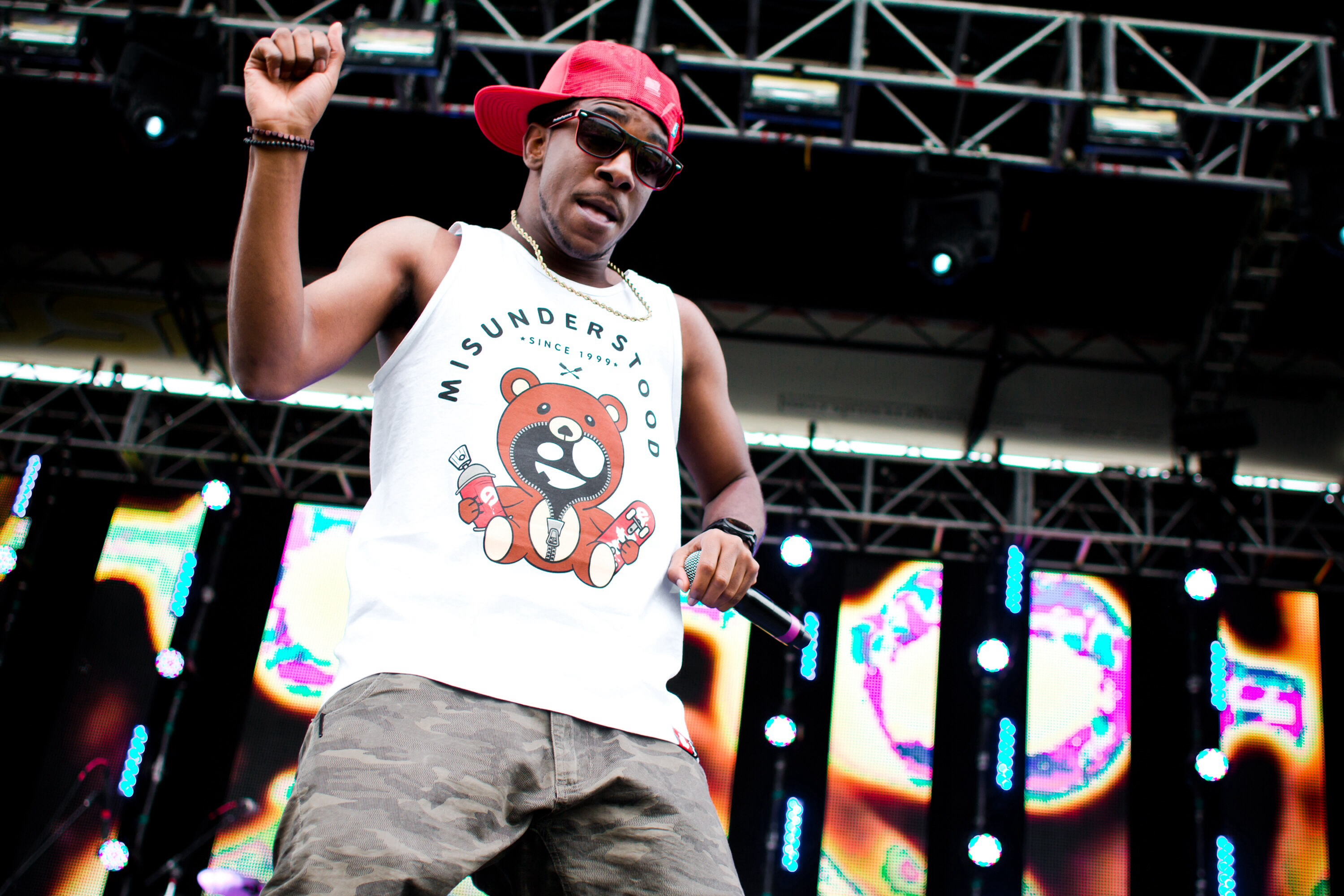
- Johnson in 2013

Background information
- Born: Donavan LaMond Johnson; July 9, 1985 (age 41); Wichita, Kansas, U.S.
- Genres: Hip hop
- Occupations: Rapper, singer, songwriter, record producer
- Instrument: Vocals
- Years active: 2000–present
- Label: Warner Bros.
- Website: squarians.com

Donavan LaMond Johnson (born July 9, 1985) better known by his famous stage name XV is an American rapper, singer and songwriter from Wichita, Kansas. He first gained major attention after the release of his twelfth mixtape Everybody's Nobody, for which he received two awards from DJBooth.net. His name, XV, refers to the age (15) at which he began his musical career. On Monday July 26, 2010, XV announced that he had signed a recording contract with Warner Bros. Records via his Twitter page.

== Music career ==
XV knew he wanted to pursue a career involving music. However, he did not become serious about the venture until a close friend died prior to him entering high school. His moniker, XV, the Roman numeral fifteen, refers to his age at the time he began his musical career. He graduated from Wichita Southeast High School in 2003. XV worked with producer Michael "Seven" Summers from 2005 to 2012, but since then the two have had a falling-out.

After releasing Everybody's Nobody, XV received national attention and subsequently signed a recording contract with Warner Bros. Records on July 26, 2010, which he announced via his Twitter account. Although two other labels were vying for the artist, he chose Warner Brothers stating he felt the label had room to expand. In an interview with HipHop DX, XV stated that his album The Kid with the Green Backpack was aimed to be released in the first quarter of 2013 with Just Blaze serving as the executive producer. The album was never released.

=== Mixtapes ===
The Square in the Circle

On July 8, 2008, XV released the mixtape Planet Squaria: The Square in the Circle as a free download. Most of the mixtape was produced by Summers, accompanied by samples of electronica bands Chromeo and Freezepop, and rock bands Gorillaz and Smashing Pumpkins. The mixtape also featured Lil' Wayne.

40 Days & 40 Nights

XV released a new song every morning and night for 40 days (80 tracks total) as a project for his blog. Afterwards he compiled the series into a mixtape available as a free download which featured both the morning and night songs in chronological order of their release dates. The mixtape included artists such as Usher, The Killers, Mickey Factz, Cory Gunz, Tyga, Wiz Khalifa, Kanye West, 88-Keys, and Flobots amongst others. There were 15 original tracks mixed in with the remixes and freestyles recorded over already-made beats.

Everybody's Nobody

XV's released Everybody's Nobody on July 31, 2009. The mixtape was hosted by DJ Enuff, mixed by DJ Benzi, and presented by Subconscious Threads and received 2500 downloads within the first 12 hours. Features include Wiz Khalifa, Big Sean, Colin Munroe, Harlem's Cash, and Ne-Yo. Most of the mixtape is produced by Seven. The song "Mirror's Edge" was premiered by DJ Enuff on New York City's top Rap/Hip-Hop radio station Hot 97 (WQHT) on July 3, 2009. The mixtape was also reviewed by DJBooth.net.

Everybody's Nobody was the first mixtape that helped XV gain fame outside of Kansas. Although the mix tape did not receive immediate acclaim, it has now been downloaded over 30,000 times. XV said of it, "I think that Everybody’s Nobody was it. I felt it was before I made it, I felt it was before it was released, when I sat there and watched the comments, and I saw the posts – and I still see, to this day, people sayin’, “I just heard of this dude XV. Download Everybody’s Nobody – this sh*t is crazy!" Like, seeing that on different days, and that came out July 31, and it's 2010, and people are still finding it – I feel like, that's what skyrocketed me to become XV. That was the project."

It has been stated that DJ Benzi will be remixing the mixtape under the new title Everybody's Nobody: We Got the Remix!.

Vizzy Zone

XV teamed up with DJ Ill Will & DJ Rockstar to produce Vizzy Zone. The project included all original production as well as features from the likes of Mike Posner, Talib Kweli, Bun B, Chiddy Bang, GLC, Colin Munroe, Killer Mike, and Mac Miller. Vizzy Zone, like Everybody's Nobody, received over 30,000 downloads. XV explained that he made Vizzy Zone for his fans to DJBooth. He said, "This one I’m really doin’ for my fans. I'm not doin’ it for my fans as far as, them just wanting music from me... And with me bein’ in the position I'm in right now, I need to hit them with something they can bump, since Everybody's Nobody came out seven, eight months ago. So that's my ultimate plan: give them some good music that follows up Everybody’s Nobody and that's as good as Everybody’s Nobody, while I prepare The Kid with the Green Backpack which, right now, is amazing." Vizzy Zone still received strong reviews, but many believe that it wasn't good enough to follow up Everybody's Nobody.

Zero Heroes

On April 15, 2011, XV released Zero Heroes. Critics have said it is the best XV release to date, and one of the top 2011 mixtapes. The mixtape features Patrick Stump of Fall Out Boy, Donnis, Kendrick Lamar, Cyhi Da Prynce, Vado, and more, along with Production from J. Cole, Just Blaze, Omen, The Awesome Sound, Swiff D, The Lieutenant, and of course longtime production partner Seven. Days later after the release, a bonus song came out entitled "Famous", featuring Jazmine Sullivan & Sez Batters. The mixtape has received over 120,000 downloads and 2 records in the Top 20 on The Hype Machine.

Popular Culture

On June 15, 2012, XV released Popular Culture. The mixtape features Slim The Mobster, Raja, B.o.B, Emilio Rojas, ScHoolboy Q, and XV's brother Sez Batters. Production from The Awesome Sound, Xaphoon Jones, D. Good, DJ Tech-Neek, TNGHT, and Odd Couple. The mixtape has received over 90,000 downloads.

Madness Begins (EP)

On March 18, 2014, XV released Madness Begins (EP). The mixtape has no feature but really good productions from The Awesome Sound, Zuki, Jay Beatz, Big Jerm and Childish Gambino. XV announces it's just the beginning of a series of projects.

March Madness Vol.2 : Sweet Sixteen

On March 21, 2014, just 2 days after Madness Begins (EP), XV released March Madness Vol.2 : Sweet Sixteen. On this mixtape, XV spits 16 new verses over 16 different bars and takes beats from 2Pac, The Notorious B.I.G., Kanye West, Wiz Khalifa, J. Cole, Pharrell Williams and more.

== Musical style and influences ==
XV's musical style employs the use of soulful, old school beats combined with a "futuristic twist". His voice is described as "youthful yet deep [with] a refreshing articulation", drawing comparisons to Drake. In an interview with Spinner, XV described his music as universal as he employs melodic beats but includes "heavy and hard hitting drums which keeps the hard and street essence of hip hop instilled in the music". He continued that his lyrics reflect his charismatic personality and he enjoys to play on words and create different song concepts. He also revealed his fascination with video games. One of his more popular songs, "Mirror's Edge", was inspired by the video game of the same name. He said, "The song isn't talking about the video game, I just felt it fit the same mood as that video game and I liked the fact that the game was about running free and defying laws of gravity in real life". He also created the song "Final Fantasy XV", which alludes to the Final Fantasy video game franchise, particularly Final Fantasy VII. In an interview with HipHop DX, XV described how he enjoys collaborating with other artists and learning about their styles and incorporating elements of them within his own. He cites fellow artists Andre 3000, Rivers Cuomo from Weezer, Jay-Z, John Mayer, Kanye West and Lupe Fiasco as inspirations for his music.

== Discography ==
=== Studio albums ===
- Complex (2006)
- The Dude with the Strap Back Dad Hat (2019)
- Winter Wolves (with Mike Summers) (2022)
- The Kid With The Green Backpack (2026)

=== EPs ===
Title	EP details
Awesome EP!	Released: May 15, 2012; Label: Warner Bros.; Format: CD, digital download
Day Ones	Released: June 5, 2019; Format: digital download

=== Mixtapes ===
- 2006: The Definition
- 2006: The Definition II
- 2006: The Complex Experiment, Vol. 1
- 2007: The Definition III
- 2007: The Complex Experiment, Vol. 2
- 2007: The Complex Experiment, Vol. 3
- 2007: The Definition IV
- 2008: Recycle Bin
- 2008: Planet Squaria: The Square in the Circle
- 2008: 40 Days/ 40 Nights
- 2009: Please, Hold
- 2009: Everybody's Nobody
- 2010: 30 Minute Layover
- 2010: Vizzy Zone
- 2011: Thanks For The Donuts
- 2011: Zero Heroes
- 2012: Popular Culture
- 2012: Squarians Vol. 1
- 2014: Madness Begins
- 2014: March Madness Vol. 2 Sweet Sixteen
- 2014: March Madness Vol. 3 Elite Eight
- 2014: March Madness Vol. 4 Final Four

=== Singles ===
List of singles, showing year released and album name
Title	Year	Album
"Awesome" (XV featuring Pusha T)	2011	Zero Heroes and Awesome EP!
