= Cabin Fever (mixtape) =

Mixtape by Wiz Khalifa
- Released: February 17, 2011
- Recorded: 2010
- Genre: Hip hop
- Label: Rostrum; Taylor Gang
- Producer: Lex Luger; Drumma Boy; Sonny Digital; RMB Justize; Hollywood HotSauce; DJ Spinz; WillPower; Beatz (Shantel Reed)

Wiz Khalifa chronology
Kush & Orange Juice (2010)	Cabin Fever (2011)	Rolling Papers (2011)

Cabin Fever is the ninth mixtape by American rapper Wiz Khalifa. It was released on February 17, 2011. The mixtape features guest appearances from Trae Tha Truth, Nikkiya, MDMA, Big Sean, Juicy J and Chevy Woods.

== Reception ==
=== Critical response ===
Sputnik Music gave Cabin Fever a very positive review, awarding it 4 out of 5 stars. Reviewer Jeremy Lin commented that the mixtape "mixes both his old and new style for a perfect balance" and called it better than Wiz's studio album "Rolling Papers". Gabriel Kramer of Live Music Guide praised the tracks "Phone Numbers," "Gangbang" and "Middle of You" and stated they "make the mixtape worth getting."

=== Commercial performance ===
The mixtape was widely successful and is the 15th most downloaded mixtape of all time on DatPiff as of February 2019 with over 1,562,050 downloads. It is certified Diamond on Datpiff.

== Track listing ==
No.	Title	Producer(s)	Length
1.	"Phone Numbers" (featuring Trae Tha Truth and Big Sean)	Drumma Boy	4:29
2.	"Cabin Fever"	Uneek Beatz (Shantel Reed)	2:28
3.	"GangBang" (featuring Big Sean)	Lex Luger	4:07
4.	"Errday" (featuring Juicy J)	Lex Luger	3:50
5.	"Taylor Gang" (featuring Chevy Woods)	Lex Luger	5:33
6.	"Hustlin'"	Lex Luger	3:27
7.	"Middle of You" (featuring Chevy Woods, Nikkiya, and MDMA)	WillPower; Hollywood HotSauce (co.)	4:06
8.	"WTF"	Lex Luger; Sonny Digital (add.)	2:57
9.	"Homicide" (featuring Chevy Woods)	RMB Justize; DJ Spinz (co.)	4:56
