= No Social Media =

Promotional single by Wiz Khalifa featuring Snoop Dogg
- Released: September 8, 2015
- Recorded: 2015
- Genre: Hip hop
- Length: 3:58
- Label: Taylor Gang; Atlantic; Rostrum
- Songwriters: Cameron Thomaz; Calvin Broadus; Eric Dan; Jeremy Kulousek; Zachary Vaughan; Rashod Odom
- Producers: I.D. Labs; Shod Beatz

"No Social Media" is a song written and performed by American hip hop recording artists Wiz Khalifa and Snoop Dogg. It was released on September 8, 2015. It was produced by I.D. Labs and Shod Beatz, and samples "Main Theme" by Kenji Kawai from the Higurashi When They Cry soundtrack.

== Commercial performance ==
"No Social Media" debuted at number 9 on the Billboard Twitter Top Tracks chart dated September 26, 2015.
