= Try Street Terminal =

- U.S. National Register of Historic Places
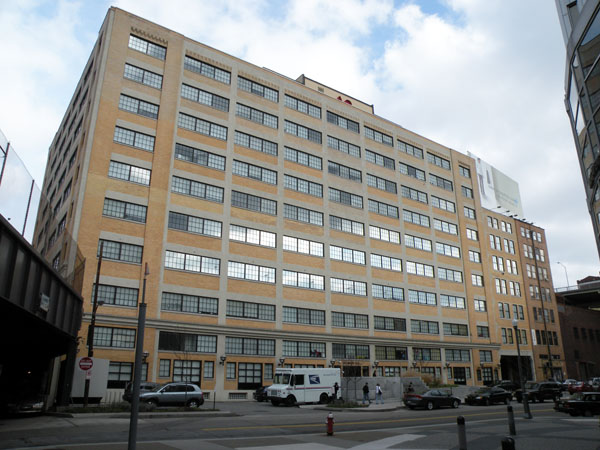

- Location within Pittsburgh Location within Pennsylvania Location within the United States
- Location: 600-620 2nd Ave., Pittsburgh, Pennsylvania
- Coordinates: 40°26′15″N 79°59′43″W
- Area: 1.2 acres (0.49 ha)
- Built: 1921
- Architect: Prack, Bernard H.
- Architectural style: Early Commercial
- NRHP reference No.: 07001327
- Added to NRHP: December 28, 2007

The Try Street Terminal (now "Terminal 21 Apartments", a luxury loft-style apartment building) in the Central Business District of Pittsburgh, Pennsylvania, is former 1921 freight terminal and warehouse designed in the "commercial utilitarian" style. It was listed on the National Register of Historic Places in 2007.

In 2011, the building and its streetscape were featured in the music video Black and Yellow.
