= The Race (Wiz Khalifa song) =

Single by Wiz Khalifa

from the album Rolling Papers
- Released: March 8, 2011
- Studio: ID Labs
- Genre: Pop rap; cloud rap
- Length: 5:35
- Label: Rostrum, Atlantic
- Songwriters: Cameron Thomaz, Eric Dan, Jeremy Kulousek
- Producer: ID Labs

Wiz Khalifa singles chronology
"On My Level" (2011)	"The Race" (2011)	"No Sleep" (2011)

"The Race" is a song by American rapper Wiz Khalifa from his third studio album Rolling Papers. The song was written by Khalifa and produced by Eric "E. Dan" Dan and Jeremy "Big Jerm" Kulousek for ID Labs. "The Race" was released as the third single from Rolling Papers on March 8, 2011, it debuted and peaked at number 66 on the Billboard Hot 100.

== Charts ==
Chart (2011)	Peak position
US Billboard Hot 100	66
