= Roll Up (Wiz Khalifa song) =

2011 single by Wiz Khalifa

Single by Wiz Khalifa

from the album Rolling Papers
- Released: February 3, 2011
- Genre: Pop-rap
- Length: 3:47
- Label: Rostrum, Atlantic
- Songwriters: Cameron Thomaz, Mikkel S. Eriksen, Tor Erik Hermansen, Kevin McCall
- Producer: Stargate

Wiz Khalifa singles chronology
"Black and Yellow" (2010)	"Roll Up" (2011)	"On My Level" (2011)

Music video
- "Roll Up" on YouTube

"Roll Up" is a song by American rapper Wiz Khalifa. It was released as the fourth single from his third studio album, Rolling Papers; having been written by Wiz Khalifa, Kevin McCall and Stargate.

The song peaked at number 13 on the Billboard Hot 100 and was certified double platinum by the Recording Industry Association of America (RIAA).

American recording artist and model Cassie Ventura is featured on the official music video. The video was shot in Venice, Los Angeles at Venice Beach.

== Live performances ==
Wiz Khalifa performed a short version "Roll Up" followed by "Black and Yellow" at the 2011 MTV Woodie Awards in March 2011. He later performed the song on the Late Show with David Letterman on April 11, 2011, and on Jimmy Kimmel Live in May 2011. The song was part of his 49-minute set during the final day of the 2011 Coachella Valley Music and Arts Festival. He also sang it at Bumbershoot in September 2011.

== Cover versions ==
"Roll Up" was covered by Canadian indie band Walk off the Earth on their 2012 album Vol 2. The Ready Set recorded a cover of the song for the 2011 compilation album Punk Goes Pop 4.

== Critical reception ==
Billboard gave the song a positive review, writing: "While 'Roll Up' is a noticeable change from Wiz Khalifa's previous releases, the tune's laid-back emotional vibe is an appreciated left turn." Maura Johnston of Popdust described "Roll Up" as "a breezy romantic ode" and continued, saying "The sing-song chorus, in which Wiz promises to 'roll up' whenever his woman wants him, isn't great, and it may have a popularity hiccup among those people who can appreciate the song’s sentiment but who aren’t ready to listen to it when their significant others are around. But it’s pretty infectious." Less appreciative, Lewis Corner of Digital Spy gave the song a three-star rating out of five and commented: "it unfortunately lacks the knockout hooks that its predecessor ["Black and Yellow"] so effortlessly flaunted – sounding more like a Nelly cast-off circa 2002 than a modern-day hip-hop classic."

== Chart performance ==
Roll Up debuted at number 48 on the US Billboard Hot 100, and peaked at number thirteen, becoming Khalifa's fifth-highest charting single as a solo artist behind "See You Again" (featuring Charlie Puth), "Black and Yellow", "No Sleep", and "Young, Wild & Free" (with Snoop Dogg featuring Bruno Mars). The single was eventually certified double platinum by the Recording Industry Association of America (RIAA) for sales of over two million copies in the United States.

== Track listing ==
Digital download

1. "Roll Up" – 3:47

== Charts ==
=== Weekly charts ===
Chart (2011)	Peak position
Canada (Canadian Hot 100)	56
Belgium (Ultratip Bubbling Under Flanders)	18
Belgium (Ultratip Bubbling Under Wallonia)	16
France (SNEP)	60
Ireland (IRMA)	49
UK Hip Hop/R&B (Official Charts)	13
UK Singles (Official Charts)	42
US Billboard Hot 100	13
US Hot R&B/Hip-Hop Songs (Billboard)	7
US Hot Rap Songs (Billboard)	2
US Pop Songs (Billboard)	14
US Rhythmic Airplay (Billboard)	4

=== Year-end charts ===
Chart (2011)	Position
US Billboard Hot 100	56
US Hot R&B/Hip-Hop Songs (Billboard)	48
US Rhythmic (Billboard)	18

== Certifications ==
Region	Certification	Certified units/sales
Canada (Music Canada)	Gold	40,000^{*}
United Kingdom (BPI)	Silver	200,000^{‡}
United States (RIAA)	2× Platinum	2,000,000^{‡}
^{*} Sales figures based on certification alone.^{‡} Sales+streaming figures based on certification alone.

== Release history ==
Region	Date	Label	Format
United States	3 February 2011	Atlantic Records	Digital download
United States	28 March 2011	Atlantic Records	Mainstream airplay
