= Kush & Orange Juice =

Mixtape by Wiz Khalifa
- Released: April 14, 2010
- Recorded: 2009
- Studio: I.D. Labs
- Genre: Hip-hop
- Length: 57:27
- Labels: Rostrum; Taylor Gang
- Producers: Big Jerm; Cardo; Johnny Juliano; Kajmir Royale; Sermstyle; Sledgren; VVS Sound; XO; The WatcherZ; Big K.R.I.T.; Nesby Phips

Wiz Khalifa chronology
Deal or No Deal (2009)	Kush & Orange Juice (2010)	Cabin Fever (2011)

Kush & Orange Juice (stylized as Kush and OJ) is the eighth mixtape by American rapper Wiz Khalifa. It was released on April 14, 2010, by Taylor Gang Records and Rostrum Records. Kush & Orange Juice gained notoriety after its official release by making it the number-one trending topic on both Google and Twitter. On the same day, a link to the mixtape was posted for download on Khalifa's Twitter. The hashtag #kushandorangejuice became the number-six trending topic on the microblogging service after its release and remained on the top trending items on Twitter for three days. On April 18, 2025, Khalifa released a sequel titled Kush & Orange Juice 2.

== Title and artwork ==
In an interview with MTV's Mixtape Daily, Wiz Khalifa stated that Kush and Orange Juice would be the title for this release, because "it's perfect for wake-and-bake".

The mixtape's cover artwork is an homage to David Ruffin's 1980 album Gentleman Ruffin. The subject matter mainly consists of partying, women, sex, and marijuana.

== Samples ==
The eighth track, "The Kid Frankie" samples the Loose Ends song "Hangin' on a String". Khalifa has stated that the song was inspired by the character Frankie from the film The Business, who listens to Loose Ends during the movie. The tenth track, "Never Been", samples "Schala's Theme" from the soundtrack to the video game Chrono Trigger, composed by Yasunori Mitsuda. The ninth track, "Up", samples Tevin Campbell's "Could It Be". The eleventh track, "In the Cut" samples Frou Frou's "Let Go", as performed in the end credits of the film Garden State. The third track, "We're Done", samples "Our Time Is Here", a track from the Camp Rock soundtrack performed by Demi Lovato.

== Critical reception ==
Upon its release, the mixtape received critical acclaim, with New York Magazine calling the mixtape "a nice showcase of the youngun's commercial appeal", and that it "makes us think classic G-Funk (specifically, DJ Quik) and a party mindset". Entertainment Weekly stated that the mixtape was "pretty solid", and "difficult to resist". PopMatters called it "a great listen." Pitchfork Media rated the mixtape 7.2 out of 10, stating "for the most part, Kush and Orange Juice is a surprisingly relaxed and easy listen".

== Track listing ==
No.	Title	Producer(s)	Length
1.	"Waken Baken"	Sledgren	1:29
2.	"Mezmorized"	Cardo	4:29
3.	"We're Done" (featuring Demi Lovato)	Kajmir Royale	2:19
4.	"Skit 1"		1:22
5.	"The Statement"	VVS Sound	2:47
6.	"Spotlight" (featuring Killa Kyleon)	The WatcherZ	4:13
7.	"Skit 2"		1:22
8.	"The Kid Frankie"	Big Jerm	3:15
9.	"Up"	XO	4:18
10.	"Never Been"	Sledgren	3:34
11.	"In the Cut"	Cardo	4:14
12.	"Visions"	Sledgren	3:05
13.	"Still Blazin" (featuring Alborosie)	Sermstyle	3:27
14.	"Slim Skit"		3:41
15.	"Pedal to the Metal" (featuring Johnny Juliano)	Juliano; Superstar O	3:27
16.	"Good Dank"	E. Dan	5:06
17.	"Skit 3"		0:53
18.	"Glass House" (featuring Curren$y and Big K.R.I.T.)	Big K.R.I.T.	3:16
19.	"Outro"	Sledgren	1:31
20.	"Supply" (featuring Nesby Phips)	Nesby Phips	2:59
Total length:			57:26
