= Chevy Woods =

American rapper (born 1981)

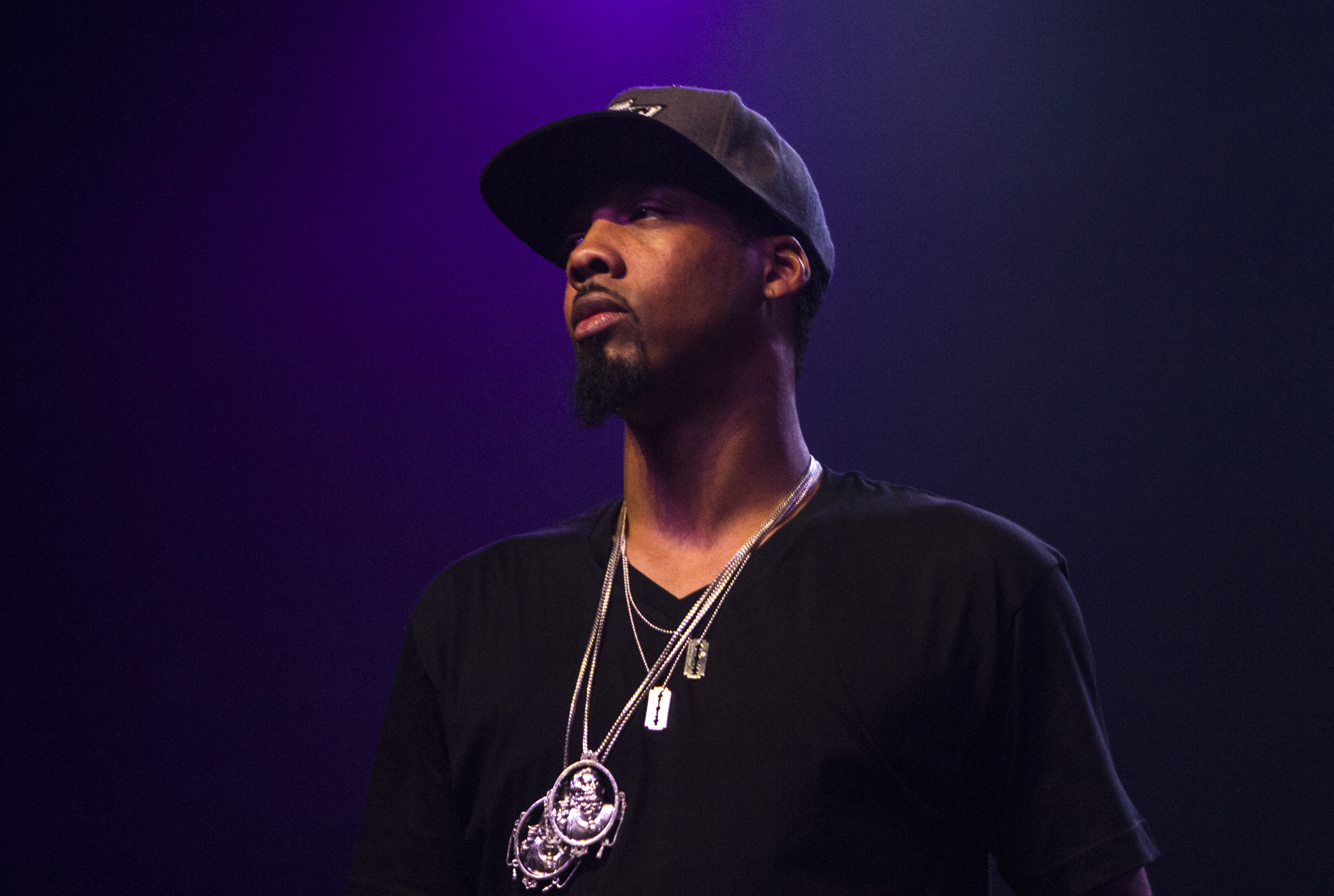
- Woods performing in December 2013

Background information
- Also known as: Kev tha Hustla
- Born: Kevin Lee Woods; May 13, 1981 (age 45); Pittsburgh, Pennsylvania, U.S.
- Genres: Hip hop
- Occupations: Rapper; songwriter
- Years active: 2002–present
- Labels: Taylor Gang; Rostrum; Atlantic; Jet Life; Heavy Hustle
- Website: chevywoodsmusic.com

Kevin Lee "Chevy" Woods (born May 13, 1981) is an American rapper and songwriter from Pittsburgh, Pennsylvania. He is best known for his affiliation with hometown native rapper Wiz Khalifa, having signed to his Taylor Gang record label as among its first signees in the late 2000s. Woods made his first major appearance on Khalifa's 2011 song "Taylor Gang," which received gold certification by the Recording Industry Association of America (RIAA). He has released the collaborative project The Cookout (2011) with Khalifa, as well as his Gangland mixtape series.

== Career ==
=== 2003–2010: Early career, Taylor Gang formation and mixtapes ===
Woods started rapping as a child with friends using instrumentals for background music. After graduating high school, he attended Robert Morris University as an athlete and grew his passion for rapping. Woods became serious about rap when he met another musician who created and distributed his own mixtapes. He wanted to pursue music and began writing and rapping under the name Kev Tha Hustla.

In 2004, he met fellow Pittsburgh, Pennsylvania rapper Wiz Khalifa, through Pennsylvania producers I.D. Labs, who collaborated with Khalifa. Woods and Khalifa formed a partnership, which led to the formation of the group Taylor Gang in 2008. Woods released two mixtapes, The Corner's Correspondent in 2008 and Animal in 2009. His first two mixtapes featured collaborations with Wiz Khalifa, Boaz and members of Heavy Hustle Records. Production was primarily handled by I.D. Labs and Sledgren. On August 3, 2010, Woods was featured on the track “Paper Route” from Mac Miller's mixtape K.I.D.S. In September 2010, Woods released his third official mixtape Pilot Shit.

=== 2011: Red Cup Music and The Cookout ===
In February 2011, Wiz Khalifa released his ninth mixtape, Cabin Fever, which featured Woods on three tracks, including "Taylor Gang", "Middle of You" and "Homicide". Woods released his fourth mixtape Red Cup Music, which featured guest appearances by Juicy J, French Montana, and production by ID Labs and Mac Miller in March 2011. Woods told MTV, the Red Cup Music was "really when I found a style for myself, some laid-back, cool music. Drink a little bit, smoke a little bit." Khalifa released the music video for the Lex Luger-produced track "Taylor Gang" in April 2011, which became an iTunes bonus track on Khalifa's debut studio album Rolling Papers. The song peaked at number 22 on the Billboard Bubbling Under Hot 100 Singles chart. In April 2013, Khalifa went on tour in support of Rolling Papers with Woods and Big Sean. This tour introduced Woods to Khalifa's mainstream audience. In August 2011, Woods released a mixtape, titled The Cookout, which featured Wiz Khalifa.

After Khalifa officially founded Taylor Gang Records, Woods was immediately added to the roster. The Cookout mixtape, produced by ID Labs, Sledgren, Cardo, Key Wane and Big Jerm, was released in September 2011 and featured Wiz Khalifa on eight of the eleven tracks. The mixtape received positive reviews from XXL, who praised the production, but mentioned Woods was overshadowed by Khalifa throughout the tape. However, MTV disagreed calling Woods the mixtape's star and praised his laid back flow.

=== 2012-2015: Gangland mixtape series and The 48 Hunnid Project ===
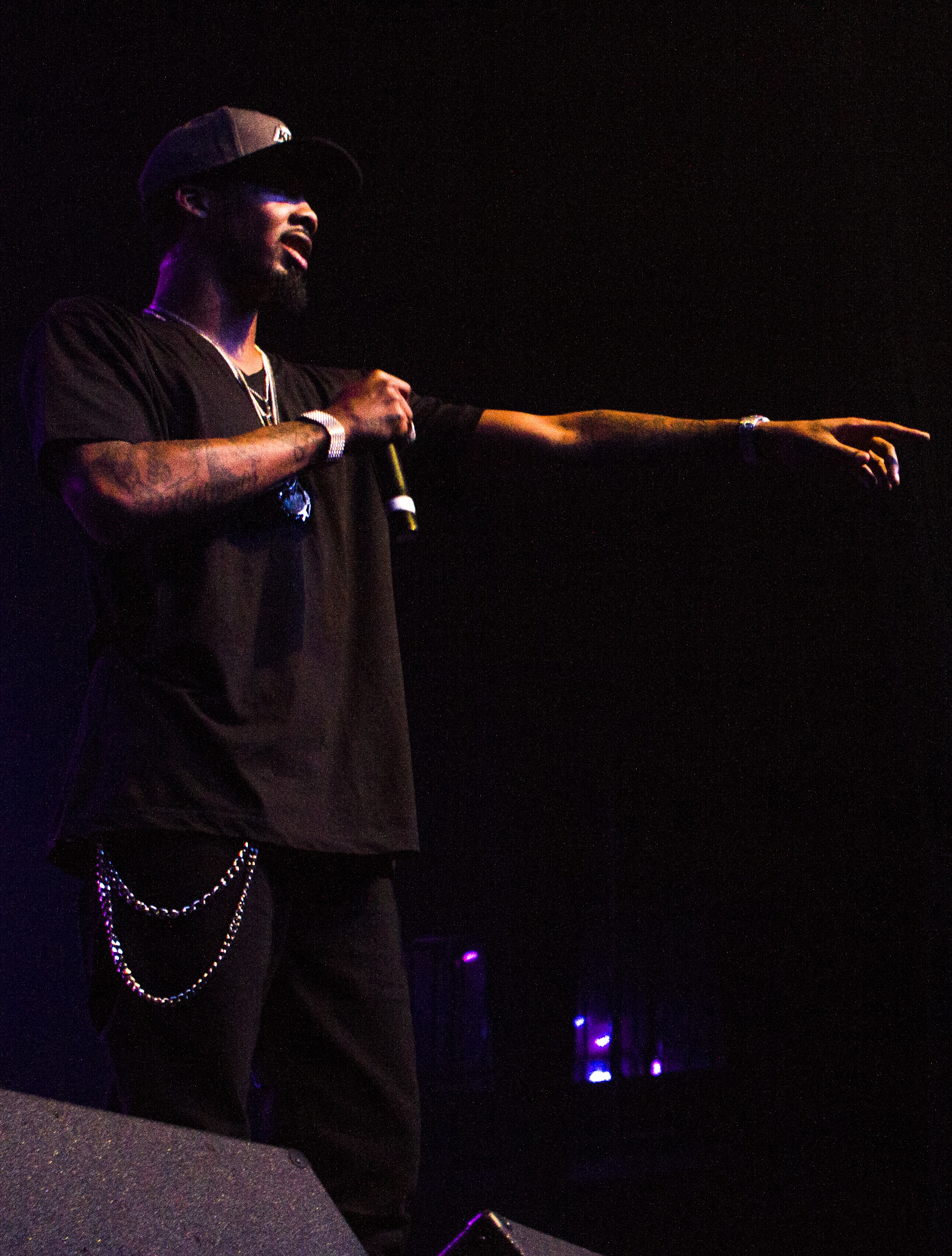
Chevy Woods performing on The Smoker's Club Tour in December 2013.

In 2012, Woods released a new mixtape, titled Gangland, which consisted of dark material influenced by Woods early life on the streets, and the television show Gangland. Woods along with the rest of Taylor Gang Records, Lola Monroe, Juicy J, and Wiz Khalifa appeared on the May 2012 cover of The Source. Gangland, produced by Lex Luger, I.D. Labs, Cardo, Sonny Digital, Key Wane, Sledgren and Harry Fraud, was released in June 2012 and featured Taylor Gang's Wiz Khalifa, Lola Monroe, Juicy J, Tuki Carter, as well as artists Soulja Boy, Trae Tha Truth, and Young Jerz. In a XXL review of Gangland, the magazine stated, "Over the past two years, Taylor Gang's Chevy Woods has gradually built up his name with mixtapes like Red Cup Music and The Cookout. Progressing with each release, Wiz's budding sidekick has shown he can hang high without resting on the back of his co-pilot. On his latest offering, Gang Land, Chevy flies high and gives the world an in depth look into his life as a Taylor Gang aviator." Following the release of Gangland, Woods worked on his next mixtape and his debut studio album. Woods went on the first Under the Influence of Music concert tour with Khalifa, Mac Miller, Schoolboy Q and Kendrick Lamar in support of Gangland in July and August 2012, . He toured with the rest of Taylor Gang Records on the 2050 Tour from October through December 2012. During the tour, Woods announced that his next mixtape would be titled Gangland 2. In 2013, he toured on the second Under the Influence tour with Khalifa, ASAP Mob, B.o.B, Joey Badass, Ty Dolla Sign, Pro Era, Berner, and Trinidad James.

In August 2013, Woods told HotNewHipHop, his debut album would contain production by Sledgren and C4, the track list for Gangland 2 was finalized, and it would be hosted by DJ Drama. Woods released the cover artwork for Gangland 2 in September 2013. He toured North America with Joey Badass, Ab-Soul, The Underachievers, and Pro Era on the fourth annual The Smoker's Club tour in October and November 2013. Woods released Gangland 2, a mixtape featuring guest appearances from Wiz Khalifa, Juicy J, Trinidad James, Young Scooter, King Los and Compton Menace, via Taylor Gang Records in October 2013. Woods released his first retail single "30 Deep" via Taylor Gang in April 2014 and announced in September 2014 that he would release a retail EP. He made two appearances on Wiz Khalifa's third studio album Blacc Hollywood, on "Still Down" and spoke on the intro to the album. Woods toured with rapper Kevin Gates in July and August 2014.

In January 2015, Woods released the third installment of his Gangland series featuring production from Ricky P, Zaytoven, Sonny Digital, Ty Dolla Sign and more. In August 2015, Woods produced and released The 48 Hunnid Project, his first retail release. The project named for the neighborhood where Woods was raised, took 12 years to create and encompassed his experiences from being a child through adulthood. He also toured with Wiz Khalifa on the Boys of Zummer Tour with Fall Out Boy.

=== 2016-2017: TGOD Volume 1, Gang Sh*t Only, and Thanks For Everything ===
On February 26, 2016, Chevy woods released a 4 track extended play called And The Story Goes. On October 11, 2016 Taylor Gang Records released a compilation mixtape titled TGOD Volume 1 with all the members including Wiz Khalifa, Berner, Juicy J, Ty Dolla $ign among others. On November 11, 2016, Gang Sh*t Only was released with features from Wiz Khalifa, Hardo, Stevie B, FTR Drama and Rich The Kid with production Honorable C.N.O.T.E., 808 Mafia, K.E. on the Track among others. On May 13, 2017, Chevy Woods released a 14 track mixtape titled Freemix 1.5 Reloaded. Exactly What They Want was released on September 28, 2017, with features from Wiz Khalifa, Bigga Rankin and K Camp with production from K.E. on the Track, Yung Lan, Stevie B among others. Thanks For Everything was released on December 23, 2017, with features from Wiz Khalifa on the tracks All Love and Joint & A Lighter with production from K.E. on the Track, Yung Lan, OG Parker among others.

=== 2018-present: 81, Lewis Park Legend and New 90's ===
On June 15, 2018, Chevy Woods released the mixtape titled 81 with a feature from Wiz Khalifa on the track Bitch You Lyin and production from K.E. on the Track, Tay Keith, Beat Mechanics among others. On December 19, 2018, Chevy Woods dropped a new mixtape titled Lewis Park Legend. On May 13, 2019, Chevy Woods released a new mixtape titled New 90's. On July 3, 2020, Chevy Woods dropped a debut album titled Since Birth.

== Discography ==
=== Studio albums ===
Title	Album details
Since Birth	Released: July 3, 2020; Label: Taylor Gang Records; Format: Digital download
1998	Released: February 23, 2024; Label: Taylor Gang Records; Format: Digital download

=== Extended plays ===
Title	Album details
SXSW I Love Texas	Released: March 18, 2015; Label: Taylor Gang Records; Format: Digital download
The 48 Hunnid Project	Released: August 7, 2015; Label: Taylor Gang Records; Format: Digital download
And the Story Goes	Released: February 26, 2016; Label: Taylor Gang Records; Format: Digital download
Mask On	Released: April 23, 2021; Label: Taylor Gang Records; Format: Digital download

=== Mixtapes ===
List of mixtapes
Title	Album details
The Corner's Correspondent (as Kev tha Hustla)	Released: 2008; Label: Heavy Hustle Records; Format: Digital download
Animal (as Kev tha Hustla)	Released: 2009; Label: Heavy Hustle Records; Format: Digital download
Pilot Shit	Released: September 13, 2010; Label: Heavy Hustle Records, Taylor Gang; Format: Digital download
Red Cup Music	Released: March 17, 2011; Label: Taylor Gang; Format: Digital download
The Cookout	Released: September 24, 2011; Label: Taylor Gang Records; Format: Digital download
Gangland	Released: June 6, 2012; Label: Taylor Gang Records; Format: Digital download
Gangland 2	Released: October 24, 2013; Label: Taylor Gang Records; Format: Digital download
Gangland 3	Released: January 27, 2015; Label: Taylor Gang Records; Format: Digital download
TGOD Volume 1	Released: October 11, 2016; Label: Taylor Gang Records, Rostrum; Format: Digital download
Gang Sh*t Only	Released: November 11, 2016; Label: Taylor Gang Records; Format: Digital download
Freemix 1.5: Reloaded	Released: May 13, 2017; Label: Taylor Gang Records; Format: Digital download
Exactly What They Want	Released: September 28, 2017; Label: Taylor Gang Records; Format: Digital download
Thanks For Everything	Released: December 23, 2017; Label: Taylor Gang Records; Format: Digital download
81	Released: June 15, 2018; Label: Taylor Gang Records; Format: Digital download
Lewis Park Legend	Released: December 19, 2018; Label: Taylor Gang Records; Format: Digital download
New 90's	Released: May 13, 2019; Label: Taylor Gang Records; Format: Digital download
Big Woods Season	Released: March 18, 2021; Label: Taylor Gang Records; Format: Digital download

=== Singles ===
==== As lead artist ====
List of singles as lead performer, with selected chart positions, showing year released and album name
Title	Year	Peak chart positions			Album
Title	Year	US	US R&B	US Rap	Album
"30 Deep"	2014	—	—	—	Non-album single
"All Said and Done" (featuring Dej Loaf)	2015	—	—	—	The 48 Hunnid Project
"—" denotes a recording that did not chart or was not released in that territory.

=== Other charted songs ===
Title	Year	Peak chart positions		Album
Title	Year	US	US R&B	Album
"Taylor Gang" (Wiz Khalifa featuring Chevy Woods)	2011	122	118	Rolling Papers
"Medicated" (Wiz Khalifa featuring Juicy J and Chevy Woods)	2013	—	44	O.N.I.F.C.
"—" denotes releases that did not chart.
