= Black and Yellow =

2010 single by Wiz Khalifa

Single by Wiz Khalifa

from the album Rolling Papers
- Released: September 14, 2010
- Genre: Hip hop
- Length: 3:37
- Label: Rostrum; Atlantic
- Songwriters: Cameron Thomaz; Mikkel S. Eriksen; Tor Erik Hermansen
- Producer: Stargate

Wiz Khalifa singles chronology
"This Plane" (2009)	"Black and Yellow" (2010)	"Roll Up" (2011)

Audio sample
- file; help

"Black and Yellow" is a song by American rapper Wiz Khalifa from his third studio album, Rolling Papers. It was released on September 14, 2010, as the lead single from the album. The song was written by Khalifa, along with Stargate, who produced it. It was released as a CD single in honor of Record Store Day. The song peaked at number one on the Billboard Hot 100, becoming Wiz Khalifa's first number-one single in the US.

The song is about growing up in Pittsburgh, Pennsylvania, and also Khalifa's car, a yellow Dodge Challenger Hemi with black stripes. He has stated that he got the car in those colors as a tribute to his hometown of Pittsburgh, whose official colors are black and gold, and its professional sports teams, all of whose colors are black and some variation of gold or yellow.

The flag of the city of Pittsburgh

The song itself does not mention Pittsburgh or sports, although the song's music video made the connection to Pittsburgh explicit, showing various iconic locations in the city, as well as apparel associated with the football team the Pittsburgh Steelers, the hockey team the Pittsburgh Penguins, and the baseball team the Pittsburgh Pirates. In the year after it was released, "Black and Yellow" spawned dozens of remixes, parodies and remakes, both in the U.S. and internationally, many of them made in tribute to a local sports team. At Super Bowl XLV in 2011, which featured the Steelers competing against the Green Bay Packers, the Steelers used "Black and Yellow" as their fight song, while the Packers used a remix by Lil Wayne called "Green and Yellow", marking the first time both teams at the Super Bowl had used the same song. The song earned Khalifa his first Grammy nominations, for Best Rap Song and Best Rap Performance at the 2012 ceremony.

== Chart performance ==
On the issue dated October 2, 2010, "Black and Yellow" debuted at No. 100 on the Billboard Hot 100. It then dropped out the following week and re-entered at No. 64 on the issue dated October 30, 2010. On its eighteenth charting week, the song rose to No. 1 on the issue dated February 19, 2011, selling 198,000 digital copies that week. "Black and Yellow" has sold 4,144,922 digital copies since release.

== Music video ==
The music video was directed by Bill Paladino. It was filmed in Pittsburgh and features sights of the city, including the U.S. Steel Tower, BNY Mellon Center, PPG Place, William Penn Hotel, Citizens Bank Tower, Union Trust Building, One PNC Plaza, K&L Gates Center the Three Sisters and Smithfield Street bridges, Station Square, Shannon Hall of the Art Institute of Pittsburgh and the smoke stacks of the former U.S. Steel Homestead Works at The Waterfront adjacent to the city. The video also prominently features city icons such as the Terrible Towel, a rally towel for the Pittsburgh Steelers, and city sports in general, as well as Pittsburgh Pirates apparel. It was recorded in Chatsworth Avenue, Pittsburgh, PA.

== In popular culture ==
- The song was featured in the soundtrack for the 2011 film Footloose.
- In a 2012 commercial for the video game Madden NFL 13, Paul Rudd sings the song while playing the game as the Pittsburgh Steelers against Ray Lewis.
- On April 7, 2014, Jimmy Kimmel Live! held a skit called "American Sign Language Rap Battle." Khalifa performed the song as three ASL-certified interpreters competed.
- The song was featured in multiple trailers for the 2017 film The Lego Batman Movie.
- The song was an anthem for 1% Motorcycle club Satudarah due to its black and yellow club colors.
- The song is used by the Tucson Sugar Skulls of the Indoor Football League after every touchdown scored at the Tucson Convention Center by the Sugar Skulls.

== Remixes ==
The official remix, "Black & Yellow (G-Mix)" features fellow American rappers Snoop Dogg and Juicy J, and singer T-Pain. Wiz Khalifa has a new verse on the track. The song leaked on December 12, 2010, but was officially released on December 16. A video for the remix was shot and was released on January 8, 2011. A remix by just T-Pain, "Black & Yellow (T-Mix)", featured the verse that was later put on the official remix. An anime version fan remix was also made combining the song and Hidamari Sketch's opening music, "Sketch Switch". A remix created for Malaysia national football team titled "Harimau Malaya" (Malayan tiger) was performed by AUB featuring Mr. Dan and MC Syze contains some of the original song lyrics with major change to adapt with Malaysia.

== Track listing ==
- Digital download
1. "Black and Yellow" (Explicit Album Version) – 3:37
- Digital download (G-Mix)
1. "Black and Yellow" (G-Mix) (featuring Snoop Dogg, Juicy J & T-Pain) – 4:38

== Remakes and freestyles ==
Many remakes have been made, mostly in tribute to other sports teams, referring to their respective pair of colors. Some of the notable remakes include:

- "Purp & Yellow" by The Game, Snoop Dogg, and YG, representing the Los Angeles Lakers. This version also had a remix produced by DJ Skee, with a rock-instrumented backing track; a music video for the DJ Skee remix featured the artists as well as members of the Lakers. An extended mix was released the next day, also featuring Kendrick Lamar, Joe Moses and Thurzday.
- "Rossonero (Red and Black)" by Denny La Home feat. Jake La Furia – Italian version performed by two Italian rappers. The colors refer to Italian football club AC Milan.
- "Eff Australia" by Rucka Rucka Ali – an anti-Australian song parody to the tune of the original.
- "Green and Yellow" by Lil Wayne, representing the Green Bay Packers, who defeated the Pittsburgh Steelers in Super Bowl XLV in 2011.
- "White and Navy" by Fabolous representing New York City, and the New York Yankees.
- "Black and Yellow (Mike Tomlin)" by Wale, in reference to the Steelers' head coach Mike Tomlin.
- "Yeah Carmelo" by Maino, in reference to Carmelo Anthony of the New York Knicks.
- "Black and Red" by Jermaine Dupri representing the Atlanta Falcons.
- "Black and Orange" by San Quinn representing the San Francisco Giants in their 2010 World Series victory.
- "White and Purple" by Chet Haze (son of actor Tom Hanks), representing Northwestern University.
- "Black and Yellow" by Tyler Ward and Crew and Cobus, a rock version.
- "Black and Ghetto" by Serius Jones describing the lifestyle of being an African American gangster.
- "Green and Purple" by Kritikal which refers to marijuana and the culture surrounding it.
- "Black and Yellow" by Chris Cobbins
- "Gold N Blue" by 6'6 240 about West Virginia University's football team the West Virginia Mountaineers.
- "Black Camaro" by T-Pain, Fabolous, Maino and Young Jeezy representing the return of the Camaro in 7 years for the 2010 Fifth Generation Camaro.
- "Byalo, Zeleno i Cherveno (White, Green, and Red)" by Big Sha ft. Sarafa, Xplicit, Konsa representing the Flag of Bulgaria. In 2012, the song caused nationwide controversy culminating in a government lawsuit against the artist, subsequently dropped in 2013.
- "Red and Yellow" by IRV DA PHENOM – a parody to the tune of the original. It was used in the "Best Friends Day" promotional of the 2024 Marvel Cinematic Universe film Deadpool & Wolverine.
- ”Brown and Yellow” by play-by-play announcer Tommy Maroon about the 2025 Baldwin Wallace Yellow Jackets women’s basketball team that would win the Ohio Athletic Conference and reach the Elite Eight.

In addition, a number of freestyle versions have been released, of artists rapping over "Black and Yellow"'s instrumental track, without any overt reference to the song or to sports teams. These include versions by Crooked I (who included a chorus of "packing metal"), Donnis, Young Jeezy, Tyga, Novi Novak, and Layzie Bone and Flesh-n-Bone of Bone Thugs-n-Harmony. A Game of Thrones parody version of the song was released in 2012 representing House Baratheon, specifically Robert, Stannis, and Renly Baratheon.

== Charts ==
=== Weekly charts ===
Chart (2010–2011)	Peak position
Australia (ARIA)	24
Australia (ARIA Urban Singles)	9
Austria (Ö3 Austria Top 40)	44
Belgium (Ultratip Bubbling Under Flanders)	2
Belgium (Ultratop 50 Wallonia)	46
Canada Hot 100 (Billboard)	7
Czech Republic Airplay (ČNS IFPI)	26
Denmark (Tracklisten)	12
Finland (Suomen virallinen lista)	2
France (SNEP)	38
Germany (GfK)	31
German Airplay Chart	91
Ireland (IRMA)	14
Netherlands (Single Top 100)	44
New Zealand (RIANZ)	21
Poland (Polish Airplay New)	3
Slovakia Airplay (ČNS IFPI)	26
Sweden (Sverigetopplistan)	28
Switzerland (Schweizer Hitparade)	44
UK Hip Hop/R&B (Official Charts)	2
UK Singles (Official Charts)	5
US Billboard Hot 100	1
US Hot R&B/Hip-Hop Songs (Billboard)	6
US Hot Rap Songs (Billboard)	1
US Pop Airplay (Billboard)	18
US Rhythmic Airplay (Billboard)	1

=== Year-end charts ===
Chart (2011)	Position
Brazil (Crowley)	191
Canada (Canadian Hot 100)	60
UK Singles (Official Charts Company)	62
US Billboard Hot 100	31
US Hot R&B/Hip-Hop Songs (Billboard)	41
US Rhythmic (Billboard)	14

== Certifications ==
Region	Certification	Certified units/sales
Australia (ARIA)	Platinum	70,000^{^}
Canada (Music Canada)	3× Platinum	240,000^{*}
Denmark (IFPI Danmark)	Platinum	90,000^{‡}
France (SNEP)	Platinum	200,000^{‡}
Germany (BVMI)	Gold	150,000^{‡}
Italy (FIMI)	Platinum	50,000^{‡}
New Zealand (RMNZ)	2× Platinum	60,000^{‡}
Spain (Promusicae)	Gold	50,000^{‡}
Sweden (GLF)	Platinum	40,000^{‡}
United Kingdom (BPI)	Platinum	600,000^{‡}
United States (RIAA)	Diamond	10,000,000^{‡}
Streaming
Denmark (IFPI Danmark)	Gold	900,000^{†}
^{*} Sales figures based on certification alone.^{^} Shipments figures based on certification alone.^{‡} Sales+streaming figures based on certification alone.^{†} Streaming-only figures based on certification alone.
