= On My Level =

Single by Wiz Khalifa featuring Too Short

from the album Rolling Papers
- Released: May 28, 2011
- Genre: Hip hop
- Length: 4:35
- Label: Rostrum, Atlantic
- Songwriters: Cameron Thomaz; Tod Anthony Shaw; James Scheffer; Danny Morris
- Producers: Jim Jonsin; Danny Morris (co.)

Wiz Khalifa singles chronology
"Roll Up" (2011)	"On My Level" (2011)	"Bright Lights Bigger City" (2011)

Too Short singles chronology
"Bitch" (2010)	"On My Level" (2011)	"First Date" (2012)

"On My Level" is a song by American rapper Wiz Khalifa featuring fellow American rapper Too $hort released as the first promotional, and later third official single from the former's third studio album, Rolling Papers (2011). The song was written by the artists alongside producer Jim Jonsin and co-producer Danny Morris. It was later sent to urban contemporary radio stations on May 28, 2011. The song debuted, and peaked at number fifty-two on the Billboard Hot 100 and has been certified Platinum by the RIAA.

== Chart performance ==
The song debuted at number 52 on the Billboard Hot 100, then dropped to number 56 before falling off the chart. After being released as an official single, it re-entered at number 79 and remained on the charts for another seven weeks.

== Music video ==
A music video was released for the song. It had both Wiz Khalifa and Too $hort, and featured cameos by Nipsey Hussle and DJ Drama.

== Charts ==
=== Weekly charts ===
Chart (2011)	Peak position
Canada Hot 100 (Billboard)	96
US Billboard Hot 100	52
US Hot R&B/Hip-Hop Songs (Billboard)	16
US Hot Rap Songs (Billboard)	10
US Rhythmic Airplay (Billboard)	38

=== Year-end charts ===
Chart (2011)	Position
US Hot R&B/Hip-Hop Songs (Billboard)	88

== Certifications ==
Region	Certification	Certified units/sales
United States (RIAA)	Platinum	1,000,000^{*}
^{*} Sales figures based on certification alone.

== Release history ==
Country	Date	Format	Label
United States	Feb 22, 2011	Digital download	Rostrum, Atlantic
United States	May 28, 2011	Urban contemporary	Rostrum, Atlantic
