= Big Jerm =

Big Jerm is the nickname of:

- Jeremy Koling (born 1985), American disc golfer
- Jeremy "Big Jerm" Kulousek (fl. from 2003), of ID Labs
