= Taylor Gang Entertainment =

American independent record label

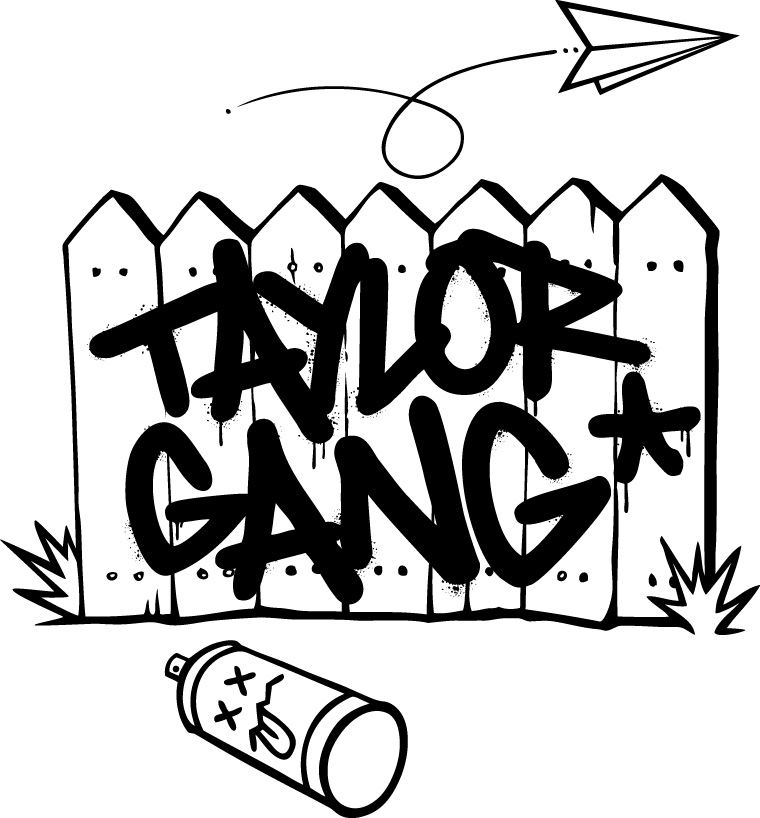
- Founded: 2008
- Founder: Wiz Khalifa
- Distributors: Asylum Records/Atlantic Records Group; BMG Rights Management
- Genre: Hip hop
- Location: Pittsburgh, Pennsylvania, U.S.
- Official website: taylorgang.com

Taylor Gang Entertainment is an American entertainment company. Co-founded by rapper Wiz Khalifa in 2008, it operates as an independent record label, music management, music production and film company based in Pittsburgh, Pennsylvania. The record label is home to artists such as Wiz Khalifa, Berner, and Juicy J who serves as A&R for the label. TM88 is a producer for the label. The company is currently headquartered at ID Labs in Pittsburgh.

== History ==
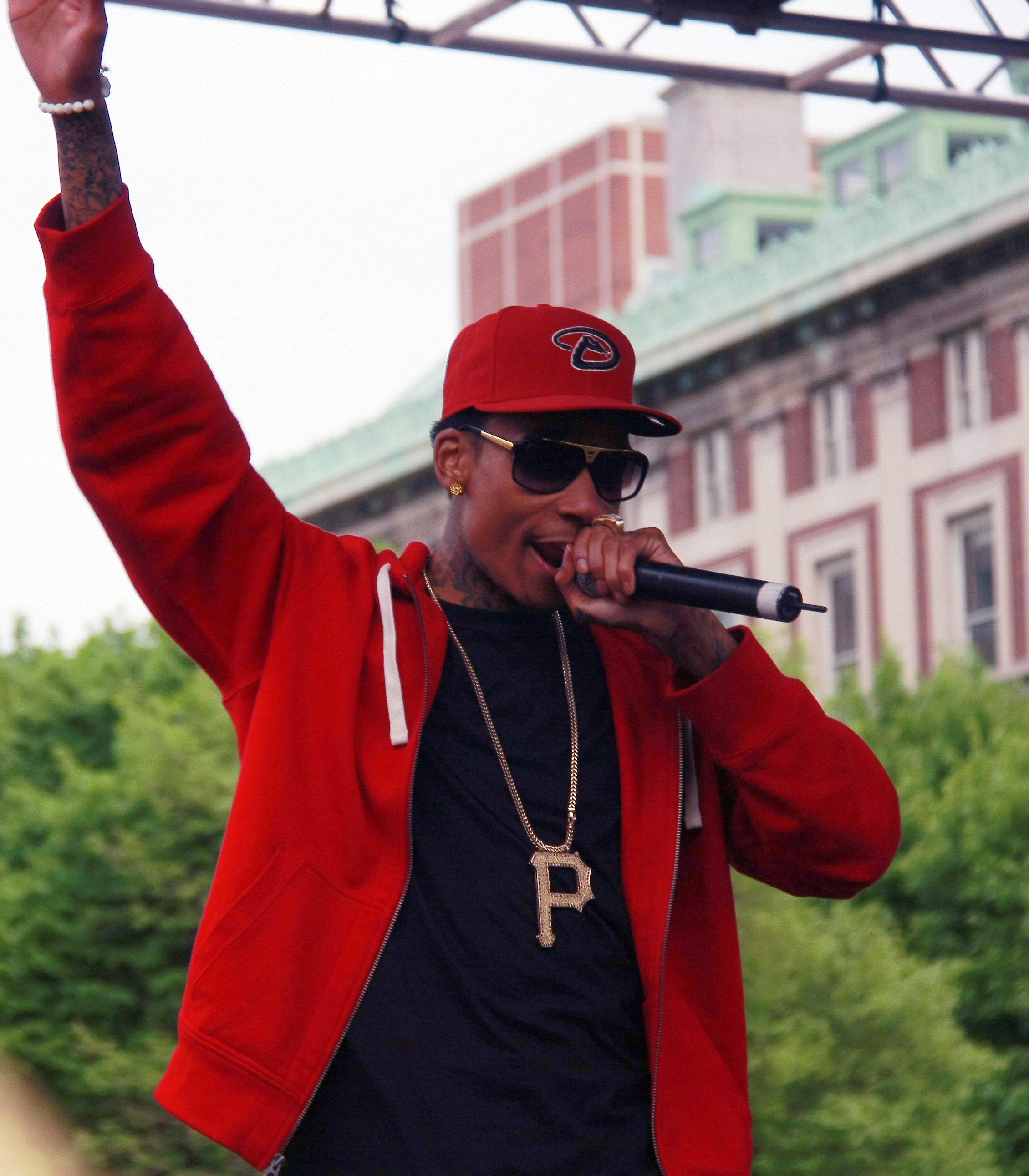
Wiz Khalifa founded the label in 2008

The Taylor Gang was originally coined in 2006 to refer to "Taylors" who are supporters of Wiz Khalifa. Taylor Gang Ent. was co-founded in 2008 by Khalifa. The record label was named after Khalifa's alma mater, Taylor Allderdice High School, and his affinity for Converse Chuck Taylor All-Star sneakers and Taylor Mitchell. Taylor Gang Ent. began as Khalifa's fan base network, street team and home to his crew. The entity later became a full entertainment company encompassing record label, management services, production and film companies. Chevy Woods, Berner, and Tuki Carter all signed to the record label in 2011. In December 2012, Juicy J joined the entertainment company. In 2013, Ty Dolla $ign joined the company as well. In 2014, J.R. Donato signed to the label. That year, Taylor Gang Records selected INgrooves to manage their global distribution and marketing.

The record label assembled a super group and released their album in 2016.

Taylor Gang Ent. partnered with brands to create licensing deals, most notably, Grenco Science in 2014 for a series of vaporizer products and Neff to produce a special 26-piece apparel collection composed of T-shirts, jerseys and hats. The creative collaboration among the label's artists and Neff.

== Notable artists ==
=== Current ===
- Berner
- Chevy Woods
- DJ Bonics (Wiz Khalifa's DJ)
- Juicy J
- Young Deji
- Fedd The God
- Fendi Jae
- Ricky P
- RMB Justize
- Sledgren (jointly Trippy Music and E1)
- TM88 (Producer)
- Ty Dolla Sign
- Wiz Khalifa
- JasonMartin

=== Former ===
- Cardo Got Wings
- LoLa Monroe
- Jimmy Wopo (Deceased)

== TGOD Mafia ==
TGOD Mafia
- Genre: Hip-hop
- Years active: 2016–present
- Labels: Taylor Gang; Empire
- Members: Wiz Khalifa; Juicy J Ty Dolla Sign; TM88

TGOD (Taylor Gang or Die) Mafia is an American hip-hop supergroup composed of Taylor Gang Entertainment signees. Their debut project, TGOD Mafia: Rude Awakening (2016), peaked at number 26 on the Billboard 200 and was produced entirely by TM88.
