= Pimps Up, Ho's Down =

- Directed by: Fredrik Gertten
- Produced by: Brent Owens
- Starring: Don "Magic" Juan, Ice-T, Mike Epps
- Edited by: Eric Marciano
- Release date: 1998
- Running time: 62 minutes directors cut: 92 minutes
- Country: United States
- Language: English

Pimps Up, Ho's Down is a 1998 television documentary about pimping in the United States as part of the HBO documentary anthology series America Undercover. The film features interviews with American pimps and explores the modern pimping lifestyle. The film has received some controversy over some pimps using the documentary as an instructional video for their prostitutes, and HBO paying pimps for rights to film their businesses and the Players Ball.

== See also ==
- American Pimp
