= Players Ball =

Annual gathering of pimps in the United States of America

The Players' Ball
- Date: Annual since 1974
- Location: Oakland, California
- Organised by: Bishop Don "Magic" Juan
- Participants: Pimps, Players, Prostitutes, Madames, Brothel Managers, Musicians, Film Makers, Jewelers, Rappers

The Players Ball is an annual gathering of pimps, players, madams, prostitutes and celebrated figures, each one held in a different American city each year, but it originated in Oakland, California. Other Players Balls take place across the country, most notably in Miami and Atlanta. Presently, there are "Players Ball" events in Las Vegas and Memphis, Tennessee. On December 16-18th 2011, a Players Ball was hosted in Hollywood, California.

== History ==
The idea stemmed from a scene in the 1973 blaxploitation film The Mack in which the lead character, a pimp named Goldie, attends The Players Ball in Oakland, California. Comedian Dan Aykroyd parodied this event in his film Doctor Detroit. Keenen Ivory Wayans satirized the ball in his 1988 film I'm Gonna Git You Sucka, in which blaxploitation icon Antonio Fargas plays a character who is crowned "Pimp of the Year" after winning a Miss America-style pageant. Dave Chappelle satirized the event with "The Playa Haters' Ball" on an episode of Chappelle's Show. The party has been a November tradition since 1974, when pimps from across the country gathered to celebrate the birthday of Don Juan now known as Bishop Don "Magic" Juan. Every year, the award for "Pimp of the Year" is given out. Juan was the winner 13 years in a row.

=== Official Bishop Don Juan Players Ball ===
The 35th Anniversary of the Players Ball was held on Saturday, December 5, 2009, at Chez Roues Banquet Hall in Chicago. Ditch performed his first Players Ball show there.

The 38th annual official Players Ball 2012 was held Saturday December 8, 2012 at the Key Club, Hollywood, California. Nick Cannon was the DJ for the event, and was rumored to be in production filming a movie about Bishop Don Juan.

== Documentaries ==
The Player's Ball was shown in the HBO documentary Pimps Up, Ho's Down and the Hughes Brothers' documentary, American Pimp.

A DVD entitled Master Players Ball was also released in 2006. The DVD featured live scenes from a "Players Ball."

== Controversies ==
=== 2003 arrests ===
In 2003, the Players Ball took place in Atlanta, Georgia. A survivor by the name of "Tina F." reported that several pimps were arrested for having underage prostitutes, and claimed "Two years ago in Atlanta, they stopped it and arrested 15 pimps and charged them. One pimp had a 10-year-old girl in his stable."

=== 2005 protest ===
In 2005, a survivor identifying herself as "Brenda Myers-Powell" protested the Players Ball event at Mariella's Banquet Hall on 5th Avenue in Maywood, Illinois. Brenda called the event a "ball for child molesters" because she began being trafficked by pimps at the age of 14 and says her experience is a common one.

=== Matthew Thompkins indictment ===
In 2006, Matthew Thompkins, a former postal worker of Manhattanville, New York, was indicted. He was a former "Pimp of the Year" of the annual Players Ball. His aliases included "Knowledge" and "Daddy." While searching his property, police found two "Pimp of the Year" awards.

== Other versions ==
=== Las Vegas, Nevada ===
A well-known non-pimp Players Ball, started in 1999, was thrown in Las Vegas and New Orleans as a private party for businesses attending adult-oriented events. The event is organized by D-Money. The event was thrown twice a year and may coincide with other adult events such as AVN or Internext Expo. The last Players Ball event thrown by D-Money, who has officially ended the events, was on April 10, 2019.

=== Memphis, Tennessee ===
In 2011, the annual Memphis Players Ball was also attended by Bishop Don Magic Juan, Good Game, MattShizzle, Candyman, The Black Heff and others. Ditch performed at the Memphis Ball which was located at a mansion in Memphis, Tennessee.

Past events have featured performers including:

- 50 Cent
- Snoop Dogg
- Ice Cube
- Lil Jon
- E-40
- Digital Underground
- Ice-T
- Cypress Hill
- Too Short
- George Clinton & P-Funk
- Slick Rick
- Doug E Fresh
- Fishbone
- Ron Jeremy
- YTCracker
- Afro Man
- Flavor Flav
- Wiz Khalifa
