= Tom Scott and The L.A. Express =

Studio album by Tom Scott and The L.A. Express
- Released: 1974
- Recorded: August–September 1973
- Genre: Jazz fusion
- Length: 41:50
- Label: Ode
- Producer: Tom Scott

Tom Scott and The L.A. Express chronology
Tom Scott and The L.A. Express (1974)	Tom Cat (1975)

Professional ratings
Review scores
Source	Rating
Allmusic	4/5 stars

Tom Scott and The L.A. Express is a Jazz/Fusion album released in 1974 by Tom Scott backed by the L.A. Express.

== Track listing ==
1. "Bless My Soul" (Scott, Sample, Guerin, Carlton, Bennett) - 4:09
2. "Sneakin' in the Back" (Scott, Sample, Guerin, Carlton, Bennett) - 4:33
3. "King Cobra" (Scott) - 4:23
4. "Dahomey Dance" (Coltrane) - 3:43
5. "Nunya" (Bennett) - 3:40
6. "Easy Life" (Scott) - 3:01
7. "Spindrift" (Scott) - 5:44
8. "Strut Your Stuff" (Scott) - 3:37
9. "L.A. Expression" (Bennett) - 6:23
10. "Vertigo" (Bennett) - 2:30

== Personnel ==
Tom Scott and The L.A. Express

- Tom Scott - horns, woodwinds, producer
- Larry Carlton - guitar
- Max Bennett - bass
- Joe Sample - piano, keyboards
- John Guerin - drums, percussion

Technical

- Hank Cicalo - recording, mixing
- Chuck Beeson - art direction
- Joe Garnett - patch and buckle design
- Jim McCrary - photography

== Later samples ==
- "Sneakin' in the Back"
  - "Justify My Love (Hip Hop Mix)" by Madonna (1990)
  - "Blue Lines" by Massive Attack from the album Blue Lines (1991)
  - "I Won't Give Up" by Deee-Lite from the album Infinity Within (1992)
  - "Souljah's Story" by 2Pac from the album 2Pacalypse Now (1991)
  - "Soul by the Pound" by Common Sense from the album Can I Borrow a Dollar? (1992)
  - "Dieu Reconnaîtra Les Siens" by DJ Cam from the album Underground Vibes (1994)
  - "Edge of Blue" by DJ Krush from the album Krush (1994)
  - "Something Wicked This Way Comes" by Barry Adamson from the album Oedipus Schmoedipus (1996)
  - "Bells of War" by Wu-Tang Clan from the album Wu-Tang Forever (1997)
  - "Love No Hoe (demo)" by The Notorious B.I.G. from the album Notorious: Original Motion Picture Soundtrack (2009)
  - "Life Is Just A Ride" by Jenova 7 from the album Dusted Jazz Volume One (2011)
  - "Young, Wild & Free" by Snoop Dogg and Wiz Khalifa from the album Mac & Devin Go to High School (2012)
- "Strut Your Stuff"
  - "Taking What's Not Yours" by TV Girl from the album Who Really Cares (2016)
