= American Pimp =

1999 film

- Theatrical release poster
- Directed by: The Hughes Brothers
- Produced by: Albert Hughes; Allen Hughes; Kevin J. Messick
- Cinematography: Albert Hughes
- Edited by: Doug Pray
- Distributed by: Seventh Art Releasing
- Release date: 1999
- Running time: 87 minutes
- Country: United States
- Language: English

American Pimp is a 1999 documentary that examines the pimp subculture in the United States. It was directed by the Hughes Brothers, the filmmakers behind Menace II Society and Dead Presidents.

The documentary consists of first person interviews of people involved in the pimping lifestyle ("the game"). The interviews are separated by short clips from 1970s blaxploitation films such as Willie Dynamite, The Mack, and Dolemite.

The first portion of the documentary focuses on pimps working illegally. The illegal pimps that are interviewed are from all over the United States, e.g., Charm from Hawaii, Fillmore Slim from San Francisco, and Payroll from Las Vegas. These pimps, and many others, discuss their theories on the history of prostitution. The pimps go on to talk about their philosophy on pimping and how they live their daily lives.

The film also discusses the legal sector of prostitution. The film also interviewed Dennis Hof, the owner of the Bunny Ranch in Nevada. He feels that Nevada is much smarter than the other states because they have imposed the proper health and background checks on prostitution, instead of trying to suppress prostitution by making it illegal.

The majority of the documentary glorifies the pimping lifestyle. The pimps and prostitutes interviewed mainly discuss the perks of the lifestyle. They talk about the money they have made and the expensive suits and cars they were able to buy. However, near the end of the film, the interviews involve prostitutes who have died from the lifestyle as well as pimps who have retired and hold straight jobs or those who are now in jail.

== Interviews ==
- Rosebudd (real name: John S. Dickson)
- Fillmore Slim (real name: Clarence Sims)
- Gorgeous Dre (real name: Andre Taylor)
- Mel Taylor
- Danny Brown
- Ken Red (real name: Louis Kenneth Wright)
- Payroll
- Schauntté Parker
- Charm
- Latrice
- Jade
- Sir Captain
- Bradley
- Payroll (Lorence Hammond)
- Too Short
- Mr. Ivy (also known as Pimpin' Ken)
- Bishop Don "Magic" Juan
- R.P.
- Dennis Hof
- C-Note
- Caleb Devine (real name: Caleb Benn)

== Reception ==
On the review aggregator website Rotten Tomatoes, 55% of 22 critics' reviews are positive. Metacritic, which uses a weighted average, assigned the film a score of 59 out of 100, based on 19 critics, indicating "mixed or average" reviews.

== TV adaptation ==
In a 2009 HBO drama series called Gentlemen of Leisure, The Hughes brothers planned to revisit the themes of American Pimp. Gentlemen of Leisure was to investigate the world of prostitution in Oakland, California, with an emphasis on a 35-year-old notorious pimp and his attempts to leave the business. However, before filming began, the show was slammed by then-Oakland Mayor Ron Dellums and other city leaders who were concerned about the show's impact on Oakland's image.

Dellums' Chief of Staff, David Chai, said, "It is the mayor's view that this project goes against our vision of Oakland as a 'model city' and does a disservice to residents and visitors alike", and "while the mayor understands that there are certain benefits to having a major film project in our city, he is not willing to support this project at this time. The people of Oakland have come too far to have our city's name trampled upon in the name of entertainment."

== See also ==
- Pimps Up, Ho's Down
- Players Ball
