= Don "Magic" Juan =

American hip hop personality, actor, fashion designer and former pimp

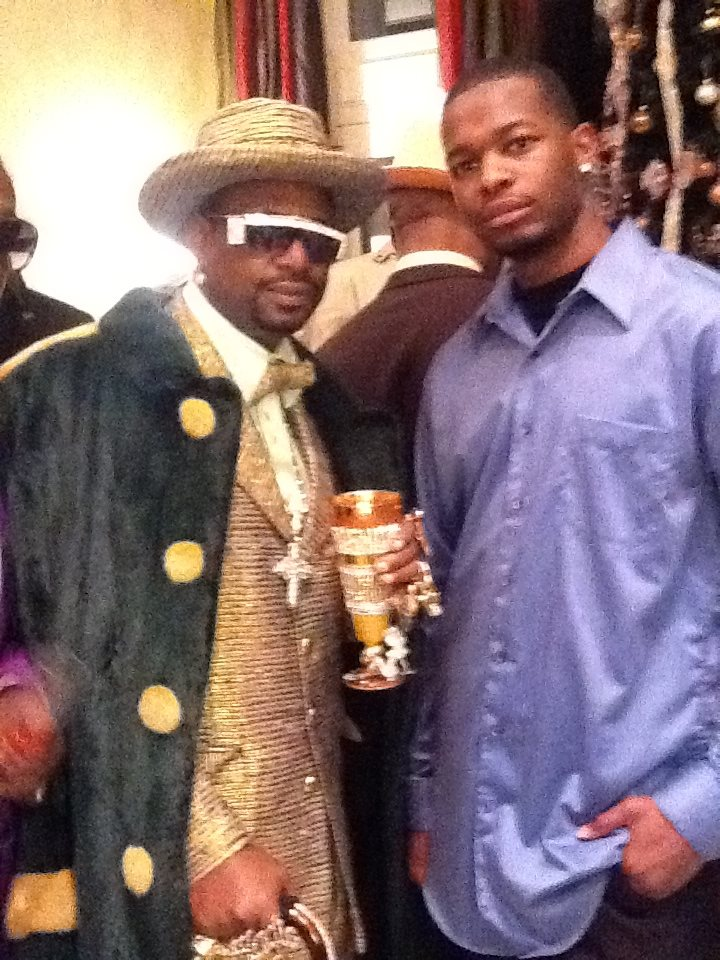
- Bishop Don Juan (left) with Antonio James at the Players Ball, 2013.

Background information
- Born: Donald Campbell; November 30, 1950 (age 75); Chicago, Illinois, U.S.
- Years active: 1971–present
- Label: Avatar

Don "Magic" Juan, (born Donald Campbell November 30, 1950, also known as The Chairman of the Board, Archbishop Don 'Da Magic' Juan, Bishop Don Magic Juan, or just Bishop) is an American preacher, hip hop personality, actor, fashion designer and former pimp, from Chicago. He is also the founder of the Players Ball, an annual celebration of his former "pimp" lifestyle.

== Career ==
=== Pimp ===
Regarding his career as a pimp, Campbell noted, "I'd see a pimp, so I'd pattern myself after that. I'd read Iceberg Slim. I'd watch Superfly, with the flashy cars and clothes. I went for all of that. When I came to the game I was 16." During the 1970s, Campbell operated a record store that doubled as a "turn out joint" to recruit additional sex workers.

=== Church minister ===
In an interview with Joan Rivers, Bishop Don Magic Juan admitted that while smoking PCP, he realized that he should dedicate his life to God. In 1985, Campbell ceased operating as a pimp, stating, "God don't want me to do it no more...[i]t was like something grabbed my heart to convince me." He was later ordained as a minister by F. L. Johnson of the Christian Ministers Congress Non-Denominational Council, Inc., and in 1989, he opened the Magic World Christian Kingdom Church of the Royal Family.

=== Celebrity ===
Juan's climb to mainstream celebrity began when he met Snoop Dogg backstage at the Soul Train awards. They soon became good friends, and Juan became Snoop's "spiritual advisor". He also acts as a "spiritual advisor" to Gina Gershon as seen in an episode of the documentary series Rocked with Gina Gershon. In 2003, Snoop Dogg stated that he was working on producing Juan's first album and Juan did release a compilation album of '70s and '80s soul classics in 2006, titled Green is for the Money, Gold is for the Honeys.

Juan has had several supporting roles in music, videos, and live stage shows of established rap artists, including an appearance in the B-Real music video "Los Angeles" directed by Hugo V., a remix of 50 Cent's "P.I.M.P.", (as well as being featured in the music video), and a spoken-word interlude on Da Brat's album Unrestricted. He is also featured in Twista's song "Pimp On" from the Kamikaze album, and "Bo$$ Playa" from Snoop Dogg's album Paid tha Cost to Be da Boss. Juan can also be seen as part of Snoop's entourage in movies such as Starsky & Hutch and Old School. His TV appearances include the Ice-T episode of Behind the Music, Girls Next Door, The Daily Show, Rob and Big, Viva La Bam, Pimps Up, Ho's Down, a documentary about the pimping lifestyle, and the Hughes Brothers-directed documentary American Pimp.

Juan was caricatured in Aaron McGruder's comic strip The Boondocks for a November–December 2003 story arc during which Boondocks characters Huey and Caesar were attempting to find then-U.S. National Security Advisor Condoleezza Rice a boyfriend. He also had a small role as a pimp associated to the character Money Mike, played by Katt Williams, in the film Friday After Next starring Ice Cube. Juan made a brief appearance on the first episode of Mind of Mencia. In 2007, Juan was honored with his own colorway of the McNally skateboard shoe by Emerica.

Juan has appeared in Rugged Entertainment's Kiss and Tail: The Hollywood Jumpoff, directed by Thomas Gibson and produced by Peter Spirer. The film was featured on Showtime. He also appeared in the television show American Gangster during the episode about Willie Lloyd and the Vice Lords, and he has been a guest on Manswers.

He is featured on the 2011 song "Talent Show" by Snoop Dogg and Wiz Khalifa from their joint album Mac & Devin Go to High School.

== Discography ==
=== Albums ===
- 2006: Green is for the Money, Gold is for the Honeys Vol. 1 (Avatar Records)

=== Guest appearances ===
Year	Song	Artist	Album
1999	"Pimpin' Ain't Easy"	Rappin' 4-Tay	Introduction to Mackin'
2000	"A Word From ... Da Bishop Don "Magic" Juan"	Da Brat	Unrestricted
2000	"It' Ain't Easy"	Mddl Fngz	Live! From Da Manjah
2002	"Boss Playa"	Snoop Dogg	Paid tha Cost to Be da Boss
2003	"A.D.I.D.A.C."	Snoop Dogg	Welcome 2 Tha Chuuch vol. 1
2003	"P.I.M.P"	50 Cent	Get Rich or Die Tryin
2003	"P.I.M.P. Remix"	50 Cent	P.I.M.P. - Single
2004	"Pimp On"	Twista	Kamikaze
2004	"Church"	Pomona City Rydaz	Walking Game
2004	"Nuthin' Without Me"	Snoop Dogg	Welcome To Tha Chuuch vol. 4: Sunday School
2006	"Que Te Pica Remix"	Notch	Raised By The People
2007	"Musika"	KRS-One & Marley Marl	Hip Hop Lives
2007	"Intro (Blessin')"	Bankroll Jonez	UGK Records & Get Money Movement Presents Scroll Muzik
2007	"Ballin On The West Side"	Ditch	Public Intoxication
2007	"Rob & Big"	MTV	Bobby Light
2008	"A Pimp’s Christmas Song"	Snoop Dogg	Snoop Dogg Presents Christmas In Tha Dogg House

== Filmography ==
=== Film ===
- 2012: Mac & Devin Go to High School - Student Services Guy
- 2007: Redrum - Devil
- 2005: Boss'n Up - Himself
- 2003: Old School - Himself
- 2004: Starsky & Hutch - Himself
- 2003: S.W.A.T - Himself
- 2002: Friday After Next - Himself
- 2001: Deadly Rhapsody - Club MC
- 1999: American Pimp - Himself
- 1998: Pimps Up, Ho's Down - Himself
- 1996: Original Gangstas - Big Brother (uncredited)

=== Television ===
- 2015: Black-ish - Bishop Don Juan
- 2006: Flavor of Love - Season 2, Episode 5 - Bishop Don "Magic" Juan
- 2004: Eve - Comfort
- 2004: MADtv - Bishop 'Rump Shaker' Robinson
- 2004: Viva La Bam - Bishop Don Juan
