= Shelly Liebowitz =

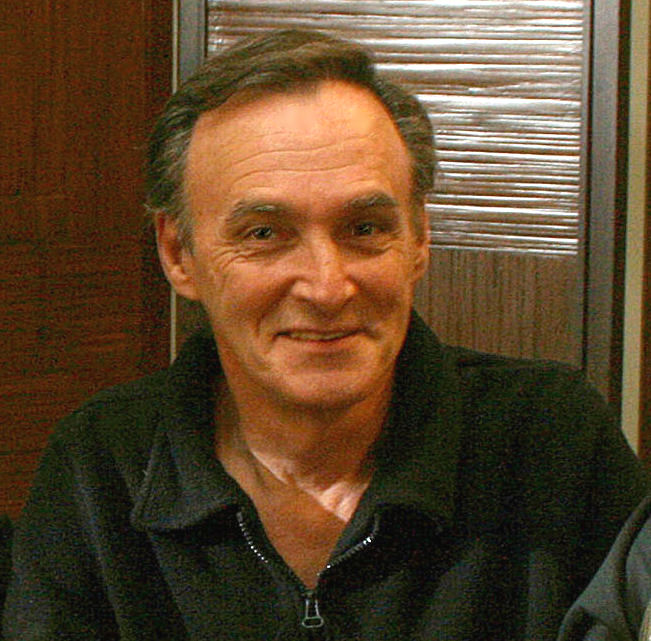
Shelly Liebowitz

Shelly Liebowitz (February 2, 1946 – March 12, 2019) was an American record executive, promoter, producer, and manager. He was the CEO of SRI Label Group, a Los Angeles-based, independent record company that specializes in modern and classic jazz, blues, country and rock. In his career as a producer and promoter, he worked with artists ranging from Sammy Davis Jr. to John Lennon. He licensed recordings worldwide, and worked as a consultant to several major music labels.

== Early career ==
As a teenager in the early 1960s, Liebowitz was enrolled in The Juilliard School. While studying at Juilliard, he had the opportunity to attend his first recording session. It was soon after that he decided to leave the school to watch and learn hands-on the recording process under top artists and producers. Initially drawn to the industry through performing, he joined a local New York City act called The Phantoms on guitar & vocals. Though the group had a strong local following, he realized after a time that his strength and desire was not in performing. Deciding to pursue a career in the business side of recording, he took on jobs in the promotion department for several labels, including Canadian American & Roulette, working his way up to the A&R department while learning everything he could about the industry.

== Major labels (late 1960s-1980) ==
At Roulette he began a working relationship with Count Basie, who introduced him in turn to Sammy Davis Jr., an artist who, along with his partners in The Rat Pack, (Frank Sinatra & Dean Martin) Liebowitz would work with through his lifetime. Basie also introduced him to Ella Fitzgerald, with whom Liebowitz would collaborate on several projects. By the 1970s he was moving heavily into production, working with top acts in the jazz and rock worlds, including Miles Davis, the Rolling Stones, Frankie Avalon, and more. In 1978 he was appointed vice-president of East Coast Operations for Capitol Productions, a management company that represented more than 100 singers, musical groups, songwriters and actors. In this time he also wrote and produced two television pilots for NBC: "Anything Goes" and "Just for Laughs"; neither was picked up. Towards the end of the decade he worked with Harry Nilsson and John Lennon on personal and professional projects, before deciding to leave the big recording companies and create an independent label of his own.

== Independent (1980-present) ==
In 1980 he left Capitol and formed Belvedere Records, a small independent label focused on rock and country music. The label included several artists carried over from Capitol, along with some new discoveries. In addition to his role as president, he also produced recordings, directed music videos and started a music publishing company division to develop young songwriters. In the early 1980s he donated his services to the Black Music Association to put on two tribute shows at Radio City Music Hall: “To Basie with Love” (1982) and “Miles Ahead” (1983.) Conceived as tributes to Count Basie and Miles Davis respectively, the shows also raised money for the BMA's musical scholarship fund. These were the first of many benefit concerts staged in and around the New York area. In the mid-1980s he sold Belvedere to focus on productions – shows, records, and concerts – and managing talent.

In 1986 he moved to Florida and formed Creative Media, a company with talent management, video, advertising and production divisions. In the following years he signed new talent such as The Johnson Boys, Darrell Chambers, Kim Hoyer, and Da Boyz.

It was during this time that Liebowitz produced a benefit concert for the Artificial Reef Foundation called “The Coconuts Festival”. In the aftermath of 1992's Hurricane Andrew, Liebowitz co-produced a music video for the Florida Hurricane Relief Fund featuring a rendition of “You’ll Never Walk Alone” by one of his recording artists, Darrell Chambers. The filming took place the day after the hurricane in the most devastated areas, with the aid of the Governor's office. It aired within 24 hours of being filmed and helped to raise nearly $4 million in relief funds.

In 1996, he took on work as a consultant for The International Jazz Hall of Fame, and assisted in arrangements for host Steve Allen, along with several presenters and sponsors for the IJHF's Inductions Ceremonies.

In 1998, Liebowitz moved to Southern California. There, he acted for a short time as a consultant before founding SRI Records in 1999. He was the executive producer of "Judy, Frank & Dean," which aired as part of a pledge drive special nationally for PBS Television stations. This special starred Judy Garland, Frank Sinatra and Dean Martin.

== Later projects ==
Liebowitz was vocal in his criticism of the modern recording industry, specifically the focus on short-term contracts and lack of artist development. He has also criticized self-publishing artists for the same reason, advocating small independent labels as the best avenue for developing great talent.

A recording project, Friends and Family, was a duets recording with Ray Brown Jr., the son of Ella Fitzgerald and Ray Brown, and was released in September 2008. It featured duets with artists Jane Monheit, Melba Moore, James Moody, Maria Muldaur, Dr. John, Dionne Warwick, Freda Payne, Sophie B. Hawkins, Paul Williams, Dr. Lonnie Smith, Dave Somerville, Sally Kellerman, Kim Hoyer, Ella and Haylee Fitzgerald.

In 2011, it was announced that he was acting as executive producer on the film, The Legend of Fillmore Slim, a biopic of the San Francisco blues legend. Rapper Snoop Dogg was slated to play the title role. Liebowitz was also working on Legs, a television pilot with six completed feature-length scripts, as well as a theatrical production, The Rock and Roll Bus, set on the tour bus of the first integrated rock tour in 1957.

Liebowitz was director of music and arts for Swipe 4 the Kids, a partnership with electronic payment program Eclypse Solutions in which they forward a percentage of their merchants' fee to youth enrichment programs at local schools.

In 2017, Liebowitz wrote and provided photos for Doing It On The Downbeat: A Pictorial View Of My Life In Music. The 52 page hard-cover book revealed his early introduction to his music career and contained photos dating from early jazz and blues artists, to famous songwriters, rock and country artists spanning his more than 50 years in the industry. Photos include those of Bob Dylan, Van Morrison, Johnny Cash, Jim Morrison, Etta James, Miles Davis and many more rare photos from his collection.

== Death ==
Liebowitz died in March 2019, in Thousand Oaks, California, at the age of 73.
