= Young, Wild & Free =

2011 single by Snoop Dogg and Wiz Khalifa featuring Bruno Mars

Single by Snoop Dogg and Wiz Khalifa featuring Bruno Mars

from the album Mac & Devin Go to High School
- Released: October 11, 2011
- Genre: Pop-rap
- Length: 3:27
- Label: Atlantic; Rostrum
- Songwriters: Calvin Broadus; Cameron Thomaz; Peter Hernandez; Philip Lawrence; Ari Levine; Cristopher Brown; Ted Bluechel; Marlon Barrow; Tyrone Griffin; Keenon Jackson; Nye Lee; Marquise Newman; Max Bennett; Larry Carlton; John Guerin; Joe Sample; Tom Scott
- Producer: The Smeezingtons

Snoop Dogg singles chronology
"The Mack" (2011)	"Young, Wild & Free" (2011)	"I Drink I Smoke" (2011)

Wiz Khalifa singles chronology
"5 O'Clock" (2011)	"Young, Wild & Free" (2011)	"I'm On" (2011)

Bruno Mars singles chronology
"It Will Rain" (2011)	"Young, Wild & Free" (2011)	"Count On Me" (2011)

Music video
- "Young, Wild & Free on YouTube

"Young, Wild & Free" is a song by American rappers Snoop Dogg and Wiz Khalifa, featuring vocals from American singer-songwriter Bruno Mars. It was released on October 11, 2011, by Atlantic Records as the lead single from the soundtrack of the film, Mac & Devin Go to High School, in which the rappers star in. The track was written by Mars, Philip Lawrence, Ari Levine, Brody Brown, Snoop Dogg, and Wiz Khalifa. The track samples two other songs, "Toot It & Boot It" (2010) and "Sneakin' in the Back" (1974), songwriting credits were added for a total of seventeen. Produced by the Smeezingtons during a freestyle studio session and never meant to be heard; Aaron Bay-Shuck considered it a potential hit and asked the trio to finish it. After the song was finished, Snoop Dogg and Wiz Khalifa were added.

"Young, Wild & Free" received mixed reviews from music critics, who praised it for standing out stylistically from the rest of the soundtrack with hip-hop drums and a piano hook. Some critics praised Mars's pop-nostalgia chorus and Snoop Dogg's rap but criticized Wiz Khalifa's rap performance due to being too rough. It was commercially successful, reaching the top ten in several markets (including number seven on the Billboard Hot 100 and number six in France and Switzerland); it peaked at number two in New Zealand and number four in Australia. The single was certified six times platinum by the Recording Industry Association of America (RIAA), five times platinum by the Australian Recording Industry Association (ARIA) and by Recorded Music NZ (RMNZ).

The accompanying music video, filmed in Montclair, California in October 2011, was directed by Dylan Brown. It features Snoop Dogg and Wiz Khalifa having fun driving karts, skateboarding, and surrounded by girls at a party, interspersed with footage from Mac & Devin Go to High School. "Young, Wild & Free" was performed live several times, including on the 2012 VMA Tour and at Coachella 2012. It was also part of the 2015 Boys of Zummer (the American leg of Khalifa's tour with Fall Out Boy), Dogg's 2016 Puff Puff Pass Tour Part 2, and two collaborative tours by Snoop Dogg and Wiz Khalifa: the 2011 High School Tour and the 2016 High Road Summer Tour. The song was nominated for Best Rap Song at the 55th Annual Grammy Awards in 2013.

== Background and release ==
During an interview in the music magazine American Songwriter, Philip Lawrence said that "Young, Wild & Free" was "an after-thought" and "there's a lot of fun behind it". The song began when the Smeezingtons were experimenting in the studio, a process which usually starts when they get behind the mic and singing "until something sticks". Although the team thought "it was just a little something" which would never be heard, Aaron Bay-Shuck told them the song was a "smash" and they had to finish it. Mars later forwarded the song to Snoop Dogg. Wiz Khalifa revealed in a 2023 interview that, when Atlantic Records presented the song to him, he did not like it, but was later convinced by Snoop Dogg to record the track with him. They decided to record and returned it to Mars, who added finishing touches.

"Young, Wild & Free" was first released on October 11, 2011, by Rostrum and Atlantic Records in various countries via digital download. A clean version of the song was issued in various countries on October 21, 2011. On November 25, the single was sent for radio airplay in Italy by Warner Music Group. On December 4, 2011, the single was issued digitally in the United Kingdom. On February 2, 2012, a CD single was released with its accompanying music video in Germany, Austria and Switzerland.

== Composition and production ==
"Young, Wild & Free"
A 19-second sample, in which Mars sings over hip-hop drums and a chilled piano hook during the nostalgic chorus.

"Young, Wild & Free" is a pop-rap song, composed in the key of D major with a tempo of 95 beats per minute. It differs from the G-funk style of other songs on the soundtrack, incorporating pop elements into the chorus. The song consists of hip-hop drums overlaid with a revolving, chilled "twinkling" piano hook and Mars's "sprightly" and "carefree choral hook". Its "carefree vibes" make the single "the perfect soundtrack for a Friday night with friends". Coughing is heard, implying a party vibe. The song is a weed anthem, reminiscing "hazy times" and youth: "It's like I'm 17 again/ Peach fuzz on my face/Lookin', on the case /Trying to get a hella taste", while the former in the following verses "Roll joints bigger than King Kong's fingers/ And smoke them hoes down until they're stingers." Mars's pop-soul chorus is also nostalgic: "So what, we get drunk/So what, we smoke weed/We’re just having fun/We don't care who sees/So what, we go out/That's how it's supposed to be/Living young and wild and free."

"Young, Wild & Free" was initially written by the artists alongside Lawrence, Ari Levine, and Brody Brown. Since it sampled "Toot It & Boot It" (2010) by American rapper YG and American singer Ty Dolla Sign, they received writing credits with Nye Lee, Marlon Borrow and Marquise Newman (who did additional writing). "Toot It & Boot It" had sampled "Songs in the Wind" by The Association (written by Ted Bluechel) from their 1966 album Renaissance, so Bluechel was added as a songwriter. "Young, Wild & Free"'s drum loop sampled "Sneakin' in the Back", from the 1974 album Tom Scott and The L.A. Express, and the song was re-registered with additional writing credits for Max Bennett, Larry Carlton, John Guerin, Joe Sample, and Tom Scott. The single was produced by Mars, Lawrence and Levine under their stage name, the Smeezingtons, and was engineered by Levine, Andy Drucker and Travis "Shaggy" Marshall at Levcon Studios and Paramount Recording Studios in Los Angeles and DSR in Hollywood. Levine mixed the track at Levcon Studios. It was mastered by Chris Gehringer at Sterling Sound, NYC.

== Critical reception and accolades ==
The song received mixed reviews from most music critics. For Entertainment Weekly, Kyle Anderson praised its "sweet" Mars' hook; with "'song of summer' written all over it", it "could have been a graduation anthem for stoners everywhere" if it was released in May. MTV's Jenna Rubenstein gave the song a generally-positive review as more than a "reckless party jam"; the three singers are not bothered by the judgments of others, and "that's the positive, family-friendly message we're taking". Billboard magazine gave it three-and-a-half out of five stars, calling it "a haze of nostalgia". The review praised Snoop Dogg's effortless flow, but called Wiz Khalifa's delivery "forceful" and "punchy"; it "gets on top of the beat and harshes the mellow laid-back production." In a similar review, Lewis Corner of Digital Spy praised Dogg's verses and called the single "cool and addictive"; however, he found the song's "flavor" short-lived. In a negative review, Shea Serrano of LA Weekly compared the track's atmosphere to the "inside of a cloud (smoke), a celebration or idea of what some teenagers who smoke pot would like". Serrano noted, ironically, that the song's performers were neither young, wild nor free.

On AllMusic, David Jeffries wrote that "Young, Wild & Free" had a more contemporary, friendly sound that the rest of the album; the single is "polished, bright and sunshine material". In another album review, Michael Madden of Consequence of Sound considered it one of the few songs good enough for a soundtrack due to the "smooth pop vocals of Bruno Mars and glitzy Hollywood production". The A.V. Club's Chris Martins praised the single's "sharp keys and lite Jackson 5 bounce" in comparison with the other, G-Funk songs on the soundtrack. The song was nominated for Best Rap Song at the 2013 Grammy Awards and was one of the winners of Most Performed Songs at the 2013 ASCAP Pop Music Awards. According to a Billboard list measuring a song's "inebriated energy on a scale of one (mildly buzzed) to 10 (totally stoned)", "Young, Wild & Free" received a seven; according to the Billboard staff, it could be appreciated by "serious stoners" and anyone else because of its playfulness. In a similar list compiled by David Opie, writing for Highsnobiety, he ranked the song among "The 10 Most Essential Rap Songs About Weed".

== Commercial performance ==
"Young, Wild & Free" debuted at number 10 on the Billboard Hot 100 in the United States, selling 159,000 digital copies and peaking at number seven. It topped the Billboard Rhythmic Top 40 chart for three weeks, and peaked at number four on the Hot Rap Songs chart. The song peaked at number 10 in the US Billboard Mainstream Top 40, and was number 32 on the Billboard Hot 100-year-end ranking. In Canada, "Young, Wild & Free" peaked at number 13 on the Canadian Hot 100. It was certified six times platinum by the Recording Industry Association of America (RIAA), and triple platinum by Music Canada (MC). By September 2012, the song had sold 3,211,000 digital units.

In Europe, "Young, Wild & Free" reached the top 10 of several countries. It entered the French chart at number 50 in early November 2011, peaking at number six and spending 48 weeks on the chart. The song entered Norway's VG-lista chart in early 2012 at number 20. It spent 12 weeks on the chart, peaking at number six in its third week. The single peaked at number six in its tenth week on the Swiss Hitparade, leaving the chart 26 weeks later. "Young, Wild & Free" peaked at number nine and spent 17 weeks on the Flanders Ultratop 50 chart. It was certified gold, with the same number of sold copies (15,000) in both countries, by IFPI Switzerland and the Belgian Entertainment Association (BEA). On January 14, 2012, the song peaked at number seven in its eighth week on the Dutch Top 40. In Italy, it peaked at number five and was certified three times platinum by Federazione Industria Musicale Italiana (FIMI).

"Young, Wild & Free" debuted on the Australian Singles Chart at number 17, and entered the top ten in its sixth week on the chart at number five. The following two weeks (in early January 2012), it peaked at number four. The song was certified five times platinum by the Australian Recording Industry Association (ARIA). In New Zealand, it debuted at number 21 and rose to number 11 the following week before peaking at number two for three consecutive weeks. The song spent nine weeks in the top ten, and was certified six times platinum by Recorded Music NZ (RMNZ).

== Music video ==
The music video for "Young, Wild & Free" was filmed on October 19, 2011, at the Mission Tiki Drive-in Theater in Montclair, California. It was directed by Dylan Brown (who also directed Mac & Devin Go to High School), and was produced by Lucy Brown for the Yard Company. Snoop Dogg told MTV that the video is about "the celebration of being young, wild, and free – having a good time". In the behind-the-scenes video, Wiz Khalifa and Dogg were having fun "driving go-karts, spinning through a zorb, and sliding down a Slip-n-Slide" while being "stoned out of their minds". Mars was not seen in this footage, implying that he would not appear in the video. It premiered on October 26, 2011, on several MTV channels.

In the video, Snoop Dogg and Wiz Khalifa play two students at "N. Hale High School" (a play on the word "inhale"). A "chilled out" Khalifa and an "easy going" Dogg have a good time at a party, skateboard in a parking lot and drive around it in a "souped-up off-road kart" with several girls. They linger "on the hood of a car" with tattooed "hot babes" who play on a Slip-N-Slide. Dogg is seen driving his 1967 Pontiac Parisienne. The scenes are interspersed with "psychedelic" footage from Mac & Devin Go to High School with a "nerded-out" Khalifa.

Mars did not appear in the video. In 2023, Khalifa revealed during an interview on "Drink Champs" that Atlantic Records did not want Mars to appear in the video. This was due to the latter's arrest for cocaine possession in late 2010, as the label did not want him associated with a 'get high record'.

== Live performances and reception ==
"Young, Wild & Free" was performed live several times. Snoop Dogg and Wiz Khalifa began their High School Tour (a small, joint tour) in late 2011 to promote the soundtrack, and "Young, Wild & Free" was the closing song. On December 5, 2011 Snoop Dogg and Wiz Khalifa performed the song on Late Night with Jimmy Fallon. In early 2012, Snoop Dogg and Wiz Khalifa appeared on Power 106's Big Boy's Neighborhood and performed the single. Khalifa performed the song live on the 2012 VMA Tour, and Dogg performed it during his set at Coachella 2012; Khalifa joined him onstage with a giant joint. Khalifa co-headlined with Fall Out Boy on the Boys of Zummer (North American) leg of the American Beauty/American Psycho Tour (2015), where he performed the single. Snoop Dogg and Wiz Khalifa united for the High Road Summer Tour (2016), where they performed "Young, Wild & Free" together. Dogg rapped the song as the final act of his Puff Puff Pass Tour Part 2 (2016).

Rob Markman of MTV attended a show of the High School Tour, and said that Snoop and Khalifa's "onstage chemistry was undeniable." Brittany Spanos of Rolling Stone found Khalifa truthful "to his blunted rep"; during the song's performance on the Boys of Zummer tour, he tossed two large, inflatable joints around. The Palm Beach Post's Corvaya Jeffries said about the High Road Summer tour, "No one was seated. If they weren't dancing, they were still standing with phones in hand ... Fans sang the feel good chorus at the top of their lungs." Cal Roach of the Milwaukee Record reviewed a Puff Puff Pass Tour Part 2 show, and using "Young, Wild & Free" to close Dogg's set "felt preposterously appropriate".

In 2022, Mars sung "Young, Wild & Free" as part of a medley during his Bruno Mars Live (2022-2024) setlist.

== Track listing ==
Digital download
No.	Title	Length
1.	"Young, Wild & Free" (Explicit) (featuring Bruno Mars)	3:27

Digital download
No.	Title	Length
1.	"Young, Wild & Free" (Clean) (featuring Bruno Mars)	3:27

CD single
No.	Title	Length
1.	"Young, Wild & Free" (Explicit) (featuring Bruno Mars)	3:27
2.	"Young, Wild & Free" (Music Video) (featuring Bruno Mars)	3:27

== Personnel ==
Credits adapted from the liner notes of Mac & Devin Go to High School (soundtrack) and ASCAP.

- Calvin Broadus, Cameron Thomaz, Peter Hernandez, Philip Lawrence, Ari Levine, Cristopher Brown, Ted Bluechel, Marlon Barrow, Tyrone Griffin, Keenon Jackson, Nye Lee, Marquise Newman, Max Bennett, Larry Carlton, John Guerin, Joe Sample, Tom Scott – songwriting
- The Smeezingtons – production
- Travis "Shaggy" Marshall – engineer
- Andy Drucker – engineer
- Ari Levine – engineer, mixing
- Chris Gehringer – mastering

== Charts ==
=== Weekly charts ===
List of chart positions
Chart (2011–2012)	Peak position
Australia (ARIA)	4
Austria (Ö3 Austria Top 40)	17
Belgium (Ultratop 50 Flanders)	9
Belgium (Ultratop 50 Wallonia)	13
Brazil (Billboard Hot 100 Airplay)	54
Canada Hot 100 (Billboard)	13
Canada CHR/Top 40 (Billboard)	10
Canada Hot AC (Billboard)	46
Czech Republic Airplay (ČNS IFPI)	11
Denmark (Tracklisten)	19
France (SNEP)	6
Germany (GfK)	15
Hungary (Rádiós Top 40)	17
Ireland (IRMA)	33
Israel (Media Forest)	3
Italy (FIMI)	5
Japan Hot 100 (Billboard)	85
Netherlands (Dutch Top 40)	7
Netherlands (Single Top 100)	11
New Zealand (Recorded Music NZ)	2
Norway (VG-lista)	6
Poland Airplay (ZPAV)	3
South Korea International Singles (Gaon)	22
Sweden (Sverigetopplistan)	14
Switzerland (Schweizer Hitparade)	6
UK Singles (Official Charts)	44
UK Hip Hop/R&B (Official Charts)	12
US Billboard Hot 100	7
US Dance Airplay (Billboard)	19
US Hot Latin Songs (Billboard)	34
US Pop Airplay (Billboard)	10
US Hot R&B/Hip-Hop Songs (Billboard)	56
US Hot Rap Songs (Billboard)	4
US Rhythmic Airplay (Billboard)	1

=== Year-end charts ===
List of chart positions
Chart (2011)	Position
Australia (ARIA)	75
New Zealand (RIANZ)	46

List of chart positions
Chart (2012)	Position
Australia (ARIA)	60
Belgium (Ultratop Flanders)	54
Belgium (Ultratop Wallonia)	80
Brazil Pop Charts (Crowley)	24
Canada (Canadian Hot 100)	43
Germany (Media Control AG)	86
Italy (FIMI)	45
Netherlands (Dutch Top 40)	46
Netherlands (Single Top 100)	75
Sweden (Sverigetopplista)	43
Switzerland (Schweizer Hitparade)	32
US Billboard Hot 100	32
US Pop Songs (Billboard)	49
US Rap Songs (Billboard)	19
US Rhythmic (Billboard)	3

== Certifications ==
List of certifications
Region	Certification	Certified units/sales
Australia (ARIA)	5× Platinum	350,000^{‡}
Austria (IFPI Austria)	Gold	15,000^{*}
Belgium (BRMA)	Gold	15,000^{*}
Canada (Music Canada)	3× Platinum	240,000^{*}
Denmark (IFPI Danmark)	Gold	15,000^{^}
Germany (BVMI)	5× Gold	750,000^{‡}
Italy (FIMI)	3× Platinum	150,000^{‡}
Mexico (AMPROFON)	Gold	30,000^{*}
New Zealand (RMNZ)	6× Platinum	180,000^{‡}
Sweden (GLF)	2× Platinum	80,000^{‡}
Switzerland (IFPI Switzerland)	Gold	15,000^{^}
United Kingdom (BPI)	Platinum	600,000^{‡}
United States (RIAA)	6× Platinum	6,000,000^{‡}
Streaming
Denmark (IFPI Danmark)	2× Platinum	1,800,000^{†}
Japan (RIAJ)	Gold	50,000,000^{†}
^{*} Sales figures based on certification alone.^{^} Shipments figures based on certification alone.^{‡} Sales+streaming figures based on certification alone.^{†} Streaming-only figures based on certification alone.

== Release history ==
List of release history, showing region(s), date(s), format(s) and label(s)
Region	Date	Format	Label	Ref.
Various	October 11, 2011	Digital download	Rostrum; Atlantic	(Note: On October 11, 2011 the single was released in various countries.)
Various	October 21, 2011	Digital download	Rostrum; Atlantic	(Note: On October 21, 2011 a clean version of the single was released in various countries.)
Italy	November 25, 2011	Radio airplay	Warner Music Group	
United Kingdom	December 4, 2011	Digital download	Unknown	
Germany	February 3, 2012	CD single	Atlantic	
Austria	February 3, 2012	CD single	Atlantic	
Switzerland	February 3, 2012	CD single	Atlantic	

== See also ==
- List of Billboard Hot 100 top 10 singles in 2012
- List of Billboard Rhythmic number-one songs of the 2010s
