= Jukebox Ella: The Complete Verve Singles, Vol. 1 =

Compilation album by Ella Fitzgerald
- Released: 2003
- Recorded: 1956–1965
- Genre: Jazz
- Length: 118:27
- Label: Verve
- Producer: Norman Granz

Ella Fitzgerald chronology
The Complete Ella Fitzgerald & Louis Armstrong on Verve (1997)	Jukebox Ella: The Complete Verve Singles, Vol. 1 (2003)

Jukebox Ella: The Complete Verve Singles, Vol. 1 is a 2003 compilation album by the American jazz singer Ella Fitzgerald. The album contains singles Fitzgerald recorded for Verve Records between 1956 and 1965.

Initially announced for Fall 2004, the second volume was released in November 2025.

== Track listing ==
Disc One

1. "Stay There" (Gus Kahn, Jule Styne) – 2:35
2. "The Sun Forgot to Shine This Morning" (Bill Carey, Gene Howard) – 3:17
3. "Too Young for the Blues" (Biff Jones, Charles Meyer) – 3:16
4. "It's Only a Man" (Hal Borne, Paul Francis Webster) – 3:27
5. "Beale Street Blues" (W. C. Handy) – 2:27
6. "(The End of) A Beautiful Friendship" (Kahn, Styne) – 2:37
7. "The Silent Treatment" (Kahn, Styne) – 2:51
8. "Hear My Heart" (Buddy Lester) – 2:19
9. "Hotta Chocolatta" (Milton Drake, Victor Mizzy) – 3:08
10. "A-Tisket, A-Tasket" (Van Alexander, Ella Fitzgerald) – 2:20
11. "Teach Me How to Cry" (Phil Tuminello) – 2:58
12. "Swingin' Shepherd Blues" (Kenny Jacobson, Moe Koffman, Rhoda Roberts) – 2:41
13. "Your Red Wagon" (Gene DePaul, Richard M. Jones, Don Raye) – 2:56
14. "Trav'lin' Light" (Johnny Mercer, Jimmy Mundy, Trummy Young) – 3:12
15. "Oh, What a Night for Love" (Steve Allen, Neal Hefti) – 2:24
16. "Dreams Are Made for Children" (Mack David, Jerry Livingston, Max Meth) – 2:38
17. "But Not for Me" (George Gershwin, Ira Gershwin) – 2:05
18. "The Christmas Song" (Mel Tormé, Robert Wells) – 3:18

Disc Two

1. "The Secret of Christmas" (Sammy Cahn, Jimmy Van Heusen) – 2:47
2. Medley: "We Three Kings Of Orient Are", "O Little Town of Bethlehem" (Bishop Phillips Brooks, John Henry Hopkins Jr., Lewis H. Redner) – 3:36
3. "You're Driving Me Crazy" ("Ich Fuhle Mich Crazy") (Walter Donaldson, Gilbert Obermair) – 3:07
4. "(If You Can't Sing It) You'll Have to Swing It (Mr. Paganini)" (Sam Coslow) – 3:46
5. "Call Me Darling" (Dorothy Dick, Mort Fryberg, Rolf Marbet, Bert Reisfeld) – 2:35
6. "Bill Bailey, Won't You Come Home?" (Hughie Cannon) – 3:24
7. "Ol' Man Mose" (Louis Armstrong, Zilner Randolph) – 3:53
8. "Desafinado (Off Key)" (Jesse Cavanaugh, Jon Hendricks, Antonio Carlos Jobim, Newton Mendonça) – 2:11
9. "Stardust" (Hoagy Carmichael, Mitchell Parish) – 2:32
10. "All the Live Long Day" (G. Gershwin, I. Gershwin) – 2:41
11. "I'm a Poached Egg (Without Toast)" (G. Gershwin, I. Gershwin) – 2:35
12. "Ringo Beat" (Fitzgerald) – 1:48
13. "I'm Fallin' in Love" (Barney Kessel) – 2:36
14. "She's Just a Quiet Girl" (Riziero Ortolani, Paul Vance) – 2:53
15. "We Three (My Echo, My Shadow and Me)" (Nelson Cogane, Sammy Mysels, Dick Robertson) – 2:38
16. "The Shadow of Your Smile" (Johnny Mandel, Webster) – 3:06
17. "A Place for Lovers" (Manuel DeSica, Norman Gimbel) – 2:41
18. "Lonely Is" (Clint Ballard Jr., Hal Hackaday) – 3:33

== Personnel ==
- Ella Fitzgerald – vocals
- Bob Cooper – Clarinet, Tenor saxophone
- Harry Edison – Trumpet
- Maynard Ferguson – Trumpet
- Herb Geller – Clarinet, Alto saxophone
- Bill Holman – Tenor saxophone
- Dick Hyman – Organ
- Gordon Jenkins – Conductor, Arranger
- Barney Kessel – Guitar, Conductor, Arranger
- Mel Lewis – Drums
- Ted Nash – Clarinet, Flute, Tenor saxophone
- Bud Shank – Flute, Alto saxophone
- Ben Webster – Tenor saxophone
- Pete Candoli – Trumpet
- Bob Enevoldsen – Tenor saxophone, Valve trombone
- Mort Herbert – Violin
- Ronnie Lang – Alto saxophone
- Stan Levey – Drums
- Lou Levy – Piano, Celesta
- Ray Linn – Trumpet
- Matty Matlock – Flute
- Arnold Ross – Piano
- Jimmy Woode – Bass
- Buddy Bregman – Conductor
- Corky Hale – Harp
- Frank De Vol – Conductor, Arranger
- Felix Slatkin – Violin
- Ralph Carmichael – Conductor
- Med Flory – Baritone saxophone
- Al Porcino – Trumpet
- Victor Arno – Violin
- Israel Baker – Violin
- Robert Barene – Violin
- Max Bennett – Bass
- Milt Bernhart – Trombone
- Larry Bunker – Percussion
- Joe Comfort – Bass
- Conrad Gozzo – Trumpet
- James A. Decker – French horn
- Harold Dicterow – Violin
- Alvin Dinkin – Viola
- Don Fagerquist – Trumpet
- David Frisina – Violin
- Russ Garcia – Conductor
- Chuck Gentry – Bass clarinet, Baritone saxophone
- Edward Gilbert – Tuba
- Benny Gill – Violin
- Jewell L. Grant – Woodwinds
- William Green – Woodwinds
- Skeets Herfurt – Woodwinds
- Norm Herzberg – Bassoon
- Milt Holland – Percussion
- Jules Jacob – Woodwinds
- Gus Johnson – Drums
- Knud Jorgensen – Piano
- Kathyrine Julye – Harp
- Anatol Kaminsky – Violin
- Armand Karpoff – Cello
- John Kitzmiller – Tuba
- Joe Koch – Woodwinds
- Raphael Kramer – Cello
- Dan Lube – Violin
- Alfred Lustgarten – Violin
- Edgar Lustgarten – Cello
- Virginia Majewski – Viola
- Joe Mondragon – Bass
- Jack Marsh – Bassoon
- Marty Paich – Conductor, Arranger
- Wilfred Middlebrooks – Bass
- Dick Nash – Trombone
- George Neikrug – Cello
- Nelson Riddle – Conductor, Arranger
- Erno Neufeld – Violin
- Robert Ostrowsky – Viola
- Lou Raderman – Violin
- Dorothy Remsen – Harp
- George Roberts – Bass trombone
- Paul Robyn – Viola
- Nathan Ross – Violin
- William Schiopffe – Drums
- Wilbur Schwartz – Woodwinds
- Paul Shure – Violin
- Alvin Stoller – Drums
- Fred Stulce – Flute
- Milton Thomas – Viola
- Lloyd Ulyate – Trombone
- Champ Webb – Woodwinds
- Paul Weston – Conductor, Arranger
- Vincent DeRosa – French Horn
- Alex Beller – Violin
- Eleanor Slatkin – Cello
- Victor Bay – Violin
- David Filerman – Cello
- Bert Gassman – Woodwinds
- Stanley Harris – Viola
- Jan Hlinka – Viola
- Murray Kellner – Violin
- Sylvia Ruderman – Flute
- Clint Neagley – Alto Saxophone
- Albert Saparoff – Violin
- Justin DiTullio – Cello
- Arnold Koblentz – Woodwinds
- Abe Luboff – Bass
- Nino Rosso – Cello
- Karl de Karske – Bass trombone
- Sam Freed – Violin
- Leonard Hartman – Flute
- Martin Ruderman – Flute
- Ambrose Russo – Violin
- George Werth – Trumpet
- Tommy Pederson – Trombone
- Joe Howard – Trombone
- Maurice Stein – Alto sSaxophone
- Elizabeth Greenschpoon – Cello
- Sanford Schonbach – Viola
- Gordon Schoneberg – Oboe
- Misha Russel – Concertmaster
- Bill Miller – Violin
- Kenneth Lowman – Bassoon
- Ernest Romersa – Woodwinds
- Philip Stephens – Bass
- Paul Smith – Piano
- Sam Albert – Violin
- Francis "Frenchie" Concepcion – Cello
- G.R. Henhenninck – Viola
- Henry Hill – Violin
- Buddy Bregman – Arranger
- Ellen Fitton – Mastering
- Hollis King – Art Direction
- Bryan Koniarz – Producer
- Ken Druker – Executive producer
- Stuart Nicholson – Liner notes
- Stephanie Stein Crease – Notes editing
- Miguel Villalobos – Illustrations
