= Langtrees =

Brand of bordellos in Australia

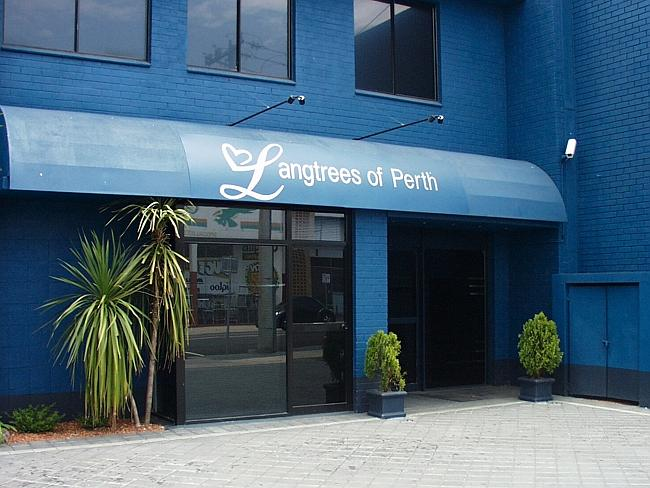
- Front entrance of Langtrees in Perth
- Industry: Brothel
- Founded: 1975
- Founder: Mary-Anne Kenworthy
- Headquarters: Perth, Australia
- Area served: Australia-wide
- Number of employees: 100+
- Divisions: Langtrees VIP Canberra; Langtrees Sydney
- Website: au.langtrees.com

Langtrees is Australia's largest bordello brand, with premises in Perth and Canberra. It is owned by Mary-Anne Kenworthy, Australia's most well-known madam.

== Locations ==
Perth's largest bordello is located at 71 Burswood Road in Burswood. It ceased operating for two days in May 2002 as US sailors wore out sex workers. In July 2011, two men smashed through the front door at about 12:30 am and demanded money from the till.

The only licensed bar and bordello in Australia is located at 32 Grimwade Street in Mitchell, Canberra. Marketed as an upmarket luxury bordello, Kenworthy purchased it in 2014.

A premises was opened in Kalgoorlie in 2000, marketed as one of the only working brothel museums in the world. In January 2007, Kalgoorlie's Hay Street brothel strip turned to tourism offering tours in a bid to keep alive, but the premises ceased operating as a bordello in 2012. After housing a restaurant, it was put onto the market in 2019.

In December 2016, Langtrees bought out Darwin Escorts, which became known as Langtrees VIP Darwin and Chillout Lounge before being closed in 2022.

== See also ==
- Prostitution in Australia
