= Smokin' On =

Song by Snoop Dogg and Wiz Khalifa featuring Juicy J

from the album Mac & Devin Go to High School
- Recorded: 2011
- Genre: West Coast hip-hop; alternative hip-hop
- Length: 4:28
- Label: Atlantic; Rostrum; Doggystyle; Fontana Records
- Songwriters: Calvin Broadus; Cameron Thomaz; Jordan Houston; Christopher Golson
- Producer: Drumma Boy

"Smokin' On" is a song by American rappers Snoop Dogg and Wiz Khalifa, from the soundtrack Mac & Devin Go to High School. The song features fellow American rapper Juicy J. The song produced by Drumma Boy.

== Music video ==
The music video was released on January 17, 2012, in Snoop Dogg's channel on YouTube.

== Commercial performance ==
On the chart dated December 31, 2011, "Smokin' On" entered the Bubbling Under Hot 100 at number 17 and number 23 on Rap Digital Songs.

== Charts ==
Chart (2011)	Peak position
US Bubbling Under Hot 100 Singles (Billboard)	17
