= Stoner's EP =

EP by Snoop Dogg
- Released: April 17, 2012
- Recorded: 2011–12
- Genre: Hip hop
- Length: 39:07
- Label: Gangsta Gangsta Online Distribution

Snoop Dogg chronology
Mac & Devin Go to High School (2011)	Stoner's EP (2012)	That's My Work, Volume 1 (2012)

Stoner's EP is the debut extended play (EP) by American rapper Snoop Dogg. The EP was released on April 17, 2012, by Gangsta Gangsta Online Distribution.

== Critical response ==
Professional ratings
Review scores
Source	Rating
HipHopDX	2/5 stars

Stoner's EP received an average rating from music critic Phillip Mlynar of HipHopDX. He gave the album two out of five stars, saying "Weed-based rap music doesn't always have to be languid and laid back, like much of the production on Stoners EP. After all, rappers like Curren$y and Action Bronson are creating some of the hypest rap music out there while parading around with a joint permanently dangling from his lips. But with this curious EP release, Snoop has committed the more heinous sin of confusing being relaxed with turning lazy. Someone wake him up for next time."

== Commercial performance ==
Stoner's debuted at number 167 on the US Billboard 200, selling 2,500 copies in its first week.

== Track listing ==
No.	Title	Length
1.	"1st We Blaze It Up"	3:53
2.	"Stoner's Anthem"	3:55
3.	"Show You How a Gangsta Do"	3:52
4.	"Make It Hot"	3:45
5.	"Breathe It In"	4:50
6.	"It's Gettin' Harder (Interlude)"	0:58
7.	"Weekend Lovers" (performed by Chris Starr)	3:31
8.	"Need It In My Life" (performed by Ndastree)	3:29
9.	"Really Wanna Be with You"	5:35
10.	"Can You Take Me" (performed by Hustle Boyz)	5:18

== Charts ==
Chart (2012)	Peak position
US Billboard 200	167
US Top R&B/Hip-Hop Albums (Billboard)	31
US Independent Albums (Billboard)	33
