= Mac & Devin Go to High School =

- Home media cover art
- Directed by: Dylan Brown
- Screenplay by: Herschel Faber; Jamieson Stern; Jarrett Golding
- Story by: Snoop Dogg; Wiz Khalifa; Pook Brown
- Produced by: Ted Chung; Benjy Grinberg; Lucy Brown; Dylan Brown
- Starring: Snoop Dogg; Wiz Khalifa; Mike Epps; Andy Milonakis; Teairra Marí; Luenell; Mystikal
- Cinematography: Luis Perez
- Edited by: Dan Dobi
- Music by: King Kenobby
- Production companies: Yard Entertainment; Doggystyle Records
- Distributed by: Anchor Bay Films
- Release date: July 3, 2012
- Running time: 75 minutes
- Country: United States
- Language: English

Mac & Devin Go to High School is a 2012 American stoner comedy film. The film was directed by Dylan Brown and stars rappers Snoop Dogg and Wiz Khalifa (in his film debut) in the title roles, along with Mike Epps, Teairra Mari, Andy Milonakis, Luenell in supporting roles and the voice of Mystikal as a narrator character. The story follows two high school students, geeky Devin and badman Mac, a stoner who befriends Devin and introduces him to weed. Critical reception was overwhelmingly negative.

The film was released as Direct-to-DVD/Blu-ray exclusive on July 3, 2012. The accompanying soundtrack—which included the hit song performed by the film's lead actors, "Young, Wild & Free", featuring with American singer Bruno Mars—was released in promotion for the film in October 2011.

== Cast ==
- Snoop Dogg as Mac Johnson
- Wiz Khalifa as Devin Overstreet
- Mike Epps as Mr. Armstrong
- Teairra Mari as Ms. Huck
- Luenell as Principal Cummings
- Paul Iacono as Mahatma Chang Greenberg
- Andy Milonakis as Knees Down
- Mystikal as Slow Burn (Voice)
- Far East Movement as Detention Students
- Samantha Cole as Jasmine
- Don "Magic" Juan as Student Service Guy
- Winston Francis as Massage Parlor Bouncer
- Derek D as Assistant Principal Skinfloot
- Teni Panosian as Ashley
- Kendré Berry as Nerdy Chemistry Student
- Alicia Mone't as Jubilance
- Affion Crockett as Captain Kush
- Eunice Kiss as Mamasan
- Andray Johnson as Bail Officer
- Roz Wilson as Study Center Matron
- Carla Howe as Masseuse
- Jamieson Stern as Police Sergeant
- Melissa Howe as Tattoo Parlor Receptionist
- Kelly Pantaleoni as Jenny Billings
- William Stage as himself in the opening scenes.
- Shvona Lavette Chung as M.I.L.F.
- Cordelle Braudus as M.I.L.F.'s Son
- Jennifer Andrade as Munchie Machine Girl
- Young Pilot as A Freshman
- Raul Delante as Tattoo Artist
- Nasia Aissaoui as Foreign Exchange Student
- Dennis George Brown Jr. as Teacher

=== Students ===
- YG (Smoker #2)
- Tyga
- Julian (The Rangers)
- Langston (The Rangers)
- Day Day (The Rangers)
- Handan Yousef (Swedish student)

=== Hemptathalon ===
- Ty Dolla Sign as Smoker 1
- YG as Smoker 2
- Kendré Berry as Smoker 3
- Tiffany Hughes as Tooted and Pooted Girl

== Production ==
=== Soundtrack ===
The film's soundtrack was released on December 13, 2011, by Snoop Dogg and Wiz Khalifa, also under the title of Mac & Devin Go to High School. "Young, Wild & Free", featuring Bruno Mars, was the most popular song from the album and was successful worldwide: in its first week, the track sold 159,000 digital copies, debuting at number ten on the US Billboard Hot 100 and forty four on the Canadian Hot 100. Snoop Dogg revealed in an interview that the soundtrack's success had inspired him to make a movie based on "Young, Wild & Free", and in March 2012 it was announced that he and Wiz Khalifa would star in the spin-off Mac & Devin Go to High School: The Movie. Production and filming began immediately after the announcement.

Despite the song "This Weed Iz Mine" being featured in the movie, it did not appear on the soundtrack album.

=== Background ===
Snoop Dogg had announced plans to release a film and soundtrack with Wiz Khalifa in January 2011, with the release of the song "That Good", originally intended to be the soundtrack's lead single. Wiz Khalifa spoke on the soundtrack, saying: "It's a real big deal because nobody's done it like that as far as a veteran in the game, an OG, a pioneer and then the newest, youngest, most exciting dude in rap coming through, and really just giving people a complete project ... I'm a fan of it, separate myself from making it, [I'm] a huge fan of it. Can't wait."

=== Location controversy ===
Much of the film was shot at Mira Costa High School in Manhattan Beach, California, after the Manhattan Beach Unified School District granted a facilities use permit to The Yard Entertainment, the production company. After two days of filming over the weekend of May 7, 2011, production was halted when it was reported that individuals (some involved with the film, some not) were smoking marijuana on campus, leading the school district to revoke the permit. During the shoot, one group drove a car down the front stairs on the high school causing skid marks. Vandalism and theft from classrooms were also reported by teachers, and The Yard reportedly offered reimbursement to at least one.

=== DVD release ===
Straight-to-DVD release of the film was scheduled for April 20, 2012, which was then delayed to July 3, 2012. As of August 2012, the DVD had sold 54,641 units in the United States.

== Critical response ==
Mac & Devin Go to High School was panned by critics. Pre-release reviews were negative. After its release, JP DelaCuesta of AllHipHop gave it a 3/10, saying: "There's no other way to say this except Mac and Devin Go to High School is bad – plain and simple. The on-screen collaboration between these two Hip-Hop heavyweights is a joke, and for their sakes, hopefully a joke that they and everyone involved with Mac and Devin were in on. At the end of the day, the only thing that Mac and Devin Go to High School proves is that we need How High 2, and we need it bad!" Nathan Rabin of The A.V. Club also gave the film a negative review, saying "The protégé completes his evolution when he uses his high-school valedictorian speech to perform 'Young, Wild & Free,' the hit single from Mac & Devin Go To High School. 'Young, Wild & Free' is everything Mac & Devin Go To High School should be but isn't: fun, light, goofy, entertaining, and young. In moments like this, the movie possesses a strange, disarming innocence, but it forces audiences to endure a punishing gauntlet of misogyny and non-starting comedy to get to that middling moment of moderate enjoyment."
