= The Complete Ella Fitzgerald & Louis Armstrong on Verve =

Compilation album by Ella Fitzgerald, Louis Armstrong
- Released: May 20, 1997
- Recorded: August 1956 – October 1957
- Genre: Jazz
- Length: 90:45
- Label: Verve
- Producer: Michael Lang, Ben Young, Steve Fallone

Ella Fitzgerald chronology
The Complete Ella Fitzgerald Songbooks (1994)	The Complete Ella Fitzgerald & Louis Armstrong on Verve (1997)	Jukebox Ella: The Complete Verve Singles, Vol. 1 (2003)

Louis Armstrong chronology
Together for the First Time (1961)	The Complete Ella Fitzgerald & Louis Armstrong on Verve (1997)	Complete New York Town Hall & Boston Symphony Hall Concerts (2006)

Professional ratings
Review scores
Source	Rating
Allmusic	4.5/5 stars
The Penguin Guide to Jazz Recordings	3.5/4 stars

The Complete Ella Fitzgerald & Louis Armstrong on Verve is a compilation album released on Verve Records in 1997. It comprises three compact discs containing the three studio albums made for the label by Ella Fitzgerald and Louis Armstrong, released during 1956 through 1958.

Its 47 tracks are collated from Ella and Louis, Ella and Louis Again, and Porgy and Bess. Two tracks are from an August 15, 1956, concert at the Hollywood Bowl with the duo backed by Armstrong's touring band, the All Stars. Disc one tracks one through eleven comprise Ella and Louis, while disc one tracks 12 through 16 and disc two tracks one through 14 comprise Ella and Louis Again. The Hollywood Bowl performances are on tracks 15 and 16 of disc two, and disc three contains the Porgy and Bess album. Not all tracks are vocal duets and are indicated below.

== Track listing ==
=== Disc one ===
No.	Title	Writer(s)	Length
1.	"Can't We Be Friends?"	Paul James, Kay Swift	3:47
2.	"Isn't This a Lovely Day?"	Irving Berlin	6:16
3.	"Moonlight in Vermont"	John Blackburn, Karl Suessdorf	3:42
4.	"They Can't Take That Away from Me"	Ira Gershwin, George Gershwin	4:39
5.	"Under a Blanket of Blue"	Jerry Livingston, Al J. Neiburg, Marty Symes	4:18
6.	"Tenderly"	Walter Gross, Jack Lawrence	5:10
7.	"A Foggy Day"	Ira Gershwin, George Gershwin	4:32
8.	"Stars Fell on Alabama"	Mitchell Parish, Frank Perkins	3:34
9.	"Cheek to Cheek"	Irving Berlin	5:53
10.	"The Nearness of You"	Hoagy Carmichael, Ned Washington	5:42
11.	"April in Paris"	Vernon Duke, Yip Harburg	6:33
12.	"Don't Be That Way"	Benny Goodman, Edgar Sampson, Mitchell Parish	4:59
13.	"Makin' Whoopee" (Armstrong solo vocal)	Walter Donaldson, Gus Kahn	3:56
14.	"They All Laughed"	Ira Gershwin, George Gershwin	3:46
15.	"Comes Love" (Fitzgerald solo vocal)	Lew Brown, Sam Stept, Charles Tobias	2:25
16.	"Autumn in New York"	Vernon Duke	5:57

=== Disc two ===
No.	Title	Writer(s)	Length
1.	"Let's Do It" (Armstrong solo vocal)	Cole Porter	8:41
2.	"Stompin' at the Savoy"	Benny Goodman, Edgar Sampson, Chick Webb, Andy Razaf	5:12
3.	"I Won't Dance"	Jerome Kern, Oscar Hammerstein II, Otto Harbach, Dorothy Fields	4:43
4.	"Gee, Baby, Ain't I Good to You"	Don Redman, Andy Razaf	4:12
5.	"Let's Call the Whole Thing Off"	Ira Gershwin, George Gerswhin	4:11
6.	"These Foolish Things" (Fitzgerald solo vocal)	Harry Link, Holt Marvell, Jack Strachey	7:36
7.	"I've Got My Love to Keep Me Warm"	Irving Berlin	3:09
8.	"Willow Weep for Me" (Armstrong solo vocal)	Ann Ronell	4:18
9.	"I'm Putting All My Eggs in One Basket"	Irving Berlin	3:26
10.	"A Fine Romance"	Dorothy Fields, Jerome Kern	3:52
11.	"Ill Wind" (Fitzgerald solo vocal)	Harold Arlen, Ted Koehler	3:41
12.	"Love Is Here to Stay"	Ira Gershwin, George Gershwin	3:58
13.	"I Get a Kick out of You" (Armstrong solo vocal)	Cole Porter	4:17
14.	"Learnin' the Blues"	Dolores Silver	7:11
15.	"You Won't Be Satisfied (Until You Break My Heart)" (live at the Hollywood Bowl)	Freddie James, Larry Stock	3:53
16.	"Undecided" (Fitzgerald solo vocal live at the Hollywood Bowl)	Sidney Robin, Charlie Shavers	3:40

=== Disc three ===
No.	Title	Writer(s)	Length
1.	"Overture" (instrumental)	George Gershwin (arranged by Russell Garcia)	10:52
2.	"Summertime"	DuBose Heyward, George Gershwin	4:58
3.	"I Wants to Stay Here" (Fitzgerald solo vocal)	DuBose Heyward, Ira Gershwin, George Gershwin	4:38
4.	"My Man's Gone Now" (Fitzgerald solo vocal)	DuBose Heyward, George Gershwin	4:02
5.	"I Got Plenty O' Nuttin'"	DuBose Heyward, Ira Gershwin, George Gershwin	3:52
6.	"Buzzard Song" (Fitzgerald solo vocal)	DuBose Heyward, George Gershwin	2:58
7.	"Bess, You Is My Woman Now"	DuBose Heyward, Ira Gershwin, George Gershwin	5:28
8.	"It Ain't Necessarily So"	Ira Gershwin, George Gershwin	6:34
9.	"What You Want Wid Bess?" (Fitzgerald solo vocal)	DuBose Heyward, George Gershwin	1:59
10.	"A Woman Is a Sometime Thing" (Armstrong solo vocal)	DuBose Heyward, George Gershwin	4:47
11.	"Oh, Doctor Jesus" (Fitzgerald solo vocal)	DuBose Heyward, Ira Gershwin, George Gershwin	2:00
12.	"Here Come de Honey Man / Crab Man / Oh, Dey's So Fresh and Fine"	DuBose Heyward, George Gershwin	3:29
13.	"There's a Boat Dat's Leavin Soon for New York" (Armstrong solo vocal)	Ira Gershwin, George Gershwin	4:54
14.	"Bess, Oh Where's My Bess?" (Armstrong solo vocal)	Ira Gershwin, George Gershwin	2:36
15.	"Oh Lawd, I'm on My Way!" (Armstrong solo vocal with chorus)	DuBose Heyward, George Gershwin	2:57

== Personnel ==
- Ella Fitzgerald — vocals
- Louis Armstrong — vocals; trumpet on disc one tracks one through eleven and "Autumn in New York," "Stompin' at the Savoy," "Gee Baby Ain't I Good to You," "Willow Weep for Me," "Love Is Here to Stay," "Learnin' the Blues," "You Won't Be Satisfied," "Undecided," "Summertime," "I Got Plenty o' Nuttin'," "It Ain't Necessarily So," "A Woman Is a Sometime Thing," and "There's a Boat Dat's Leavin' Soon for New York"

=== Accompaniment on discs one and two ===
- Trummy Young — trombone on "You Won't Be Satisfied" and "Undecided"
- Edmond Hall — clarinet on "You Won't Be Satisfied" and "Undecided"
- Oscar Peterson — piano on disc one and disc two tracks one through 14
- Billy Kyle — piano on "You Won't Be Satisfied" and "Undecided"
- Herb Ellis — guitar on disc one and disc two tracks one through 14
- Ray Brown — bass on disc one and disc two tracks one through 14
- Dale Jones — bass on "You Won't Be Satisfied" and "Undecided"
- Buddy Rich — drums on disc one tracks one through eleven
- Louie Bellson — drums on disc one tracks 12 through 16 and disc two tracks one through 14
- Barrett Deems — drums on "You Won't Be Satisfied" and "Undecided"

=== Orchestra on disc three ===
- Russell Garcia – arranger, conductor
- Victor Arno, Robert Barene, Jacques Gasselin, Joseph Livoti, Dan Lube, Amerigo Marino, Erno Neufeld, Marshall Sosson, Robert Sushel, Gerald Vinci, Tibor Zelig — violins
- Myron Bacon, Abraham Hochstein, Raymond Menhennick, Myron Sandler — violas
- Justin Di Tullio, Kurt Reher, William Van Den Burg — cellos
- Frank Beach, Buddy Childers, Cappy Lewis — trumpets
- Milt Bernhart, Marshall Cram, James Henderson, Lloyd Ulyate — trombones
- Vincent DeRosa – French horn
- Bill Miller, Paul Smith – piano
- Tony Rizzi – guitar
- Joe Mondragon – bass
- Alvin Stoller – drums

=== Additional personnel ===
- Norman Granz — original producer
- Val Valentin — session engineer
- Phil Stern — photography
