= Ringo Beat =

Single by Ella Fitzgerald
- B-side: "I'm Falling in Love"
- Released: 1965
- Recorded: October 23, 1964
- Genre: R&B
- Length: 1:52
- Label: Verve; 103440
- Songwriter(s): Ella Fitzgerald

Ella Fitzgerald singles chronology
"Can't Buy Me Love" (1965)	"Ringo Beat" (1965)	"Get Ready" (1969)

"Ringo Beat" is a 1965 novelty single written and recorded by American singer/songwriter Ella Fitzgerald. It was inspired by the popularity of Ringo Starr, the drummer of The Beatles. Fitzgerald had described the rock drumming style of her 16-year-old son, Ray Brown, Jr. as the "Ringo beat...cause that's where it all started". The guitarist Barney Kessel also appears on the song.

The Billboard magazine review from December 12, 1964, commented that "Swinging' Fitzgerald takes off on that all too famous beat. Great opportunity for the WNEW's to recognize The Beatles". Fitzgerald had complained in a November 1965 interview for Downbeat magazine that disc jockeys were refusing to play the song. It was released on CD as part of the 2003 album Jukebox Ella, a compilation of Fitzgerald's singles recorded for Verve Records.

Reviewing Jukebox Ella for Allmusic, John Bush described "Ringo Beat" as the only one of Fitzgerald's Verve singles to acknowledge rock and roll and felt that it was "mostly unembarrassed". In his biography of Fitzgerald, Stuart Nicholson described the song as "awful" and placed in the context of Fitzgerald's constant search for an elusive hit record.
