= Procuring (prostitution) =

Facilitation or provision of a prostitute

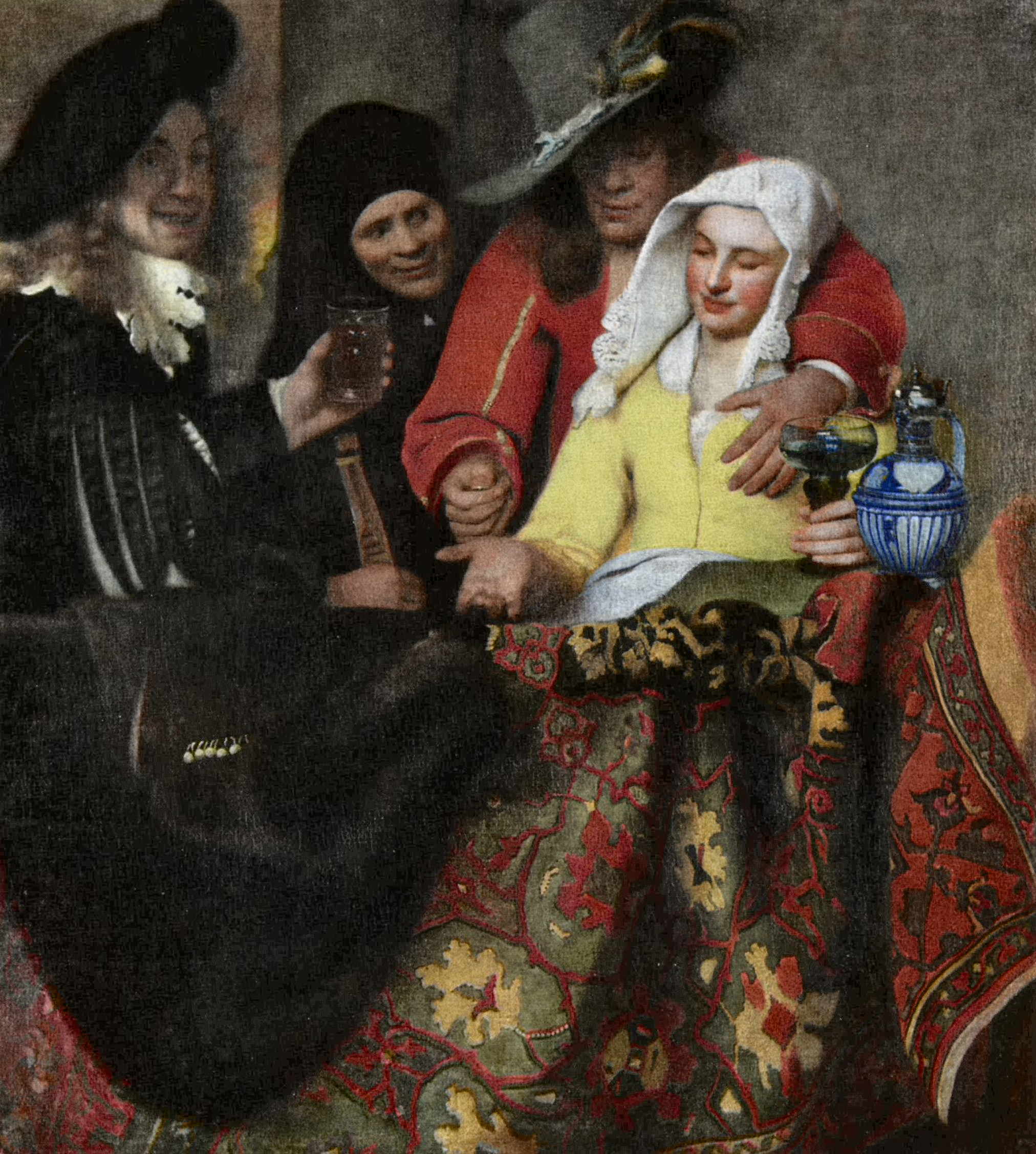
The Procuress by Jan Vermeer

Procuring, pimping, or pandering is the facilitation or provision of a prostitute or other sex worker in the arrangement of a sex act with a customer. A procurer, often called a pimp if male, or a procuress, often called a madam if female, or a brothel keeper, is an agent for prostitutes who collects part of their earnings. The procurer may receive this money in return for advertising services, physical protection, or for providing and possibly monopolizing a location where the prostitute may solicit clients. Like prostitution, the legality of certain actions of a madam or a pimp varies from one region to the next.

Examples of procuring include: helping to support trafficking a person into a country for the purpose of soliciting sex; operating a business where prostitution occurs; transporting a prostitute to the location of their arrangement; and deriving financial gain from the prostitution of another.

== Etymology ==
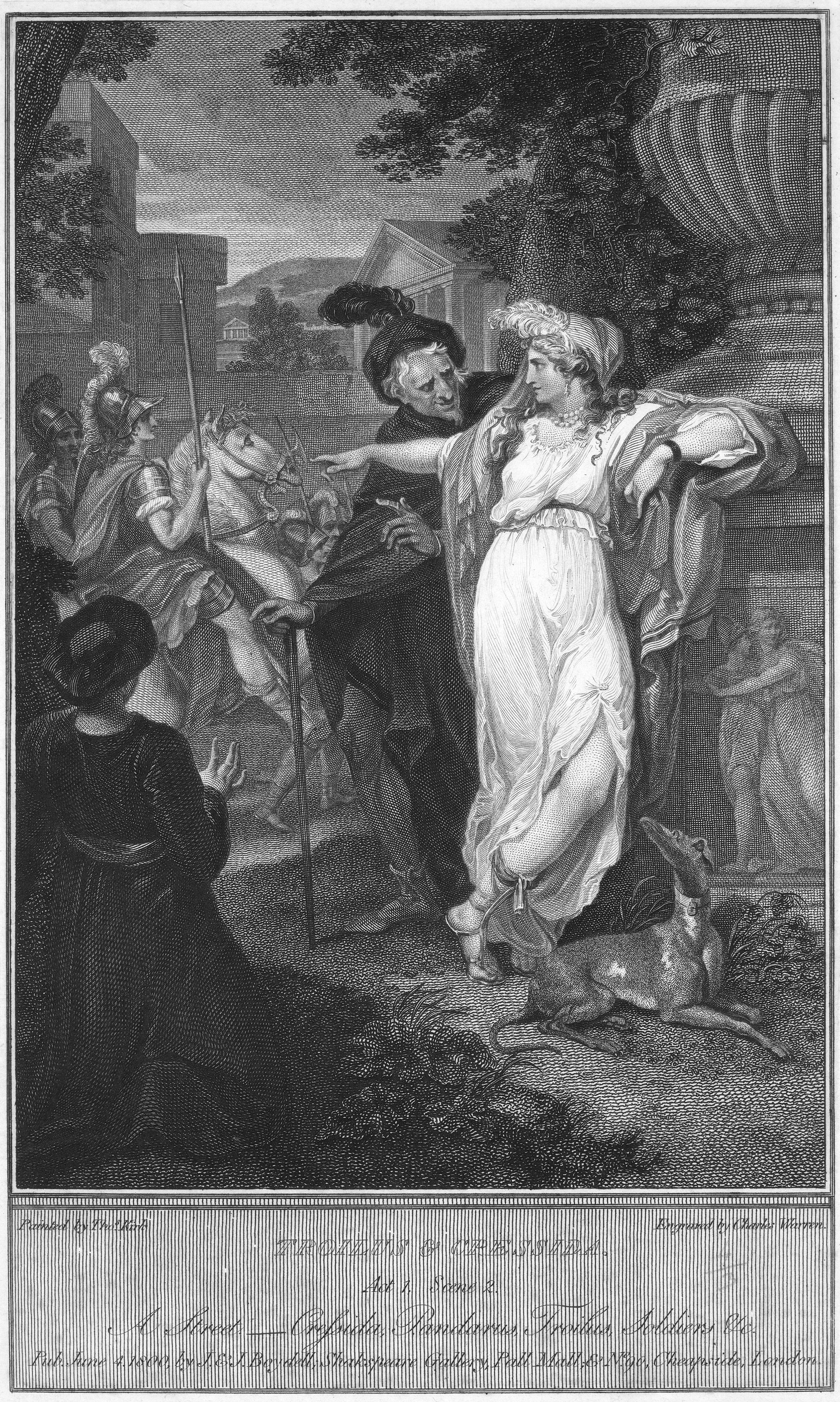
Pandarus, centre, with Cressida, illustration by Thomas Kirk to Troilus and Cressida

=== Procurer ===
The term procurer derives from the French procureur.

=== Pimping ===
The word pimp first appeared in English in 1600, in Ben Jonson’s play Every Man out of his Humor. It is of unknown origin, though there are several hypotheses about its etymology. Pimp used as a verb, meaning to act as a pimp, first appeared around 1640 in Philip Massinger's play, The Bashful Lover. In the 18th and 19th centuries, the term was commonly used to refer to informers. A pimp can also mean "a despicable person".

In the first years of the 21st century, a new meaning of the word emerged in the form of a transitive verb pimp, which means "to decorate" or "to gussy up". Compare primp, especially in Scottish usage. This new definition was made popular by Pimp My Ride, an MTV television show. Although this new definition paid homage to hip-hop culture and its connection to street culture, it has now entered common, even mainstream commercial, use.

In medical contexts, the verb means "to ask (a student) a question for the purpose of testing her or his knowledge".

=== Pandering ===
The word "pander", meaning to "pimp", is derived from Pandarus, a licentious figure who facilitates the affair between the protagonists in Troilus and Criseyde, a poem by Geoffrey Chaucer. Pandarus appears with a similar role in Shakespeare's interpretation of the story, Troilus and Cressida.

In the United Kingdom the term "pander" allows but does not require prostitution to be involved. The Shorter Oxford Dictionary defines it as "A go-between in illicit love affairs; a person who provides another with a means of gratifying lust; a pimp; a procurer".A person who assists the baser passions or evil designs of others."

== Overview ==
Pimps and madams are diverse and varied, depending on the strata in which they work, and they enter and leave the sex industry for a variety of internal and external reasons, such as family pressure, interactions with the police, and in some cases recruitment from peer sex workers.

Procuring can take abusive forms. Madams/pimps may punish clients for physical abuse or failure to pay, and enforce exclusive rights to "turf" where their prostitutes may advertise and operate with less competition. In the many places where prostitution is outlawed, sex workers have decreased incentive to report abuse for fear of self-incrimination, and increased motivation to seek any physical protection from clients and law enforcement that a madam/pimp might provide.

The madam/pimp–prostitute relationship is often understood to be abusive and possessive, with the pimp/madam using techniques such as psychological intimidation, manipulation, starvation, rape and/or gang rape, beating, tattooing to mark the woman as "theirs", confinement, threats of violence toward the victim's family, forced drug use and the shame from these acts. In some cases, a pimp will kidnap or abduct a minor and keep them in a confined space between acts of forced sexual intercourse.

In the US, madams/pimps can be arrested and charged with pandering and are legally known as procurers. A conviction under SORNA typically requires the procurer to be listed as a sex offender This, combined with the tendency to identify pimping with African-American masculinity, may provide some of the explanation for why approximately three-fifths of all "confirmed" human traffickers in the United States are African-American men. It has recently been argued that some of the extreme examples of violence cited in the article below come primarily from such stereotyping supported by Hollywood screenwriters, selective and decontextualized trial transcripts, and studies that have only interviewed parties to sex commerce in institutions of rescue, prosecution, and punishment, rather than engaging rigorous study in situ.

A 2018 study by researchers from the University of Montreal divided the concept of a pimp into three distinct categories: "low-profile" (primarily female), "hustlers" (predominantly male and violent, marking the common stereotype), and "abused" (even male–female split, more likely to be subjected to violence than to commit it).

== Legal status and debates about legality ==
Where prostitution is decriminalized or regulated, procuring may or may not be legal. Procuring regulations differ widely from place to place.

Procuring and brothels are legal in the Netherlands, Germany, Greece, New Zealand, most of Australia, and some counties in Nevada.

=== Canada ===
In Canada, there was a legal challenge to prostitution laws, which ended in the 2013 ruling of Bedford v. Canada. In 2010, Ontario Superior Court Judge Susan Himel overturned the national laws banning brothels and procuring, arguing that they violated the constitution guaranteeing "the right to life, liberty and security".

In 2012, the Court of Appeal for Ontario reaffirmed the unconstitutionality of the laws. The case was appealed by the Canadian government, and was under trial in the Supreme Court of Canada in June 2013. Since the passing of the Protection of Communities and Exploited Persons Act in 2014, Canada has followed the Nordic model of prostitution, which makes pimping and the purchasing of sexual services illegal.

=== United Nations ===
The United Nations 1949 Convention for the Suppression of the Traffic in Persons and of the Exploitation of the Prostitution of Others requires state signatories to ban pimping and brothels, and to abolish regulation of individual prostitutes. It states:

Whereas prostitution and the accompanying evil of the traffic in persons for the purpose of prostitution are incompatible with the dignity and worth of the human person and endanger the welfare of the individual, the family and the community

The convention reads:

Article 1

The Parties to the present Convention agree to punish any person who, to gratify the passions of another:

(1) Procures, entices or leads away, for purposes of prostitution, another person, even with the consent of that person;

(2) Exploits the prostitution of another person, even with the consent of that person.

Article 2

The Parties to the present Convention further agree to punish any person who:

(1) Keeps or manages, or knowingly finances or takes part in the financing of a brothel;

(2) Knowingly lets or rents a building or other place or any part thereof for the purpose of the prostitution of others.

Various UN commissions however have differing positions on the issue. For example, in 2012, a UNAIDS commission convened by Ban Ki-moon and backed by UNDP and UNAIDS, recommended the decriminalization of brothels and procuring.

=== United States ===
Attempts have been made in the US to charge pornographic-film producers with pandering under state law. The case of California v. Freeman in 1989 is one of the most prominent examples where a producer/director of pornographic films was charged with pandering under the argument that paying porn actors to perform sex on camera was a form of prostitution covered by a state anti-pandering statute. The State Supreme Court rejected this argument, finding that the California pandering statute was not intended to cover the hiring of actors who would be engaging in sexually explicit but non-obscene performances. It also stated that only in cases where the producer paid the actors for the purpose of sexually gratifying themselves or other actors, could the producer be charged with pandering under state law. This case effectively legalized pornography in the State of California. In 2008, the New Hampshire Supreme Court issued a similar ruling (New Hampshire v. Theriault) which declared that producing pornography was not a form of prostitution under state law.

== Business and methods ==
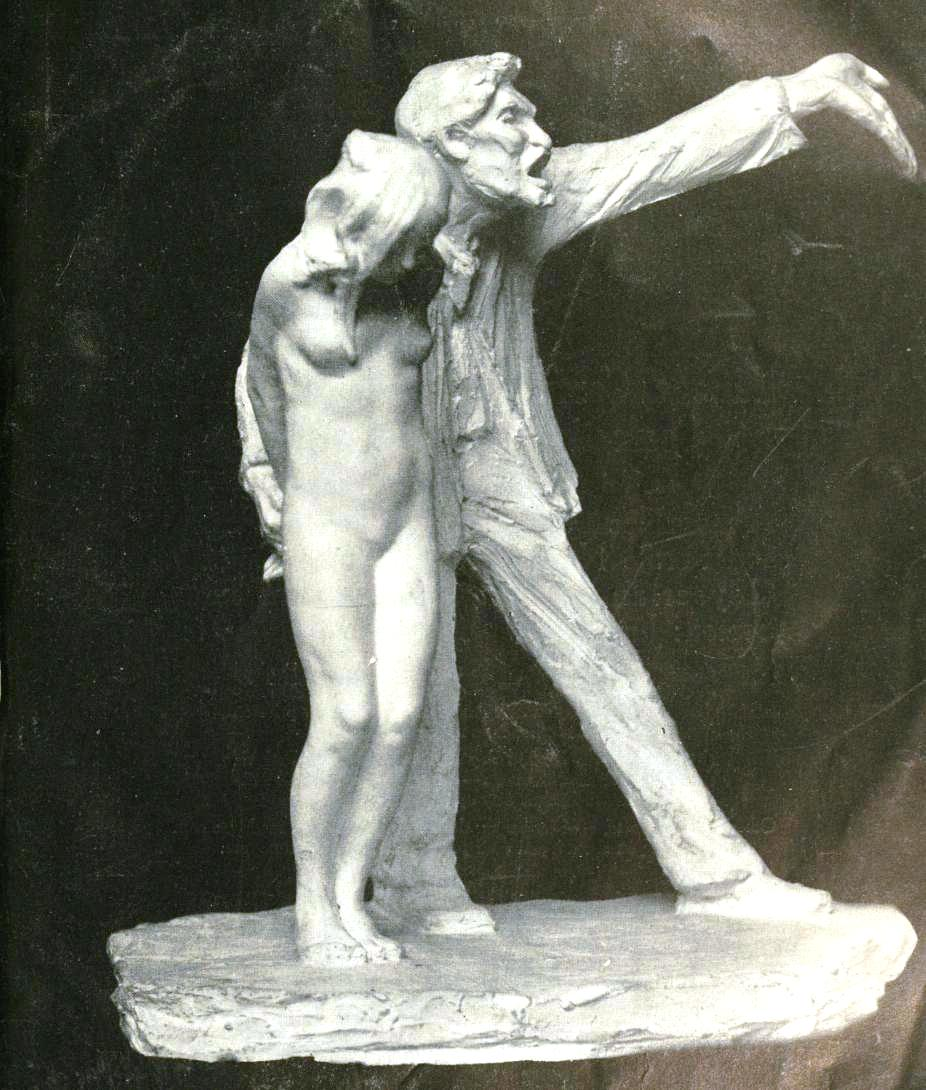
The White Slave statue by Abastenia St. Leger Eberle, location unknown

Pimping is typically operated like a business. In the US, a pimp may have a bottom girl who serves as office manager, keeping the pimp apprised of law-enforcement activity and collecting money from the prostitutes. Pimps recognize a hierarchy among themselves. In certain pimp strata, the least respected, or newer pimps, are the "popcorn pimps" and "wannabes". "Popcorn pimps" was a phenomenon which occurred among adolescent cocaine users of both sexes who utilized children younger than themselves to support their habits.

In the US, a pimp who uses violence and intimidation to control his prostitutes is called a "gorilla pimp". Those who use psychological trickery to deceive younger prostitutes into becoming hooked into the system are called "finesse pimps". In addition, a prostitute may "bounce" from pimp to pimp without paying the "pimp moving" tax.

Some pimps in the United States are also documented gang members, which causes concerns for police agencies in jurisdictions where prostitution is a significant problem. Pimping rivals narcotic sales as a major source of funding for many gangs. Gangs need money to survive, and money equates to power and respect. While selling drugs may be lucrative for a gang, this activity often carries significant risk as stiff legal penalties and harsh mandatory minimum sentencing laws exist. With pimping, gang members still make money while the prostitutes themselves bear the majority of the risk.

Pimping has several benefits to the gang that the pimp belongs to. These benefits include helping the gang recruit new members because the gang has women available for sex. The money brought in by prostitution allows gang members to buy cars, clothes and weapons, all of which help to recruit younger members into the gang by increasing the reputation of the gang in the local gang subculture.

=== Violence ===
Some pimp businesses have an internal structure – built around violence – for dealing with rule breakers. For example, some pimps have been known to employ a "pimp stick", which is two coat hangers wrapped together, in order to subdue unruly prostitutes. Although prostitutes can move between pimps, this movement sometimes leads to violence. For example, a prostitute could be punished for merely looking at another pimp; this is considered in some pimp milieus to be "reckless eyeballing". Violence can also be used on customers, for example if the customer attempts to evade payment or becomes unruly with a prostitute.

=== Romeo pimps and loverboys ===
Some pimps employ what is known as the "Loverboy" or "Romeo pimp" method to recruit new prostitutes. This involves entrapping potential victims (usually young or vulnerable women) by first forming what appears to the victim to be a romantic relationship. After an initial period of "love bombing", the treatment of the victim then becomes abusive, and the victim is then forced into sex work by the pimp.

=== Use of tattoos ===
Some pimps in the United States tattoo prostitutes as a mark of ownership. The tattoo will often be the pimp's street name or even his likeness. The mark might be as discreet as ankle tattoo, or blatant as a neck or face tattoo or large scale font across the prostitute's lower back, thigh, chest, or buttocks.

=== Internet effect ===
Since the Internet became widely available, prostitutes increasingly use websites to solicit sexual encounters. This has bypassed the need for pimps in some contexts, while some pimps have used these sites to broker their sex workers.

=== Criticism of portrayals ===
Some scholars and sex workers' rights advocates dispute portrayals of third-party agents as violent and extremely committed to a pimp subculture, finding them inaccurate exaggerations used to foster harmful policies. For example, one study found that pimps tend to drift in and out of pimping, with some of their goals and identities classified as predominantly mainstream, some as predominantly outside of that mainstream, and some as a hybrid of conventional and non-conventional.

== In popular culture ==
=== Notable pimps and madams ===
- Elizabeth Adams
- Polly Adler
- Ah Toy
- Brenda Allen
- Sydney Biddle Barrows
- Scotty Bowers
- Sean Combs
- Belle Cora
- Mary Ann Conklin
- Kristin M. Davis
- Shirley Finn
- Heidi Fleiss
- Marguerite Gourdan
- Lou Graham
- Dennis Hof
- Xaviera Hollander
- Don "Magic" Juan
- Mary-Anne Kenworthy
- Gangubai Kothewali
- Isabel La Negra
- Ghislaine Maxwell
- Enriqueta Martí
- Elizabeth Needham
- Dora Noyce
- Deborah Jeane Palfrey
- Justine Paris
- Grace Peixotto
- Lovisa von Plat
- Jurjentje Aukes Rauwerda
- Lindi St Clair
- Fillmore Slim
- Iceberg Slim
- Sally Stanford
- Al Swearengen
- Anna Wilson
- A Pimp Named Slickback

=== In art ===
Procuring in art

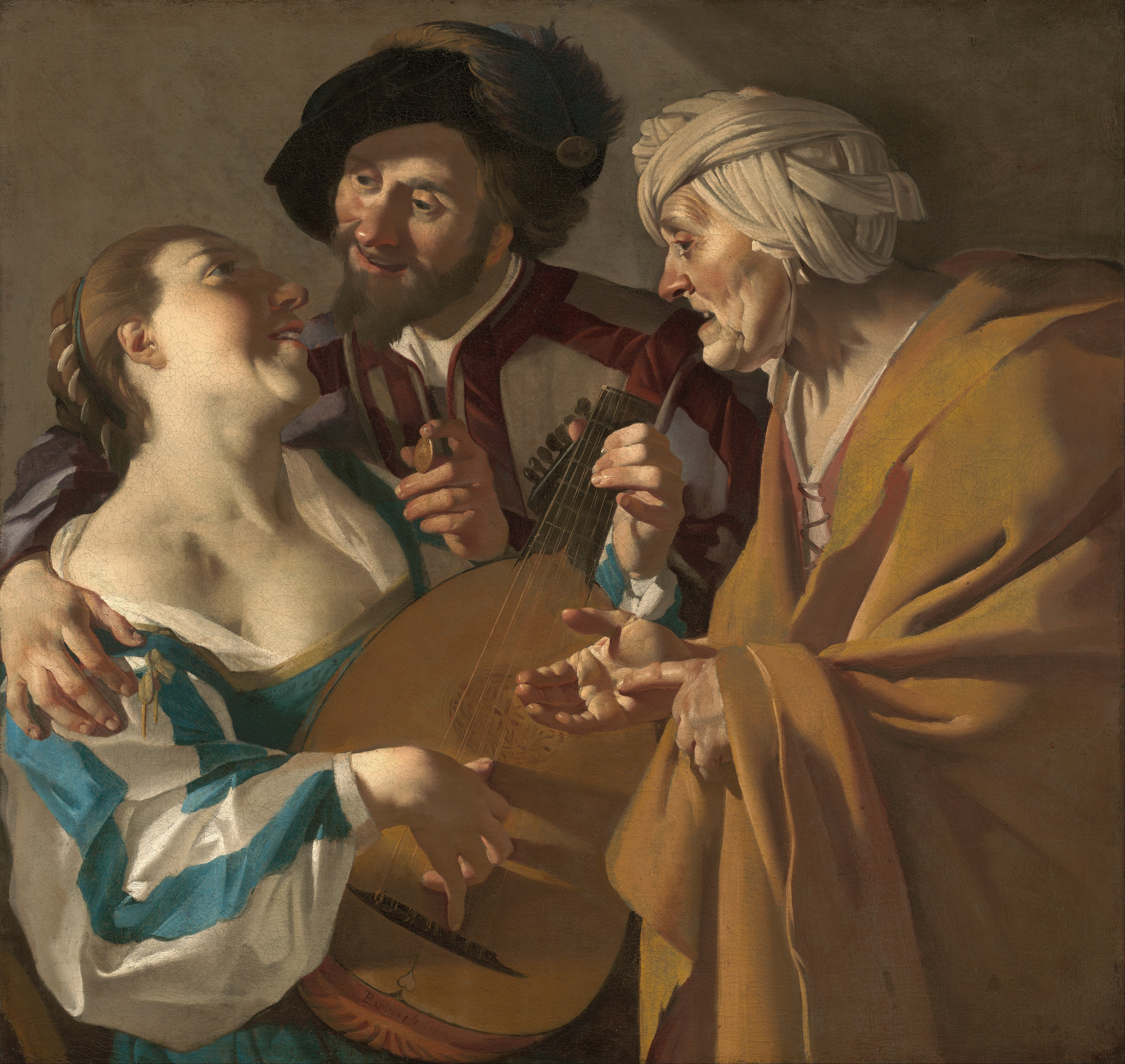
The Procuress by Dirck van Baburen, 1622

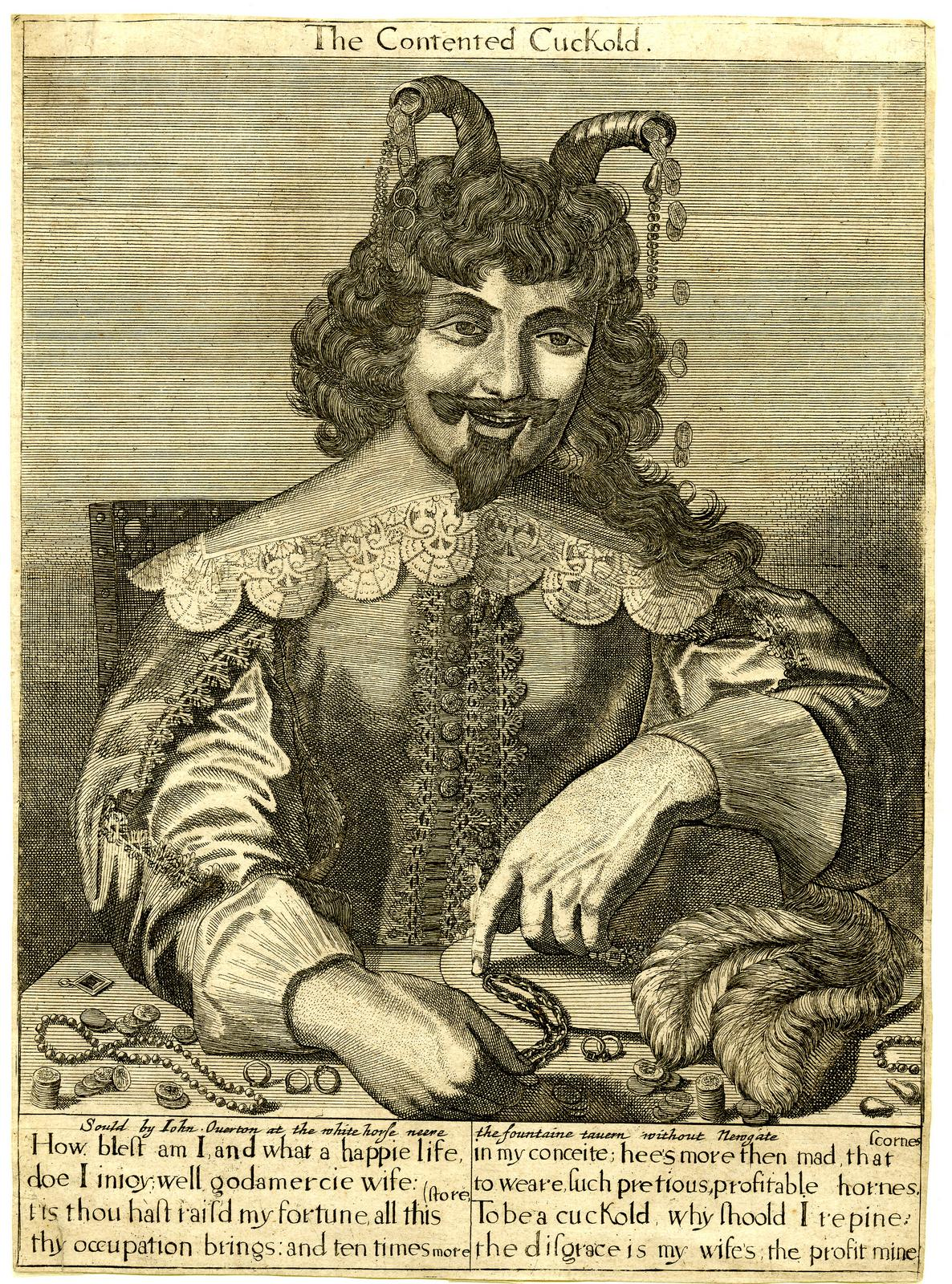
An English engraving from 1673 titled "The Contented Cuckold". The final line reads "the disgrace is my wife's; the profit mine".

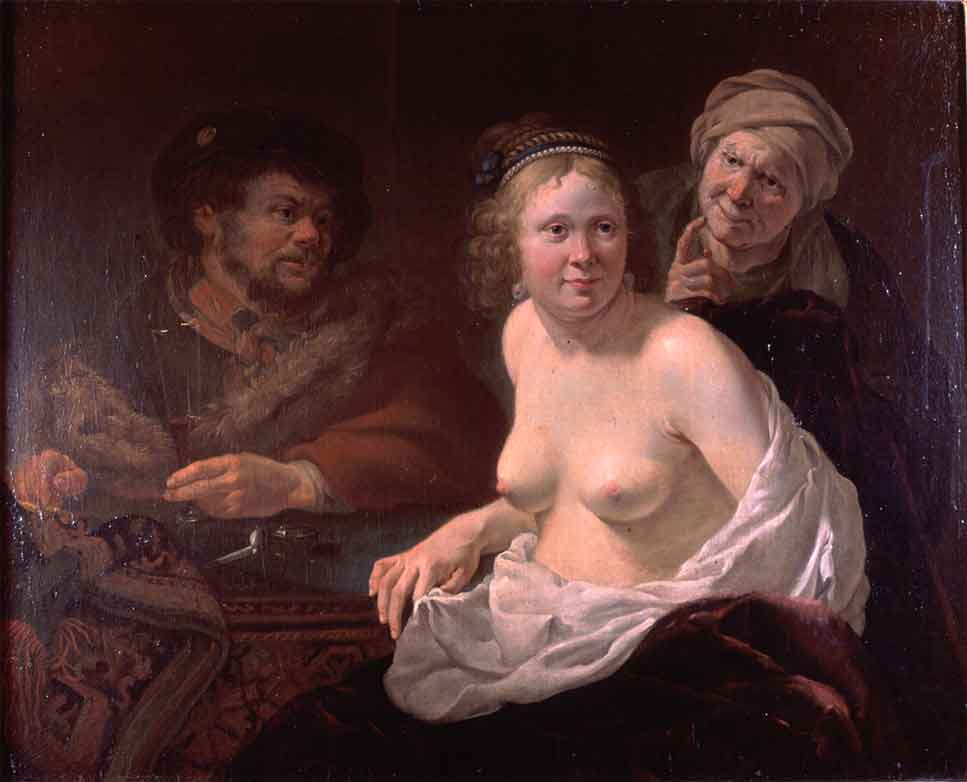
The procuress by Jan G. van Bronckhorst, 1636–1638

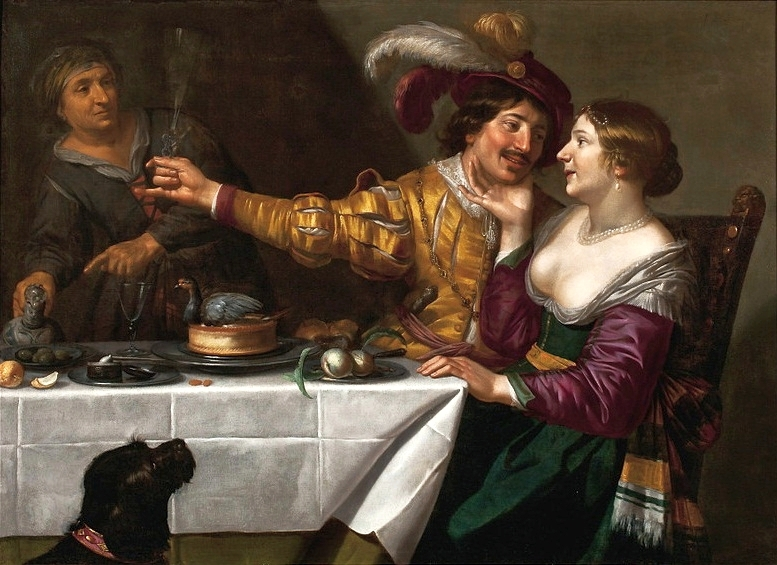
At the procuress, by Jan van Bijlert, second quarter of 17th century

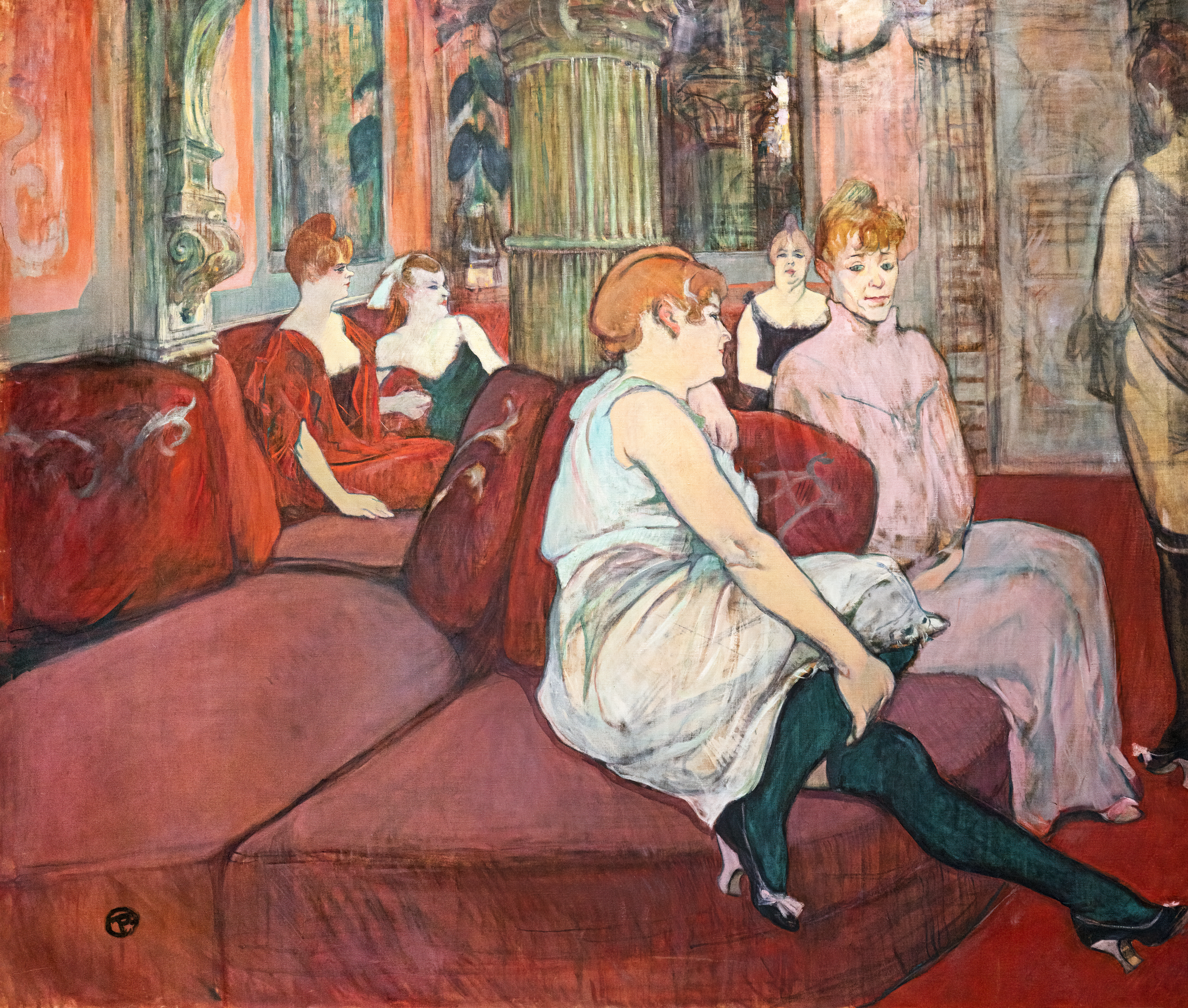
In Salon of Rue des Moulins, (La Fleur blanche), by Henri de Toulouse-Lautrec, 1894

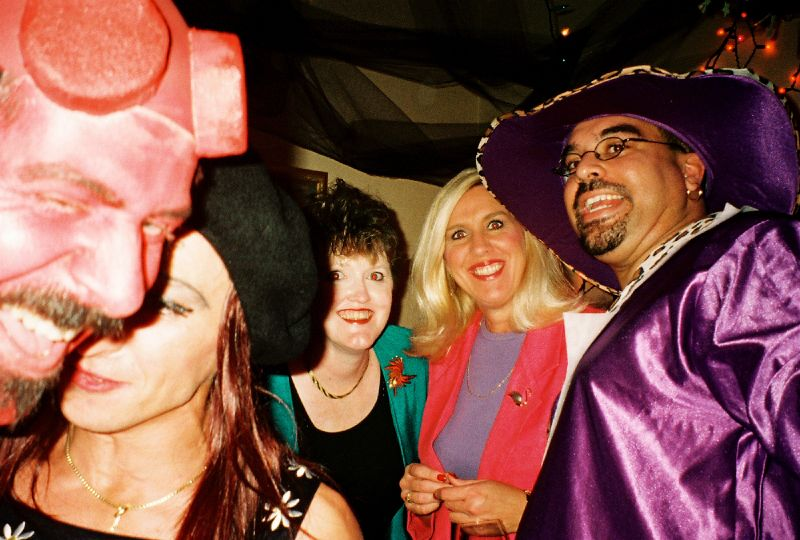
A man (far right) dressed as a pimp and women dressed as "hoes" at a Halloween party, 2000

== Works ==
In 1999, the Hughes brothers released a documentary titled American Pimp consisting of first-person interviews with people involved in pimping in the United States.

== See also ==
- Brothel
