= Mary-Anne Kenworthy =

Australian brothel owner

Maryanne Kenworthy
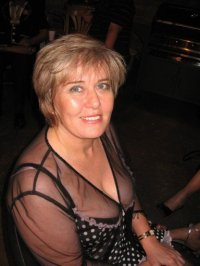
- Born: 25 May 1956 (age 70); Rotorua, New Zealand
- Occupation: Madam
- Known for: Langtrees founder
- Children: 4

Mary-Anne Kenworthy (born 25 May 1956, in Rotorua, New Zealand) is a Western Australian brothel owner and businesswoman. Kenworthy is an advocate for the legalisation of prostitution and improving the rights of sex workers.

Kenworthy's business projects include media interests such as TV and Internet. Until 2022 she owned Langtrees 181 Kalgoorlie. She owns Langtrees VIP Perth and Langtrees VIP Canberra.

Born in New Zealand, Kenworthy entered the sex industry there in 1981 at age 26. She had three children at the time. In 1983, she travelled to Australia on holidays and purchased her first non-containment escort agency in Midland, the Agency Escorts & Moonlight Escorts. In 1984 Kenworthy was accepted into the WA Containment system with the permission of Detective Sergeant Gage.

In 1992, Kenworthy relocated to Burswood and opened Langtrees of Perth. In 1998 she purchased a brothel in Kalgoorlie. In 2000, Kenworthy reopened it as the Goldfields theme bordello. It was the only functioning tourist bordello. On 6 June 2002, she became an Australian citizen.

In 2012 the Kalgoorlie business closed down. In 2013, Kenworthy opened Langtrees of Kalgoorlie Guest Hotel. In 2015, Kenworthy purchased Darwin Escorts in Darwin, Australia. The business was known as Langtrees VIP Darwin before closing in 2022. In July 2019, she put the Kalgoorlie premises up for sale. It was sold for over $1 million in 2022.

== Awards ==
- Adult Industry Awards - Hall of Fame
