= Mac & Devin Go to High School (soundtrack) =

Soundtrack album / studio album by Snoop Dogg and Wiz Khalifa
- Released: December 13, 2011
- Recorded: 2011
- Studios: 4220 Studios; DSR Studios; Record Plant Recording Studios in (Hollywood, California); Paramount Recording Studios; N. Hale High Studio; Levcon Studios in (Los Angeles, California); La Bren Studios in (Inglewood, California); The G Spot Studios in (Irvine, California)
- Genre: Hip-hop
- Length: 48:36
- Labels: Atlantic; Rostrum; Doggystyle; Fontana
- Producers: Benjy Grinberg (also exec.); Bigg Snoop Dogg (also exec.); Ted Chung (also exec.); Wiz Khalifa (also exec.); Big Jerm; Cardo; Christopher "Drumma Boy" Gholson; E. Dan; Exile; Jake One; Jesse "Corparal" Wilson; Larrance Dopson; Nottz; The Smeezingtons; Warren G; Soopafly

Snoop Dogg chronology
Doggumentary (2011)	Mac & Devin Go to High School (2011)	Stoner's EP (2012)

Wiz Khalifa chronology
Rolling Papers (2011)	Mac & Devin Go to High School (2011)	Taylor Allderdice (2012)

Singles from Mac & Devin Go to High School
- 1. "Young, Wild & Free" Released: October 11, 2011

Professional ratings
Aggregate scores
Source	Rating
Metacritic	68/100
Review scores
Source	Rating
The A.V. Club	(B+)
AllMusic	3.5/5 stars
Consequence of Sound	2.5/5 stars
DJBooth	3/5 stars
The Boston Globe	(favourable)
HipHopDX	3/5 stars
Los Angeles Times	2/4 stars
The New York Times	(favourable)
Rolling Stone	3/5 stars
Spin	(7/10)
XXL	(M)

Mac & Devin Go to High School is the collaborative soundtrack to the film of the same name, as well as a collaborative studio album by American rappers and film stars Snoop Dogg and Wiz Khalifa. It was released on December 13, 2011, by Atlantic Records. The album features guest appearances from Bruno Mars, Juicy J, Curren$y and Mike Posner. The album is supported by the lone hit single, "Young, Wild & Free" (featuring Mars). The album received positive reviews from music critics, who praised Snoop's and Khalifa's technical rapping abilities and production choices. The soundtrack debuted at number 29 on the US Billboard 200, and has been certified gold by the Recording Industry Association of America (RIAA).

== Background ==
Snoop Dogg announced plans for the release of a film, and soundtrack alongside Wiz Khalifa back in January, with the release of the song "That Good", originally intended to be the soundtrack's lead single. Wiz Khalifa spoke on the soundtrack saying "It's a real big deal because nobody's done it like that as far as a veteran in the game, an OG, a pioneer and then the newest, youngest, most exciting dude in rap coming through, and really just giving people a complete project," Wiz said. "I'm a fan of it, separate myself from making it, [I'm] a huge fan of it. Can't wait." As far as the musical vibe of the soundtrack, Snoop described it, "It's something to relax you and get you through the day; it's some real good music. The music is quality, I don't even have no title for it, as far as what kinda music is it, it's centric, it's ...," Dogg said searching for the right words before his partner-in-rhyme lent a hand. "Eclectic," Wiz chimed in.

== Singles ==
"Young, Wild & Free", the soundtrack's lead single which features Bruno Mars, and produced by The Smeezingtons, was released on October 11, 2011. In its first week it sold 159,000 digital copies, debuting at number 10 on the US Billboard Hot 100, and number 44 on the Canadian Hot 100. The music video was filmed on October 19, 2011.

== Commercial performance ==
In his home country of United States, Mac & Devin Go to High School debuted at number 29 on the Billboard 200, selling 38,000 copies in its first week. In Canada, the album debuted at number 96. As of February 2012 the album has sold 107,000 copies in the United States. In 2016 Mac & Devin Go to High School was certified gold by the Recording Industry Association of America (RIAA), for combined album sales, on-demand audio, video streams, track sales equivalent of 500,000.

== Track listing ==
No.	Title	Writer(s)	Producer(s)	Length
1.	"Smokin' On" (featuring Juicy J)	Calvin Broadus; Cameron Thomaz; Jordan Houston; Christopher Golson	Drumma Boy	4:28
2.	"I Get Lifted"	Broadus; Thomaz; Warren Griffin; LaToiya Williams	Warren G	4:52
3.	"You Can Put It in a Zag, I’mma Put It in a Blunt"	Broadus; Thomaz; Aleksander Manfredi	Exile	3:19
4.	"6:30"	Broadus; Thomaz; Dominic Lamb; Brian Holland; Eddie Holland	Nottz	4:10
5.	"Talent Show"	Broadus; Thomaz; Jesse Wilson; Anthony Reyes	Jesse "Corparal" Wilson	4:35
6.	"Let's Go Study"	Broadus; Thomaz; Jacob Dutton	Jake One; Soopafly (co.)	4:05
7.	"Young, Wild & Free" (featuring Bruno Mars)	Broadus; Thomaz; Peter Hernandez; Philip Lawrence; Ari Levine; Christopher Brown; Ted Bluechel; Marlon Barrow; Tyrone Griffin; Keenon Jackson; Nye Lee; Marquise Newman	The Smeezingtons	3:27
8.	"OG" (featuring Curren$y)	Eric Dan; Jeremy Kulousek; Thomaz; Broadus; Shante Franklin	I.D. Labs	4:58
9.	"French Inhale" (featuring Mike Posner)	Broadus; Thomaz; Sam Wishkoski; Dutton; Michael Posner; O'Kelly Isley; Ronald Isley; Rudolph Isley	Jake One	2:39
10.	"It Could Be Easy"	Broadus; Thomaz; Larrance Dopson; Ermias Asghedom	Larrance Dopson of 1500 or Nothin'	4:48
11.	"World Class"	Broadus; Thomaz; Ronald LaTour	Cardo	3:30
12.	"That Good"	Broadus; Thomaz; LaTour	Cardo	3:48
13.	"High School" (bonus track)	Broadus; Thomaz; Dopson	Larrance Dopson of 1500 or Nothin'	3:28
14.	"Dev's Song" (pre-order only)	Thomaz; Dan; Kulousek	I.D. Labs	4:30

== Charts ==
=== Weekly charts ===
Chart (2011)	Peak position
Belgian Albums (Ultratop Heatseekers)	9
US Billboard 200	29
US Top R&B/Hip-Hop Albums (Billboard)	6
US Top Rap Albums (Billboard)	3
US Soundtrack Albums (Billboard)	3

=== Year-end charts ===
Chart (2012)	Position
US Top R&B/Hip-Hop Albums (Billboard)	42
US Soundtrack Albums (Billboard)	14

== Certifications ==
Region	Certification	Certified units/sales
United States (RIAA)	Platinum	1,000,000^{‡}
^{‡} Sales+streaming figures based on certification alone.
