= Fillmore Slim =

American blues vocalist, guitarist and pimp

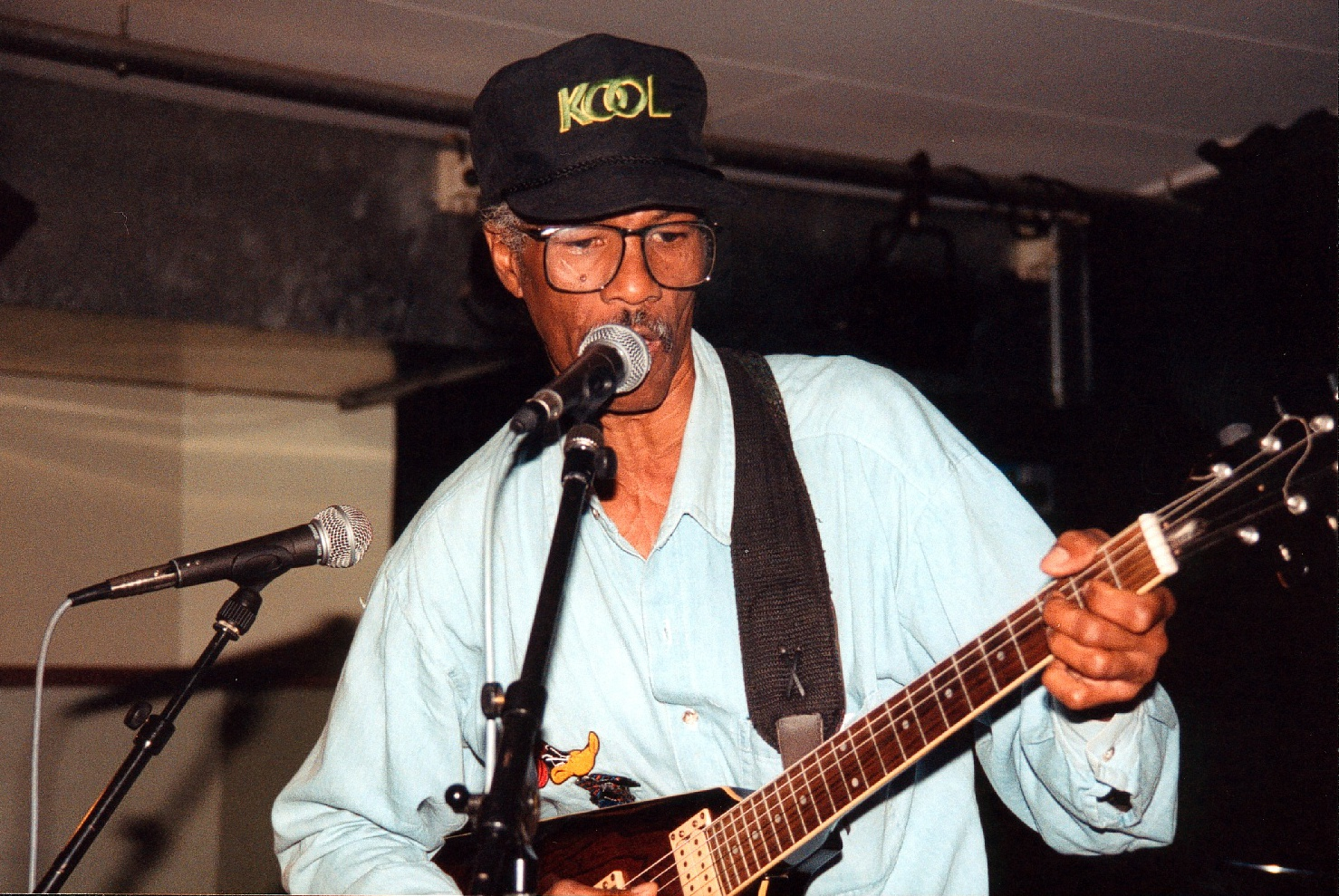
- Playing at the Utrecht Blues Estafette in 2003

Background information
- Born: Clarence Sims; November 7, 1934 (age 91); New Orleans, Louisiana, United States
- Genres: Blues, R&B
- Occupations: Musician, songwriter
- Instruments: Vocals, guitar
- Website: http://www.fillmoreslim.net/

Clarence Sims (born November 7, 1934), best known by his stage name, Fillmore Slim, is an American blues vocalist and guitarist with five albums to his credit. During the 1960s and 1970s, he was also a known pimp in San Francisco, referred to several times as "The West Coast Godfather of the Game" and "The Pope of Pimping".

== Early life ==
Born and raised in Baton Rouge, Louisiana, United States, Fillmore began learning about the blues at an early age. "I done lived the blues," he once said in an interview. "The blues is about picking cotton, working in the fields, living in the streets, and you know I did all these things."

In 1955, he moved to Los Angeles to pursue a musical career, playing by himself in the street and later starting a band called Eddy N and The Blues Slayers. During this time he had a relationship with Etta James before she achieved her fame as a blues singer, and recorded a few 45 rpm records himself. His most successful record from this time was titled "You Got the Nerve of a Brass Monkey".

== Pimping ==
Fillmore's life took a dramatic turn when one night, while playing a blues bar in Midland, Texas, he noticed a young woman who kept coming in and out of the bar. As he tells it, "Finally, she came up to me and said, "I like you. I want you to have this money." I asked her how she got all that money. She finally told me she was a hooker. I asked her what a hooker did, and she broke it on down for me." Upon returning to California, he relocated to San Francisco, bringing the girl along with him for extra income. He continued working as a musician, playing in Fillmore District clubs such as the Trees Pool Hall and the old Fillmore Theater. During this time, he opened for B. B. King and Dinah Washington.

Eventually, however, Fillmore found the lure of pimping too strong and effectively left music behind. He built up a stable of prostitutes and had anywhere from ten to 22 women working Fillmore Street every day. His wardrobe consisted of sharkskin suits, alligator shoes and diamond watches, and he could often be seen cruising up and down Fillmore Street in a new Cadillac. In the documentary American Pimp, Fillmore estimates that, in his entire career as a pimp, he had over 9,000 prostitutes.

== Return to music ==
Fillmore Slim became friends with Eli's owner Troyce Key, who admired Slim's musical stylings and eventually recorded his first album, Born to Sing the Blues (as Clarence "Guitar" Sims), released in 1987.

In 1996, Fillmore Slim updated/re-released, Born to Sing the Blues, on the Mountain Top label. Several years of touring and playing gigs followed, which led to a record deal in 1999 with Fedora Records and an album called Other Side of the Road, released in 2000. Fillmore has released more albums/CDs in the years since with a trilogy of CDs on Mountain Top Records: The Game, The Legend of Fillmore Slim, and The Blues Playa's Ball; that told his story in his own words and music. Fillmore Slim's song writing talents, and musicianship have garnered several awards including being inducted into the Bay Area's West Coast Blues Hall of Fame in 2008, and the Lowell Fulson "Jus' Blues" Award in Memphis in 2011. Since his musical resurgence, Fillmore has found his largest fanbase to be in Europe, where he has played at the Zurich Blues Festival and the Blues Estafette in Utrecht, Holland, and France, among others.

== Discography ==
=== The Blues Playa's Ball (2011) ===
Track list (Disc 1):

1. "Funky Wino"
2. "San Francisco Down on Sixth Street"
3. "Hooker's Game"
4. "The Last Stage of the Blues"
5. "She's Nasty"
6. "Rebecca"
7. "I'd Rather Go Blind"
8. "Bring Back the Funk"
9. "Playing the Blues Around the World"
10. "Thunder and Lightning"

Track list (Disc 2):

1. "Strip Joint"
2. "The Ghetto"
3. "Fannie Mae"
4. "Go Ahead Woman"
5. "Fine French Woman"
6. "Fillmore's Hood"
7. "Ain't That a Shame"
8. "Joe Louis Fan"
9. "Playa's Ball"
10. "I'd Rather Go Blind" [Extended Cut]

=== The Legend of Fillmore Slim: Blues Man / King of the Game (2006) ===
Track list:

1. "The Legend of Fillmore Slim
2. "Trapped by the Devil"
3. "Nosey Woman"
4. "Love for the Third Time"
5. "Hey Little Brother"
6. "Watch Yo' Self"
7. "Jack You Up"
8. "My Friend Blue"
9. "Vegetable Man Intro"
10. "Vegetable Man"
11. "She Don't Love Me"
12. "Blues from the Heart"
13. "Tired of My Old Lady"
14. "Legend of Fillmore Slim Intro"

=== The Game (October 2004) ===
Track list:

1. "The Game" [Rap Version]
2. "Faster Than Time"
3. "Jody"
4. "Down for My Crown"
5. "My First Girlfriend"
6. "Big Brass Monkey"
7. "Can't Get Enough"
8. "Playboy"
9. "Mackin"
10. "Downtown Fresno"
11. "Texas Woman"
12. "The Game" [Blues Version]

=== Funky Mama's House (February 2004) ===
Track list:

1. "Funky Mama's House"
2. "Brown Sugar Eyes"
3. "Street Walker"
4. "Tabby Thomas' Place"
5. "Those Lonely, Lonely Nights"
6. "Ya-Ya"
7. "Down at Eli's"
8. "Stagger Lee"
9. "Earl King"
10. "Saturday Night"
11. "I Cross My Heart"

=== Other Side of the Road (2000) ===
Track list:

1. "Let's Talk About Love"
2. "Dial 911"
3. "Kicked Out"
4. "The Girl Can't Cook"
5. "Down on the Farm"
6. "Annabelle"
7. "Pretty Baby"
8. "Other Side of the Road"
9. "Louisiana Scat"
10. "Blue Monday"

=== Born to Sing the Blues (1998) ===
CD re-release with seven additional tracks (and four omissions from the original vinyl recording). Released as Clarence "Guitar" Sims. Track list:

1. "Minding My Own Business"
2. "King Boy"
3. "Better Man"-
4. "When I Come Home"
5. "Watchdog"-
6. "3rd Rate Love Affair"-
7. "Send Her Home"
8. "Broke Baby"
9. "Lonely Heart and Broken Mind"-
10. "So Much Trouble"
11. "Body Language"-
12. "Things That I Used to Do"-
13. "Sims Boogie"
14. "Better Man" [Alternate Take]
15. Interview with Clarence "Guitar" Sims

=== It's Going to Be My Time After While (1996) ===
Released as Fillmore Sims. Track list:

1. "I'm Broke Baby"
2. "Slippin' Out"
3. "Slow Blues"
4. "All the People I Could Have Been"
5. "I Hear You Cryin'"
6. "Cuttin-N-Loosen"
7. "It's Going to Be My Time After While"
8. "Instrumental"

=== Born to Sing the Blues (1987) ===
Original vinyl release. Released as Clarence "Guitar" Sims. Track list:

1. "She's Gone"
2. "Reap What You Sow"
3. "3rd Rate Love Affair"
4. "Watchdog"
5. "Don't Treat Me Right Blues"
6. "Things I Used to Do" (E. Jones)
7. "(I'll Be A) Better Man"
8. "Hard Luck Blues" (R. Brown)
9. "Body Language"
10. "Lonely Heart and Broken Mind"
