= List of awards and nominations received by Wiz Khalifa =

Wiz Khalifa awards and nominations
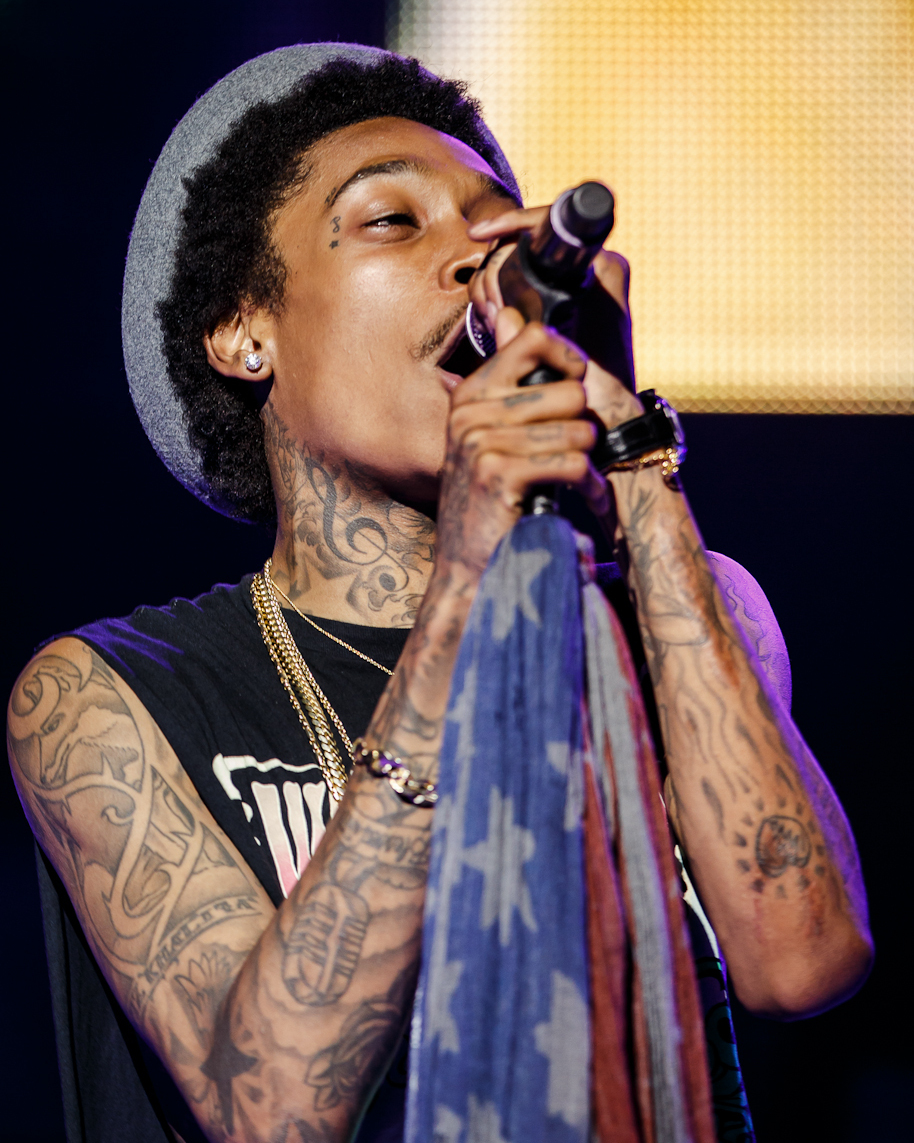
- Khalifa in 2012
Awards and nominations
Award	Wins	Nominations
African-American Film Critics Association	1	1
American Music Awards	0	3
ASCAP Pop Music Awards	3	3
BBC Music Awards	0	1
BET Awards	1	1
BET Hip Hop Awards	2	16
Billboard Music Awards	3	14
Black Reel Awards	1	1
Critics' Choice Movie Awards	1	1
Georgia Film Critics Association	1	1
Golden Globe Awards	0	1
Grammy Awards	0	10
Guild of Music Supervisors Awards	1	1
Hollywood Film Awards	1	1
Hollywood Music in Media Awards	1	2
Houston Film Critics Society	0	1
iHeartRadio MMVAs	0	1
iHeartRadio Music Awards	0	3
Los 40 Music Awards	0	1
Melon Music Awards	1	1
MOBO Awards	0	1
MTV Europe Music Awards	0	7
MTV Video Music Awards	0	5
MTV Video Music Awards Japan	0	3
MTV Woodies	1	1
Myx Music Award	0	1
Nickelodeon Kids' Choice Awards	1	1
NRJ Music Award	1	1
People's Choice Awards	0	5
Pollstar Awards	0	1
Premios Juventud	0	1
Radio Disney Music Awards	0	1
RTHK International Pop Poll Awards	2	2
Satellite Awards	0	1
Space Shower Music Awards	0	1
Stony Awards	1	1
Teen Choice Awards	3	7

Totals (Note: Certain award groups do not simply award one winner. They acknowledge several different recipients, have runners-up, and have third place. Since this is a specific recognition and is different from losing an award, runner-up mentions are considered wins in this award tally. For simplification and to avoid errors, each award in this list has been presumed to have had a prior nomination.)
- Wins: 26
- Nominations: 104

This is a list of awards and nominations received by American rapper Wiz Khalifa.

== Awards and nominations ==
Awards and nominations received by Wiz Khalifa
Award	Year (Note: Indicates the year of ceremony. Each year is linked to the article about the awards held that year, wherever possible.)	Nominee/work	Category	Result	Ref.
African-American Film Critics Association	2016	"See You Again" (featuring Charlie Puth)	Best Song	Won	
American Music Awards	2011	Himself	New Artist of the Year	Nominated	
American Music Awards	2015	"See You Again" (featuring Charlie Puth)	Song of the Year	Nominated	
American Music Awards	2015	"See You Again" (featuring Charlie Puth)	Collaboration of the Year	Nominated	
ASCAP Pop Music Awards	2013	"Payphone" (with Maroon 5)	Most Performed Songs	Won	
ASCAP Pop Music Awards	2013	"Young, Wild & Free" (with Snoop Dogg featuring Bruno Mars)	Most Performed Songs	Won	
ASCAP Pop Music Awards	2016	"See You Again" (featuring Charlie Puth)	Most Performed Songs	Won	
BBC Music Awards	2015	"See You Again" (featuring Charlie Puth)	Song of the Year	Nominated	
BET Awards	2011	Himself	Best New Artist	Won	
BET Hip Hop Awards	2011	Himself	MVP of the Year	Nominated	
BET Hip Hop Awards	2011	Himself	Rookie of the Year	Won	
BET Hip Hop Awards	2011	Himself	Made-You-Look Award (Best Hip Hop Style)	Nominated	
BET Hip Hop Awards	2011	Rolling Papers	CD of the Year	Nominated	
BET Hip Hop Awards	2011	"Black and Yellow"	Best Club Banger	Nominated	
BET Hip Hop Awards	2011	"Black and Yellow"	Verizon People's Champ Award (Viewers' Choice)	Nominated	
BET Hip Hop Awards	2011	"Bright Lights Bigger City"	Sweet 16: Best Featured Verse	Nominated	
BET Hip Hop Awards	2011	"Till I'm Gone"	Sweet 16: Best Featured Verse	Nominated	
BET Hip Hop Awards	2012	Taylor Allderdice	Best Mixtape	Nominated	
BET Hip Hop Awards	2013	"U.O.E.N.O. (Remix)"	Sweet 16: Best Featured Verse	Nominated	
BET Hip Hop Awards	2014	28 Grams	Best Mixtape	Won	
BET Hip Hop Awards	2014	"We Dem Boyz"	Best Hip Hop Video	Nominated	
BET Hip Hop Awards	2014	"We Dem Boyz"	Best Club Banger	Nominated	
BET Hip Hop Awards	2014	"We Dem Boyz"	People's Champ Award	Nominated	
BET Hip Hop Awards	2017	"Ain't Nothing"	Sweet 16: Best Featured Verse	Nominated	
BET Hip Hop Awards	2019	2009 (with Currensy)	Best Mixtape	Nominated	
Billboard Music Awards	2012	Himself	Top New Artist	Won	
Billboard Music Awards	2012	Himself	Top Rap Artist	Nominated	
Billboard Music Awards	2013	"Payphone" (with Maroon 5)	Top Hot 100 Song	Nominated	
Billboard Music Awards	2013	"Payphone" (with Maroon 5)	Top Digital Song	Nominated	
Billboard Music Awards	2013	"Payphone" (with Maroon 5)	Top Radio Song	Nominated	
Billboard Music Awards	2013	"Payphone" (with Maroon 5)	Top Pop Song	Nominated	
Billboard Music Awards	2016	Himself	Top Rap Artist	Nominated	
Billboard Music Awards	2016	"See You Again" (featuring Charlie Puth)	Top Hot 100 Song	Won	
Billboard Music Awards	2016	"See You Again" (featuring Charlie Puth)	Top Selling Song	Nominated	
Billboard Music Awards	2016	"See You Again" (featuring Charlie Puth)	Top Radio Song	Nominated	
Billboard Music Awards	2016	"See You Again" (featuring Charlie Puth)	Top Streaming Song (Video)	Nominated	
Billboard Music Awards	2016	"See You Again" (featuring Charlie Puth)	Top Rap Song	Won	
Billboard Music Awards	2017	"Sucker for Pain"	Top Rock Song	Nominated	
Billboard Music Awards	2023	Himself and Snoop Dogg	Top Rap Touring Artist	Nominated	
Black Reel Awards	2016	"See You Again" (featuring Charlie Puth)	Best Original or Adapted Song	Won	
Critics' Choice Movie Awards	2016	"See You Again" (featuring Charlie Puth)	Best Song	Won	
Georgia Film Critics Association	2016	"See You Again" (featuring Charlie Puth)	Best Original Song	Won	
Golden Globe Awards	2015	"See You Again" (featuring Charlie Puth)	Best Original Song	Nominated	
Grammy Awards	2012	"Black and Yellow"	Best Rap Performance	Nominated	
Grammy Awards	2012	"Black and Yellow"	Best Rap Song	Nominated	
Grammy Awards	2013	"Young, Wild & Free" (with Snoop Dogg featuring Bruno Mars)	Best Rap Song	Nominated	
Grammy Awards	2013	"Payphone" (with Maroon 5)	Best Pop Duo/Group Performance	Nominated	
Grammy Awards	2014	"Remember You" (featuring the Weeknd)	Best Rap/Sung Collaboration	Nominated	
Grammy Awards	2015	"We Dem Boyz"	Best Rap Song	Nominated	
Grammy Awards	2015	Blacc Hollywood	Best Rap Album	Nominated	
Grammy Awards	2016	"See You Again" (featuring Charlie Puth)	Song of the Year	Nominated	
Grammy Awards	2016	"See You Again" (featuring Charlie Puth)	Best Pop Duo/Group Performance	Nominated	
Grammy Awards	2016	"See You Again" (featuring Charlie Puth)	Best Song Written for Visual Media	Nominated	
Guild of Music Supervisors Awards	2015	"See You Again" (featuring Charlie Puth)	Best Song Written and/or Recording Created for a Film	Won	
Hollywood Film Awards	2015	"See You Again" (featuring Charlie Puth)	Hollywood Song Award	Won	
Hollywood Music in Media Awards	2015	"See You Again" (featuring Charlie Puth)	Best Original Song in a Feature Film	Won	
Hollywood Music in Media Awards	2016	"Sucker for Pain"	Best Original Song in a Sci-Fi, Fantasy or Horror Film	Nominated	
Houston Film Critics Society	2016	"See You Again" (featuring Charlie Puth)	Best Original Song	Nominated	
iHeartRadio MMVAs	2013	"Payphone" (with Maroon 5)	International Video of the Year – Group	Nominated	
iHeartRadio Music Awards	2016	"See You Again" (featuring Charlie Puth)	Best Lyrics	Nominated	
iHeartRadio Music Awards	2016	"See You Again" (featuring Charlie Puth)	Best Collaboration	Nominated	
iHeartRadio Music Awards	2016	"See You Again" (featuring Charlie Puth)	Best Song from a Movie	Nominated	
Los 40 Music Awards	2012	"Payphone" (with Maroon 5)	Best International Song	Nominated	
Melon Music Awards	2012	"Payphone" (with Maroon 5)	Best Pop	Won	
MOBO Awards	2011	Himself	Best International Act	Nominated	
MTV Europe Music Awards	2011	Himself	Best New Act	Nominated	
MTV Europe Music Awards	2011	Himself	Best Push Act	Nominated	
MTV Europe Music Awards	2015	Himself	Best Hip Hop	Nominated	
MTV Europe Music Awards	2015	"See You Again" (featuring Charlie Puth)	Best Song	Nominated	
MTV Europe Music Awards	2015	"See You Again" (featuring Charlie Puth)	Best Collaboration	Nominated	
MTV Europe Music Awards	2016	Himself	Best Hip Hop	Nominated	
MTV Europe Music Awards	2016	Himself	Best World Stage Performance	Nominated	
MTV Video Music Awards	2011	"Black and Yellow"	Best New Artist	Nominated	
MTV Video Music Awards	2012	"Payphone" (with Maroon 5)	Best Pop Video	Nominated	
MTV Video Music Awards	2014	"We Dem Boyz"	Best Hip Hop Video	Nominated	
MTV Video Music Awards	2015	"See You Again" (featuring Charlie Puth)	Best Hip Hop Video	Nominated	
MTV Video Music Awards	2015	"See You Again" (featuring Charlie Puth)	Best Collaboration	Nominated	
MTV Video Music Awards Japan	2013	"Payphone" (with Maroon 5)	Best Group Video	Nominated	
MTV Video Music Awards Japan	2013	"Payphone" (with Maroon 5)	Best Collaboration	Nominated	
MTV Video Music Awards Japan	2014	"We Own It (Fast & Furious)" (with 2 Chainz)	Best Video from a Film	Nominated	
MTV Woodies	2011	"Black and Yellow"	Woodie of the Year	Won	
Myx Music Award	2013	"Payphone" (with Maroon 5)	Favorite International Video	Nominated	
Nickelodeon Kids' Choice Awards	2016	"See You Again" (featuring Charlie Puth)	Favorite Collaboration	Won	
NRJ Music Award	2015	"See You Again" (featuring Charlie Puth)	International Song of the Year	Won	
People's Choice Awards	2013	"Payphone" (with Maroon 5)	Favorite Music Video	Nominated	
People's Choice Awards	2016	"See You Again" (featuring Charlie Puth)	Favorite Song	Nominated	
People's Choice Awards	2016	Himself	Favorite Hip-Hop Artist	Nominated	
People's Choice Awards	2017	Himself	Favorite Hip-Hop Artist	Nominated	
People's Choice Awards	2021	Himself	The Competition Contestant of 2021	Nominated	
Pollstar Awards	2012	Himself	Best New Touring Artist	Nominated	
Premios Juventud	2016	"See You Again" (featuring Charlie Puth)	Favorite Hit	Nominated	
Radio Disney Music Awards	2013	"Payphone" (with Maroon 5)	Best Breakup Song	Nominated	
RTHK International Pop Poll Awards	2013	"Payphone" (with Maroon 5)	Top Ten International Gold Songs	Won	
RTHK International Pop Poll Awards	2016	"See You Again" (featuring Charlie Puth)	Top Ten International Gold Songs	Won	
Satellite Awards	2016	"See You Again" (featuring Charlie Puth)	Best Original Song	Nominated	
Space Shower Music Awards	2016	Himself	Best International Artist	Nominated	
Stony Awards	2012	Himself	Stoner of the Year	Won	
Teen Choice Awards	2011	Himself	Choice Music: Breakout Artist	Nominated	
Teen Choice Awards	2012	"Payphone" (with Maroon 5)	Choice Music: Break-Up Song	Won	
Teen Choice Awards	2015	Himself	Choice Music: R&B/Hip-Hop Artist	Nominated	
Teen Choice Awards	2015	"See You Again" (featuring Charlie Puth)	Choice Music: R&B/Hip-Hop Song	Won	
Teen Choice Awards	2015	"See You Again" (featuring Charlie Puth)	Choice Music: Collaboration	Nominated	
Teen Choice Awards	2015	"See You Again" (featuring Charlie Puth)	Choice Music: Song from a Movie or TV Show	Won	
Teen Choice Awards	2015	The Boys of Zummer (with Fall Out Boy)	Choice Music: Summer Tour	Nominated	
