= Say Yeah (Wiz Khalifa song) =

Single by Wiz Khalifa
- Released: April 20, 2008
- Recorded: 2007
- Studio: I.D. Labs
- Genre: Hip hop; Eurodance
- Length: 4:01
- Label: Rostrum; Warner Bros.
- Songwriters: Cameron Thomaz; Johnny Juliano; Eric Dan; Sebastiaan Molijn; Eelke Kalberg
- Producers: Johnny Juliano; E. Dan

Wiz Khalifa singles chronology
| "Pittsburgh Sound" (2007) | "Say Yeah" (2008) | "This Plane" (2009) |

"Say Yeah" is a song by American rapper Wiz Khalifa. Released as Khalifa's third single following his signing to Rostrum and Warner Bros. Records by Director of A&R Kenny “Tick” Salcido and VP of A&R Craig Aaronson, but third in overall, following his first single, "Pittsburgh Sound (All In My Blood)" and “Youngin On His Grind” as a second single. The song was written alongside producers E. Dan and Johnny Juliano. The song heavily samples the 1998 song "Better Off Alone" by Dutch Eurodance group Alice Deejay.

"Say Yeah" peaked at number 11 on the US Billboard Bubbling Under Hot 100 Singles chart. It also reached the top twenty on the US Billboard Hot Rap Songs chart. "Say Yeah" was Khalifa's third single to be released on Warner Bros., as he would later leave the label over disputes regarding the release of his major-label debut studio album. The single was also certified gold by the Recording Industry Association of America (RIAA) for sales of 500,000 copies in the United States.

== Background ==
Rostrum Records president Benjy Grinberg first heard about Wiz Khalifa in 2004 when the rapper's contribution to a mixtape of various new Pittsburgh artists attracted his interest. When Grinberg finally met the 16-year-old artist, he immediately decided he wanted to work with him, later telling HitQuarters: "Even though he wasn't all the way developed you could just tell that he was a diamond in the rough, and that with some polishing, guidance and backing he could become something special." Khalifa signed to the label shortly after and began a seven-year period of artist development. Following hype generated by his 2006 album Show and Prove, Khalifa signed to Warner Bros. Records in 2007. "Say Yeah" was released as his third single with the label in January 2008 via digital download. It was later solicited to US rhythmic radio in March.

In July 2009, Khalifa parted ways with Warner Bros. Records after numerous delays in releasing his planned debut album for the label, First Flight.

== Composition ==
"Say Yeah" is driven around a club beat built around a sample of "Better Off Alone" by Dutch eurodance group Alice Deejay. Over the beat, Khalifa "spins smooth party-oriented rhymes".

== Music video ==
The song's music video was directed by Ara Soudjian and premiered in March 2008.

== Usage in media ==
American mashup artist Girl Talk sampled "Say Yeah" on the track "Don't Stop" from his fourth album, Feed the Animals. The song's vocals are mixed together with the songs "Born Slippy .NUXX" by English electronic group Underworld, "Love in This Club" by American R&B singer Usher and "In Between Days" by English rock band The Cure. Lil B rapped over the instrumental of "Say Yeah' on the track "Thank God I'm Based" from his 2021 mixtape, Santa.

== Track listing ==
- Digital download
1. "Say Yeah" (radio edit) – 3:43
2. "Say Yeah" – 4:01
- CD single
1. "Say Yeah" (album version) – 4:02
2. "Say Yeah" (radio edit) – 3:44
3. "Say Yeah" (instrumental) – 4:02
4. "Say Yeah" (a cappella) – 3:43

== Charts ==
| Chart (2008) | Peak position |
|---|---|
| US Bubbling Under Hot 100 Singles (Billboard) | 11 |
| US Bubbling Under R&B/Hip-Hop Singles (Billboard) | 12 |
| US Hot Rap Songs (Billboard) | 20 |
| US Pop 100 (Billboard) | 96 |
| US Rhythmic Top 40 (Billboard) | 25 |

== Certifications ==
| Region | Certification | Certified units/sales |
|---|---|---|
| United States (RIAA) | Gold | 500,000^{^} |
^{^} Shipments figures based on certification alone.

== Release history ==
| Country | Date | Format | Label |
|---|---|---|---|
| United States | January 22, 2008 | Digital download | Warner Bros. |
| United States | March 17, 2008 | Rhythmic radio | Rostrum; Warner Bros. |
| United States | March 25, 2008 | CD single | Rostrum; Warner Bros. |
