= Stayin Out All Night =

Promotional single by Wiz Khalifa

from the album Blacc Hollywood
- Released: July 28, 2014
- Recorded: 2014
- Genre: Hip hop
- Length: 4:17
- Label: Atlantic, Rostrum
- Songwriter(s): Wiz Khalifa; Nick Ruth; Henry Walter
- Producer(s): Dr. Luke; Cirkut

"Stayin Out All Night" is a song by American rapper Wiz Khalifa. It features production by Dr. Luke and serves as the second promotional single off his fifth studio album Blacc Hollywood.

== Music video ==
The song featured two music videos, both featuring Kahlifa and actress Tia Carrere. One version is an interactive video where the viewer decides how the titular night is spent.

== Track listing ==
- Download digital (Remix)
1. Stayin Out All Night (Boys of Zummer Remix) (duet with Fall Out Boy) — 4:25

== Charts ==
Chart (2014)	Peak position
US Bubbling Under Hot 100 Singles (Billboard)	25
US Hot R&B/Hip-Hop Songs (Billboard)	39
