= Promises (Wiz Khalifa song) =

Promotional single by Wiz Khalifa

from the album Blacc Hollywood
- Released: August 5, 2014
- Genre: R&B, Hip hop
- Length: 3:30
- Label: Atlantic, Rostrum
- Songwriter(s): Wiz Khalifa; Evan Gummo; Rico Love
- Producer(s): Jim Jonsin, Finatik N Zac

"Promises" is a song by American hip-hop artist Wiz Khalifa. It features production by Jim Jonsin and serves as the third promotional single off his fifth studio album Blacc Hollywood.

== Charts ==
Chart (2014)	Peak position
France (SNEP)	125
US Bubbling Under Hot 100 Singles (Billboard)	7
US Hot R&B/Hip-Hop Songs (Billboard)	33

== Certifications ==
Region	Certification	Certified units/sales
United States (RIAA)	Platinum	1,000,000^{‡}
^{‡} Sales+streaming figures based on certification alone.
