= You and Your Friends =

Single by Wiz Khalifa featuring Snoop Dogg and Ty Dolla Sign

from the album Blacc Hollywood
- Released: July 22, 2014
- Length: 3:08
- Label: Rostrum; Atlantic
- Songwriters: Cameron Thomaz; Dijon McFarlane; Calvin Broadus; Tyrone Griffin; Dre Moon
- Producers: DJ Mustard; Mikely Adam

Wiz Khalifa singles chronology
"Shell Shocked" (2014)	"You and Your Friends" (2014)	"See You Again" (2015)

Snoop Dogg singles chronology
"Hangover" (2014)	"You and Your Friends" (2014)	"Vay-K" (2014)

Ty Dolla Sign singles chronology
"Shell Shocked" (2014)	"You and Your Friends" (2014)	"My Main" (2014)

Music video
- "You and Your Friends" on YouTube

"You and Your Friends" is a song by American rapper Wiz Khalifa featuring fellow American rapper Snoop Dogg and American singer Ty Dolla Sign from the former's fifth studio album Blacc Hollywood (2014). It was released on July 22, 2014 by Rostrum and Atlantic Records as the album's second official single. It was produced by DJ Mustard and Mike Free and is a bonus track on the deluxe version of Blacc Hollywood.

== Music video ==
A music video for the song was released on December 22, 2014.

== Charts ==
=== Weekly charts ===
Chart (2014)	Peak position
Australian Urban Singles Chart (ARIA)	14
Germany (Deutsche Black Charts)	3
US Billboard Hot 100	82
US Hot R&B/Hip-Hop Songs (Billboard)	21
US Rhythmic (Billboard)	4

=== Year-end charts ===
Chart (2014)	Position
US Hot R&B/Hip-Hop Songs (Billboard)	80

== Certifications ==
Region	Certification	Certified units/sales
United States (RIAA)	Platinum	1,000,000^{‡}
^{‡} Sales+streaming figures based on certification alone.
