= Ghost Loft =

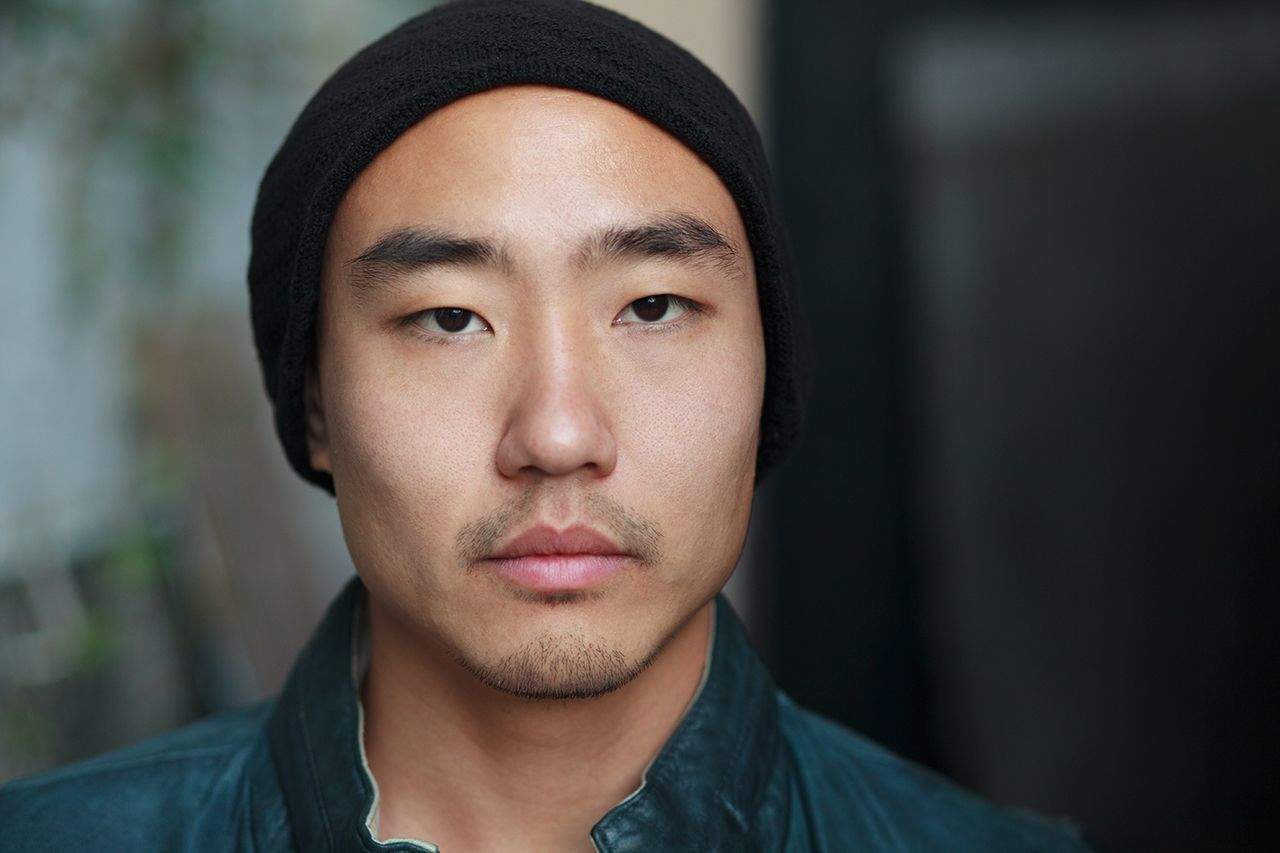

Background information
- Born: Danny Choi
- Origin: Los Angeles
- Genres: Electronic, Alternative
- Occupations: Musician, record producer
- Instruments: Vocals, keyboard, synthesizer, sampler, drum machine, sequencer
- Website: Official Website

Danny Choi, better known by his stage name Ghost Loft, is an American recording artist, record producer, and songwriter based in Los Angeles.

His genres include electronic music and R&B. He has remixed tracks from artists such as Two Door Cinema Club and The Neighbourhood.

== Career ==
Ghost Loft's debut single "Seconds" received widespread blog coverage throughout 2012–2013, and has been played on UK national radio by DJs including Annie Mac. "Seconds" was also added to Triple J rotation, after being selected as "Catch of the Day" by radio host Zan Rowe.

In 2013, Ghost Loft's "So High" was released on the compilation Kitsuné AMERICA 2 by French record label Kitsuné. Ghost Loft is featured on a Wiz Khalifa version of "So High" on the rapper's 2014 album, Blacc Hollywood. He received a Grammy nomination in the category of Best Rap Album for the 57th Annual Grammy Awards. Prior to the album's release, Wiz Khalifa unveiled the mixtape "28 Grams" on May 25, 2014, featuring the track "The Last," which samples Ghost Loft's "Seconds".

In 2016, Ghost Loft produced the opening music for Justin Bieber's Purpose World Tour.

Released on 23 May 2018, Chicago rapper Juice Wrld's debut album, Goodbye & Good Riddance, includes the track "Scared of Love (with instrumental by Ghost Loft)," featuring Ghost Loft and containing a sample of "So High".

In 2021, Ghost Loft collaborated with the fashion house Louis Vuitton, producing the entire soundtrack for their video game titled "Louis: The Game."

== Awards and nominations ==
Award	Year	Recipient(s) and nominee(s)	Category	Result	Ref.
Grammy Award	2014	Blacc Hollywood	Best Rap Album	Nominated	

== Discography ==
=== Singles ===
- "Seconds" (2013)
- "So High" (2013)
- "Be Easy" (2014)
- "Talk to Me" (2014)
- "Overflow" (2015)
- "The Otherside" (2015)
- "Barely Breathing" (2016)
- "Holding On" (2017)
- "Burn Slow" (2017)
- "End of the Light" (2018)
- "Bless Up" (2018)

=== Featured In ===
- "So High" (Wiz Khalifa featuring Ghost Loft) (2014)
- "The Last (Wiz Khalifa featuring Ghost Loft) (2014)
- "Scared Of Love (with instrumental by Ghost Loft)" (Juice WRLD featuring Ghost Loft) (2018)

=== Productions ===
- "So High" (Wiz Khalifa featuring Ghost Loft) (2014)
- Gilbere Forte – "Fall For Nothing (feat. Nylo)" from PRAY (2013)

=== Remixes ===
- jj – "Beautiful Life" (2012)
- Icky Blossoms – "Heat Lightning" (2012)
- Louis Brennan – "The Towpath" (2012)
- The Neighbourhood – "Let It Go" (2013)
- Little Daylight – "Overdose" (2013)
- The High Wire – "Lnoe" (2013)
- Two Door Cinema Club – "Handshake" (2013)
- Joel Compass – "Astronaut" (2013)
- RÁJ – "Ghost" (2013)
- Ryn Weaver – "Octahate" (2014)
- Janine – "Hold Me" (2015)
- MICHL – "When You Loved Me Least" (2016)
- R3hab – "Icarus" (2016)

=== Appearances ===
- Kitsuné America 2 – "So High" (CD, 2013 Kitsuné Music)
- Blacc Hollywood – "Wiz Khalifa - So High" (CD, 2014 Atlantic Records)
