= Float Away =

Float Away may refer to:

- Float Away, a 2005 album by Andrea Lewis
- Float Away, a 2006 song by Robbie Rivera
- Float Away, a song from the 2013 Donora album Play Nice
