= Shell Shocked (song) =

2014 music single

Single by Juicy J, Wiz Khalifa and Ty Dolla $ign featuring Kill the Noise and Madsonik (Note: Moxie Raia is also featured on the song, but she was only credited in the film's end credits.)
- Released: July 22, 2014
- Recorded: 2014
- Genre: Hip-hop; electro house; trap
- Length: 3:26
- Label: Atlantic
- Songwriters: Brian Tyler; Seann Bowe; Tyrone Griffin, Jr.; Jordan Houston; Laura Raia; Jake Stanczak; Cameron Thomaz
- Producers: Madsonik; Kill the Noise

Kill the Noise singles chronology
"Recess" (2014)	"Shell Shocked" (2014)	"Louder" (2015)

Wiz Khalifa singles chronology
"Bigroom Blitz" (2014)	"Shell Shocked" (2014)	"You and Your Friends" (2014)

Juicy J singles chronology
"Dark Horse" (2014)	"Shell Shocked" (2014)	"Low" (2014)

Ty Dolla Sign singles chronology
"Next to It" (2014)	"Shell Shocked" (2014)	"You and Your Friends" (2014)

Music video
- "Shell Shocked" on YouTube

"Shell Shocked" is a song by American musicians Juicy J, Wiz Khalifa, and Ty Dolla $ign featuring fellow American musicians Kill the Noise and Madsonik, released on July 22, 2014 for the film Teenage Mutant Ninja Turtles. The song also features vocals from American singer-songwriter Moxie Raia, who was only credited as an artist in the film's credits. The song was written by all artists involved alongside Seann Bowe.

Madsonik (Brian Tyler), who composed the score for the film, was asked to create a song for the film's credits. At first he invited Kill the Noise for an electronic track, and the result had what Madsonik described as "this groove going, and it sounded more like a hip-hop song". Thus they decided to invite some of their favorite rappers, and attracted Juicy J, Wiz Khalifa, and Ty Dolla $ign given they liked the track and were fans of the Ninja Turtles.

A music video for the song was released on July 29, 2014; as of January 2025, it has over 216 million views.

== Chart performance ==
Chart (2014)	Peak position
Australia (ARIA)	14
US Billboard Hot 100	84
US Hot R&B/Hip-Hop Songs (Billboard)	26
US Hot Rap Songs (Billboard)	17

== Certifications ==
Region	Certification	Certified units/sales
United States (RIAA)	Platinum	1,000,000^{‡}
^{‡} Sales+streaming figures based on certification alone.
