= Flight School (mixtape) =

Mixtape by Wiz Khalifa
- Released: April 17, 2009
- Genre: Hip hop
- Label: Rostrum Records

Wiz Khalifa chronology
| Star Power (2008) | Flight School (2009) | How Fly (2009) |

Flight School is the fifth mixtape by American rapper Wiz Khalifa. It was released April 17, 2009, by Rostrum Records. The mixtape features two guest appearances from Chevy Woods (under the stage name as "Kev da Hustla") and John Record.

== Track listing ==
| No. | Title | Length |
|---|---|---|
| 1. | "Intro" | 1:12 |
| 2. | "Boarding Pass" | 2:39 |
| 3. | "Ms. Rightfernow" | 2:54 |
| 4. | "Shame" | 3:41 |
| 5. | "Starstruck (Remix)" | 4:34 |
| 6. | "Dreamer" | 3:23 |
| 7. | "Get Sum" | 3:42 |
| 8. | "Material" | 5:59 |
| 9. | "Teach U to Fly" | 1:54 |
| 10. | "I'm Good" | 2:35 |
| 11. | "Name on a Cloud" | 3:24 |
| 12. | "Wassup" | 1:44 |
| 13. | "Kleenex" (featuring Kev da Hustla) | 3:21 |
| 14. | "Never Ever" | 4:58 |
| 15. | "Soulmate" (featuring John Record) | 4:37 |
| 16. | "Superstar" | 3:19 |
| 17. | "Heart & Soul" | 3:37 |
| 18. | "Take Away" | 4:59 |
| 19. | "Sky High" | 4:02 |
| 20. | "Hollywood Hoes" | 2:14 |
| 21. | "Extra Credit" | 3:26 |
| 22. | "Extra Extra Credit" | 4:06 |
| Total length: | | 58:12 |

== Charts ==
| Chart (2010) | Peak position |
|---|---|
| US Top R&B/Hip-Hop Albums (Billboard) | 97 |
