= So High (Ghost Loft song) =

2013 single by Ghost Loft

Single by Ghost Loft

from the album Kitsuné America 2
- Released: 2013
- Length: 3:06
- Songwriters: Tor Erik Hermansen; Mikkel S. Eriksen; Cameron Thomaz; Danny Choi

Ghost Loft singles chronology
"Seconds" (2013)	"So High" (2013)	"Be Easy" (2014)

"So High" is a 2013 song by American musician Ghost Loft. The song appeared in the compilation Kitsuné America 2 as the first track in the compilation. "So High" was released as the follow-up of Ghost Loft single "Seconds".

== Wiz Khalifa version ==
Wiz Khalifa included a version of the song in his album Blacc Hollywood. The song included additional rap lyrics by Wiz Khalifa and features Ghost Loft. The song released on August 12, 2014 is written by Tor Erik Hermansen, Mikkel S. Eriksen, Cameron Thomaz and Danny Choi and produced by Stargate and Ghost Loft.

"So High"

Promotional single by Wiz Khalifa featuring Ghost Loft

from the album Blacc Hollywood
- Released: August 12, 2014
- Recorded: 2013–2014
- Genre: Hip hop
- Length: 4:09
- Label: Atlantic
- Songwriters: Tor Erik Hermansen; Mikkel S. Eriksen; Cameron Thomaz; Danny Choi
- Producers: Stargate; Ghost Loft

== Charts ==
Wiz Khalifa feat. Ghost Loft version
Chart (2014)	Peak position
France (SNEP)	109
US Hot R&B/Hip-Hop Songs (Billboard)	36

== Certifications ==
Wiz Khalifa feat. Ghost Loft version
Region	Certification	Certified units/sales
United States (RIAA)	2× Platinum	2,000,000^{‡}
^{‡} Sales+streaming figures based on certification alone.
