= Blacc Hollywood =

- Standard edition cover

Studio album by Wiz Khalifa
- Released: August 18, 2014
- Studio: I.D. Labs
- Genre: Trap
- Length: 53:46
- Labels: Rostrum; Atlantic
- Producers: Arthur McArthur; Brian Soko; Choppa Boi; David Versis; Detail; DJ Mustard; Dr. Luke; Dre Moon; Finatik N Zac; Ghost Loft; I.D. Labs; J Gramm; Jim Jonsin; JMike; Juicy J; Kane Beatz; Luca Polizzi; Micah J. Foxx; Ned Cameron; Purps; Rasool Ricardo Diaz; Sledgren; Sonny Digital; StarGate; The Beat Bully

Wiz Khalifa chronology
28 Grams (2014)	Blacc Hollywood (2014)	Cabin Fever 3 (2015)

Singles from Blacc Hollywood
- 1. "We Dem Boyz" Released: February 11, 2014; 2. "You and Your Friends" Released: July 22, 2014

Blacc Hollywood is the fifth studio album by American rapper Wiz Khalifa. It was released in the UK on August 18, 2014 and in the US a day later, by Rostrum Records and Atlantic Records. The album features guest appearances from Ty Dolla $ign, Juicy J, Project Pat, Curren$y, Ghost Loft, Chevy Woods, and Nicki Minaj, among others. The album was supported by two official singles: "We Dem Boyz" and "You and Your Friends". "We Dem Boyz" peaked at number 43 on the US Billboard 200 and was certified Platinum by the Recording Industry Association of America (RIAA).

== Background ==
On June 24, 2013, Wiz Khalifa announced the title to his third major label (fifth overall) studio album, called Blacc Hollywood, and this project would be featuring some collaborations from American pop singer Miley Cyrus and his label-mate Juicy J. On June 30, 2014, Khalifa posted his Instagram account, with the cover art and release date for Blacc Hollywood, and he also announced that the album is officially set to be released on August 19, 2014. On May 25, 2014, after posting several "weedmixes" and teasers, and after getting out of jail for the marijuana possession. Khalifa released his twelfth mixtape, titled 28 Grams. In August 2014, in an interview with USA Today, he said that this album will be his best work yet.

== Promotion ==
On February 11, 2014, Wiz Khalifa released the album's lead single, titled "We Dem Boyz". On April 14, 2014, Wiz released the music video for "We Dem Boyz". The song peaking at number 43 on the US Billboard 200 and has since been certified Platinum by the Recording Industry Association of America (RIAA).

On July 15, 2014, the album's first promotional single was released for a song, titled "KK". The song features guest appearances from American Southern hip hop rapper Project Pat and his label-mate Juicy J. On July 15, 2014, the music video was released for "KK" featuring Juicy J and Project Pat.

On July 22, 2014, the album's second official single was released, titled "You and Your Friends". The song featuring guest appearances from his longtime collaborator Snoop Dogg and American singer Ty Dolla Sign. The official music video was released December 23, 2014 and currently has over 64 million views. The song was later certified Gold by the Recording Industry Association of America (RIAA) in June 2016.

On July 28, 2014, the album's second promotional single was released, titled "Stayin Out All Night". The song was produced by Dr. Luke.

On August 5, 2014, the track "Promises", was released as the album's third promotional single. On August 6, 2014, the music video was released for "Promises".

On August 12, 2014, the track "So High" featuring Ghost Loft, was released as the fourth promotional single.

== Critical reception ==
Professional ratings
Aggregate scores
Source	Rating
Metacritic	54/100
Review scores
Source	Rating
AllMusic	3.5/5 stars
The A.V. Club	D
Consequence of Sound	C
Exclaim!	6/10
The Guardian	3/5 stars
HipHopDX	3/5 stars
Now	3/5 stars
Slant Magazine	2/5 stars
Spin	5/10
XXL	3/5 (L)

Blacc Hollywood was met with generally mixed reviews from music critics. At Metacritic, which assigns a normalized rating out of 100 to reviews from critics, the album received an average score of 54, which indicates "mixed or average reviews", based on 16 reviews. Luke Fox of Exclaim! said, "Blacc Hollywood, an LP titled like it might bring some overarching theme, is the audio equivalent of the Transformers quadrilogy: a series of in-your-face, mass-appeal blockbusters that lure crowds and teach them nothing." Bruce Smith of HipHopDX stated, "While the misses hold Blacc Hollywood back from being great, Wiz still reminds listeners that regardless of what they’re looking for, he’s capable of providing." Jesse Cataldo of Slant Magazine said, "This sense of puzzled division remains the only really interesting thing about Blacc Hollywood, an album that's remarkable only as a ghostly portrait of a half-formed figure prowling the fringes of success." Jordan Sowunmi of Now said, "Blacc Hollywood peaks when Wiz reverts to the hopeful, aspirational tone that powered his initial rise: the Curren$y-featuring House In The Hills combines an up-by-my-bootstraps narrative with palpable incredulity at his success. It’s the hit-chasing emcee at his most compelling: personal, endearing and undeniably heartfelt."

David Jeffries of AllMusic said, "Stoned immaculate with a self-professed monthly weed bill of ten-thousand dollars, Wiz Khalifa isn't the type of rapper to make clear-headed, well-defined albums, but his fifth studio effort gets back to serious, sullen business often enough that it almost has a theme." Michael Madden of Consequence of Sound stated, "At a time when so many A-list rappers are looking to outdo each other creatively, Wiz is sticking to his guns, and they’re jamming up." Brandon Soderberg of Spin said, "Blacc Hollywood could be worse or lazier or just plain longer, but Wiz is a master of half-assed hedging. You're not going to expect more from him than you get here, and by standing for so little Wiz somehow remains relevant." Evan Rytlewski of The A.V. Club stated, "On “No Gain,” Khalifa misuses his favorite L-word again, insisting, “Man, I work hard, literally,” but there's no evidence of hard work on Blacc Hollywood."

== Commercial performance ==
Blacc Hollywood debuted at number one on the US Billboard 200 chart, selling 90,000 copies in its first week. It serves as Wiz Khalifa's first album to debut at number one on the chart. In its second week, the album fell to number six on the Billboard 200, selling 30,000 copies. The album spent three consecutive weeks on the top-ten of the Billboard 200. As of January 2016, the album has sold 327,000 copies. On June 22, 2016, Blacc Hollywood was certified Gold by the Recording Industry Association of America (RIAA).

In Canada, the album debuted at number one on the Canadian Albums Chart, selling 5,300 copies.

In 2014, Blacc Hollywood was ranked as the 93rd most popular album of the year on the Billboard 200.

== Track listing ==
Credit adapted from album's booklet.

No.	Title	Writer(s)	Producer(s)	Length
1.	"Hope" (featuring Ty Dolla Sign)	Cameron Thomaz; Eric Dan; Jeremy Kulousek; Zachary Vaughan; Ned Cameron; Tyrone Griffin, Jr.	ID Labs; N. Cameron; Ricky P	5:24
2.	"We Dem Boyz"	Thomaz; Noel Fisher; Maurice Brown	Detail; Choppa Boi	3:44
3.	"Promises"	Thomaz; Rico Love; James Scheffer; Michael Mule; Isaac DeBoni	Jim Jonsin; Finatik N Zac	3:30
4.	"KK" (featuring Project Pat and Juicy J)	Thomaz; Scheffer; Mule; DeBoni; Niko Marzouca; Patrick Houston; Jordan Houston	Jim Jonsin; Finatik N Zac	4:09
5.	"House in the Hills" (featuring Currensy)	Thomaz; Dan; Kulousek; Vaughan; Edward Murray; Shante Franklin	ID Labs; Sledgren	4:52
6.	"Ass Drop"	Thomaz; Scheffer; Mule; DeBoni	Jim Jonsin; Finatik N Zac	2:46
7.	"Raw"	Thomaz; Murray	Sledgren	3:37
8.	"Stayin Out All Night"	Thomaz; Lukasz Gottwald; Nick Ruth; Henry Walter	Dr. Luke; Cirkut; Nick Ruth	4:17
9.	"The Sleaze"	Thomaz; Jeremy McArthur; David DaRosa	Arthur McArthur; David Versis^{[b]}	4:25
10.	"So High" (featuring Ghost Loft)	Thomaz; Mikkel Eriksen; Tor Hermansen; Danny Choi	StarGate; Ghost Loft	4:09
11.	"Still Down" (featuring Chevy Woods and Ty Dolla Sign)	Thomaz; Dan; Kulousek; Vaughan; Griffin, Jr.; Kevin Woods	ID Labs	4:16
12.	"No Gain"	Thomaz; Dan; Kulousek; Vaughan	ID Labs	4:19
13.	"True Colors" (featuring Nicki Minaj)	Thomaz; Daniel Johnson; Jeremy Coleman; Luca Polizzi; Brian Soko; Andre Proctor; Rasool Diaz; Onika Maraj	Kane Beatz; JMIKE; Luca Polizzi	4:15

Deluxe edition (bonus tracks)
No.	Title	Writer(s)	Producer(s)	Length
14.	"We Dem Boyz (Remix)" (featuring Rick Ross, Schoolboy Q and Nas)	Thomaz; Fisher; Brown	RMB Justize; Sledgren; Ricky P	5:19
15.	"You and Your Friends" (featuring Snoop Dogg and Ty Dolla Sign)	Thomaz; Griffin, Jr.; Dijon McFarlane; Calvin Broadus, Jr.	DJ Mustard; Mike Free	3:08

Target exclusive (bonus tracks)
No.	Title	Writer(s)	Producer(s)	Length
16.	"On Me" (featuring Jeezy)	Thomaz; Anthony Tucker; Maurice Jordan; Jermaine Preyan; Jay Jenkins	The Beat Bully	4:03
17.	"Word On the Town" (featuring Juicy J and Pimp C)	Thomaz; Houston; Chad Butler	Juicy J; Lil Awree; Crazy Mike	4:09
18.	"Incense"	Thomaz; Nathaniel Caserta; Julian Gramma	Purps; J Gramm^{[a]}	3:11

Track notes

- ^{^[a]} signifies a co-producer.
- ^{^[b]} signifies an additional producer.

== Personnel ==
Adapted from AllMusic.

- Mikely Adam – producer
- Big Jerm – engineer
- Tim Blacksmith – executive producer
- Shari Bryant – marketing
- Nathan Burgess – assistant engineer, guitars, mixing assistant
- Greg Gigendad Burke – art direction, design
- Ned Cameron – producer
- Mike Caren – A&R
- Cirkut – instrumentation, producer, programming
- Kemion Cooks – producer
- Curren$y – featured artist
- Danny D. – executive producer
- Detail – producer
- Dr. Luke – instrumentation, producer, programming
- Andrew Drucker – engineer
- Will Dzombak – executive producer
- Eric Dan – mixing
- Dvora Engelfield – publicity
- Mikkel Storleer Eriksen – engineer, instrumentation
- Finatik 'n' Zac – guitars, keyboards, producer, programming
- Rachael Findlen – assistant engineer
- Lanre Gaba – A&R
- Chris Gehringer – mastering
- Ghost Loft – featured artist, instrumentation, producer
- Clint Gibbs – engineer
- Riggs Morales – A&R
- Brianna Harrison – marketing
- Tor Erik Hermansen – instrumentation
- Ghazi Hourani – assistant engineer
- ID Labs – producer
- J. Mike – producer
- Jim Jonsin – guitars, keyboards, producer, programming
- Juicy J – featured artist
- Ashley Kalmanowitz – publicity
- Kane Beatz – producer
- Miko Lim – photography
- Rico Love – producer
- Sydney Margetson – publicity
- Robert Marks – mixing
- Niko Marzouca – engineer
- Arthur McArthur – producer
- Dijon McFarlane – producer
- Nicki Minaj – featured artist
- Cameron Montgomery – assistant engineer
- Nas – featured artist
- Ryan Neitznick – guitar
- Ricky P. – producer
- Project Pat – featured artist
- Dana Richard – assistant engineer, mixing assistant
- Terry Richardson – cover photo
- Daniela Rivera – assistant engineer, engineer
- Rmbjustize – producer
- Rick Ross – featured artist
- Nick Ruth – instrumentation, producer, programming
- ScHoolboy Q – featured artist
- Sledgren – producer
- Snoop Dogg – featured artist
- Stargate – producer
- Brian Sumner – engineer
- Phil Tan – mixing
- Ty Dolla $ign – featured artist
- David Versis – additional production
- Miles Walker – engineer
- Wiz Khalifa – executive producer, primary artist
- Chevy Woods – featured artist
- Natalie Young – A&R
- Gabriel Zardes – engineer

== Charts ==
=== Weekly charts ===
Chart (2014)	Peak position
Belgian Albums (Ultratop Flanders)	46
Belgian Albums (Ultratop Wallonia)	40
Canadian Albums (Billboard)	1
Danish Albums (Hitlisten)	28
Dutch Albums (Album Top 100)	56
French Albums (SNEP)	31
German Albums (Offizielle Top 100)	12
Hungarian Albums (MAHASZ)	8
Italian Albums (FIMI)	41
Scottish Albums (Official Charts)	48
Swedish Albums (Sverigetopplistan)	46
UK Albums (Official Charts)	27
UK R&B Albums (Official Charts)	3
US Billboard 200	1
US Top R&B/Hip-Hop Albums (Billboard)	1

=== Year-end charts ===
Chart (2014)	Position
US Billboard 200	93
US Top R&B/Hip-Hop Albums (Billboard)	23
US Rap Albums (Billboard)	10

Chart (2015)	Position
US Billboard 200	106
US Top R&B/Hip-Hop Albums (Billboard)	46

== Certifications ==
Region	Certification	Certified units/sales
Canada (Music Canada)	Gold	40,000^{‡}
Denmark (IFPI Danmark)	Gold	10,000^{‡}
United States (RIAA)	Platinum	1,000,000^{‡}
^{‡} Sales+streaming figures based on certification alone.

== Release history ==
Region	Date	Format(s)	Label
United Kingdom	August 18, 2014	CD, digital download	Atlantic
United States	August 19, 2014	CD, digital download	Atlantic, Rostrum
United States	September 30, 2014	Vinyl	Atlantic, Rostrum
