= Deal or No Deal (album) =

Studio album by Wiz Khalifa
- Released: November 24, 2009
- Genre: Hip hop
- Length: 53:55
- Label: Rostrum; iHipHop; Fontana
- Producer: Benjy Grinberg (exec.); Chuck Wilson (exec.); Domingo Neris (co-exec.); I.D. Labs; Josh Everette; Johnny Juliano; Monsta Beatz; Sledgren; Ryan M. Tedder; Andrew Clifton

Wiz Khalifa chronology
Show and Prove (2006)	Deal or No Deal (2009)	Kush & Orange Juice (2010)

Professional ratings
Review scores
Source	Rating
Yo! Raps	3.5/5 stars
HipHopDX	3/5 stars
PopMatters	4/10 stars
IHipHop	3.5/5 stars

Deal or No Deal is the second studio album by American rapper Wiz Khalifa. It was released on November 24, 2009, by Rostrum Records and iHipHop Distribution. I.D. Labs produced most of the tracks throughout the whole album, alongside a variety of several record producers such as Johnny Juliano, Monsta Beatz and Sledgren, among others. The album was promoted by a lead single, "This Plane".

Upon its release, the album sold 5,900 copies in its first week. To date, the album sold 167,000+ copies in the United States.

== Singles ==
The album was promoted by a lead single, called "This Plane". The track was produced by Eric Dan, who's a member of the production team I.D. Labs.

== Track listing ==
No.	Title	Producer(s)	Length
1.	"'Bout Ya'll" (featuring Josh Everette)	Josh Everette; Eric Dan (I.D. Labs)	4:00
2.	"Chewy"	Josh Everette; Eric Dan (I.D. Labs)	3:09
3.	"Friendly" (featuring Curren$y)	Monsta Beatz	3:25
4.	"Goodbye"	Johnny Juliano	3:14
5.	"Hit tha Flo"	Eric Dan (I.D. Labs)	3:02
6.	"Lose Control"	Josh Everette; Eric Dan (I.D. Labs)	3:34
7.	"Moola and the Guap" (featuring Lavish and L.C.)	Sledgren	4:32
8.	"Studio Lovin'"	Johnny Juliano	4:19
9.	"Right Here" (featuring Josh Everette)	Sledgren	4:14
10.	"Red Carpet (Like a Movie)"	Ryan M. Tedder; Andrew "Drew" Clifton	3:34
11.	"Superstar"	Johnny Juliano	3:22
12.	"Take Away"	Big Jerm (I.D. Labs)	3:21
13.	"This Plane"	Eric Dan (I.D. Labs)	3:16
14.	"Who I Am"	Sledgren; Exchange Student (co.)	3:31
15.	"Young Boy Talk"	Sledgren	3:23

== Charts ==
Chart (2010)	Peak position
US Top R&B/Hip-Hop Albums (Billboard)	25
US Top Rap Albums (Billboard)	10
