= We Dem Boyz =

Single by Wiz Khalifa

from the album Blacc Hollywood
- Released: February 11, 2014
- Recorded: 2013
- Genre: Trap
- Length: 3:46
- Label: Rostrum; Atlantic
- Songwriters: Cameron Thomaz; Noel Fisher; Kemion Cooks; Brian Maurice Brown
- Producers: Detail; Choppa Boi

Wiz Khalifa singles chronology
"Party Girls" (2014)	"We Dem Boyz" (2014)	"Bigroom Blitz" (2014)

Music video
- "We Dem Boyz" on YouTube

"We Dem Boyz" is a song by American rapper Wiz Khalifa from his fifth studio album Blacc Hollywood (2014). On February 11, 2014, it was released by Rostrum Records and Atlantic Records as the album's first single. It was produced by Detail and Choppa Boi. The song peaked at number 43 of the US Billboard Hot 100 chart.

== Background and composition ==
On February 6, 2014, Wiz Khalifa released a 15-second preview of "We Dem Boyz", announcing its full release to come in a few days. Wiz Khalifa commented on his reasoning for releasing it as a single saying, "I like 'We Dem Boyz' as the first single because of the energy. It reaches so many audiences other than just a rap audience. It's kind of like how "Black and Yellow" was – a big sports song to get everybody riled. It's more of an anthem."

The song features a boisterous, trap influenced instrumental driven by "thunderous" drums. On top of the production, Wiz Khalifa raps with a subtly autotuned flow.

== Release and promotion ==
On February 10, 2014, the song was premiered through a partnership with music identifying app Shazam. When the preview video was "Shazamed", the song's full audio was unlocked on the app's feed. It was the first song to be premiered by Shazam in history. Then the following day, it was officially released as a digital download.

On February 12, 2014, Wiz Khalifa held a release party for the single in Los Angeles, California. An official video released of the party featured prominent appearances from the song's producer Detail and Taylor Gang Records artist Ty Dolla Sign. On February 19, 2014, Khalifa performed the song live during his appearance on DJ Kay Slay's Streetsweeper Radio show. His first live show performance was on February 13, 2014 on 106 &Park. Then on March 15, 2014, Khalifa performed the song during Taylor Gang's set at SXSW. His next performance of the song was on March 31, on The Arsenio Hall Show.

"We Dem Boyz" was featured in an episode of the TV series Selfie in which Karen Gillan's character twerked to it.

== Critical reception ==
"We Dem Boyz" was met with generally positive reviews from music critics. Complex named it the third best song of the first half of 2014. Writer Insanul Ahmed commented saying, "Driven by a distinctly trap sound and Wiz's Auto-tuned vocals, the song isn't a total overhaul of his style but it is a creative departure for Wiz. It owes more to songs like Lil Reese's "Us," Drake's "Started From the Bottom," and any number of Atlanta's warblers than the stoner raps and pop anthems that have made up much of Wiz's output. Despite the soft start, the song is a club staple now and the biggest street-oriented song Wiz has gotten to pop in years." The song was placed at number eight on Billboard's 10 Best Rap Songs of 2014 list.

== Music video ==
The music video for "We Dem Boyz" was filmed in Atlanta, Georgia on March 11, 2014. The video was then released on April 14, 2014. It features cameo appearances by B.o.B, Big K.R.I.T., Ty Dolla Sign, Young Thug, Chevy Woods, Ty Glascoe, and Rich Homie Quan. The music video was nominated at the 2014 MTV Video Music Awards' Best Hip-Hop Video category, but lost to Drake's R&B song "Hold On, We're Going Home".

== Remixes ==
The official remix of "We Dem Boyz" features Rick Ross, Schoolboy Q, and Nas. It was released on July 3, 2014. On February 18, 2014, American rapper Tyga released a remix to "We Dem Boyz". Then rapper T.I. released his own remix on April 13, 2014. Busta Rhymes and his Conglomerate Records artists O.T. Genasis and J-Doe followed that by releasing a remix on May 5, 2014. Puff Daddy, Meek Mill and French Montana released their own remix on June 18, 2014. On September 11, 2014 the French rapper Rohff release his own Remix "Où est Rohff?". On June 19, 2015 Rapper Plies released his own version of the Track titled "We Dem Boyz P-mix" which actually featured the rapper.

== Usage in media ==
The song was featured on the television shows Selfie, Black-ish, Empire, Ballers, Hawaii Five-O, The Mindy Project and Superstore. It was also featured in the 2015 film Southpaw. This song faced strong resurgence in late 2016, where YouTube's successful content creator Etika falsely leaked the Nintendo Switch while exclaiming "JOY CON BOYZ". He has since made multiple references to this incident, connecting it to this song. It has then spawned types of merchandise related to this event and song, and a new online meme. The song is featured in video games WWE 2K15 and NBA 2K16.

The song was selected as the goal scoring song by Team Canada in the 2016 World Cup of Hockey where Canada went on to win the tournament. The Dallas Cowboys often use the song for promotional purposes, as well as after big plays during home games.

== Awards and nominations ==
Year	Ceremony	Award	Result
2014	2014 BET Hip Hop Awards	Best Hip Hop Video	Nominated
2014	2014 BET Hip Hop Awards	Best Club Banger	Nominated
2014	2014 BET Hip Hop Awards	People's Champ Award	Nominated
2015	2015 Grammy Awards	Best Rap Song	Nominated

== Commercial performance ==
The song only achieved moderate commercial success and failed to outperform the lead singles from Khalifa's previous albums: in the United States, Rolling Papers' lead single "Black and Yellow" peaked at number one and was certified triple Platinum, while O.N.I.F.C.'s "Work Hard, Play Hard" peaked at number 17 and was certified double platinum by the Recording Industry Association of America (RIAA).

== Charts ==
=== Weekly charts ===
Chart (2014–2015)	Peak position
Belgium (Ultratip Bubbling Under Flanders)	27
Belgium Urban (Ultratop Flanders)	22
France (SNEP)	63
Germany (Deutsche Black Charts)	10
UK Singles (Official Charts Company)	193
UK Hip Hop/R&B (Official Charts)	26
US Billboard Hot 100	43
US Hot R&B/Hip-Hop Songs (Billboard)	10
US Hot Rap Songs (Billboard)	4
US Rhythmic Airplay (Billboard)	20

=== Year-end charts ===
Chart (2014)	position
US Hot R&B/Hip-Hop Songs (Billboard)	32
US Hot Rap Songs (Billboard)	18

== Certifications ==
Region	Certification	Certified units/sales
Canada (Music Canada)	Platinum	80,000^{‡}
Denmark (IFPI Danmark)	Gold	45,000^{‡}
United Kingdom (BPI)	Silver	200,000^{‡}
United States (RIAA)	3× Platinum	3,000,000^{‡}
^{‡} Sales+streaming figures based on certification alone.

== Release history ==
Country	Date	Format	Label
United States	February 11, 2014	Digital download	Rostrum Records; Atlantic Records
United States	February 13, 2014	Mainstream urban radio	Rostrum Records; Atlantic Records
United States	June 3, 2014	Rhythmic contemporary radio	Rostrum Records; Atlantic Records
United Kingdom	July 28, 2014	Urban contemporary radio	Rostrum Records; Atlantic Records
