= 28 Grams =

Mixtape by Wiz Khalifa
- Released: May 25, 2014
- Recorded: 2013–14
- Genre: Hip hop
- Length: 72:25
- Label: Taylor Gang; Rostrum
- Producer: Sledgren; Thomaz; Metro Boomin; TM88; I.D. Labs; Ricky P; 808 Mafia; Zaytoven; SAP; Cozmo; JMB Justize; Southside

Wiz Khalifa chronology
O.N.I.F.C. (2012)	28 Grams (2014)	Cabin Fever 3 (2015)

28 Grams is the twelfth mixtape by American rapper Wiz Khalifa. It was released on May 25, 2014, by Taylor Gang Records and Rostrum Records. On the same day, Khalifa was arrested for marijuana possession after security stopped the musician at the airport at El Paso, Texas. He was jailed for a few hours, consequently delaying the release of this mixtape.

== Reception ==
Professional ratings
Review scores
Source	Rating
HipHopDX	2/5 stars
PopMatters	5/10 stars
XXL	2/5 stars

28 Grams was met with mixed reviews from critics. Bruce Smith from HipHopDX gave the mixtape a two out of five, saying "Experimentation and trying new things with an art form are great. However, when the new things one tries are really just catering to popular trends, it’s less experimentation, and more imitation. Thus, 28 Grams is too all over the place, overall and it feels like too much music, too much Auto-tune, and too much music that sounds as though it was already created by someone else." Joe Sweeney from PopMatters gave the album a 5 out of ten, saying "The rapper breaks into his Flava Flav-esque giggle toward the end, and for once, it feels earned."

== Track listing ==
No.	Title	Producer(s)	Length
1.	"Aw Shit"	Sledgren; RMB Justize	3:21
2.	"Maan"	Nez & Rio; Sounwave^{[b]}	3:38
3.	"Let'R"	Metro Boomin; TM88; Southside	3:49
4.	"James Bong"	ID Labs	1:47
5.	"What Iss Hittin"	ID Labs; AdoThaGod	2:10
6.	"Pure"	Ricky P	3:50
7.	"Get That Zip Off"	Will-A-Fool	4:00
8.	"Foreign"	Sonny Digital	3:05
9.	"Incense"	Purps	2:56
10.	"Like Jimmy"	Metro Boomin; Zaytoven	3:01
11.	"Samo"	Ricky P	2:01
12.	"Jim Brown"	Sonny Digital	2:36
13.	"Up Down" (featuring Berner)	DJ Mustard	3:21
14.	"On The Way"	Metro Boomin	2:15
15.	"Word on The Town" (featuring Juicy J and Pimp C)	Juicy J; Lil Awree; Crazy Mike	3:44
16.	"On a Plane"	Cozmo	2:18
17.	"Banger" (featuring Ty Dolla Sign)	Sonny Digital	3:38
18.	"Comb Over"	Ricky P	3:50
19.	"The Last"	SAP	3:08
20.	"Handle My Biz" (featuring J.R. Donato)	Metro Boomin	3:14
21.	"My Nigs" (featuring Currensy)	ID Labs; Shod Beatz	3:07
22.	"How to Be Real" (featuring Curtis Williams)	Southside; TM88	3:07
23.	"Something Special" (featuring Thundercat)	RMB Justize	3:22
24.	"OUY"	Sonny Digital	3:07
25.	"OG Bobby Taylor" (featuring Chevy Woods)	Bobby Johnson	3:50
26.	"Wont Stop" (featuring Tuki Carter)	Metro Boomin	3:12
27.	"The Rain"	Timbaland	3:53
28.	"Different So Fast" (featuring Uzi)	Uzi	3:27

Notes

- ^{^[a]} signifies a co-producer
- ^{^[b]} signifies an additional producer
- Track #2 is a remix of Man of the Year by Schoolboy Q
- Track #7 is a remix of Cut Her Off by K Camp
- Track #13 is a remix of Up Down (Do This All Day) by T-Pain
- Track #15 contains a recycled Pimp C verse from a '06 song titled Let's Get 'Em by Don Fetti
- Track #19 contains a sample of "Seconds", as performed by Ghost Loft
- Track #25 is a remix of OG Bobby Johnson by Que
- Track #27 is a remix of The Rain by Missy Elliott
