= Show and Prove =

Studio album by Wiz Khalifa
- Released: September 5, 2006
- Recorded: 2005–06
- Genre: Hip hop
- Length: 69:22
- Label: Rostrum
- Producer: Benjy Grinberg (exec.); Johnny Juliano; I.D. Labs; Black Czer; Nesia Beatz; The Resource; Champ Super

Wiz Khalifa chronology
Show and Prove (2006)	Deal or No Deal (2009)

Singles from Show and Prove
- 1. "Pittsburgh Sound" Released: 2007

Professional ratings
Review scores
Source	Rating
Allmusic	link
Okayplayer	link
BrainOfHipHop	8.5/10 stars
RapReviews	7/10 link

Show and Prove is the debut studio album by American rapper Wiz Khalifa. It was released on September 5, 2006, by Rostrum Records. Recording sessions took place from 2005 to 2006, with the production primarily provided from I.D. Labs, alongside other record producers from Nesia Beatz and The Resource; as well as guest appearances from Kev da Hustla and Johnny Juliano, among others.

The album was promoted by a lead single, "Pittsburgh Sound". Upon its release, the album received critical acclaim. To date, the album sold 10,000 copies in the United States.

== Recording ==
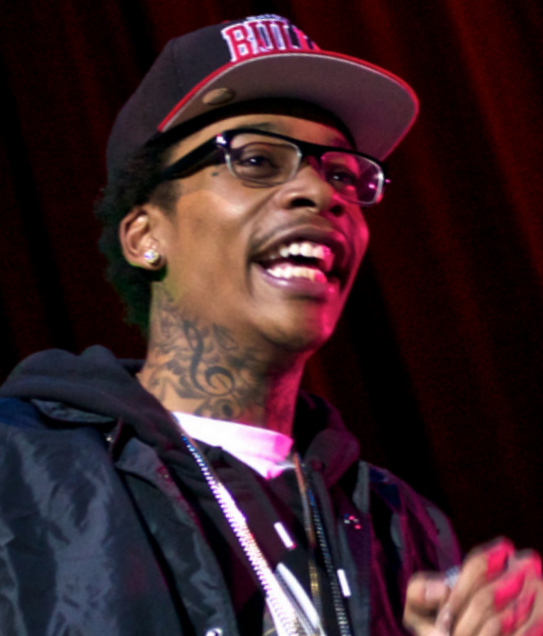
Wiz Khalifa (pictured) announced the album title in 2006 one year after recording Show and Prove.

Khalifa recorded the album in 2005, until 2006 when he announced the album as Show and Improve, he later shortly announced the album short for Show and Prove.

== Singles ==
The album was promoted by a lead single, called "Pittsburgh Sound". The track was produced by The Resource.

== Track listing ==
No.	Title	Producer(s)	Length
1.	"Intro"	I.D. Labs	1:42
2.	"Pittsburgh Sound"	The Resource	3:32
3.	"Bout Mine"	Nesia Beatz	4:22
4.	"I Choose You"	I.D. Labs	3:44
5.	"Damn Thing"	I.D. Labs; Johnny Juliano	3:58
6.	"Keep the Conversation" (featuring Boaz)	Johnny Juliano	4:09
7.	"Stay In Ur Lane"	Black Czer	3:42
8.	"Stand Up" (featuring Kev da Hustla)	Johnny Juliano	3:46
9.	"Too Late"	Johnny Juliano	4:50
10.	"I'm Gonna Ride"	I.D. Labs	3:24
11.	"Gotta Be a Star (Remix)" (featuring Johnny Juliano and S. Money)	Johnny Juliano	4:33
12.	"Let 'Em Know"	I.D. Labs	3:43
13.	"Sometimes" (featuring Vali Porter)	Champ Super; I.D. Labs	4:21
14.	"Locked & Loaded" (featuring Kev da Hustla)	Black Czer	3:58
15.	"Burn Sumthin'"	Johnny Juliano	3:50
16.	"Crazy Since the 80's"	Johnny Juliano	4:41
17.	"History in the Making / Never Too Late"	I.D. Labs	7:07

Notes

- Track 17 includes a hidden track, which appears at the 4:25 mark.
- In some other formats, "Youngin On His Grind / Pittsburgh Sound" were listing as the single track.
