= Donora (band) =

American indie rock band

- Origin: Pittsburgh, Pennsylvania, U.S.
- Genres: Indie pop, indie rock, shoegaze
- Label: Rostrum Records
- Members: Casey Hanner; Jake Hanner; Jake Churton
- Website: www.donoramusic.com

Donora is an American indie pop/rock/shoegaze band based in Pittsburgh, Pennsylvania. They first gained visibility in 2006 as semifinalists in the contest, "Calling All Bands", sponsored by MySpace and Verizon Wireless, for their song "She's Just a Girl".

The trio is composed of vocalist/guitarist Casey Hanner, her brother drummer Jake Hanner, and bassist Jake Churton. The band released their debut album, Donora, in December 2008 on the Pittsburgh-based independent record label Rostrum Records, and received regular airplay on the adult album alternative radio station WYEP-FM. Jake and Casey Hanner are the children of country musician and record producer Dave Hanner, from the country-rock duo Corbin/Hanner; they met Churton while he was recording at their dad's studio with another band.

The band is named after Donora, a town nearly 30 miles south of Pittsburgh, although the band is from Gibsonia, in Pittsburgh's North Hills, nearly 20 miles north of the city. Bethany Hanner, the wife of drummer Jake, saw a road sign for the town and suggested it as the band's name. The band had never been to the town until they performed there as part of a town celebration.

The band released their second album, Boyfriends, Girlfriends, in 2011, followed by their Play Nice EP in 2013.

== Discography ==
- Donora (2009)
- Boyfriends, Girlfriends (2011)
- Play Nice (2013)
- Ha Ha Heart (2014)
- Sun To Me (2017)
