= Rostrum Records =

American independent record label

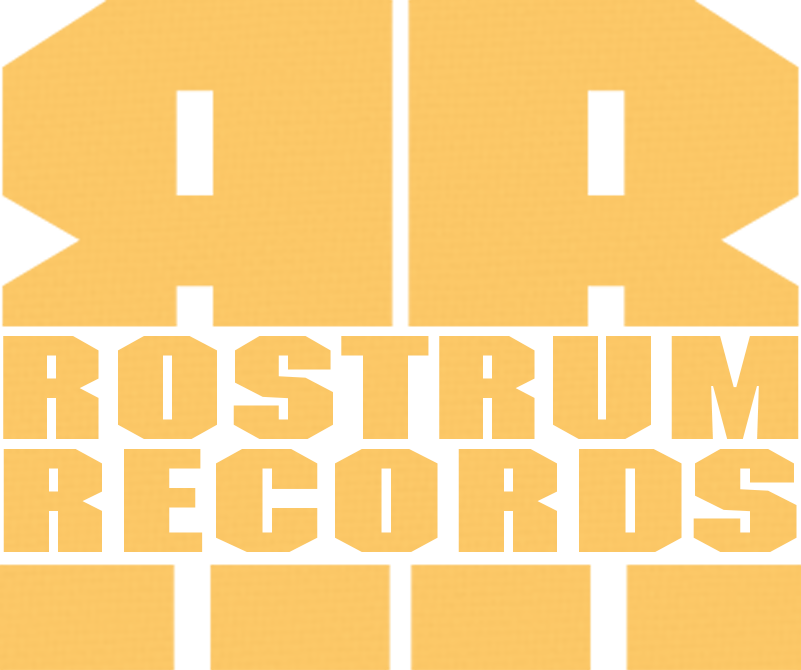
- Founded: 2003; 23 years ago
- Founder: Benjy Grinberg
- Status: Active
- Distributor: Alternative Distribution Alliance (ADA)
- Genre: Hip hop; R&B
- Country of origin: United States
- Location: Los Angeles, California
- Official website: rostrumrecords.com

Rostrum Records is an American independent record label initially located in Pittsburgh, Pennsylvania, and now in Los Angeles, California. Benjy Grinberg is the founder and president of the label, which currently has sixteen artists on its roster, some of the more notable artists being Mac Miller, Wiz Khalifa, Rich the Kid, Mod Sun, Fat Nick, The Bird and the Bee, Donora, Lambo Anlo, TeamMate, Mike Taylor, BRÅVES, Juliann Alexander, and Boaz. Rostrum Records has sold millions of albums and singles, and Rostrum's artists have been nominated for a combined total of eleven Grammy Awards.

Rostrum Records has become one of the leading independent movements in the music industry, and has been at the forefront of artist development for over a decade. Rostrum's innovative digital savvy has helped formulate a new model for the industry. The label was named one of Vibe magazine's "Top 5 Labels to Watch in 2012" and XXL magazine's "Top Rising Indie Label in 2011". Grinberg was named No. 23 on The Source magazine's annual Power 30 list in its September 2011 issue. Rostrum's creative digital strategy and a heavy touring philosophy resulted in the building of a large following for Wiz Khalifa and Mac Miller. The result of Rostrum's efforts were strong social media presences, hundreds of thousands of concert tickets sold, and over half a billion views on both of their YouTube channels.

== History ==
Rostrum began in 2003 while founder Benjy Grinberg was working at Arista Records. Grinberg wanted to be able to develop his own artists and run a label his own way, so he took the lessons he learned from Arista and applied them to a more homegrown situation. When asked his original motivations behind setting up Rostrum Records, Grinberg said "music executives need to be patient with artists and let them develop over time, and so our focus with Rostrum is artist development — finding artists early, and then putting a lot of time and effort into developing the artist across the board, from their shows to their music, their songwriting, their style…everything." Grinberg first heard about Wiz Khalifa in 2004 when the rapper's contribution to a mixtape of various new Pittsburgh artists attracted his interest. When Grinberg finally met the 16-year-old artist, he immediately decided he wanted to work with him, later telling HitQuarters: "Even though he wasn't all the way developed, you could just tell that he was a diamond in the rough, and that with some polishing, guidance, and backing he could become something special." Khalifa signed to the label shortly after and began a seven-year period of artist development.

Wiz Khalifa released two records through Rostrum, Show and Prove in 2006 and Deal or No Deal in 2009. Deal or No Deal, with much assistance from the lead single "This Plane", was especially successful in introducing Khalifa to hip hop fans. To build on the success of Deal or No Deal, Rostrum and Wiz Khalifa then began releasing a series of mixtapes online for free, which began garnering an enormous buzz for Khalifa. Wiz Khalifa released his most popular mixtape "Kush and Orange Juice" for download on June 14, 2010. Due to Khalifa's devoted grassroots fan base, the mixtape became the No. 1 trending topic on Twitter with the hash tag #kushandorangejuice, and "Kush and Orange Juice download" ranked No. 1 on Google's hot search trends. In early 2010, Mac Miller signed with Rostrum Records. Grinberg met Mac Miller while recording with Wiz Khalifa at ID Labs in Pittsburgh. Although Grinberg started giving Miller advice, he did not show interest in getting involved with his career until Miller began work on the K.I.D.S. mixtape, when, as he later told HitQuarters, Grinberg "noticed a maturation in his sound and approach to his music." By that point Miller had started attracting interest from different record companies but chose Rostrum due to its location in his hometown and association with Wiz Khalifa. K.I.D.S. was released by the label in August 2010. The mixtape was inspired by the 1995 film Kids. A significant breakthrough came in late 2010 when Miller embarked on his first tour, the Incredibly Dope Tour, selling out every location. In 2018, Rostrum signed hip hop trio, FREEWIFI with Tha Rift, J plaza and Daddy Dinero. Through Rostrum, they released studio album, Connected.

=== Mainstream success for Wiz Khalifa and Mac Miller ===
With both Wiz Khalifa's and Mac Miller's careers on the rise, Rostrum Records was able to reach new heights in 2011. Wiz Khalifa's single "Black and Yellow" climbed the charts for 18 months before reaching No. 1 on the Billboard Hot 100 on in February 2011, becoming his first No. 1 single. Some of the song's success can be attributed to the Pittsburgh Steelers making it to the Super Bowl. "Black and Yellow" became the team's anthem since the song is an ode to the city of Pittsburgh's black and yellow colors. Mac Miller released the mixtape Best Day Ever on March 11, 2011. Since the release, it has been downloaded over 1,137,000 times and streamed over 1,155,000 times from the official host of the mixtape, DatPiff.com. The first single off Best Day Ever, "Donald Trump" charted on the US Billboard Hot 100 debuting at number 80. While online free as a part of Best Day Ever, "Donald Trump" was still purchased over a million times. In March 2013, "Donald Trump" was awarded a Platinum certification by the RIAA, Mac Miller's first platinum record. On March 29, 2011, Rostrum released Rolling Papers, Wiz Khalifa's major label debut, through a partnership with Atlantic Records. The album capitalized on the success of "Black and Yellow" with subsequent platinum singles "Roll Up", "No Sleep", and "On My Level". Rolling Papers was awarded a Platinum certification in June 2011. Rostrum released Mac Miller's debut studio album Blue Slide Park on November 8, 2011, only eight months after the release of "Best Day Ever". Rostrum Records sold 145,000 copies of Blue Slide Park in its first week, becoming the first independently distributed debut album by an artist to hit No. 1 since 1995.

On December 13, 2011, Wiz Khalifa released Mac & Devin Go to High School a collaborative album with Snoop Dogg, through Atlantic Records & Doggystyle Records, which was the soundtrack to a movie of the same name starring Khalifa and Snoop Dogg. The album's lead single "Young, Wild & Free" (featuring Bruno Mars) debuted at number 10 on the US Billboard Hot 100 chart and has been certified platinum. Just a little under a year later, on December 4, 2012, Wiz Khalifa's ONIFC was released and debuted at number two on the US Billboard 200, selling 141,000 copies in its first week. In 2013, Rostrum Records signed Leon Thomas III from the television show Victorious' to the label. Mac Miller's second album "Watching Movies with the Sound Off" was released through Rostrum on June 18, 2013. Upon its release, the album was met with generally positive reviews from music critics, which praised his new psychedelic hip hop influence and improved lyricism. In its first week, "Watching Movies with the Sound Off" sold 102,000 copies in the United States, debuting at number 3 on the Billboard 200 chart.

=== Departure of Mac Miller; Signing of Mod Sun and The Bird and the Bee ===
On January 14, 2014, Mac Miller and Rostrum Records parted ways, as his original deal with the label had ended. Rostrum released Wiz Khalifa's third album "Blacc Hollywood" on August 19, 2014, with the lead single "We Dem Boyz". The album was a critical success, debuting at number one on the Billboard 200, with first-week sales of 90,453 copies in the United States, making it his first album to take the top spot in its first week. With the departure of Mac Miller, and Wiz Khalifa in a joint deal with Atlantic, Rostrum moved into a new phase of operations to expand their roster. In 2014 and 2015 respectively, Rostrum announced the signing of Minnesota rapper Mod Sun and LA indie-pop duo The Bird and the Bee. Rostrum Records released Mod Sun's debut studio album, Look Up on March 10, 2015, and The Bird and the Bee's first album of original material since 2009 entitled "Recreational Love" on July 17, 2015.

=== "See You Again"; Signing of Goodbye Tomorrow ===
Wiz Khalifa co-wrote and performed "See You Again (feat. Charlie Puth)" for the soundtrack of the 2015 action film Furious 7 as a tribute to Paul Walker. "See You Again" was an enormous global commercial success, becoming Khalifa's biggest hit to date. It peaked at number one on the Billboard Hot 100 for 12 non-consecutive weeks, tying Eminem's "Lose Yourself" for the longest-running rap number-one hit in the country. Later in 2015, Rostrum Records signed Goodbye Tomorrow, an anonymous hip hop collective from Chicago, IL. Rostrum was introduced to the group by producer E. Dan, who has worked closely with Rostrum Records and their roster. E.Dan is a producer and mixer for ID Labs, a Pittsburgh-based recording studio and production team. On August 14, 2015, Rostrum Records released "A Journey Through the Mind of a Non Believer", Goodbye Tomorrow's debut album. E. Dan served as a "musical advisor" for Goodbye Tomrrow, who helped them with the final phase of mixing and by "touching up a few things here and there". On October 7, 2015, the video for Wiz Khalifa's "See You Again" reached over a billion views on YouTube, making it the very first hip-hop song to do so. "See You Again" was nominated for three Grammy Awards at the 58th ceremony: Song of the Year, Best Pop Duo/Group Performance and Best Song Written for Visual Media. As of February 2016, the video for "See You Again" had received over 1.48 billion views, the most viewed video by a rapper ever.

=== Best Day Ever 5th anniversary re-issue; Wiz Khalifa lawsuit ===
On May 31, 2016, Wiz Khalifa filed a $1 million lawsuit against Rostrum Records Founder Benjy Grinberg, alleging that the parties had profited from "virtually every aspect" of his professional life through a 360 deal signed in 2005 when he was a teenager. Khalifa's suit alleged that Grinberg and Rostrum entered into deals with Warner Bros. Records and Atlantic Records for his recordings. Grinberg and Rostrum followed with their own lawsuit a month later, seeking "millions of dollars in unpaid" royalties and earnings from touring and merchandising. Grinberg said his former client's allegations were the "complete opposite of our actions and the antithesis of what Rostrum Records and I stand for."

Wiz Khalifa and Rostrum Records founder Benjy Grinberg, the rapper's former manager, have resolved their lawsuits against each. According to a statement provided to Billboard, "all disputes" have been resolved following a joint settlement agreement.

"This agreement includes the dismissal of lawsuits that each party had previously filed against each other earlier this year," the statement reads. "Both parties are pleased with the outcome and look forward to putting this matter behind them." Financial details of the joint settlement were not disclosed.

On June 3, 2016, Rostrum re-released Mac Miller's breakout mixtape Best Day Ever. The 5th anniversary remastered edition became available on all commercial download and streaming services, as well as vinyl and CD form.

In January 2024, Rostrum acquired the distribution label and retail store, Fat Beats Records.

== Notable artists ==
Act	Studio albums	Year signed
Wiz Khalifa	6	2005
Mac Miller	2	2010
Mod Sun	3	2014
The Bird and the Bee	1	2015
24hrs	1	2019
Innanet James	1	2018
KT Tunstall	2	2017
Cornelius	1	2018
DC the Don	3	2020
Fat Nick	1	2022

== Releases ==
Studio albums

- 2006: Show and Prove (Wiz Khalifa)
- 2008: Donora (Donara)
- 2009: Deal or No Deal (Wiz Khalifa)
- 2011: Boyfriends, Girlfriends (Donora)
- 2011: Rolling Papers (Wiz Khalifa) (Taylor Gang / Rostrum / Atlantic)
- 2011: Blue Slide Park (Mac Miller)
- 2012: O.N.I.F.C. (Wiz Khalifa) (Taylor Gang / Rostrum / Atlantic)
- 2013: Watching Movies with the Sound Off (Mac Miller)
- 2014: Blacc Hollywood (Wiz Khalifa) (Taylor Gang / Rostrum / Atlantic)
- 2014: Ha Ha Heart (Donora)
- 2014: Intuition (Boaz)
- 2015: Look Up (Mod Sun)
- 2015: Recreational Love (The Bird and the Bee)
- 2015: A Journey Through the Mind of a Non Believer (Goodbye Tomorrow)
- 2016: Khalifa (Wiz Khalifa) (Taylor Gang / Rostrum / Atlantic)
- 2016: Best Day Ever (Mac Miller)
- 2017: Movie (Mod Sun)
- 2017: BB (Mod Sun)
- 2018: Mellow Waves (Cornelius)
- 2018: Keep it Clean (Innanet James)
- 2018: WAX (KT Tunstall)
- 2018: Connected (FREEWIFI)
- 2020: Come As You Are (DC The Don)
- 2022: My Own Worst Enemy (DC The Don)
- 2023: FUNERAL (DC The Don)
- 2023: HELLO I'M VULNERABLE (Fat Nick)
- 2026: eXXXotic (DJ Gwalla) (Jet Life / Taylor Gang / 1017 / Rostrum)
- 2026: Kill Bill: Act I - The Tension (DJ Gwalla) (Jet Life / Taylor Gang / 1017 / Rostrum)

EPs

- 2011: On and On and Beyond (Mac Miller)
- 2012: Kiss The Sky (Vali)
- 2013: Paper Charade (Vali)
- 2013: Play Nice (Donora)
- 2013: The Sequel EP (TeamMate)
- 2016: Recreational Remixes (The Bird and the Bee)
- 2016: Feel Good EP (Mike Taylor)
- 2016: III EP (BRÅVES)
- 2016: Nothing's Ever Over Remixes (TeamMate)
