= Stephanie Knows Who =

1966 song by Arthur Lee

- US issue

Single by Love

from the album Da Capo
- B-side: "Orange Skies"
- Released: November 1966
- Recorded: October 2, 1966
- Studio: RCA Victor (Hollywood, California)
- Genre: Psychedelic rock; garage rock
- Length: 2:29
- Label: Elektra
- Songwriter: Arthur Lee
- Producer: Paul A. Rothchild

Love singles chronology
"7 And 7 Is" (1966)	"Stephanie Knows Who" (1966)	"She Comes in Colors" (1966)

"Stephanie Knows Who" is a song written by Arthur Lee and first released by Love on their 1966 album Da Capo. It has also been released on several Love compilation albums. It was to have been released as a single, backed with "Orange Skies", but the single was withdrawn, with "She Comes in Colors" replacing it under the same catalog number. The song was also covered by the Move and the Aardvarks.

== Lyrics and music ==
The song was inspired by a woman approximately 18 years old named Stephanie Buffington, for whom both Lee and Love's guitarist Bryan MacLean had affections. Parts of "The Castle", another song on Da Capo, were inspired by the same woman. Love drummer Michael Stuart-Ware stated that when Lee wrote the song, Stephanie was with him, but by the time the band recorded the song, she was with MacLean. Stuart also believes that the romantic triangle helped lead to the deterioration of the friendship between Lee and MacLean, to the point where Lee tried to expel MacLean from the band. According to guitarist Johnny Echols, the song's lyrics, "A tiger did, you said he did", referred to marks that Lee saw on her side, which she explained as having been caused by a childhood scratch from a tiger, though in fact they were stretch marks from a teenage pregnancy.

The song's music contains jazz elements. AllMusic critic Matthew Greenwald has described the song as "a combination of hard, psychedelic rock with a free jazz interlude." For the interlude, which features Johnny Echols' guitar playing and Tjay Cantrelli's (real name John Barberi) saxophone playing, the time signature shifts from 3/4 to 5/8. Echols has described the song as "a kind of a jazz waltz", though noting that the song isn't very danceable. Stuart-Ware has also commented that the song is hard to dance to.

Although Lee's singing on Love's debut album and Da Capo's lead single "7 and 7 Is" (released months before the album) uses a harsh style, his singing on most of Da Capo uses a softer style. "Stephanie Knows Who" is an exception, and uses the raw singing style of the debut album. However, the instrumentation of the song is more consistent with the rest of Da Capo. For example, Alban "Snoopy" Pfisterer's harpsichord is prominent. The Da Capo instrumentation is particularly evident in the instrumental introduction to the song, which features MacLean's folk music-style guitar playing and Pfisterer's harpsichord.

== Critical reception ==
Greenwald praised the song as being "wonderfully quirky." Music critic Barney Hoskyns has described the song as having garage punk angst. Chris Hollow of The Age described the song as a jewel. Edna Gundersen and Ken Barnes of USA Today described the song as being "among the most attractively sophisticated of the era." Author Domenic Priore considers it a prime example of Lee's "fiery passion" and remarks how the song "breaks into a jazzy solo without losing its rock 'n' roll grit." Author Bob Cianci praised Stuart-Ware's drumming on the song. Colin Larkin called it one of the "strong tracks" on Da Capo. Authors Scott Schinder and Andy Schwartz described Cantrelli's saxophone solo as being in a similar style to John Coltrane.

== Other appearances ==
"Stephanie Knows Who" had been intended as a single release in late 1966, backed with "Orange Skies" and was assigned catalog number EK 45608. However, the single was withdrawn, and "She Comes in Colors", backed with "Orange Skies", was released with catalog number EK 45608 instead. After its original release as a single and on Da Capo, "Stephanie Knows Who" was also included on a number of Love compilation albums, including The Best of Love (1980) and Comes in Colours (1992).

== Personnel ==
- Arthur Lee - vocals, guitar
- Johnny Echols - lead guitar
- Bryan MacLean - rhythm guitar
- Ken Forssi - bass guitar
- Alban "Snoopy" Pfisterer - harpsichord
- Tjay Cantrelli – saxophone
- Michael Stuart-Ware – drums

== Cover versions ==
=== The Move version ===
"Stephanie Knows Who"

Song by The Move

from the EP Something Else from the Move
- Released: June 21, 1968
- Recorded: February 27th, 1968
- Venue: The Marquee Club, London
- Length: 3:02
- Label: Regal Zonophone
- Songwriter: Arthur Lee
- Producer: Denny Cordell

The English power pop group The Move covered "Stephanie Knows Who" on their live EP Something Else from The Move, released on 21 June 1968, through Regal Zonophone Records. The recording is taken from the band's show at the Marquee Club (based in London) on 27 February that same year, with the recording being produced by Denny Cordell.

AllMusic critic Cub Koda describes the Move's version as "a psychedelic number with loads of wah-wah guitar from Roy Wood." AllMusic's Richie Unterberger also commented on the song, specifically its "spinning and frenetic guitar work." The song also appears on other albums by the group, including the 1998 reissue of the band's sophomore studio album, Shazam.

=== The Aardvarks version ===
"Stephanie Knows Who" was also covered by the American garage rock group the Aardvarks, and their recording was released on the various artists compilation album Modstock Saarbrücken 94.
