= Da Capo (Love album) =

Studio album by Love
- Released: November 1966
- Recorded: June 17 and 20, 1966 ("7 and 7 Is"); September 27 – October 2, 1966
- Studios: Sunset Sound (Hollywood); RCA Victor (Hollywood, California)
- Genres: Psychedelia; hard rock; jazz rock; garage rock
- Length: 35:54
- Label: Elektra
- Producers: Paul A. Rothchild; Jac Holzman

Love chronology
Love (1966)	Da Capo (1966)	Forever Changes (1967)

Singles from Da Capo
- 1. "7 and 7 Is" / "No. Fourteen" Released: July 1966; 2. "Stephanie Knows Who" / "Orange Skies" Released: January 1967; 3. "She Comes in Colors" / "Orange Skies" Released: December 1966; 4. "¡Que Vida!" / "Hey Joe" Released: March 1967

Da Capo is the second studio album by American rock band Love, released in November 1966 by Elektra Records. The album was recorded during September and October 1966 at RCA Studios in Hollywood, California, with the exception of lead single "7 and 7 Is", recorded the previous June. The single was a departure for the band and became their highest charting, reaching No. 33 on the Billboard Hot 100. Despite the success of "7 and 7 Is", a string of well received live performances at the time and contemporary critical acclaim for the album upon its release, it peaked at No. 80 on the Billboard 200.

Prior to the album's recording, the band had grown dissatisfied with Elektra and attempted to leave the label but were placated with a cash advance and an increased royalty rate. The album marked several significant changes for the band, including a new studio (RCA), engineer (Dave Hassinger) and producer (Paul A. Rothchild). Additionally, there were several lineup changes in the band, with drummer Alban "Snoopy" Pfisterer moving to keyboards and Michael Stuart recruited to take his place on drums, as well as the addition of jazz saxophonist and flautist Tjay Cantrelli. The songs were composed by frontman Arthur Lee but "rewritten and rearranged in the studio", with the band members developing their own parts.

In contrast to the band's first album, Love (1966), which had been dominated by garage rock and folk rock, Da Capo features a wide range of musical styles, including psychedelia, baroque pop, jazz, Latin music and proto-punk. The album is also regarded as one of the first examples of "jazz rock", and Lee and guitarist Johnny Echols credited jazz musicians Miles Davis and John Coltrane as having influenced the sound. Some critics have considered Da Capo to be a stylistic bridge between Love and their acclaimed third studio album, Forever Changes (1967), regarding Lee's smoother vocal tone and more autobiographical lyrics on Da Capo to be a harbinger of his work on Forever Changes and later Love albums. The album's title derives from the Italian musical term "da capo", meaning "from the beginning".

Da Capo has been included in several critics' record guides and all-time lists, including John Tobler's 100 Great Albums of the Sixties (1994), Colin Larkin's All Time Top 1000 Albums (2000), Tom Moon's 1,000 Recordings to Hear Before You Die (2008) and Robert Dimery's 1001 Albums You Must Hear Before You Die (2005).

== Background ==
=== Conflict with Elektra ===
In March 1966, Love's self-titled debut album, along with the single "My Little Red Book", was released to moderate commercial success, reaching number 57 on the Billboard Top LPs. According to author Barney Hoskyns, the album "trumpeted the presence of a major new musical force on the LA scene". It was also a pivotal release for Elektra Records, giving them their first rock album as well as their first hit single; however, the band quickly grew dissatisfied with the label's production and promotional efforts. In an attempt to get off the label, bandleader Arthur Lee revealed that when he had signed the recording contract on January 4, 1966, he was not yet 21 years old, making the agreement void. This infuriated Elektra president Jac Holzman, who later said: "That was the point in my relationship with Arthur where he moved from being a scoundrel to being totally dishonest ... He said he wasn't making a second album, which meant [if he'd carried out this threat] that Da Capo wouldn't have happened".

An addendum to the contract was made, dated April 25, which gave the band $2,500 in cash and an increase in their royalty rate from 5 to 7 percent; however, it also required them to produce 20 more recordings for Elektra to be released on future albums. Lee later claimed that he also demanded 100% of the publishing rights, but Holzman said this was never agreed on. The contract was then notarized on May 6 to prevent further issues regarding the members' ages; Holzman also ensured that a photocopy of Lee's driver's license was stapled to the document.

=== "7 and 7 Is" and lineup changes ===
On June 17 and 20, Love recorded their second single, "7 and 7 Is". The song was a radical departure from the band's original folk rock sound; biographer John Einarson writes that it was "like nothing anyone had either conceived or heard before ... a loud, aggressive, no-holds-barred, garage-style punk song, a decade before that musical term was current." Despite being a creative success, however, the song's recording sessions, held at Sunset Sound Recorders with Holzman producing and Bruce Botnick engineering, were the last to feature the five-piece lineup of the debut album. Due to drummer Alban "Snoopy" Pfisterer's limited abilities, he and Lee took turns attempting the song's intense drum part. Pfisterer later said: "The session was a nightmare ... I had blisters on my fingers. I don't know how many times I tried to play that damn thing and it just wasn't coming out. Arthur would try it; then I'd try it. Finally I got it. He couldn't do it."

Released in July, "7 and 7 Is" spent ten weeks climbing the Billboard Hot 100, peaking at number 33 and becoming the highest-charting single of the band's career. During that same time, the band decided to make some changes to their lineup for their second album. Reluctant to fire Pfisterer, Lee instead elected to move him over to keyboards – organ, piano, and harpsichord – as he had been classically trained as a child. To replace him on drums, Lee hired Michael Stuart – formerly of the Sons of Adam, who had occasionally opened for Love and had a local hit with one of Lee's songs, "Feathered Fish". Lee then recruited Tjay Cantrelli (born John Barberis), a jazz saxophonist and flautist whom he had crossed paths with in the early 1960s, bringing the band to a seven-piece.

On Stuart's first day with the group, Lee and lead guitarist Johnny Echols brought him to Elektra's offices where, unbeknownst to him, they had planned another attempt to end their commitment with the label. Stuart recalls the encounter in his 2003 autobiography Behind the Scenes on the Pegasus Carousel with the Legendary Rock Group LOVE:

Arthur said [to the executive], "I want to talk to you about releasing us from our commitment to Elektra. You really don't have the capacity to be able to handle our group. What do we have to do to get off the label?" And Johnny said, "Yeah, and your records are made cheaply. Look, you can't do this with any other record," and he took out the vinyl and snapped it in half, throwing it down on the desk. The guy laughed and told them they weren't getting out of their commitment. He said "You owe us three more albums." We walked out.

== Recording and production ==
The sessions for Da Capo began at RCA Victor's studio at 6363 Sunset Boulevard in Hollywood. Echols suggested that the change in studio was due to Sunset Sound being occupied by label-mates the Doors. Andrew Sandoval writes that the new environment provided Love "the right atmosphere" for their new material. Botnick was unable to engineer the sessions due to the change, so the job was instead done by Dave Hassinger, whose "sonic mastery", Sandoval continues, "gave the group further confidence in their work." Echols reported positive recollections of the setting: "Everything was relaxed in there ... It wasn't uptight at RCA as it was at Sunset Sounds. Several times we had fistfights at Sunset Sound, 'cause it was a small kind of claustrophobic type of place. The atmosphere and the people – Bruce and all of that – just was not conductive in the way RCA was with Dave Hassinger."

Paul A. Rothchild, who had just finished the sessions for the Doors' first album in August 1966, was brought in produce Da Capo. The group had been impressed with his previous work and that he had spent time in prison for cannabis possession shortly beforehand. Echols and Botnick both acknowledged that his "no-nonsense" style of producing helped control Lee's often commanding studio presence. Echols said that Lee "could be like a kid, trying to get away with whatever he could. Jac let Arthur get away with that and let him run around. Rothchild wasn't like that. He expected us to pay attention to him, and we did." Holzman praised Rothchild's work, saying that "Da Capo was an artistic stretch, and I think a lot of the reach on that album was provided by Paul." "There's a fair amount of Paul Rothchild on that album", remarked Botnick.

According to Echols, most of the songs on Da Capo "were rewritten and rearranged in the studio", which resulted in them "eating up time in that place". Lee, the band's principal songwriter, presented his new songs by playing the basic chord progressions on his black Gibson acoustic guitar and singing the lyrics. Each member then wrote their own parts, with Lee making suggestions along the way; however, Pfisterer, who was unable to improvise, said that his parts were either written down or "explained to me exactly" by Lee.

Despite Lee's new songs, the first track attempted, on September 27, was rhythm guitarist and secondary songwriter Bryan MacLean's song "Orange Skies". Echols recalled tensions flaring during the session over Cantrelli's flute part: "they kept threatening to call Herbie Mann in because Tjay could not get this part right simply because we were out of tune ... we tuned up to this harpsichord and the harpsichord was off ... They thought it was his fault". The next three days were dedicated to Lee's songs "¡Que Vida!", "She Comes in Colors", and "The Castle", respectively. On October 2, the band recorded "Stephanie Knows Who" before returning to Sunset Sound to finish the album with the side-long track "Revelation". The album was then mixed by Botnick, who felt that Hassinger "made Love sound different than I did" and wanted to ensure that "there would be no differentiation between [his] work and my work."

== Songs ==
=== Overview ===
It was 180 degrees from that first album to Da Capo. It doesn't even sound like the same group. ... On the first album, a lot of those songs were written for dancing. We were playing loud music for young kids at our shows. The second album was a bit more adult; it was for sitting down and listening to. We were real musicians who had honed our chops and could play, so we wanted to do something that would take us away from the pack and stretch us out.

— Johnny Echols

Author William E. Spevack sees Da Capo as an album of varying styles, with each song being a "portrait of a subgenre of rock." According to authors Barney Hoskyns and Robert Dimery, the music on side one incorporates the stylistic influences of psychedelia, baroque pop, jazz, Latin music, and proto-punk. The track "Revelation", which occupies all of side two, combines rock, blues, rhythm and blues, psychedelia, jazz, and classical. Mike Segretto writes that side one "bridges" the garage rock of Love's first album and the "more refined" sound of their next one, Forever Changes; however, "[s]ince those albums are so diametrically unlike, Da Capo sounds totally different from either of them." Segretto also says that the album "pushed Love's hard rock as far as it could go. They could never make a wilder recording than '7 and 7 Is' or a more indulgent one than 'Revelations.' [sic]" Despite Lee's efforts to remove the band from folk rock, critic Richie Unterberger says that the genre is "still evident in the guitar riffs of pretty songs like 'The Castle' and 'She Comes in Colors'".

Da Capo is one of the earliest albums to be described as jazz rock, years before the genre was widely established. Lee attributed the album's jazz influences to him listening to Miles Davis at the time. Although Lee would also come to describe the band's style during this period as jazz rock, he was initially dismissive of the label, saying in a contemporary interview with Hit Parader: "People who listen to music today would probably call it 'jazz rock' but I don't call it that. It's free music. We have to choose material that will fit this group and that's free music. We don't want any patterns; we go completely against the book." Echols cited John Coltrane as an influence on the band's sound, which he termed "free-form fusion." Spevack notes that the album Out of Sight and Sound by the Free Spirits, often considered the first jazz rock record, was released about a month after Da Capo.

Lyrically, Spevack says that Lee "found his voice" on Da Capo, with his "abstract phrases and intelligent theories" being "light years ahead of his lyrics from just a few months earlier." Author Mick Houghton regards Lee's autobiographical lyrics as a "preface" to Forever Changes. The softer songs on Da Capo, namely "Orange Skies" and "The Castle", mark the first appearances of Lee's smoother vocal tone – dubbed "acid-Mathis" by the press – which would continue to be a feature through Forever Changes, Four Sail, and Out Here.

=== Side one ===
==== "Stephanie Knows Who" ====
Lee's inspiration for "Stephanie Knows Who" came from Stephanie Buffington, a young woman whom he and MacLean were both interested in dating. The opening build-up between Pfisterer's harpsichord and MacLean's fingerpicked guitar offers an immediate "marked contrast" from Love's debut album, according to Einarson. The song employs a shifting meter, as the foundation of 3/4 alternates with 4/4 in the transition section and moves to 5/4 for the saxophone solo. Spevack writes that "Lee's relationship lyrics are now layered and denser, lacking any easy linear meanings" and recognizes his raucous vocal performance as "surprisingly poetic" due to him "manipulating the lines to read more artistically than a typical yelling rant." The song was issued as a single in November 1966, backed with "Orange Skies", but was quickly withdrawn and replaced with "She Comes in Colors" in December. A small amount of these original versions were pressed and are sought after by record collectors.

==== "Orange Skies" ====
MacLean claimed that "Orange Skies" was the first song he ever wrote, dating it back to 1965. He was working as a roadie for the Byrds at the time and was inspired by Roger McGuinn's guitar solo from "The Bells of Rhymney". Echols recalled MacLean's original version of the song being "much too choppy and 'show tune-ish' for us to record. So after a lot of changes and rewrites, the song developed into a jazzy, Gary McFarland-like tune, which was in keeping with the tenor of the album as a whole". It is the only song MacLean wrote for Love that he did not also sing on, as it was ultimately decided to be better suited for Lee's voice. With lyrics describing fun in the summertime, Sandoval deems the song "easily the breeziest piece in Love's catalog". Released as the B-sides of "Stephanie Knows Who" and "She Comes in Colors", Echols said that "Orange Skies" "got quite a bit of airplay in Los Angeles" and that the band "thought it would've probably taken off" had they received more promotion from Elektra.

==== "¡Que Vida!" ====
Spevack describes Lee's "¡Que Vida!" as a "Latin-tinged" pop song. Stuart called it "early ska", while Echols characterized the chords as having "an airy Brazilian sound." Critic Matthew Greenwald compares the bossa nova rhythm to the contemporary work of Antônio Carlos Jobim. Although it is the longest song on side one, it has the simplest structure, comprising only four verses and a brief break section. The track also features sound effects – pulled from Elektra's extensive sound library – of a Champagne cork popping and sleigh bells. Lyrically, Segretto says that "¡Que Vida!" is "as reflective as anything on Forever Changes" and Chapman observes that it is "the first of many Lee songs that [end] in quiet menace and unsettling incantation." It was released as a single in March 1967, backed with the band's version of "Hey Joe" from their debut album, but due to little promotion it became their rarest Elektra single.

==== "7 and 7 Is" ====
Lee composed "7 and 7 Is" at the Colonial Apartments in Hollywood, originally as a folk song in the style of Bob Dylan. The title was inspired by Lee's high school girlfriend Anita Billings, as they shared a birthday of March 7. The lyrics describe his domestic life as a child. As the band experimented in the studio with effects such as feedback and fuzz bass, attempting to capture a "controlled chaos" sound, the song evolved into what Spevack deems "one of the 1960s most explosively aggressive songs." The track climaxes with a sound effect of an atomic explosion, although Botnick said it may have been a gunshot slowed down. Afterwards, the song ends with a bluesy coda adapted from "Sleep Walk" by Santo & Johnny. Among the earliest rock songs to influence punk, "7 and 7 Is" is often regarded as Love's greatest performance.

==== "The Castle" ====
"The Castle" is another song that was inspired by Lee's relationship with Stephanie Buffington. The title came from the mansion the group shared in the Los Feliz area of Los Angeles. Although the lyrics are sparse, consisting of only three brief verses, the band fills out the song with an unusual structure, including an extended instrumental conclusion that features two false endings. Sandoval calls the song "a signpost to the acoustic gentleness (and eventually the dissonant creepiness) of Forever Changes." The song achieved a considerable degree of familiarity in Britain when it was used as the theme tune of BBC One's travel programme series Holiday in 1969.

==== "She Comes in Colors" ====
According to Echols, "She Comes in Colors" was inspired by another one of Lee's girlfriends, named Annette Ferrel, who "would always wear bright, colorful clothing". Lee later claimed that the title referred to a woman's menstrual cycle; however, Sandoval says that the seriousness of this is unknown. Echols also remembered it being "the most difficult song that we did" due to its "strange" chords. The structure of the guitar intro – beginning softly and building up when hitting the chorus – anticipates alternative rock of the 1990s. The song was released as a single in December 1966, replacing "Stephanie Knows Who" as the A-side of "Orange Skies". Although it received heavy airplay in Los Angeles, making the local charts, it failed to appear on the Hot 100. Retrospectively, Unterberger views the song as "perhaps Lee's best composition".

=== Side two ===
==== "Revelation" ====
"Revelation" originated as a jam called "John Lee Hooker" in the band's early live sets. According to Echols, these performances would contain multiple solos and sometimes last for an hour. The controversial decision to devote the entire second side of Da Capo to it has been the subject of much speculation. One rumor is that Lee was holding back his songs from Elektra as a form of revenge for not allowing the band to break their contract with them, although Botnick denied this, saying that it was simply "very popular to do long songs at the time." Echols explained that "[i]t was really down to Elektra not giving us enough time. ... If we had been able to record more, we would have had a different album".

The band recorded 45 minutes of the jam which Rothchild then edited. Pfisterer's harpsichord part, quoting a Partita by Johann Sebastian Bach, was spliced onto the beginning and end of the track. The song features soloing from Lee (on harmonica), Echols, Cantrelli, and Stuart. It was the only song on the album that the band disliked in retrospect: Stuart thought it was "a piece of shit" and "a waste of a side of an album", while Lee called it "the worst fucking song I've ever done in my life."

== Title and packaging ==
Keeping with the theme of Love "restarting" their sound, Lee asked Pfisterer, the only member of the band who could read music, the musical term for going back to the beginning, to which he replied with "Da capo". The album's front cover, designed by William S. Harvey, illustrates this theme by showing a framed photo of the band at the same burnt-out house in Laurel Canyon featured on the cover of their first album. According to Stuart, the cover photo captures Lee exhaling from a joint.

The album's back cover photo was taken by Guy Webster in the upstairs office of the Whisky a Go Go. Echols said that it was the only photo shoot the band did where they posed in a studio, because "for every other thing we went outside."

== Release and reception ==
Love unveiled their new lineup and sound to the public with a residency at the Whisky during October 19–30, 1966. According to a contemporary review from the Los Angeles Times, the band attracted "a cream crop of Sunset Strip celebrities who came to judge the change." The shows were, in Spevack's words, "remarkably successful by all accounts", and received rave reviews from the local press. Digby Diehl of the Times referred to the band's sound as "a hypnotic mélange" and further wrote that: "The flute and harpsichord jazz improvisations on numbers such as 'Stephanie Knows Who' and 'Orange Skies' lend a fresh lift to what might be an ordinary rock piece." A later review from the paper placed the band's "clean" presentation and "balance of instruments and roles" with those of the Beatles and Buffalo Springfield. Echols remembered the band's performances with the expanded lineup as "probably the most fun we had playing."

Da Capo was first announced as an album on November 12, 1966, with an advertisement placed by Elektra on page 1 of Billboard magazine. By late January 1967 when Da Capo was listed by Billboard as a "New Action Album", "7 and 7 Is" had already received commercial and critical success, helping to boost the album's sales. It entered the Billboard Top LPs chart on February 11, 1967, and peaked at number 80 on April 8, failing to achieve the commercial success the band had hoped it would. Lee blamed the album's disappointing performance on Elektra, but Botnick disagreed, saying, "Arthur wouldn't go out and promote it!" Stuart later reflected that the band "should have toured behind it"; however, he recognized that Lee "prided himself on being different. If bands toured after releasing an album, he would do it differently." Regarding the album as "an undeniably groundbreaking release for 1966" with a style that had "no other context or reference in [rock] up to that point", Einarson asks if Lee had "overestimated his own audience with a body of music perhaps too complex and esoteric for their tastes". In the observation of writer Jim Bickhart, "by that point, Arthur had shown he was kind of oblivious to who his audience was and how to appeal to them ... he was not thinking, 'I'm going to bring my audience along with me,' he was just thinking, 'I'm going to do what I'm going to do.'"

Da Capo received favorable recognition from contemporary reviewers. David Harris of Mojo-Navigator called it "a great advance" over Love's debut album and recognized their "integration of jazz and [rock] into a new form of music." In a more critical review for Esquire magazine, Robert Christgau felt that, although "7 and 7 Is" was a "perfect rocker", the rest of side one "sounds cluttered and lacks sock", directing the latter criticism to Lee's voice being "more often too sweet for his material." Of "Revelation", Christgau wrote: "It includes excellent guitar and harmonica work and great screaming ... It also includes some mediocre alto sax and (I shudder) a protracted drum solo. A brave stab at a target somewhere between rock and jazz, I think it fails, but it may prove prophetic."

== Legacy ==
Retrospective professional reviews
Review scores
Source	Rating
AllMusic	5/5 stars
Chrysalis CD Guide to Pop & Rock	Sound: Content:
Encyclopedia of Popular Music	4/5 stars
The Great Rock Discography	8/10
Music Story	4/5 stars
MusicHound Rock	4/5
The Rolling Stone Album Guide	4/5 stars

Da Capo has been largely overshadowed by Love's third album Forever Changes, widely regarded as one of the greatest albums of all time. Spevack writes that many fans and critics who have given Forever Changes that title have also declared Da Capo "the perfect album side", and that the decision to devote the entire other side to "Revelation" instead of a potential six further songs from Lee or MacLean has resulted in Love "only having one universally beloved masterpiece LP and not two." Writing for AllMusic, Richie Unterberger said that although side one stands as "a truly classic body of work", side two keeps the album as a whole from attaining that status. Mike Segretto called the album "frustrating" due to it not "follow[ing] through on its tremendous promise." He said that the first side "may be the best run of Love songs the band ever recorded", and that the album may have ended up being their best if the second side "had some songs on it." Despite this, Segretto said that the strength of side one still set the album "well above the majority of its contemporaries."

The album has been featured in several record guides, such as: John Tobler's 100 Great Albums of the Sixties (1994); Colin Larkin's All Time Top 1000 Albums (2000), where it was voted number 331; Tom Moon's 1,000 Recordings to Hear Before You Die (2008), albeit as a "Catalog Choice" after Forever Changes; and Robert Dimery's 1001 Albums You Must Hear Before You Die (2005). Alice Cooper, who recorded a cover of "7 and 7 Is" for his 1981 album Special Forces, has named Da Capo as one of his favorite albums of all time. Jack White, an avowed Love fan, was inspired to name The White Stripes' second album De Stijl (2000) "because Love called their second album Da Capo."

== Track listing ==
All songs written by Arthur Lee, except "Orange Skies" (Bryan MacLean) and "Revelation" (Lee/MacLean/John Echols/Ken Forssi).

Side one

1. "Stephanie Knows Who" – 2:33
2. "Orange Skies" – 2:49
3. "¡Que Vida!" – 3:37
4. "7 and 7 Is" – 2:15
5. "The Castle" – 3:00
6. "She Comes in Colors" – 2:43

Side two

1. "Revelation" – 18:57

=== 2002 reissue ===
The 2002 CD reissue of Da Capo contains both mono and stereo mixes of the album, as well as the following bonus track:

15. "7 and 7 Is (Tracking session)" – 3:13

== Personnel ==
According to William E. Spevack and Bruno Ceriotti.

Love

- Arthur Lee – lead vocals, rhythm guitar, harmonica, drums, percussion
- John Echols – lead guitar
- Bryan MacLean – rhythm guitar, backing vocals
- Ken Forssi – bass
- Alban "Snoopy" Pfisterer – organ, harpsichord, drums on "7 and 7 Is"
- Tjay Cantrelli – saxophone, flute
- Michael Stuart-Ware – drums

Production

- Paul A. Rothchild – producer
- Jac Holzman – producer, production supervisor
- Bruce Botnick – engineer
- Dave Hassinger – engineer
- William S. Harvey – front cover photography and design
- Guy Webster – back cover photography
