= The Forever Changes Concert =

Live album by Love
- Released: 2003, 2007, 2009
- Recorded: January 15, 2003
- Venues: Royal Festival Hall, London
- Genres: Psychedelic rock, folk rock, baroque pop
- Label: Snapper Music
- Producers: Gene Kraut; Arthur Lee

Professional ratings
Review scores
Source	Rating
AllMusic	3.5/5 stars
Encyclopedia of Popular Music	4/5 stars

The Forever Changes Concert (2003) is the last album released by Love with Arthur Lee. There was a two-CD re-release in 2007 under the name of The Forever Changes Concert & More, which features extra songs, a live video of "Alone Again Or", band images and a screensaver.

== 2003 track listing ==
1. "Alone Again Or" (Maclean, – 4:19)
2. "A House Is Not a Motel" (Lee, – 4:08)
3. "Andmoreagain" (Lee, – 4:04)
4. "The Daily Planet" (Lee, – 3:42)
5. "Old Man" (Maclean, – 3:39)
6. "The Red Telephone" (Lee, – 7:12)
7. "Maybe the People Would Be the Times or Between Clark and Hilldale" (Lee, – 3:57)
8. "Live and Let Live" (Lee, – 5:13)
9. "The Good Humor Man He Sees Everything Like This" (Lee, – 3:42)
10. "Bummer in the Summer" (Lee, – 2:34)
11. "You Set the Scene" (Lee, – 7:40)

=== Bonus tracks ===
1. "7 and 7 Is" (Lee, – 2:51)
2. "Your Mind and We Belong Together" (Lee, – 4:11)
3. "Orange Skies" (MacLean, – 3:09)
4. "She Comes in Colors" (Lee, – 3:00)
5. "Listen to my Song" (Lee, – 2:03)
6. "August" (Lee, – 5:34)

== 2007 track listing ==
=== Disc 1 ===
1. "Alone Again Or" (Maclean, – 4:19)
2. "A House Is Not a Motel" (Lee, – 4:08)
3. "Andmoreagain" (Lee, – 4:04)
4. "The Daily Planet" (Lee, – 3:42)
5. "Old Man" (Maclean, – 3:39)
6. "The Red Telephone" (Lee, – 7:12)
7. "Maybe the People Would Be the Times or Between Clark and Hilldale" (Lee, – 3:57)
8. "Live and Let Live" (Lee, – 5:13)
9. "The Good Humor Man He Sees Everything Like This" (Lee, – 3:42)
10. "Bummer in the Summer" (Lee, – 2:34)
11. "You Set the Scene" (Lee, – 7:40)

=== Disc 2 ===
1. "Orange Skies" (MacLean, – 3:09)
2. "She Comes in Colors" (Lee, – 3:00)
3. "Listen to My Song" (Lee, – 2:03)
4. "August" (Lee, – 5:34)
5. "7 and 7 Is" (Lee, – 2:51)
6. "Your Mind and We Belong Together" (Lee, – 4:11)
7. "Signed D.C." (Lee, – 6:49)
8. "My Little Red Book" (Burt Bacharach, Hal David, – 2:33)
