= Orange Skies =

- US issue

Single by Love

from the album Da Capo
- A-side: "Stephanie Knows Who"; "She Comes in Colors"
- Released: 1966
- Recorded: 1966
- Studio: RCA Victor (Hollywood, California)
- Genre: Psychedelic pop; jazz pop; folk rock
- Length: 2:49
- Label: Elektra
- Songwriter: Bryan MacLean
- Producer: Paul A. Rothchild

"Orange Skies" is a song written by Bryan MacLean and originally recorded in 1966 by the band Love for their second album Da Capo (November 1966). It was first released the same month as the B-side to the band's single "Stephanie Knows Who". The original recording features band leader Arthur Lee on lead vocals instead of MacLean.

== Composition and musical style ==
According to Bryan MacLean, "Orange Skies" was the first song he ever wrote. At the time 17 years old and working as a roadie for The Byrds, he based the song on a section from The Byrds' version of "The Bells of Rhymney", attributing that arrangement to Roger McGuinn. AllMusic critic Matthew Greenwald also detects influences on the song from Rodgers and Hammerstein musicals, and notes a similarity with Stevie Wonder's later song "My Cherie Amour." Greenwald calls it a highlight of Da Capo, describing it as "a soulful, light meditation on falling in love." The flute accompaniment, also used as the main solo instrument, was performed by Tjay Cantrelli (real name John Barbieri).

Writing in The New Rolling Stone Album Guide, Paul Evans called the song "strange and lovely." As described by author Barney Hoskyns, the song uses "Latin rhythms and cool jazz shadings to fashion a kind of spaced-out MOR." Dominic Priore calls it "a beautiful utopian pastiche unmatched in 1960s music."

== Other versions ==
Two demo versions by MacLean (on acoustic guitar and vocals) were released in 1997 on the album Ifyoubelievein. A piano version by his half-sister Maria McKee was released on her album Live – Acoustic Tour 2006. Other artists that have covered this song on record include The Galaxies, Os Baobás (both from Brazil), and The Flower Power (from Gulfport, Mississippi).

== Personnel ==
- Arthur Lee - guitar, percussion
- Johnny Echoes - lead guitar
- Bryan MacLean – vocals, rhythm guitar
- Ken Forssi – bass guitar
- Alban "Snoopy" Pfisterer – organ
- Tjay Cantrelli – flute
- Michael Stuart-Ware – drums
