= Ifyoubelievein =

Studio album by Bryan MacLean
- Released: 1997
- Recorded: 1966–1982
- Genre: Acoustic, lo-fi
- Length: 57:35
- Label: Sundazed

Bryan MacLean chronology
Ifyoubelievein (1997)	Candy's Waltz (2000)

Ifyoubelievein is the first solo album by the American musician Bryan MacLean, released in 1997. It was recorded sporadically from the 1960s to the 1980s. The album is composed entirely of previously unreleased demo recordings.

MacLean was previously known as the rhythm guitarist and second singer-songwriter in the original lineup of the Los Angeles folk rock band Love. The album was assembled of mono demo tapes his mother Elizabeth McKee had found at his home. The album notably includes renditions of his best-known songs from Love's repertoire, namely "Orange Skies", "Alone Again Or" and "Old Man".

The title of the album was styled after the Love song "Andmoreagain", which has been credited as co-written by both band leader Arthur Lee and Bryan MacLean on some releases.

== Critical reception ==
Professional ratings
Review scores
Source	Rating
AllMusic	4/5 stars

The Guardian said that "MacLean's skeletal songs lack Love's speckled sonic flourish but provide curiosity for the same reasons as The Beatles Anthologies."

== Track listing ==
1. "Barber John" (recorded 1967)
2. "Fresh Hope" (recorded 1966)
3. "Kathleen" (recorded 1966)
4. "Orange Skies" (recorded 1966)
5. "Strong Commitment" (recorded 1966)
6. "Alone Again Or" (recorded 1972)
7. "Tired of Sitting" (recorded 1966)
8. "Blues Singer" (recorded 1966)
9. "Friday's Party" (recorded 1982)
10. "People" (recorded 1966)
11. "Claudia" (recorded 1982)
12. "If You Believe In" (recorded 1982)
13. "Orange Skies" (recorded 1982)
14. "Alone Again Or" (recorded 1982)
15. "She Looks Good" (recorded 1966)
16. "Old Man" (recorded 1966)
