= She Comes in Colors =

- US issue

Single by Love

from the album Da Capo
- B-side: "Orange Skies"
- Released: December 1966
- Recorded: September 29, 1966
- Studio: RCA Victor (Hollywood, California)
- Genre: Psychedelic pop; folk rock; baroque pop
- Length: 2:49
- Label: Elektra
- Songwriter(s): Arthur Lee
- Producer(s): Paul A. Rothchild

Love singles chronology
"Stephanie Knows Who" (1966)	"She Comes in Colors" (1966)	"¡Que Vida!" (1967)

"She Comes in Colors" is a song written by Arthur Lee and released by the band Love as a single in 1966 and on their second album Da Capo. It was also included on a number of Love compilation albums, including Love Revisited and Best of Love and on the multi-artist compilation album Forever Changing: The Golden Age of Elektra 1963–1973.

Although modern critics have praised the song as being "sublime," or a "timeless jewel," or as possibly the best song Lee ever wrote, at the time of its release as a single it failed to make the Billboard Hot 100. Lee and some music critics believed that "She Comes in Colors" was a source for The Rolling Stones' song "She's a Rainbow", and several music critics and record company executives also believe that it influenced Madonna's "Beautiful Stranger", although Madonna has denied this. The song was also covered by several artists, including The Hooters.

== Writing and recording ==
Inspiration for "She Comes in Colors" came from the clothing worn by Love fan Annette Bonan (later Ferrell), who was also a friend of Arthur Lee. Love guitarist Johnny Echols recalls that the song "was about this girl named Annette who would come to all our shows wearing these outrageous gypsy clothes." The lyrics include a line about being in "England town," although Lee had never been to England when he wrote the song; Echols suggested that Lee change the line to "London town" but Lee refused. The guitar riff was influenced by folk rock. Instrumentation of Love's recording of the song includes harpsichord played by Alban "Snoopy" Pfisterer and flute played by Tjay Cantrelli.

Echols remembers "She Comes in Colors" to be the most difficult song on Da Capo to record, because it incorporated a lot of "strange chords." He said that the recording "probably took seven or eight takes, because in a way it's three songs in one, but it's hard to hear where the changes are." According to Echols: "The single version... and the album version were mixed differently. The flute and harpsichord were more prominent on the album because it was a stereo mix. The single was mono, so the vocal, as well as the guitars, were more forward, and the ancillary instruments were further back in the mix."

== Reception ==
The single release of "She Comes in Colors" received heavy airplay in several localities, including Los Angeles, but failed to chart on the Billboard Hot 100.

Cash Box said the single is a "bashing, discotheque-ish rock stand with lots of flutes and funk and stuff." AllMusic critic Richie Unterberger described "She Comes in Colors" as "enchanting," and "beautiful Baroque pop with dream-like images," suggesting that it might be the best song Lee ever wrote, and that it is Lee's "most melodic and graceful song." Gavin Edwards of Rolling Stone described the song as "wistful pop." Author Martin Charles Strong called it one of the "timeless jewels" on Da Capo. Paul Evans called the song "strange and lovely" in The New Rolling Stone Album Guide. Author Barney Hoskyns considers it one of Da Capo's "six sublime songs that blend psychedelia and punk rock with Latin and Broadway influences," and that it "employed Latin rhythms and cool jazz shadings to fashion a kind of spaced-out MOR." Author Bob Cianci praised Michael Stuart-Ware's drumming on the song.

After its original release as a single and on Da Capo, "She Comes in Colors" was also included on a number of Love compilation albums, including Love Revisited and Best of Love and on the multi-artist compilation album Forever Changing: The Golden Age of Elektra 1963–1973.

== Influence ==
A number of critics have suggested that "She Comes in Colors" was a source for The Rolling Stones 1967 song "She's a Rainbow," which incorporates the line "she comes in colors everywhere." Lee himself agreed that "She Comes in Colors" influenced "She's a Rainbow," believing that The Rolling Stones heard the song when Love played at the Whisky a Go Go. According to Da Capo engineer Bruce Botnick, Lee was bothered by the line he believed The Rolling Stones had stolen.

Others, such as USA Today's Ken Barnes, have suggested that the chorus, riff, instrumentation and structure of Madonna's song "Beautiful Stranger," from the soundtrack of Austin Powers: The Spy Who Shagged Me, were based on "She Comes in Colors." Rhino Records executive Gary Stewart has stated that "certainly, the riff and instrumentation [of Beautiful Stranger] are reminiscent of 'She Comes in Colors,'" and that the "da da da da da" chorus on "Beautiful Stranger" seems to be based upon "an instrumental flourish that's an integral part of the [Love] record. It may be a conscious or an unconscious homage." Madonna, however, has denied any such influence, claiming that she never heard of Love. Unbeknownst to her, William Orbit had brought the music of "Beautiful Stranger" to her after reworking "She Comes in Colors." The estate of Arthur Lee finally got its publishing share of Orbit's percentage in a settlement in 2017.

The Hooters covered "She Comes in Colors" on their 1985 album Nervous Night. The Age critic Paul Speelman noted that the keyboard playing on The Hooters' version of the song "will take many listeners back to the Doors." Ted Shaw of The Windsor Star claimed that it "could be a dark horse hit." Stereo Review called it "a surprisingly effective cover of an old Arthur Lee/ Love number." The Pale Fountains also covered the song.

Janet Jackson sampled "She Comes in Colors" in the track "Gon' Be Alright" on her album "Unbreakable."
