= Bryan MacLean =

American singer-songwriter (1946–1998)

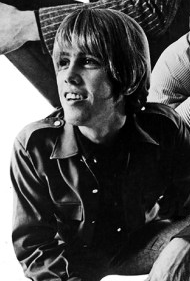
- MacLean, ca. 1967.

Background information
- Born: Bryan Andrew MacLean; September 25, 1946; Los Angeles, California, U.S.
- Died: December 25, 1998 (aged 52) Los Angeles, California, U.S.
- Genres: Psychedelic rock; folk rock; garage rock; baroque pop
- Occupations: Musician; songwriter; producer
- Instruments: Vocals, guitar
- Years active: 1963–1998
- Labels: Capitol; Elektra; Blue Thumb; A&M; RSO; Rhino; Sundazed
- Formerly of: Love
- Website: www.bryanmaclean.com

Bryan Andrew MacLean (September 25, 1946 — December 25, 1998) was an American singer, guitarist and songwriter, best known for his work with the influential rock band Love. His famous compositions for Love include "Alone Again Or", "Old Man" and "Orange Skies".

== Early life ==
Bryan MacLean's mother was an artist and a dancer, and his father was an architect for Hollywood celebrities such as Elizabeth Taylor and Dean Martin. Neighbor Frederick Loewe, of the songwriting team Lerner & Loewe, recognized him as a "melodic genius" at the age of three as he doodled on the piano. His early influences were Billie Holiday and George Gershwin, although he confessed to an obsession with Elvis Presley. During his childhood, he wore out show music records from Guys and Dolls, Oklahoma, South Pacific and West Side Story. His first girlfriend was Liza Minnelli, and they would sit at the piano together singing songs from The Wizard of Oz (1939). He learned to swim in Elizabeth Taylor's pool, and his father's good friend was actor Robert Stack. MacLean appears in the 1957 Cary Grant film An Affair to Remember, singing in the Deborah Kerr character's music class. Maria McKee is his half-sister.

MacLean's late teens co-incided with the fame of the Beatles, a band that had an immediate impact on him. In a radio interview from early 1998, MacLean said "When I saw A Hard Day's Night everything changed. I let my hair grow out and I got kicked out of high school."

== Music career ==
MacLean started playing guitar professionally in 1963, making appearances at a coffee house in West Hollywood called The Balladeer. His regular set routine was a mixture of Appalachian folk songs and Delta blues. He also frequently covered Robert Johnson's "Cross Road Blues". It was there he met Gene Clark and Roger McGuinn, the founding musicians of the Byrds, when they were rehearsing as a duo. MacLean also became good friends with David Crosby, along with songwriter Sharon Sheeley, who fixed him up on his first date with singer Jackie DeShannon.

MacLean's friendship with the Byrds led to him working for them as a roadie on an American tour, which included May 1965 shows with The Rolling Stones. He said later that "It was wonderful. I can't be calm about how great it was".

After an unsuccessful audition for a role in The Monkees, MacLean got into a car on the Sunset Strip that Arthur Lee was driving. Lee's band, the Grass Roots (not to be confused with the popular rock band of the same name), was the house band at a club called the Brave New World. Lee knew that the colorful dancers and scene that had followed the Byrds would follow MacLean if he joined Lee's band, so Lee had MacLean sit in with them there at the club.

=== The Grass Roots ===
The members of the Grass Roots were Lee (vocals, harmonica, guitar, keyboards, drums), Johnny Echols (lead guitar, vocals), Johnny Fleckenstein (bass), Don Conka (drums), and MacLean (rhythm guitar, vocals). Despite the success of Lee and the others at the Los Angeles club, another L.A. band led by P. F. Sloan was first to record under the name the Grass Roots, which spurred Lee to change the name of his band to Love.

=== Love ===
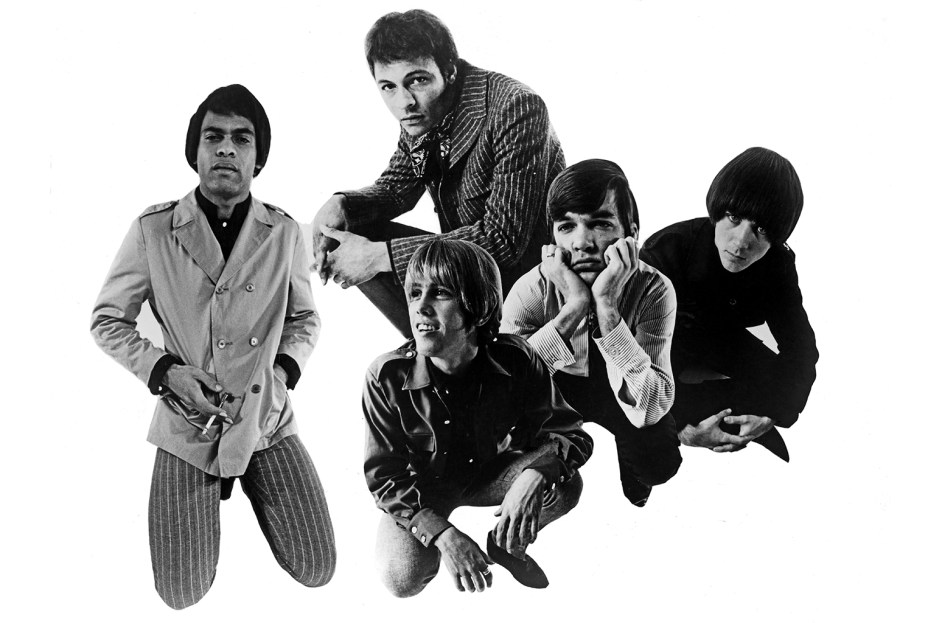
Love in 1967 (From left to right: Johnny Echols, Bryan MacLean, Arthur Lee [top], Ken Forssi, Michael Stuart).

Jac Holzman's Elektra Records signed Love, and they had a minor hit with their version of the Bacharach/David tune "My Little Red Book" from their March 1966 debut album, Love, to which MacLean contributed the song "Softly to Me", as well as co-writing two other songs. He also contributed to the Byrds' arrangement of "Hey Joe", which he performed live, singing the lead vocal on the record. Later that year, Love hit No. 33 on the US national chart with their proto-punk single "7 and 7 Is", followed by their second album in November, Da Capo, featuring MacLean's "Orange Skies".

Despite their early success, by mid-1967, Love's "classic" lineup was already falling apart, due to a combination of factors including internal tensions, complacency, lack of rehearsals, drug use, the growing creative rivalry between Lee and MacLean (MacLean was increasingly unhappy with Lee's domination of the songwriting), and Lee's refusal to tour or travel to promote their records. However, this lineup held together long enough to create their third album, Forever Changes (1967), which is considered one of the finest rock albums ever: it reached No. 40 on Rolling Stone magazine's list of the Top 500 Albums of All Time (2003); No. 6 on the NME's 100 Best Albums of All Time (2003) and No. 37 on their 500 Greatest Albums of All Time (2013); and No. 11 on Virgin's All-Time Top 1000 Albums (2000). It was entered into the National Recording Registry in May 2012.

Much of the credit for the completion of Forever Changes is due to co-producer Bruce Botnick. After early sessions stalled due to the group's lack of rehearsal and preparation, Botnick hired several members of the legendary L.A. session musician collective "the Wrecking Crew" to record with Lee and MacLean on two tracks, a tactic that effectively spurred the proper group back into action. After a brief period of intensive rehearsals, Love returned to the studio and completed the remaining cuts for the album in just 64 hours.

MacLean's "Alone Again Or" is the album's opening track, with MacLean and Lee providing co-lead vocals. "Alone Again Or" was the sole single released from the album to appear on the Billboard singles chart, backed with Lee's "A House Is Not a Motel". A remixed mono version of "Alone Again Or" was released as a promo single by Elektra in 1970. "Alone Again Or" initially peaked at No. 123 in 1968 in an edited version, while the longer, original album version spent three weeks on the singles chart in 1970 before peaking at No. 99, according to Joel Whitburn's Top Pop Singles: 1955-2010 (2011). In 2010, "Alone Again Or" came in at No. 442 in a poll of the 500 greatest songs of all time conducted by Rolling Stone magazine (it was No. 436 in the 2004 poll). It has been covered by many notable acts, including UFO, Calexico, the Damned, and a collaboration between Matthew Sweet and Susanna Hoffs.

=== Spiritual conversion and solo music career ===
MacLean was offered a solo contract with Elektra after the dissolution of Love, but his demo offerings were rejected by the label and the contract lapsed. Subsequently, he wrote a film score that was not used. In 1970, he tried to record an album for Capitol Records in New York, but began to drink so much that he was unable to complete the record. Whilst in New York, he had a religious experience while drinking in a bar. "At a bar on Third Avenue, I had a drink that turned to sawdust in my mouth, and something seemed to grip me by both elbows. I left the bar, and knew I'd been saved."

Bryan joined a Christian ministry called the Vineyard, the same church that took Bob Dylan. During Friday night Bible readings, MacLean took the concert part of the session and was so amazed at the money he received that he gradually assembled a catalogue of his Christian songs. His next move was to open a Christian nightclub in Beverly Hills called the Daisy. When it closed in 1977, MacLean considered going full-time into the ministry but decided once again to devote himself to music.

He played an unsuccessful reunion with Lee in 1978 on two dates but wasn't paid, so he turned down an offer for a UK tour, which was to have been billed as the "original" Love. The Bryan MacLean Band got a gig supporting Lee's Love at the Whisky in 1982. MacLean also worked with his half-sister Maria McKee and wrote the song "Don't Toss Us Away" for the debut album of her band Lone Justice.

Around 1996, MacLean's Elektra Records demo tapes were discovered by his mother Elizabeth in the family garage, and after two years of persistent shopping around to record companies, a deal was struck with Sundazed, who in 1997 released the CD Ifyoubelievein. In the album's liner notes, Rolling Stone's David Fricke wrote that the collection was, "in a sense, the Love record that never was: solo demos and home recordings of fourteen original MacLean songs, all written in the earliest and most vital years of Love and all but three virtually unheard in any form since MacLean wrote them".

MacLean added:

"The music that is presented in this collection was written decades ago, when I was in the band Love, and was written with that band in mind, and had been intended to be performed by, and associated with the band, Love. I firmly believe that if things had been the other way around, by now, you probably would've already heard a great deal, if not all of what is assembled here. For one thing, I would've stuck around the band a lot longer, not feeling the frustration of having such a backlog of unpublished, and unperformed material, and the natural unfulfilled desire for recognition, or even vindication."
—Liner notes of Ifyoubelievein, 1997

== Death ==
MacLean then completed a spiritual album of Christian music and was about to record another album when he died of a heart attack in a Los Angeles area restaurant on Christmas Day 1998.

== Discography ==
With Love

- 1966: Love
- 1966: Da Capo
- 1967: Forever Changes

Solo

- 1997: Ifyoubelievein
- 2000: Candy's Waltz
- 2005: Praise & Worship
- 2007: Intra Muros
- 2010: My New Song

With Maria McKee

- 2005: No One Was Kinder
