= ¡Que Vida! =

- US issue

Single by Love

from the album Da Capo
- B-side: "Hey Joe"
- Released: March 1967
- Recorded: September 29, 1966
- Studio: RCA Victor (Hollywood, California)
- Genre: Psychedelic rock; psychedelic pop
- Length: 3:37
- Label: Elektra
- Songwriter: Arthur Lee
- Producer: Paul A. Rothchild

Love singles chronology
"She Comes in Colors" (1966)	"¡Que Vida!" (1967)	"Alone Again Or" (1967)

"¡Que Vida!" is a song written by Arthur Lee and first released in 1967 by the band Love. It was released both on Love's album Da Capo and as a single, backed with "Hey Joe". It has also been included on several Love compilation albums.

== Composition ==
The song's title is Spanish for "What a Life", though the working title for the song was "With Pictures and Words". The lyrics, involving topics such as death and reincarnation, suggest to Hoskyns "bad-trip paranoia" and to Greenwald "a psychedelic state of mind". Music critic Richie Unterberger claims that in the song "Lee's Johnny Mathis inclinations start to flower in a series of question and answer lyrics." The melody is based on the 1965 song "Lifetime of Loneliness" by Burt Bacharach and Hal David. It employs a rhythm, described by author Bob Cianci as a "lilting Latin rhythm." It also incorporates sound effects such as sleigh bells, merry-go-round music and a popping champagne cork. Arthur Lee biographer John Einerson describes Lee's vocal tone on the song as "mellow". As described by author Barney Hoskyns, the song uses "Latin rhythms and cool jazz shadings to fashion a kind of spaced-out MOR."

== Reception ==
AllMusic critic Matthew Greenwald regard "¡Que Vida!" as a "true groundbreaking composition for Arthur Lee" in the way the allows the song to flow freely in the direction it wants to go. Greenwald also notes that although the chords always resolve, they go in surprising directions. Edna Gundersen and Ken Burns of USA Today described the song as "summery jazz-pop". Sean Elder of Salon calls the song "whimsical" and notes that it "almost seems like a parody of a hippie song, punctuated with what sounds like a pop gun."
