= My Little Red Book =

1965 song

Single by Manfred Mann

from the album My Little Red Book of Winners
- B-side: "What Am I Doing Wrong"
- Released: May 26, 1965
- Recorded: April 27, 1965
- Studio: EMI, London
- Genre: Jazz rock
- Length: 2:27
- Label: Ascot
- Composer: Burt Bacharach
- Lyricist: Hal David
- Producer: John Burgess

Manfred Mann US singles chronology
"Come Tomorrow" (1965)	"My Little Red Book" (1965)	"If You Gotta Go, Go Now" (1965)

Audio
- "My Little Red Book" on YouTube

"My Little Red Book" (occasionally subtitled "(All I Do Is Talk About You)") is a song composed by American songwriter Burt Bacharach with lyrics by Hal David. The duo was enlisted by Charles K. Feldman to compose the music to Woody Allen's film What's New Pussycat? following a chance meeting between Feldman and Bacharach's fiancée Angie Dickinson in London. "My Little Red Book" was composed in three weeks together with several other songs intended for the movie. Musically, the song was initially composed in the key of C major, largely based on a reiterating piano riff performed. David's lyrics tells the tale of a distraught lover, who after getting dumped by his girlfriend browses through his "little red book" and taking out several girls to dance in a vain effort to get over her.

The initial version of "My Little Red Book" was recorded by British pop group Manfred Mann because they were signed to United Artists Records in the United States. Recorded during a session at EMI Studios in London in April 1965, the session was attended by Bacharach, whose perfectionism the band found difficult to work with. Manfred Mann needed to perform several retakes of the song. Two renditions of the song were recorded, one for inclusion in What's New Pussycat and one specifically for single release. Issued through Ascot Records in the United States on May 26, 1965, "My Little Red Book" was released in place of Manfred Mann's contemporary UK single "Oh No Not My Baby". Despite receiving good critical reception, the Manfred Mann version stalled at number 124 on the Billboard Bubbling Under Hot 100 chart.

In 1966, "My Little Red Book" once again entered mainstream popularity after American rock band Love recorded it. Love's leader Arthur Lee and guitarist Johnny Echols saw What's New Pussycat? in the cinema, and being fans of Manfred Mann, they incorporated it into their setlist. The rendition varies from Manfred Mann's in tempo along with a more "tambourine-fueled rhythm". The chord progression was also changed, as Echols had forgotten several chords present in the original release. Recorded in January 1966 at Sunset Sound Recorders in Hollywood, California, together with producer Jac Holzman and Mark Abramson, the song was released as Love's debut single in March, 1966, through Elektra Records. The single reached number 52 on the Billboard Hot 100 and has been considered a "standard" and archetype of garage rock.

== Background and composition ==
By the mid-1960s, Burt Bacharach and Hal David were an established and respected songwriting duo, responsible for several hit singles with easy listening artists such as Dionne Warwick and Gene Pitney. In 1964, British television company Granada Television were interested in producing a television special about Bacharach titled The Bacharach Sound, after which he flew to London with his fiancée Angie Dickinson, an actress with filmmaking knowledge. At The Dorchester hotel, Dickinson met producer Charles K. Feldman, who was involved with Woody Allen in a new movie project, What's New Pussycat? (1965). Being shown a picture of Bacharach by Dickinson, Feldman became interested in working with him after hearing promising words about his songwriting, as Dickinson would state that "he [Bacharach] was a genius in my mind" even though she was unsure of whether he had scored film music before.

David and Bacharach were already composing music for a contemporary movie, Made in Paris (1966) and were afraid they wouldn't have time for both projects at once. The problem was solved when an agent hired by John Heyman said What's New Pussycat? was the better deal. Allegedly, Bacharach was unaware of that meeting until he only had three weeks left to compose music for the film. "My Little Red Book" was among the first songs they composed for the movie, being written before the movie's title track, composed during the Easter of 1965. Dickinson said that the first songs written for the project were "My Little Red Book", "Here I Am" and "some Russian thing". As usual, David wrote the lyrics for the song while Bacharach composed the music. The song lyrically refers to a man missing his previous girlfriend, though in a vain effort to get over her, "goes from A to Z in his red book", implied to be a telephone directory or an "affectionate journal detailing girls he admired." According to Manfred Mann vocalist Paul Jones, the lyrics were some of the most clever he sang:

"The lyric is so good. I got really excited about it because of that word, 'thumbed' in the second line. 'I got out my little red book the minute you said goodbye, I thumbed right through my little red book'. A lesser writer would've written 'I looked right through' or 'I went right through'. But 'thumbed'. I could actually see the slightly discolored corners of the paper where the thumb went. Hal [David] is just so precise and concrete."

— Paul Jones

By that time, Manfred Mann had become internationally successful, scoring a number-one hit in the US with their cover of "Do Wah Diddy Diddy" (1964). Despite having hits with rhythm and blues-oriented compositions, Manfred Mann's original musical style was largely rooted in jazz, which was useful when Bacharach used them as a basis for writing the song. They were chosen because they were signed to United Artists Records in the United States, which meant Bacharach could hire them extremely cheaply. He had no previous experience in working with a pop band and had opposed of rock and roll during the 1950s. To spite Manfred Mann, Bacharach composed "My Little Red Book" with several unorthodox modulations and chord progressions. Composed in the key of C major, it is built on a "repeating piano line" which only changes during the chorus while it also provides the song its backbeat.

== Recording ==
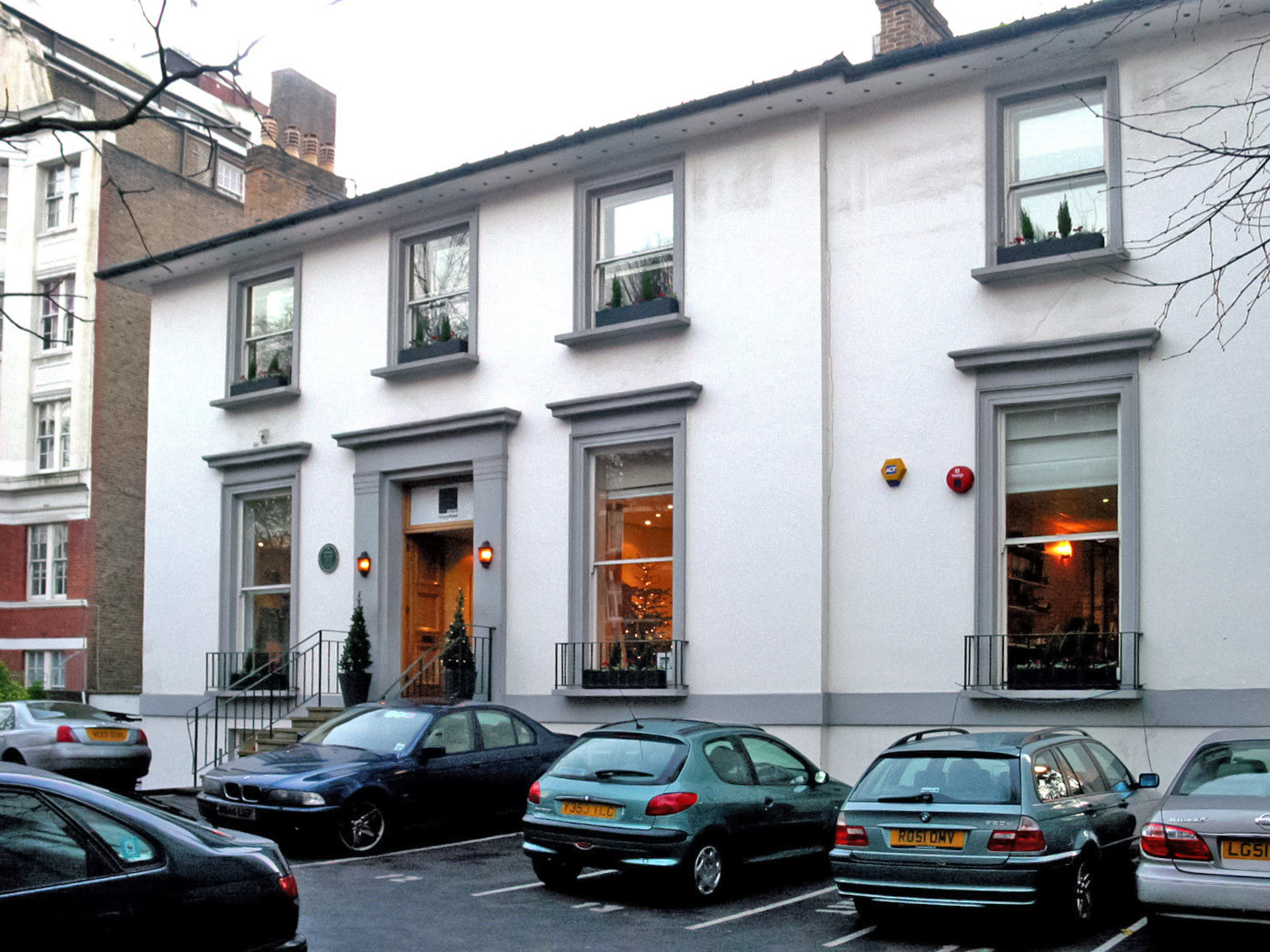
Manfred Mann recorded "My Little Red Book" at EMI Studios in London.

Manfred Mann were scheduled to appear at the EMI Studio in London by United Artists after being told that "Burt, Angie and Hal" would be present there. The recording session for "My Little Red Book" was booked amid sessions for their second album Mann Made (1965) so they were paid for by United Artists instead of Manfred Mann's British label His Master's Voice. The session, which was held on April 27, 1965, was towards the end of the three week deadline presented to Bacharach and David, which according to Serene Dominic led to the initial version recorded during that session being "lackluster" because of the rushed nature of it. She states it lacks anything characteristic of Manfred Mann besides "Paul Jones" edgy, rough vocals, which meant that the version was relatively simple in terms of overdubbing. The first version recorded by the group is the one which appeared in What's New Pussycat?. Jones disagreed, saying that the movie version was recorded after the single version of the song.

A second, more refined version of the song was recorded during the same session which according to drummer Mike Hugg was because the group saw problems with the "movie version" of the song, which in his words was because they were unable to capture an "American feel on the record. This second version of the song is thus much more refined, and features overdubbed organ, along with a flute passage by guitarist Mike Vickers, which mirrored the song's organ riff. Vickers additionally overdubbed saxophone on this version in order to give it more depth.

Due to Bacharach's perfectionism the band found working on the song extremely difficult. Allegedly, Jones had to re-record his vocal track about 19 times because of Bacharach being dissatisfied with several of them. Vickers also had trouble figuring out the chords for the song, while Bacharach found bass guitarist Tom McGuinness to be the only member that understood his songwriting. On the song's recording, Bacharach himself played piano. According to group keyboardist Manfred Mann, the piano chords of the songs were "too strident" which meant that Bacharach sat behind the piano and "pounded it and Mann to submission". In an interview with Greg Russo, Mann would elaborate that Bacharach wanted Mann to play the piano on beat "without accent" which he found too difficult; this resulted in Bacharach gradually forcing him off the piano until Bacharach stated "why don't I play it and you'll tell me if it sounds OK".

== Release and reception ==
In preparation for What's New Pussycat?, Ascot Records issued "My Little Red Book" as a single on May 26, 1965, in the United States. It was released in place of Manfred Mann's contemporary UK single, "Oh No Not My Baby", which saw only modest success, only reaching number 11 on the UK Singles Chart. The B-side of the single, "What Am I Doing Wrong", was taken from "Oh No, Not My Baby", although the US version was edited to be shorter. What's New Pussycat? debuted on June 22, 1965. "My Little Red Book" is featured in a scene set in a discotheque where actors "Peter O'Toole and Paula Prentiss shake things up". Bacharach was extremely disappointed with the movie because of the way it treated his name and his songs, focusing primarily on "My Little Red Book" as it was not a central part of the movie compared to the title track.

A great single, it reached far more ears on the [What's New Pussycat?] soundtrack album than it did as a stand-alone item

— Serene Dominic (2003)

"My Little Red Book" nonetheless became one of the worst performing singles during Manfred Mann's original tenure. In Billboard, the single only reached number 124 on the Bubbling Under Hot 100 chart. It fared similarly on the Cashbox Looking Ahead and Record World upcoming singles chart, reaching number 133 and 148 respectively. In Australia however, both the film and song were met with acclaim which led the single to reach number 26 on the Kent Music Report during the summer of 1965. The chart failure of the song led to His Master's Voice refusing to issue the single in the UK, where it would remain unreleased for several years afterwards. In the US, the single would be re-released on April 17, 1968, due to Manfred Mann's single "Mighty Quinn" (1968) reaching top ten; this reissue featured the suffix "(All I Do Is Talk About You)" though it failed to chart.

Reviews of the single primarily focused on the song's rhythm; In Billboard, the single is described as having been given a "hard-driving" Chicago dance, and as in a "powerpacked, pulsating blues-tinged style" by Cash Box, who chose the single as a pick of the week. The lyrical content was also noted, with Record World it is given a slightly satirical review in which the review panel believes "that they've found a likely candidate for sales" with the single in contrast to the moody subject matter of the song. Retrospectively, the jazz rock element has been noted, with Russo describes the song as "cool jazz rock" which never feels pretentious, and Matthew Greenwald of AllMusic, who describes it as one of Manfred Mann's "finer earlier tracks" and considers a prelude to the "swinging singles" which would become prevalent on the radio a few years later. The song was initially released on the soundtrack of What's New Pussycat, which was issued on May 25, 1965. It was included as the title track of Manfred Mann's third American album, My Little Red Book Of Winners! on September 13, 1965.

== Love version ==
"My Little Red Book"
- US issue

Single by Love

from the album Love
- B-side: "A Message to Pretty"
- Released: March 1966
- Recorded: January 25, 1966
- Studio: Sunset Sound Recorders, Hollywood, California
- Genre: Garage rock; proto-punk
- Length: 2:30
- Label: Elektra
- Composer: Burt Bacharach
- Lyricist: Hal David
- Producers: Jac Holzman; Mark Abramson

Love singles chronology
"My Little Red Book" (1966)	"7 and 7 Is" (1966)

Audio
- "My Little Red Book" on YouTube

=== Background ===
The American rock band Love formed in Los Angeles in February 1964, originally as the American Four before changing their name to the Grass Roots in April 1965. After seeing What's New Pussycat? in theater, bandleader Arthur Lee and lead guitarist Johnny Echols decided to add "My Little Red Book" to the band's setlist. During one of their performances at a local nightclub, Elektra Records president Jac Holzman saw the band, then named Love, and was impressed by their "manic intensity" on the song, feeling they had taken a "mediocre" song and given it "searing energy". He immediately offered them a recording contract, which they signed on January 4, 1966.

=== Recording and composition ===
Love recorded "My Little Red Book" for their self-titled debut album on January 25, 1966, the second of four days dedicated to the LP. The session was held at Sunset Sound Recorders with Holzman and Mark Abramson producing, and Bruce Botnick engineering. Taped on four-track recording equipment, the song's backing track was recorded live, with Lee then overdubbing his lead and harmony vocals. Biographer John Einarson highlights the recording practices used on the track as adding to its appeal, particularly the instruments being "mixed high and loud" which gave it "a dynamic presence and immediacy." Holzman credited this to Botnick's mixing; however, he also said that the "signature Elektra approach" involved very close microphone placement to make the instruments "sound bigger."

For Love's debut album, Botnick explained that they "basically played their [live] set", a point that rhythm guitarist Bryan MacLean echoed. Although Lee liked the arrangement of Manfred Mann's version, Love had increased the song's tempo and accentuated its beat, giving it "a stomping, tambourine-fueled rhythm" (Mason). The chord progression was also simplified into a garage rock guitar riff. Echols explained: "I forgot some of the chords after seeing the movie. When we went back and tried it at Arthur's house, I was missing certain parts, but that came to be the arrangement that we stuck with." Lee, who was a fan of Paul Jones, gave a "snarling" vocal performance which AllMusic's Stewart Mason says "seem[s] only barely to mask a suppressed fury". As well as garage rock, Love's version has been described as proto-punk and hard rock.

=== Release and reception ===
Love was released in March 1966, with "My Little Red Book" sequenced as the opening track. Holzman felt the song was "clearly the single" for the album, and Elektra issued it with the Lee original "A Message to Pretty" as the B-side. It reached number one on the LA charts and, in June, peaked at number 52 on the Billboard Hot 100 and number 35 on the Cash Box Top 100. It was the first hit record released by Elektra, and Holzman recalled pulling over to cry when he first heard it on his car radio.

Einarson writes that the song brought Love "instant acclaim" and broke them through to the wider music scene. In a contemporary review, Cash Box named the single their "Newcomer Pick" of the week, describing it as a "mighty impressive re-working" that features "an imaginative slow starting but effectively-building rhythmic style with a catchy, continuing throbbing beat." Guitarist Sterling Morrison named the song one of his favorites and said that his band the Velvet Underground would listen to it repeatedly and try "to unlock Love's sound". Early Pink Floyd manager Peter Jenner said that the song "Interstellar Overdrive" originated when he tried to hum the riff from Love's "My Little Red Book" to Syd Barrett. Biographer Ken Brooks feels the song's influence can also be heard in the music of Iron Butterfly. Bacharach himself wrote in his 2013 memoir: "although I didn't like their version because they were playing the wrong chords, it was nice to have a hit that gave me some credibility in the world of rock and roll."

Love's version of "My Little Red Book" has since been called a standard or "classic" of garage rock. In 1989, Dave Marsh ranked it number 868 on his list of the 1,001 greatest singles of all time.

== Chart performance ==
=== Manfred Mann version ===
Weekly chart performance for "My Little Red Book"
Chart (1965)	Peak position
Australia (Kent Music Report)	26
US Billboard Bubbling Under Hot 100 Singles	124
US Cashbox Looking Ahead	133
US Record World Upcoming Singles	148

=== Love version ===
Weekly chart performance for "My Little Red Book"
Chart (1966)	Peak position
Canada RPM 100	58
US Billboard Hot 100	52
US Cash Box Top 100	35
US Record World 100 Top Pops	43

== Sources ==
- Bacharach, Burt (2013). Anyone Who Had a Heart: My Life and Music. Atlantic Books. ISBN 978-0-857-89804-3.
- Bronson, Harold; Gallo, Phil; Sandoval, Andrew (1995). Love Story 1966-1972 (PDF) (Liner notes). Love. Rhino Records. R2 73500.
- Brooks, Ken (1997). Arthur Lee: Love Story. Andover, Hampshire: Agenda Books. ISBN 1-899882-60-X.
- Chapman, Rob (2010). A Very Irregular Head: The Life of Syd Barrett. Cambridge, MA: Da Capo Press. ISBN 978-0-306-81914-8.
- Dominic, Serene (2003). Burt Bacharach: Song By Song. Schirmer Trade Books. ISBN 0-857-12259-2.
- David, Eunice (2016). Hal David: His Magic Moments: There is Always Something There to Remind Me. Dorrance Publishing Company. ISBN 9-781-48093-100-8.
- Einarson, John (2010). Forever Changes: Arthur Lee and the Book of Love. London: Jawbone Press. ISBN 978-1-906002-31-2.
- Hall, Chris; Kerry, Mike (2008). Love Story (DVD). Start Productions.
- Hoskyns, Barney (2002). Arthur Lee: Alone Again Or. Edinburgh: Mojo Books. ISBN 978-1-84195-315-1.
- Houghton, Mick (2010). Becoming Elektra: The True Story of Jac Holzman's Visionary Record Label. London: Jawbone Press. ISBN 978-1-906002-29-9.
- Kent, David (2005). Australian Chart Book 1940–1969. Australian Chart Book Pty Ltd, Turramurra, N.S.W. ISBN 0-646-44439-5.
- Kopp, Bill (2018). Reinventing Pink Floyd: From Syd Barrett to the Dark Side of the Moon. Lanham, MD: Rowman & Littlefield. ISBN 9781538108284.
- Marsh, Dave (1989). The Heart of Rock & Soul. New York, NY: Plume. ISBN 978-0-452-26305-5.
- Platts, Robin (2003). Burt Bacharach & Hal David: What The World Needs Now. Burlington, Ontario: Collector's Guide Publishing. ISBN 978-1-896522-77-7.
- Russo, Greg (2011). Mannerisms: The Five Phases Of Manfred Mann (2nd ed.). Crossfire Publications. ISBN 978-0-9648157-1-1.
