= 7 and 7 Is =

Single by Love

from the album Da Capo
- B-side: "No. Fourteen"
- Released: July 1966
- Recorded: June 17 and 20, 1966
- Studio: Sunset Sound Recorders, Hollywood, California
- Genre: Garage rock; proto-punk; folk rock
- Length: 2:14 (stereo); 2:23 (mono)
- Label: Elektra
- Songwriter: Arthur Lee
- Producer: Jac Holzman

Love singles chronology
"My Little Red Book" (1966)	"7 and 7 Is" (1966)	"Stephanie Knows Who" (1966)

"7 and 7 Is" is a song by the American rock band Love. Written by Arthur Lee, it was released as a single in July 1966 and later appeared on the studio album Da Capo. The single peaked at number 33 on the Billboard Hot 100 and was the highest-charting single of the band's career.

Lee's lyrics describe angst while growing up. It was originally a slower, folkier song, but developed into a garage rock and proto-punk song as the band experimented with it in the studio. The song's recording sessions were tumultuous as the difficult drum part led to many takes being done.

== Background and development ==
Arthur Lee wrote "7 and 7 Is" at the Colonial Apartments on Sunset Boulevard in West Hollywood. The song was inspired by his high school girlfriend Anita "Pretty" Billings, with whom he shared a birthday of March 7. (Note: Billings had also inspired Lee's songs "My Diary" (recorded by Rosa Lee Brooks) and "A Message to Pretty" from Love's self-titled debut album.) Describing how the song came to him, Lee stated: "I was living on Sunset and woke up early one morning. The whole band was asleep. I went in the bathroom, and I wrote those words. My songs used to come to me just before dawn, I would hear them in dreams, but if I didn't get up and write them down, or if I didn't have a tape recorder to hum into, I was through. If I took for granted that I could remember it the next day—boink, it was gone." The lyrics describe Lee's frustration at teenage life—the reference to "in my lonely room I'd sit, my mind in an ice cream cone" being to wearing (in reality or metaphorically) a dunce's cap.

Lee's original version of the song was a slow folk song in the style of Bob Dylan. Its arrangement developed as the band experimented in the studio. Bassist Ken Forssi had received a bass fuzz effect unit from an endorsement deal the band had signed with Vox, and Lee suggested Forssi use it on "7 and 7 Is". Lead guitarist Johnny Echols recalled: "We started playing [with it] and at first it sounded strange, but Kenny started doing this sliding bass thing with it. As we played it we could hear that this was something different, something new."

== Recording ==
Love recorded "7 and 7 Is" on June 17 and 20, 1966, at Sunset Sound Recorders, with Jac Holzman producing and Bruce Botnick engineering. The fuzz bass was ultimately abandoned as it overpowered the other instruments, but Forssi was able to achieve a similar sound with the feedback caused by his semi-acoustic Eko bass. Echols also used feedback, as well as extensive reverb and tremolo, saying he had wanted to use a surf guitar effect in a different context.

The sessions were tumultuous due to the song's fast and intense drum part, with Lee and drummer Alban "Snoopy" Pfisterer taking turns trying to accomplish it. Pfisterer later said: "The session was a nightmare ... I had blisters on my fingers. I don't know how many times I tried to play that damn thing and it just wasn't coming out. Arthur would try it; then I'd try it. Finally I got it. He couldn't do it." Echols praised it as Pfisterer's best performance. Estimates in the number of takes the song required range from 20 to 60; however, most of these were only false starts. The song took 4 hours to record according to Echols, who also claimed that the session took longer due to Holzman and Botnick objecting to the band's experimentation: "they kept stopping us, saying, 'It's feeding back!' We'd say, 'It's supposed to feed back.'"

In what has been called a "flirtation" with musique concrète, the track climaxes with a sound effect of an explosion from a nuclear weapon. Botnick claimed that it was his idea to add the sound effect, saying that it was taken from a sound effects record and may have been the sound of a gunshot slowed down. (Note: Botnick was quoted as saying this in John Einarson's 2010 book Forever Changes: Arthur Lee and the Book of Love. Prior to its publication, Gallo (1995) and Brooks (1997) had said that the sound effect originated from test sites in Nevada.) During live performances, Echols would recreate the sound by kicking his amplifier with the reverb turned all the way up. The track then ends with a coda that Echols claims to have written, inspired by the 1959 song "Sleep Walk" by Santo & Johnny. Echols also claims that he was supposed to receive a songwriting credit for the coda, but never did.

In contrast to the chaotic energy of "7 and 7 Is" and its recording, the band also recorded a largely acoustic-based demo of another song during this time. Under the working title "Hummingbirds", it was originally intended to be the B-side of "7 and 7 Is", but was instead shelved. The band re-recorded it the following year and it appeared on their album Forever Changes as "The Good Humor Man He Sees Everything Like This". The original demo was released on the 50th anniversary edition of that album in 2018.

== Composition ==
According to musicologist Michael Hicks, the "main body" of "7 and 7 Is" alternates between the keys of A major and A minor and has a "fast" tempo of roughly 155 beats per minute. The coda is in the key of C major, is in compound meter, and is roughly 52 beats per minute. The song has been described as garage rock, proto-punk and folk rock.

== Release and reception ==
Elektra Records issued "7 and 7 Is" in July 1966, backed with "No. Fourteen", an outtake from Love's debut album. It entered the Billboard Hot 100 on July 30 and spent 10 weeks on the chart, peaking at number 33 on September 24. It was the highest-charting single of the band's career. Elektra released the band's second album, Da Capo, in November, with "7 and 7 Is" sequenced as the fourth track, between "¡Que Vida!" and "The Castle".

Music critic Robert Christgau called the song "a perfect rocker". Cash Box described the song as a "pulsating, rhythmic extremely danceable blueser with a clever gimmick wind-up".

== Personnel ==
- Arthur Lee — vocals, guitar effects
- Johnny Echoes - lead guitar
- Bryan MacLean - rhythm guitar
- Alban "Snoopy" Pfisterer - drums
- Ken Forssi - bass guitar

== Covers ==
The song was later covered by numerous bands, most notably Ramones, Alice Cooper, Jared Louche and The Aliens, The Electric Prunes, Billy Bragg, The Sidewinders, The Fuzztones, Robert Plant, Rush, Alice Bag, The Weirdos, The Bangles, Deep Purple, and Hollywood Vampires as well as a re-recording by Lee himself.
