= Hey Joe =

1962 song written and composed by Billy Roberts

- The Leaves' third release of "Hey Joe"

Single by the Leaves
- B-side: "Be with You" (1st pressing); "Girl from the East" (2nd pressing); "Funny Little World" (3rd pressing)
- Released: November 25, 1965
- Recorded: Late 1965
- Genre: Hard rock, proto-punk
- Length: 2:40
- Label: Mira
- Songwriters: Public Domain (1st pressing); Dino Valenti a.k.a. Chet Powers (2nd & 3rd pressings); Billy Roberts (copyrighted)
- Producer: Norm Ratner

The Leaves singles chronology
"Love Minus Zero" (1965)	"Hey Joe" (1965)	"You Better Move On" (1965)

"Hey Joe" is a song from the 1960s that has become a rock standard and been performed in many musical styles by hundreds of different artists. The lyrics are a back and forth conversation between "Joe", a man on the run and planning to escape to Mexico after shooting his unfaithful wife, and an apparent friend who is questioning him.

In 1962, Billy Roberts registered "Hey Joe" for copyright in the United States. In late 1965, Los Angeles–based garage band The Leaves recorded the earliest known commercial version of "Hey Joe", which was released as a single and titled "Hey Joe, Where You Gonna Go". They re-recorded the song and released it in 1966 as a single, which became a hit in the US, reaching #31 on the Billboard Hot 100 chart. In October 1966, Jimi Hendrix recorded "Hey Joe" for his first single with the Jimi Hendrix Experience.

== Authorship ==
The authorship of the song has been contested, and different recordings have credited its writing to either Billy Roberts or Dino Valenti, or have listed it as a traditional song. "Hey Joe" was registered for copyright in the US in 1962 by Billy Roberts, a California-based folk musician. Scottish folk singer Len Partridge has claimed that he helped write the song with Roberts when they both performed in clubs in Edinburgh in 1956. Roberts may have drawn inspiration for "Hey Joe" from three earlier works: the song "Baby, Please Don’t Go to Town" written by his girlfriend Niela Horn (later Miller), which uses a similar chord progression based on the circle of fifths; Carl Smith's 1953 US country hit "Hey Joe!" (written by Boudleaux Bryant), which shared the title and the "questioning" format; and the early 20th century traditional ballad "Little Sadie", which tells of a man on the run after he has shot his wife. Niela Horn Miller's song "Baby Don't Go to Town" was recorded as a demo tape in 1962, but was not released until 2009 when it appeared on her album Songs of Leaving.

Billy Roberts performed "Hey Joe" regularly in the late 1950s and early 1960s, without copyrighting it, and some other performers including Pete Seeger recognised that it had been developed from Niela Miller's song. In 1962, Roberts registered the song as his composition at the Library of Congress, and recorded a demo tape of it. Niela Miller separately registered some of her songs, including "Baby, Please Don't Go to Town". Seeger offered to testify on her behalf so she could claim part of the credit for "Hey Joe", but this was not pursued. Roberts also played the song when touring with his friend Dino Valenti. When Valenti moved to California in 1963, he began performing it himself, and copyrighted it in Los Angeles as his own composition.

Roberts later regained the composing credit, but a share of the publishing income was retained by the Los Angeles publishing company. Other sources (including singer Pat Craig) claim that Roberts assigned the rights to the song to his friend Valenti while Valenti was in jail, in order to give him some income upon release. Rights to the song were administered from 1966 into the 2000s by the music publisher Third Story Music (now Third Palm Music); there, the author is listed as Billy Roberts.

Singer Tim Rose recorded the song in 1966, and copyrighted it as his own arrangement of a traditional song. No documentary evidence has been forthcoming to support an assertion that "Hey Joe" is a wholly traditional work. In 1998, Rose told writer Spencer Leigh that he had learned the song in 1960 from folk singer Vince Martin.

== Lyrics ==
The lyrics to "Little Sadie" often locate the events in Thomasville, North Carolina, and "down in" Jericho, South Carolina (a large rice plantation in the lowlands); Roberts was born in South Carolina. Variations of "Little Sadie" have been recorded under various titles (including "Bad Lee Brown", "Penitentiary Blues", "Cocaine Blues", "Whiskey Blues") by many artists, including Clarence Ashley (1930).

The lyrics are written in two stanzas with a short repeated refrain. The first stanza has a bystander locate Joe walking with a gun in his hand and asks about his intentions. Joe answers with the main refrain that his woman did him wrong and he wishes to shoot her. In the second stanza, Joe is preparing to go on the run to Mexico in order to evade capture and avoid the police. The lyrics have been interpreted in two different casts of opinion with the first cast claiming that the lyrics point to the flight of Joe to Mexico as his quest for freedom from oppression in avoiding the law. The other approach to the lyrics has been to read the "woman-done-me-wrong" song as "ugly and misogynist, with Joe's air of unapologetic defiance" being unjustifiable according to writer David Stubbs.

== Early recordings (1965–1966) ==
"Hey Joe (You Just Shot Your Woman Down)"

Single by Tim Rose

from the album Tim Rose
- B-side: "I'm Bringin' It Home"
- Released: May 1966
- Recorded: Early 1966
- Genre: Folk rock
- Length: 4:53 (album version); 2:55 (single version)
- Label: Columbia
- Songwriter: Billy Roberts
- Producer: David Rubinson

Tim Rose singles chronology
"King Lonely The Blue" (1966)	"Hey Joe (You Just Shot Your Woman Down)" (1966)	"I Got A Loneliness" (1966)

Roberts' song gained fans in the Los Angeles music scene of the mid-1960s, which led to fast-paced recordings in 1965 and 1966 by the Leaves, the Standells, the Surfaris, Love, the Music Machine, and the Byrds, swiftly making the song a garage rock classic. Both Valenti and the Byrds' David Crosby have been reported as helping to popularize the song before it was recorded by the Leaves in December 1965.

"It was there where Pat Boone discovered us, signed us, and got us our first record contract. We recorded a song everyone in Hollywood was doing in those days called Hey Joe." - Jim Pons

The Leaves, who had been introduced to the song while attending performances by the Byrds (who had yet to record their own version of the song) at Ciro's in Los Angeles, recorded and released three versions of "Hey Joe" between 1965 and 1966. Their first version was released in November/December 1965, but sold poorly. The band's third recorded version of the song became a hit in May/June 1966, reaching No. 31 on the Billboard Hot 100 chart and No. 29 on the Canadian RPM Magazine charts. The Leaves' version is the only recording of the song to reach the Top 40 of the Billboard chart.

The Surfaris’ recording of the song, released on the B-side of its "So Get Out" single, is sometimes cited as being the first rock recording of the song, but a number of reliable sources contend that the Surfaris' version dates from 1966, well after the Leaves' original 1965 version. There is some dispute over exactly when the Surfaris' recording of the song was released. Some sources list its release date as being late 1965 and other sources list it as being June 1966; the catalog number sequencing for Decca Records places the release in April 1966.

Three other Los Angeles bands recorded the song in 1966: the Standells with the title "Hey Joe, Where You Gonna Go", included it on their 1966 Dirty Water album; the Music Machine recorded a slow, moody, fuzz-laden version of the song (that bandleader Sean Bonniwell later said had been worked out by himself and Tim Rose) in late 1966; and Love included a version on their debut album, Love, recorded in January 1966 and released on Elektra Records in April. Love's Bryan MacLean was introduced to the song by David Crosby during 1965, while MacLean had been a roadie for the Byrds. Love's lead vocalist, Arthur Lee, claimed in later years that it was Love's version that turned Jimi Hendrix on to the song as well as most of the other Los Angeles acts who covered the song. Love's recording of "Hey Joe" features slightly different lyrics than most versions of the song; for example, the lyric "gun in your hand" became "money in your hand" in Love's version. The Byrds recording of the song also features the same altered lyrics as Love's version. Love guitarist Johnny Echols claims that Love's and the Byrds' lyrics are the authentic ones. According to Echols, the Leaves (with whom they were friends) had heard Love performing the song and asked them for the lyrics. He rewrote them to play the Leaves a "dirty trick", accidentally authoring the version that everybody got to know.

The Chicago-based Shadows of Knight included a rave-up version of "Hey Joe" on their second LP, Back Door Men, in 1966.

== The Byrds version ==
"Hey Joe (Where You Gonna Go)"

Song by the Byrds

from the album Fifth Dimension
- Released: July 18, 1966
- Recorded: April 28, 1966
- Studio: Columbia, Hollywood
- Genre: Rock
- Length: 2:17
- Label: Columbia
- Songwriter: Billy Roberts
- Producer: Allen Stanton

The Byrds included a recording of the song, titled "Hey Joe (Where You Gonna Go)", on their 1966 album, Fifth Dimension. The lead vocalist on the Byrds' version was David Crosby, who was instrumental in bringing the song to the group and in popularizing the song within the larger L.A. music community. Crosby had wanted to record the song almost since the band first formed in 1964, but the other members of the Byrds had been unenthusiastic about the song. By the time of the recording sessions for Fifth Dimension, several other bands had enjoyed success with covers of "Hey Joe", leaving Crosby angered by his bandmates' lack of faith in the song. Byrds' guitarist and band leader Roger McGuinn recalled in an interview that "The reason Crosby did lead (vocal) on 'Hey Joe' was because it was his song. He didn't write it but he was responsible for finding it. He'd wanted to do it for years but we would never let him. Then both Love and the Leaves had a minor hit with it and David got so angry that we had to let him do it."

General consensus within the band and among critics was that the Byrds' version wasn't an entirely successful reading of the song and was inferior to previous recordings of the song by Love and the Leaves. In later years, both McGuinn and the band's manager, Jim Dickson, criticized Crosby's vocal performance on the song for not being powerful enough to carry the aggressive subject matter and expressed regret that the song had been included on Fifth Dimension. Crosby himself later admitted that the recording of the song was an error on his part, stating "It was a mistake, I shouldn't have done it. Everybody makes mistakes."

The song went on to become a staple of the Byrds' live concert repertoire during 1966 and 1967. The band also included the song in their performance at the Monterey Pop Festival, which is included on the 2002 The Complete Monterey Pop Festival DVD box set as well as on the 1992 The Monterey International Pop Festival CD box set.

== Jimi Hendrix Experience version ==
"Hey Joe"
- US picture sleeve

Single by the Jimi Hendrix Experience

from the album Are You Experienced (North American releases only)
- B-side: "Stone Free" (UK); "51st Anniversary" (US)
- Released: December 16, 1966
- Recorded: October 23, 1966
- Studio: De Lane Lea, London
- Genre: Blues rock
- Length: 3:30
- Label: Polydor
- Songwriter: Billy Roberts
- Producer: Chas Chandler

The Jimi Hendrix Experience singles chronology
"Hey Joe" (1966)	"Purple Haze" (1967)

When Jimi Hendrix was exploring a more rock-oriented sound in New York City in 1966 with his group Jimmy James and the Blue Flames, "Hey Joe" was one of the first songs he performed regularly. His arrangement used a slower tempo reminiscent of Tim Rose's recent single version, which he had heard on a jukebox. Looking for musical acts to produce, Chas Chandler, the ex-bassist for the Animals, checked out Hendrix. By chance, the first song Hendrix performed during Chandler's visit was "Hey Joe", a song Chandler was interested in promoting. As a result, Chandler decided to take Hendrix with him to England in September 1966, where he would subsequently turn the guitarist into a star.

Released in December 1966, Hendrix's version became a hit in the United Kingdom, entering the Top 10 of the UK Singles Chart in January 1967 and peaking at No. 6. The single was released in the United States on May 1, 1967, with the B-side "51st Anniversary", but failed to chart. Nevertheless, it was listed at No. 201 on Rolling Stone magazine's The 500 Greatest Songs of All Time in 2010. In 2000, Total Guitar magazine ranked it as the 13th greatest cover version of all time. In 2009, it was named the 22nd greatest hard rock song of all time by VH1. Far Out and American Songwriter both named it Hendrix's third-greatest song. In 2019, the British Phonographic Industry awarded "Hey Joe" its Silver certification, signifying sales of over 200,000. However, it is unknown whether this applies to the original recording or a subsequent live version.

"Hey Joe" was the last song Hendrix performed at the Woodstock festival in 1969 and as such, it was also the final song of the whole festival. The song was performed after the crowd, comprising the 80,000 who had not yet left the festival, cheered for an encore.

== Later recordings / live performances (1967–present) ==
"Hey Joe"

Single by Johnny Hallyday
- Language: French
- B-side: "La petite fille de l'hiver"
- Released: March 15, 1967
- Recorded: October–November 1966
- Studio: Olympic Studios, London
- Genre: Pop rock
- Length: 3:05
- Label: Philips
- Songwriters: Billy Roberts, Gilles Thibaut
- Producer: Lee Hallyday

Johnny Hallyday singles chronology
"Si j'étais un charpentier" (1966)	"Hey Joe" (1967)	"Amour d'été" (1967)

"Hey Joe"

Single by Cher

from the album With Love, Chér
- B-side: "Our Day Will Come"
- Released: July 31, 1967
- Recorded: Late 1966
- Genre: Pop
- Length: 2:49
- Label: Liberty
- Songwriter: Billy Roberts
- Producer: Sonny Bono

Cher singles chronology
"Mama (When My Dollies Have Babies)" (1966)	"Hey Joe" (1967)	"You Better Sit Down Kids" (1967)

"Hey Joe"

Single by Wilson Pickett

from the album Right On
- B-side: "Night Owl"
- Released: June 28, 1969
- Recorded: Early–mid 1969
- Studio: FAME Studios, Muscle Shoals, Alabama, US
- Genre: R&B, soul
- Length: 3:05
- Label: Atlantic
- Songwriter: Billy Roberts
- Producer: Rick Hall

Wilson Pickett singles chronology
"Born to Be Wild" (1969)	"Hey Joe" (1969)	"You Keep Me Hangin' On" (1969)

Cher recorded a version of "Hey Joe" on Imperial Records in late 1966, which peaked at number 94 on the Billboard Hot 100 chart. It was included on her 1967 album, With Love, Chér. An AllMusic review noted that her version "makes for some fun" but was "not so spectacular" and "clearly the wrong material for this great singer." Cash Box praised the "outstanding vocal showing from Cher (as usual)" and said the track "combine[s] considerable impact for a pop market barnstorming", also noting the "most appealing delivery of a lyric in a long while" and a "smashing blues-rock side". French singer Johnny Hallyday covered the song in French in 1967. His version reached No. 2 in Wallonia (French-speaking Belgium).

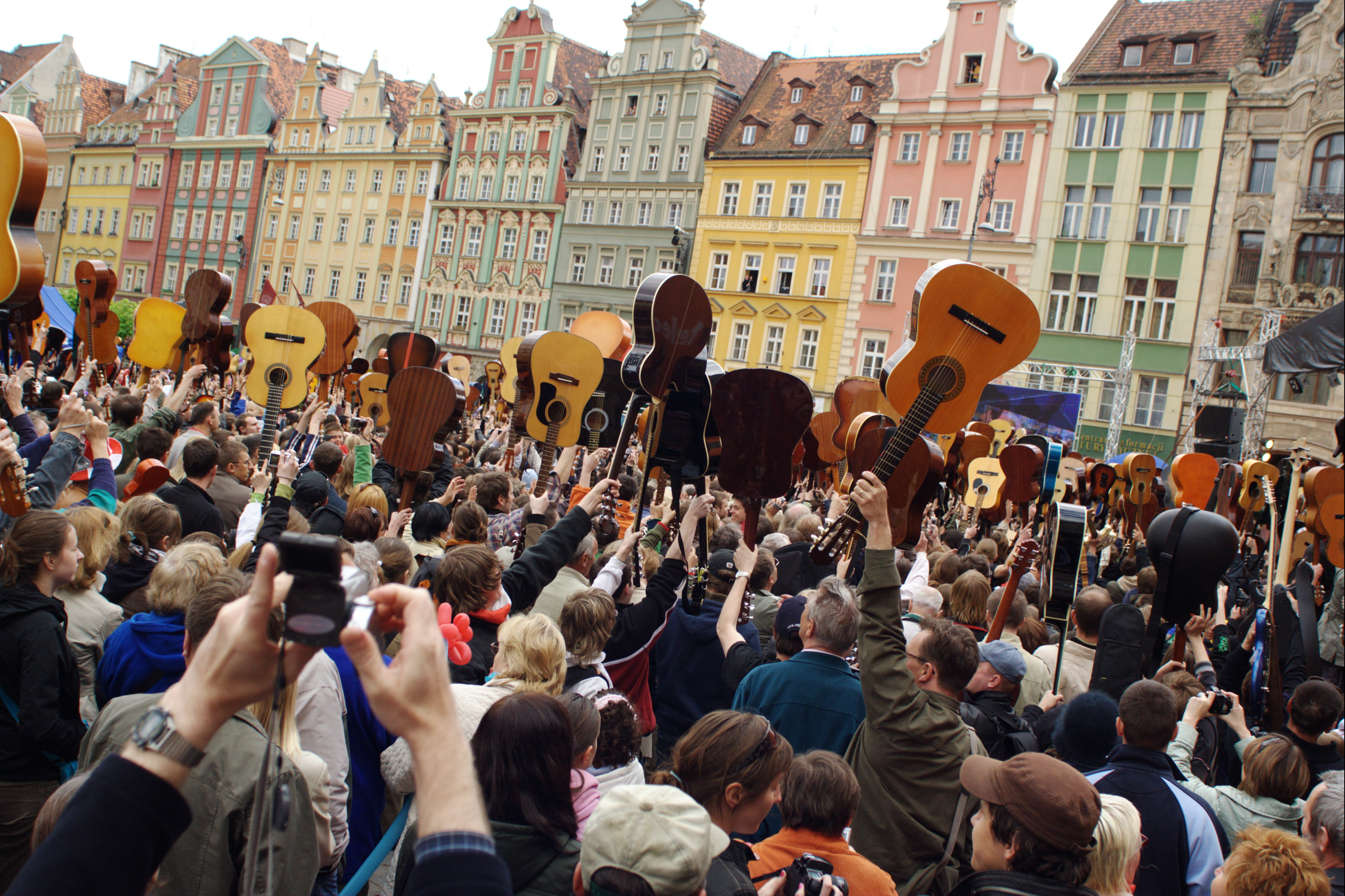
1,881 guitarists played "Hey Joe" in Wrocław on May 1, 2007, setting what was, at the time, a new Guinness record for number of simultaneous guitarists.

Marmalade recorded a version of the song in 1968 because they needed a B-side to their single "Lovin' Things" in a hurry, and because they thought it was a traditional song and as such, the band would get the songwriting royalties from it. Marmalade guitarist Junior Campbell stated in interview that "Jimi Hendrix's version had already sold about 200,000 copies and then we sold about 300,000 on the flip of 'Lovin' Thing'. But then the following year, the bloke who'd written the bloody song suddenly turned up out of the woodwork!". Frank Zappa recorded a parody of the song, titled "Flower Punk", on the Mothers of Invention album We're Only in It for the Money in 1968. The song was one of several on the album that parodied the fashionable hippie lifestyle. Lyrics in Zappa's version included "Hey punk, where you goin' with that flower in your hand?/Well, I'm goin' up to Frisco to join a psychedelic band."

It was recorded at a slower tempo and included as track 8 on the album Shades of Deep Purple (1968) by Deep Purple.

Wilson Pickett released a version of the song that reached No. 59 on the US Hot 100 in August 1969, No. 29 on the US R&B chart, and No. 42 on the Canadian RPM magazine chart. Patti Smith released a cover of "Hey Joe" as the A-side of her first single, backed with "Piss Factory", in 1974. Her version is unique in that she includes a brief and salacious monologue about fugitive heiress Patty Hearst and her kidnapping and participation with the Symbionese Liberation Army. Smith's version portrays Hearst as Joe with a "gun in her hand".

In 1983, English synth-pop duo Soft Cell released "Hendrix Medley", combining "Hey Joe", "Purple Haze" and "Voodoo Chile", as a 12-inch EP bundled with initial copies of their second studio LP, The Art of Falling Apart.

In 1992, gothic metal/doom metal band Type O Negative released a version (entitled "Hey Pete", after the band's vocalist's name) on their pseudo-live album The Origin of the Feces. The Make-Up recorded a version for their 1999 album Save Yourself.

In 1996, Brazilian alternative rock band O Rappa released a Portuguese version of the song on their second album Rappa Mundi, featuring rapper Marcelo D2 from Brazilian rap band Planet Hemp.

Former Led Zeppelin singer Robert Plant recorded a longer and brooding version for his 2002 album Dreamland.

A version of the song was recorded by Charlotte Gainsbourg for the soundtrack of the 2013 art film Nymphomaniac.

In Wrocław, Poland, several records were set for mass performances of "Hey Joe". The latest was on May 1, 2023, when 7,967 guitarists played the song outdoors.

== Charts ==
=== The Leaves recording ===
1966 weekly chart performance for "Hey Joe" by The Leaves
Chart (1966)	Peak position
Canada Top Singles (RPM)	29
US Billboard Hot 100	31

=== Jimi Hendrix recording ===
1967 weekly chart performance for "Hey Joe" by Jimi Hendrix
Chart (1967)	Peak position
Australia (Go-Set National Top 40)	40
Belgium (Ultratop 50 Wallonia)	2
Netherlands (Dutch Top 40)	11
Netherlands (Single Tip)	8
Norway (VG-lista)	10
UK Singles (Official Charts)	6
West Germany (GfK)	21

2013 weekly chart performance for "Hey Joe"
Chart (2013)	Peak position
France (SNEP)	155

=== Cher recording ===
1967 weekly chart performance for "Hey Joe" by Cher
Chart (1967)	Peak position
US Billboard Hot 100	94

== Certifications ==
Certifications for "Hey Joe"
Region	Certification	Certified units/sales
Italy (FIMI)	Gold	50,000^{‡}
New Zealand (RMNZ)	Platinum	30,000^{‡}
United Kingdom (BPI)	Gold	400,000^{‡}
^{‡} Sales+streaming figures based on certification alone.

== Sources ==
- Sixties Rock, Michael Hicks, University of Illinois Press, 2000
- Original Seeds Vol. 2: Songs that inspired Nick Cave & the Bad Seeds, Kim Beissel, CD liner notes, Rubber Records Australia, 2004
