= Out Here (Love album) =

Studio album by Love
- Released: December 1969
- Recorded: September–October 1968
- Studio: A makeshift studio in a rented warehouse, Hollywood
- Genre: Psychedelic rock, blues rock, acid rock
- Length: 69:23
- Label: Blue Thumb (U.S.); Harvest (UK)
- Producer: Arthur Lee

Love chronology
Four Sail (1969)	Out Here (1969)	False Start (1970)

Alternative cover
- Out Here (1990 CD cover)

Professional ratings
Review scores
Source	Rating
AllMusic	3.5/5 stars
The Encyclopedia of Popular Music	2/5 stars
The Village Voice	C−

Out Here is the fifth album by the American rock band Love, released in December 1969 by Blue Thumb Records in the United States and Harvest in the United Kingdom. The album charted in the UK, reaching No. 29 in May 1970.

== Background ==
After the dissolution of the original Love lineup following the release of Forever Changes (1967), Arthur Lee assembled a new band, including guitarist Jay Donnellan, drummer George Suranovich and bassist Frank Fayad. The quartet recorded 27 songs, ten of which were released by Elektra Records as Four Sail in August 1969, with the remaining songs being issued by Blue Thumb Records as a double LP, Out Here, that December. The title came from the name of the cover painting, created by Burt Shonberg.

In 1982, eight songs from Out Here were used to fill out the first side of an album titled Studio/Live, released by MCA Records. Three of the songs were edited specifically for this release: "Doggone" (from 12:00 to 3:15); "Love Is More Than Words or Better Late Than Never" (from 11:20 to 2:30); and "Gather Round" (from 5:50 to 3:30). Studio/Live was issued on CD by One Way Records in 1991. The live side was recorded at Bill Graham's Fillmore East.

In 1988, the British label Big Beat Records put together an official compilation called Out There, featuring most of the songs from Out Here and three songs from the band's follow-up album, 1970's False Start. In 1990, Out Here was released on compact disc by MCA Records. In May 2007, the album was included in The Blue Thumb Recordings, a three-disc compilation released by Universal's Hip-O Select division.

== Track listing ==
All songs written by Arthur Lee (as "Arthurly"), unless otherwise indicated.

Side A

1. "I'll Pray for You" – 3:50
2. "Abalony" – 1:50
3. "Signed D. C." – 5:15
4. "Listen to My Song" – 2:28
5. "I'm Down" – 4:48

Side B

1. "Stand Out" – 3:00
2. "Discharged" – 1:30
3. "Doggone" – 12:00

Side C

1. "I Still Wonder" (Jay Donnellan, Lee) – 3:05
2. "Love Is More Than Words or Better Late Than Never" – 11:20
3. "Nice to Be" – 1:50
4. "Car Lights On in the Daytime Blues" – 1:10

Side D

1. "Run to the Top" – 3:00
2. "Willow Willow" – 3:22
3. "Instra-Mental" – 3:00
4. "You Are Something" – 2:05
5. "Gather 'Round" – 5:50

== Personnel ==
Credits adapted from LP liner notes, unless otherwise indicated.

Love

- Arthur Lee (as "Arthurly") – lead vocals, rhythm guitar
- Jay Donnellan – lead guitar
- Frank Fayad – bass guitar; backing vocals
- George Suranovich – drums; backing vocals

Additional musicians

- Paul Martin – lead guitar (track 5)
- Drachen Theaker – drums (track 3)
- Jim Hobson – piano (track 1), organ (track 13)
- Gary Rowles – lead guitar (track 10)

Technical

- Arthur Lee (as "Arthurly") – producer, arranger; co-engineer
- Jay Donnellan – co-arranger (track 9)
- Burt Shonberg – cover painting
- George Gaal – engineer
