= Four Sail =

Studio album by Love
- Released: August 1969
- Recorded: September–October 1968
- Studio: A makeshift studio in a rented warehouse, Hollywood; Elektra Sound Recorders, Los Angeles
- Genre: Hard rock
- Length: 36:52
- Label: Elektra
- Producer: Arthur Lee

Love chronology
Forever Changes (1967)	Four Sail (1969)	Out Here (1969)

Four Sail is the fourth studio album by the American rock band Love, released in August 1969 by Elektra Records.

== Background ==
By mid-1968, Arthur Lee was the only remaining member of the Forever Changes line-up of Love. Lee quickly assembled a new band, including guitarist Jay Donnellan, drummer George Suranovich and bassist Frank Fayad. The album was rehearsed at Lee's house, and he later rented equipment from Wally Heider Studios with his own money and recorded the album in the Hollywood manufacturing district. Basic tracks were recorded in September 1968, while "Robert Montgomery" and additional overdubs were recorded at Elektra Sound Recorders that October. The quartet recorded a total of 27 songs.

Elektra Records's Jac Holzman then selected ten of these songs for release as an album, in order to fulfill Lee's contract. The resultant album, Four Sail, was released by Elektra in August 1969, while the remaining songs were issued by Blue Thumb Records as a double LP, Out Here, that December. With the exception of "Robert Montgomery", Lee's original mixes were enhanced with reverb by Elektra prior to their release on Four Sail, while "Talking in My Sleep" was completely remixed, due to tape damage.

Of the title, Lee explained in 2002, "I was at the end of my Elektra contract and this Four Sail means like a sign on a lawn ... it was actually 'Love for Sale', 'cause I'd had it with Elektra."

== Reception ==
Professional ratings
Review scores
Source	Rating
AllMusic	4/5 stars
Encyclopedia of Popular Music	4/5 stars

Writing for AllMusic, Eugene Chadbourne said that "The tracks are deep in feeling and performed with an emotional fervor that sometimes approaches anguish", and that the album "rises above the garage band sound to communicate a sense of time and place as well as some truly sincere feelings." He added that Four Sail might have been better received if released under Lee's own name. In 2019, Bob Stanley wrote in Record Collector that "[t]here was a time when people dismissed Love's very fine 1969 album Four Sail simply because it didn't sound like the sequel to Forever Changes," but noted the album had been "reclaimed" in later times.

In 2014, Four Sail was ranked number 1 on NME's list "101 Albums to Hear Before You Die".

== Track listing ==
All tracks are written by Arthur Lee, except where noted.

Side one
No.	Title	Writer(s)	Length
1.	"August"		5:00
2.	"Your Friend and Mine - Neil's Song"		3:40
3.	"I'm with You"		2:45
4.	"Good Times"		3:30
5.	"Singing Cowboy"	Lee, Jay Donnellan	4:30

Side two
No.	Title	Length
1.	"Dream"	2:49
2.	"Robert Montgomery"	3:34
3.	"Nothing"	4:44
4.	"Talking in My Sleep"	2:50
5.	"Always See Your Face"	3:30

2002 Elektra CD bonus tracks
No.	Title	Writer(s)	Length
11.	"Robert Montgomery" (alternate vocal)		3:41
12.	"Talking in My Sleep" (alternate mix)		2:55
13.	"Singing Cowboy" (unedited version)	Lee, Donnellan	5:52

== Personnel ==
Credits adapted from 2002 CD liner notes.

Love

- Arthur Lee – lead vocal, piano, harmonica, rhythm guitar, conga
- Jay Donnellan – lead guitar
- Frank Fayad – bass guitar, background vocals (tracks 6–7)
- George Suranovich – drums (tracks 1, 5–10), background vocals (tracks 6–7)

Additional musician

- Drachen Theaker – drums (tracks 2–4)

Technical

- Arthur Lee – producer, co-engineer
- George Gaal – engineer
- Peter Schaumann – illustration
- Ed Caraeff – photography
- William S. Harvey – art direction
