= Love (Love album) =

Studio album by Love
- Released: March 1966
- Recorded: January 24–27, 1966
- Studios: Sunset Sound Recorders, Hollywood, California
- Genres: Folk rock; garage rock; psychedelic rock; R&B
- Length: 36:03
- Label: Elektra
- Producers: Mark Abramson; Jac Holzman

Love chronology
Love (1966)	Da Capo (1966)

Love is the debut album by the American rock band Love, released in March 1966 by Elektra Records.

== Background ==
Arthur Lee, who was originally from Memphis, Tennessee, but had lived in Los Angeles since he was five, had been recording since 1963 with his bands, the LAG's and Lee's American Four. He had written and also produced the single "My Diary" for Rosa Lee Brooks in 1964 which featured Jimi Hendrix on guitar. A garage outfit, The Sons Of Adam, which included future Love drummer Michael Stuart, also recorded a Lee composition, "Feathered Fish". However, after viewing a performance by the Byrds, Lee became determined to form a group that joined the newly minted folk-rock sound of the Byrds to his primarily rhythm and blues style.

Singer-songwriter and guitarist Bryan MacLean, whom Lee had met when he was working as a roadie for the Byrds, joined the band just before they changed their name from the Grass Roots to Love, spurred by the release of a single by another group called the Grass Roots. MacLean had also been playing guitar in bands since about 1963 but picked up music early. Neighbor Frederick Loewe, of the composers Lerner & Loewe, recognized him as a "melodic genius" at the age of three as he doodled on the piano. Also joining the band was another Memphis native, lead guitarist Johnny Echols. From L.A. was drummer Don Conka. A short time later, Conka was replaced by Alban "Snoopy" Pfisterer. Love's first bassist, Johnny Fleckenstein, went on to join the Standells in 1967. Fleckenstein was replaced by Ken Forssi (formerly of a post-"Wipe Out" lineup of the Surfaris).

== Recording and music ==
Ten of the album's fourteen tracks were recorded at Sunset Sound Recorders in Hollywood on January 24–27, 1966. The remaining four tracks ("A Message to Pretty", "My Flash on You", "Emotions", and "Mushroom Clouds") come from another, undocumented session during that period.

Love features a mixture of folk rock, garage rock, psychedelic rock. and R&B. The first rock album issued on then-folk giant Elektra Records, the album begins with the group's radical reworking of the Burt Bacharach-Hal David song "My Little Red Book" and also features "Signed D.C." (allegedly a reference to one-time Love drummer Don Conka), along with the poignant "A Message to Pretty".

== Release and reception ==
Professional ratings
Review scores
Source	Rating
AllMusic	4.5/5 stars
The Encyclopedia of Popular Music	3/5 stars
Rolling Stone Album Guide	3.5/5 stars

The album sold approximately 150,000 copies.

In a retrospective review of the album, Richie Unterberger for AllMusic called it "their hardest-rocking early album and their most Byrds-influenced." He also stated, "Arthur Lee's songwriting muse hadn't fully developed at this stage, and in comparison with their second and third efforts, this is the least striking of the LPs featuring their classic lineup, with some similar-sounding folk-rock compositions and stock riffs."

=== 2001 CD reissue ===
The 2001 CD reissue presents both monaural and stereophonic mixes of the album, as well as an alternate take of "Signed D.C." and "No. Fourteen", the B-side to the "7 and 7 Is" single.

== Legacy ==
The stark instrumental "Emotions" is used uncredited in Haskell Wexler's 1969 film Medium Cool as a recurring theme.

"My Little Red Book" was featured over the final credits of the movie High Fidelity in 2000, and the Beverly Hills, 90210 episode "Alone at the Top" in 1995.

== Track listing ==
All tracks are written by Arthur Lee, except where indicated.

Side one
No.	Title	Writer(s)	Length
1.	"My Little Red Book"	Burt Bacharach, Hal David	2:38
2.	"Can't Explain"	Lee, John Echols, John Fleckenstein	2:41
3.	"A Message to Pretty"		3:13
4.	"My Flash on You"		2:09
5.	"Softly to Me"	Bryan MacLean	2:57
6.	"No Matter What You Do"		2:46
7.	"Emotions"	Lee, John Echols	2:01

Side two
No.	Title	Writer(s)	Length
8.	"You I'll Be Following"		2:26
9.	"Gazing"		2:42
10.	"Hey Joe"	Billy Roberts	2:42
11.	"Signed D.C."		2:47
12.	"Colored Balls Falling"		1:55
13.	"Mushroom Clouds"	Lee, John Echols, Ken Forssi, Bryan MacLean	2:25
14.	"And More"	Lee, Bryan MacLean	2:57
Total length:			36:03

== Personnel ==
Love

- Arthur Lee – lead vocals, percussion, harmonica, drums on "Can't Explain", "No Matter What You Do", "Gazing", and "And More".
- Johnny Echols – lead guitar
- Bryan MacLean – rhythm guitar, vocals, lead vocals on "Softly to Me" and "Hey Joe".
- Ken Forssi – bass guitar
- Alban "Snoopy" Pfisterer – drums

Additional personnel

According to the box set Love Story, the tracks "A Message to Pretty" and "My Flash on You" may feature John Fleckenstein on bass and Don Conka on drums in place of Forssi and Pfisterer, respectively.

== Singles ==
- "My Little Red Book" b/w "A Message to Pretty" (Elektra 45603)
- "No. Fourteen" (from these sessions, B side of "7 & 7 Is" - Elektra 45605)
- "Hey Joe" (B side to rare "¡Que Vida!" single - Elektra 45613)

== Release history ==
Date	Label	Format	Country	Catalog	Notes
March 1966	Elektra	LP	US	EKL-4001	Original mono release.
March 1966	Elektra	LP	US	EKS-74001	Original stereo release.
March 1966	Elektra	LP	UK	EKL-4001	Original mono release.
March 1966	Elektra	LP	UK	EKS-74001	Original stereo release.
1969	Elektra	LP	US	EKS-74001	
1973	Elektra	LP	UK	K32002	
1987	Edsel	LP	UK	ED 218	
1988	Elektra	CD	US	74001-2	Original CD release.
June 25, 1991	Elektra	CD	Japan	WMC5-380	Reissue of the original mono release.
2001	Elektra/Warner Strategic Marketing	CD	UK & Europe	8122 73567-2	Reissue containing both mono and stereo mixes including an alternate take of "Signed D.C." and "No. Fourteen", the B-side to the "7 and 7 Is" single.
2001	Elektra	CD	US	81227 99187 6	Reissue of the original stereo release.
December 11, 2001	Sundazed	LP	US	LP 5100	Reissue of the original stereo release.
October 14, 2015	Elektra	CD	Japan	WPCR-16836	Reissue of the original stereo release including a mono mix of "My Little Red Book" as a bonus track.
