= Ken Forssi =

American musician (1943–1998)

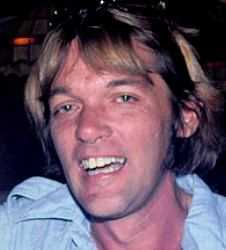
- Ken Forssi in 1980 in Tampa, Florida.

Background information
- Born: Kenneth Raymond Forssi; March 30, 1943; Cleveland, Ohio, US
- Origin: Sarasota, Florida
- Died: January 5, 1998 (aged 54) Tallahassee, Florida
- Occupation: Musician
- Instrument: Bass guitar
- Years active: 1963–1998
- Labels: Elektra Records, Decca Records

Kenneth Raymond Forssi (March 30, 1943 – January 5, 1998) was an American musician, best known as the original bass player in the band Love.

== Early life ==
He was born in Cleveland, Ohio, the older of two sons, along with brother Charles, born to Raymond B. and Lola G. Forssi. When he was about 9 years old, his family moved to Siesta Key, on the Florida west coast, and shortly thereafter to the nearby city of Sarasota. Ken Forssi attended Sarasota High School where he demonstrated considerable talent in engineering drawing. Several pen and ink drawings, of the multi-geared transmission of a helicopter and of a large jet aircraft engine, won local prizes, and he was encouraged to follow a career in that field. He also proved to be mechanically skilled as a teenager, working on both motorcycles and cars, sometimes as a paid part-time employee of local businesses. He was eventually employed as a draftsman at a large Sarasota aerospace engineering company.

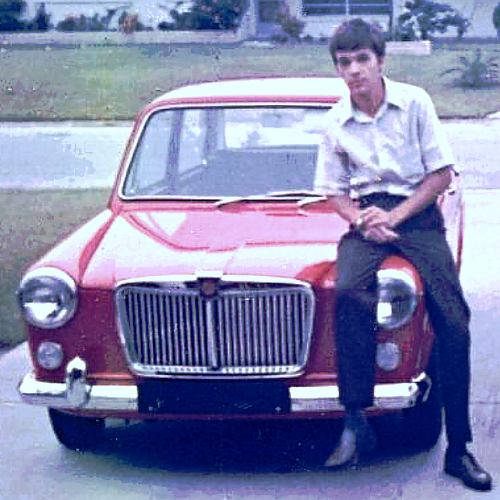
Ken Forssi in Sarasota, Florida, just before his 1964 move to California.

Music was a modest part of his life then, but as his skill on the bass guitar increased, he was hired for a number of engagements with local groups.

Forssi was a good enough artist that he obtained a scholarship to the Art Center College of Design in Pasadena, California. Along with several Sarasota friends, he migrated to Anaheim, California in 1964, and began commuting to the school. At this time, his interest in music became much more intense. His natural ability was substantial, and he learned new techniques very rapidly. In fact, his ability was soon sufficient to earn a position as bass player in a late-period lineup of The Surfaris, a group that previously rose to brief fame with their first record "Wipe Out", which according to "The Illustrated Book of Rock Records" is the number one surf hit of all time (based on record sales and chart positions).

== Love ==
Forssi continued to attend college and study art, using his earnings from The Surfaris' Japanese tour to rent an apartment closer to the school. He found a roommate, Alban "Snoopy" Pfisterer, who was also a student there. In 1965 he met Arthur Lee, who then had a band called Grass Roots (a name that was rapidly dropped under legal pressure from the better-known band of the same name) and was greatly impressed. Lee hired Forssi as bassist, and soon officially formed Love. Shortly thereafter, Snoopy Pfisterer could also be found with the group, as an occasional substitute drummer. Forssi was a true believer, along with many new fans, in the artistic talent of Lee, and in the quality of the band.

Love proved to be quite popular and successful in 1966–1968, especially in California, and Forssi was now a rock star. The band released three albums over a two-year period: (Love, Da Capo, and Forever Changes). Forssi's work on some of these has been highly praised, particularly the hit, "7 and 7 Is".

== After Love ==
The success of Love was short-lived though, and the original group broke up. For a time, his considerable talent as a bassist gained him studio session work and offers to join various other rock groups. He played briefly with a band called "The Elves Themselves" and worked on a record with Jimi Hendrix. During that time Forssi had no steady job. He never again reached any level of fame.

After the original members of Love scattered, Forssi moved back to Sarasota in the early 1970s, where he found fewer and fewer opportunities to use his musical talents. He mostly worked at various odd jobs over the years, his employment usually hampered by long-term substance-abuse problems which seem to have started during the years of fame.

During Forssi's last years, he became very concerned about the possible existence of world political conspiracies. In the early 1990s he moved to the little town of Greenville, Florida, where his mother then lived. Forssi died in nearby Tallahassee on January 5, 1998, according to his Tallahassee Democrat obituary, due to a brain tumor.

== Sources ==
- Michael Stuart-Ware (2003). Behind the Scenes on the Pegasus Carousel with the Legendary Rock Group Love. London: Helter Skelter Pub.
- Andrew Hultkrans (2003). Forever Changes. New York, London: Continuum International Pub. Group. ISBN 9780826414939.
- "Kenneth R. Forssi", obituary, January 13, 1998, The Tallahassee Democrat.
- "Interview with "Snoopy" Pfisterer from Zigzag magazine". Archived from the original on September 29, 2007.
