= Johnny Echols =

American songwriter and guitarist (born 1947)

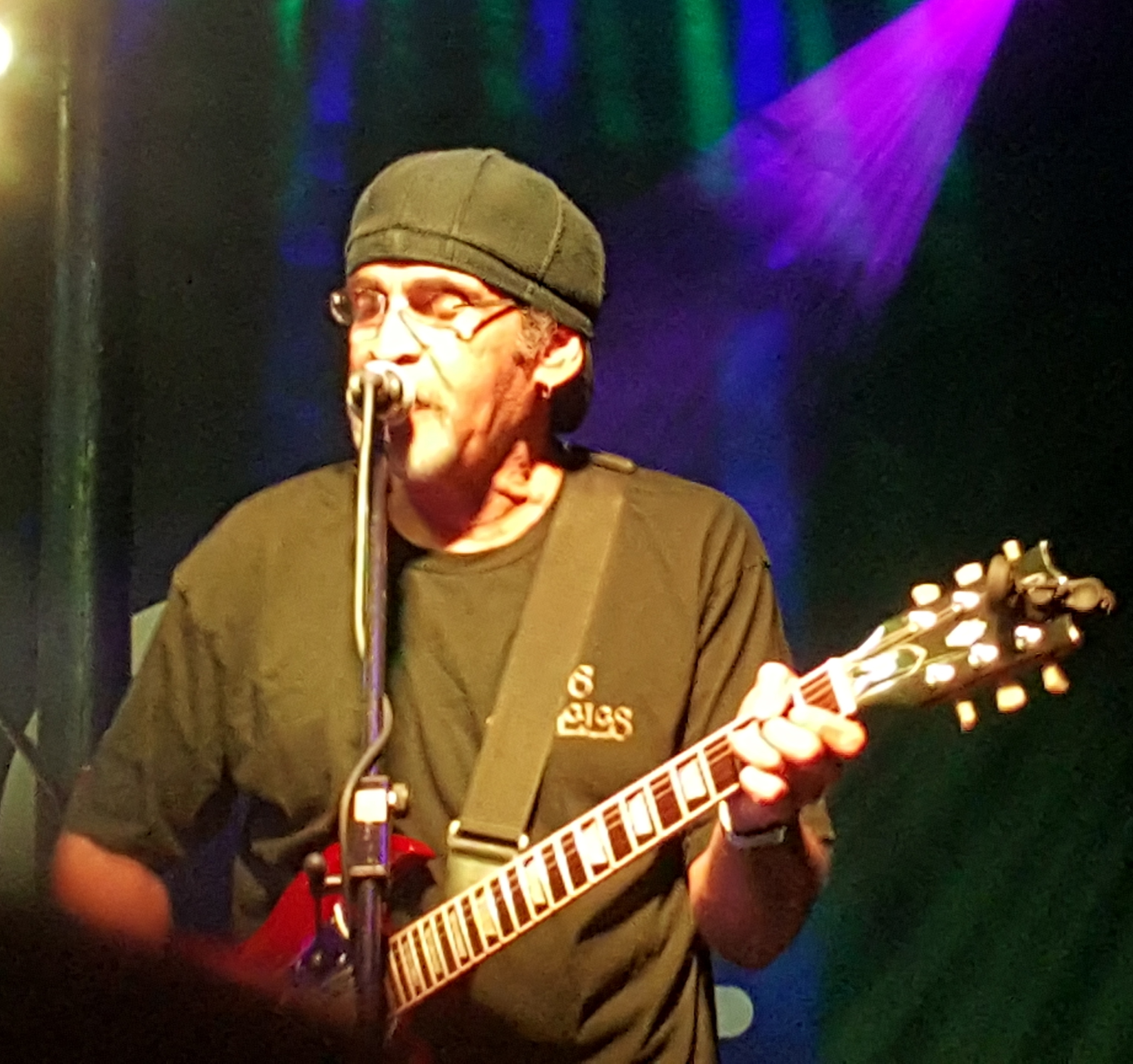
- Echols onstage with The Love Band, July 2019, Bristol, England

Background information
- Born: John Marshall Echols; February 21, 1947 (age 79); Memphis, Tennessee, United States
- Origin: Los Angeles, California, United States
- Genres: Rock
- Occupation: Musician
- Instrument: Guitar
- Years active: 1960s-present

John Marshall Echols (/ˈɛkəlz/; born February 21, 1947) is an American songwriter and guitarist, who was a co-founder and the lead guitar player of the psychedelic rock band Love.

== Early life and career ==
Johnny Echols was born in Memphis, Tennessee. He moved with his family to Los Angeles, California, in the late 1950s, and re-established a childhood friendship with Arthur Lee, who had also moved to the city from Memphis a few years earlier; their respective families were friends. Echols began playing guitar as a child, and in his teens played in bands with Billy Preston, Marilyn McCoo, Clarence McDonald and others. Echols and Lee both attended Dorsey High School, and decided to form a band. The band became "Arthur Lee and the L.A.G.'s" (an allusion to Booker T. and the M.G.'s) before splitting up. Lee and Echols then formed The American Four, later re-named The Grass Roots, and finally re-named Love in 1965. Echols also worked as a studio musician alongside Glen Campbell and others.

== Career with Love ==
Echols contributed as lead guitarist and writer to Love's first three albums: Love, on which he is credited as co-writer of three songs; Da Capo, credited as co-writer of the side-long improvised track "Revelation" and Forever Changes, often cited as one of the greatest rock albums of all time. Forever Changes comprised songs written by Lee and by fellow band member Bryan MacLean. The record company, Elektra Records, would only release a single rather than a double album, and songs written by Echols for a possible companion album, tentatively titled Gethsemane, were never recorded by the band. In 1968, the band split up: they were performing less frequently; sales of Forever Changes were disappointing; there were personal disagreements among the band members; MacLean was considering a solo contract with Elektra; and most of the band members, including Echols and his housemate, bassist Ken Forssi, had become heroin users. However, rumors that Echols and Forssi robbed donut shops to support their habit are unfounded.

== Later activities ==
Echols moved to New York City, where he gave up drugs, worked as a studio musician with Miles Davis and others, and taught guitar. He moved to Arizona in the 1980s. Occasional attempts by Lee and others to reconstitute Love did not bear fruit until 2003, when Echols joined Lee and his backing band, Baby Lemonade, onstage in Los Angeles. Echols toured with the band in 2004 and 2005, though the 2005 European tour was without Arthur, who cancelled at the last minute due, they were to find out later, to the cancer that he died from. After Lee's death in 2006, Echols continued to perform with Baby Lemonade, billed as "Love Revisited" (2016) or "The Love Band featuring Johnny Echols" (2019).
