= Arthur Lee (musician) =

American rock musician (1945–2006)

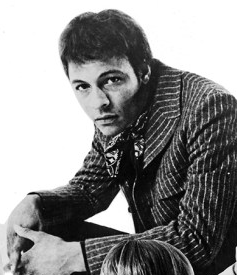
- Lee in 1967

Background information
- Born: Arthur Porter Taylor; March 7, 1945; Memphis, Tennessee, U.S.
- Died: August 3, 2006 (aged 61) Memphis, Tennessee, U.S.
- Genres: Psychedelic rock; folk rock
- Occupations: Musician; songwriter
- Instruments: Vocals; guitar; drums; keyboards
- Years active: 1963–1996; 2001–2006
- Formerly of: Love
- Website: lovearthurlee.com

Arthur Taylor Lee (born Arthur Porter Taylor; March 7, 1945 – August 3, 2006) was an American musician, singer and songwriter who rose to fame as the leader of the Los Angeles rock band Love. Love's 1967 album Forever Changes was inducted into the Grammy Hall of Fame and is part of the National Recording Registry.

== Early life ==
Lee was born in Memphis, Tennessee, on March 7, 1945, in John Gaston Hospital, to Agnes (née Porter), a school teacher, and Chester Taylor, a local jazz musician and cornet player. As an only child, Lee was known by the nickname "Po", short for Porter, and was looked after by additional family members so his mother could proceed with her teaching career. With his father being his first connection with a musician, Lee was fascinated by music at a young age. He would sing and hum along to blues musicians such as Howlin' Wolf and Muddy Waters on the radio. At the age of four, Lee made his debut on the stage at a Baptist church, reciting a small poem about a red telephone.

In the early 1950s, his parents separated, as his father "refused or neglected to provide for her", the divorce petition states. Lee remembered seeing his father only three times during his entire life. Subsequently, Lee and his mother packed their things and took a train to California, while his father was at work. Lee and his mother resided in Los Angeles permanently in 1952. In 1953, their divorce was granted and his mother married Clinton Lee, a successful construction worker, on April 23, 1955. Lee was formally adopted by Clinton Lee on June 6, 1960, legally acquiring his surname, after filing for an adoption notice in 1958. His mother was able to resume her teaching career, enabling the family to buy a new home in the West Adams area of South Central Los Angeles. The neighborhood was also home to Johnny Echols (future co-founder, lead guitarist, and vocalist of Love), who attended the same schools as Lee.

Lee attended Sixth Avenue Elementary School and excelled in athletics but was behind academically. Being known as "the toughest kid in the neighborhood", he was pressured into succeeding in school by his great-aunt, a former school principal, but showed interest in sports, music, reading, and animals. He later attended Mount Vernon Junior High, where his interest in music would soon outweigh his focus on sports.

Lee took lessons from a teacher in his first musical instrument, the accordion. He adapted to reading music and developed a good ear and natural musical intelligence. While he was never formally taught about musical theory and composition, he was able to mimic musicians from records and compose his own songs. Eventually he persuaded his parents to buy him an organ and harmonica. Graduating from Susan Miller Dorsey High School, Lee's musical ambitions found opportunities between his local community and classmates. As opposed to attending a college under a sports scholarship, he strived for a musical career. Echols influenced Arthur's plan to form a band, after seeing him perform "Johnny B. Goode" with a five-piece band at a school assembly.

== Career ==
=== Pre-Love ===
His first known recording is from 1963. The Ninth Wave (Capitol Records 4980) was released by his first band, the instrumental outfit called The LAGs, a Booker T & The MG's type of unit which included Echols, Lee (organ), Allan Talbert (saxophone), and Roland Davis (drums).

As a songwriter, Lee composed the surf songs "White Caps" and "Ski Surfin' Sanctuary". "My Diary" is the first Lee composition that came near to being a hit. It was written when Arthur was a teenager, about his teenage sweetheart Anita Billings. Later it was the R&B singer Rosa Lee Brooks who performed and recorded it for Revis Records. This recording included Jimi Hendrix on electric guitar. In a 2005 interview, Lee stated that he was looking for a guitarist with a Curtis Mayfield–like feel, and Hendrix was recommended for the session by label owner Billy Revis.

Lee wrote "I've Been Tryin'" for Little Ray. "Luci Baines", a song about President Lyndon Johnson's daughter, was performed and recorded with Lee's new band, The American Four. He composed "Everybody Jerk" and "Slow Jerk" for Ronnie and the Pomona Casuals, a band that put out an LP on the Donna label featuring some vocals by Lee. These early recordings are very rare but have been collected on a 1997 bootleg CD. The American Four however have since been reissued as a 45 and are also available now on iTunes.

=== Love ===
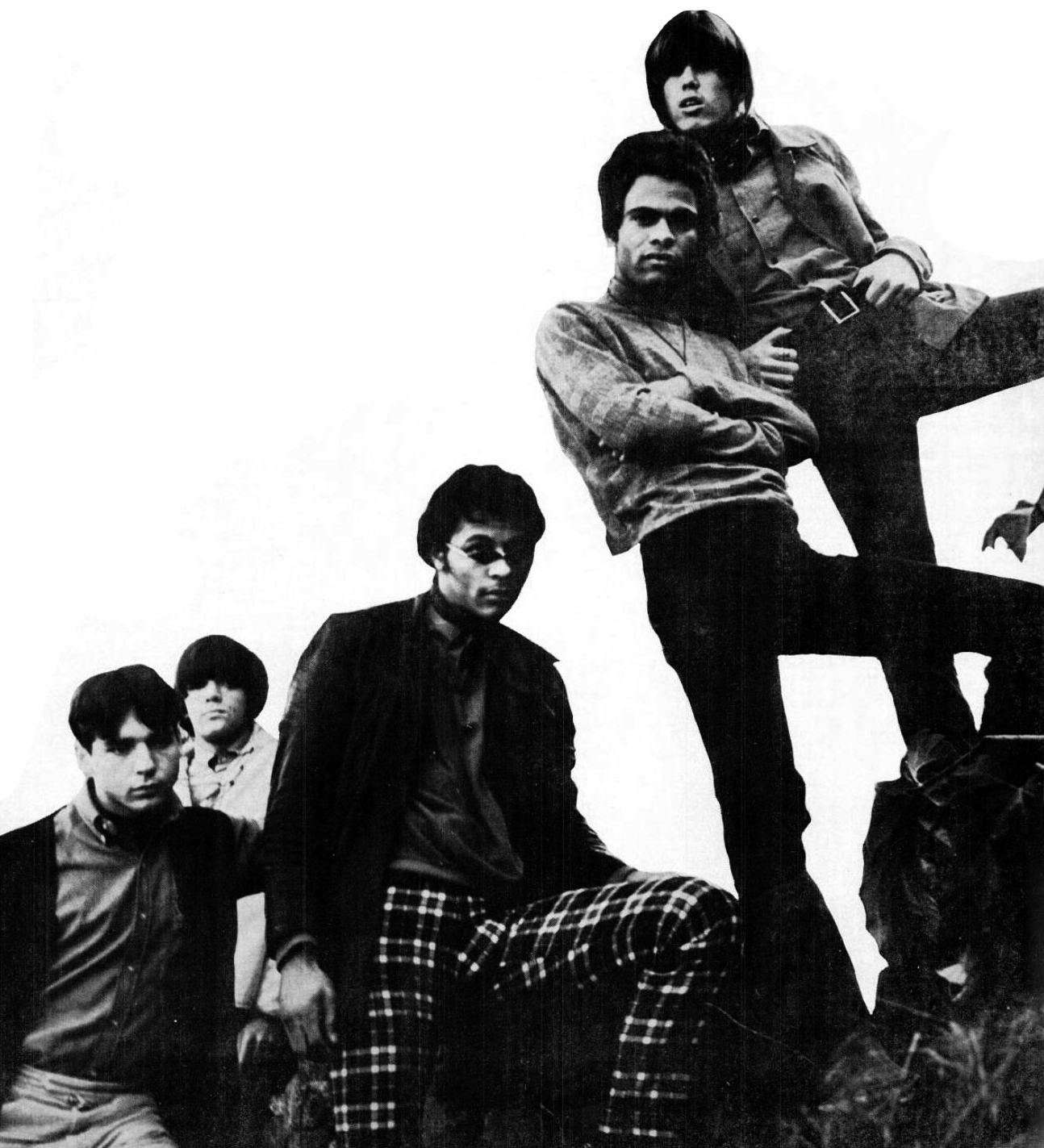
Love in 1966

Lee said when he first heard The Byrds he felt vindicated since he'd already been writing music that had a similar folk rock sound. In 1965, the Grass Roots, his folk rock unit, changed their name to Love because there was already a signed act called The Grass Roots.

Lee's early appearances were at clubs in Hollywood, including the Brave New World; Hullabaloo; Bido Lito's; and the Sea Witch. At Bido Lito's, a tiny hole-in-the-wall club located on a cul-de-sac known as Cosmo's Alley, Lee first showed his potential for excellence. The Bido Lito's audience was sometimes dotted with celebrities, including actor Sal Mineo, and rock stars Mick Jagger, Brian Jones, Bob Dylan, and Jimi Hendrix, who would go on to collaborate with Lee on future recording projects. Lee then got the opportunity to play the larger Whisky a Go Go on Los Angeles' Sunset Strip, after which Love received a recording contract by Elektra Records. Love received a lot of air play in Los Angeles, and performed several times in 1967 at the Cheetah nightclub in Venice, California.

Love's music has been described as a mixture of psychedelic rock, folk-rock, baroque pop, Spanish-tinged pop, R&B, garage rock, and even protopunk. Lee has been regarded as "the first punk rocker" but wasn't flattered by the phrase as he thought the term punk meant "being somebody's bitch or something like that." Though Lee's vocals have garnered some comparisons to Johnny Mathis, his lyrics often dwell on matters dark and vexing, but often with a wry humor. The group's cover of the Burt Bacharach/Hal David composition "My Little Red Book" (first recorded by Manfred Mann for the soundtrack of What's New Pussycat?) received a thumbs-down from Bacharach: Love had altered the song's chord changes. Nonetheless, the record was a Southern California hit and won Lee and Love a spot on American Bandstand.

Love (1966) included their cover of "My Little Red Book". "Emotions", an instrumental track from the album, is used in the opening credits of the 1969 movie Medium Cool. Their second album, Da Capo (1966), featured just one song, "Revelation" on side two. The first side contained six individual songs, including their only single to achieve any success in the Billboard Top 40 chart: "7 and 7 Is". Da Capo has been described as Jazz-Rock (or Jazz Fusion with its inclusion of flute and saxophone.) Forever Changes (1967) followed, the album a centerpiece of the group's psychedelic-tinged sound, bolstered by David Angel's orchestral arrangements. Forever Changes sold moderately in its time (reaching No. 154 on the Billboard 200, and stayed on the chart for 10 weeks, without the benefit of a hit single), although it reached the top 30 in the UK. Nonetheless, its cult status grew.

After Forever Changes, the band managed to record one more non-album single ("Your Mind and We Belong Together" b/w "Laughing Stock") which was released in June 1968 and failed to chart. Love then dissolved due to drug and money issues, only to have Lee revive the group name shortly thereafter. The new Love featured a lineup consisting of Lee on vocals and guitar, Jay Donnellan on guitar, Frank Fayad on bass, and George Suranovich on drums despite a few tracks featuring The Crazy World of Arthur Brown drummer Drachen Theaker. Lee signed a record deal with Bob Krasnow's Blue Thumb label during this time, but without mentioning to Krasnow that he was technically still signed to Elektra Records. Lee had wanted out of his Elektra deal since 1966 (the year the self-titled debut was released).

Elektra founder Jac Holzman did not want to let Lee out of his contract as he admired his talents but he also did not want to keep an artist under contract who did not want to stay, so a deal was worked out that allowed Lee to record for Blue Thumb with Holzman getting his choice of ten of the resulting songs to fulfill the Elektra contract of a fourth album. That album would become Four Sail (1969), Lee's pun on his original title "For Sale". A mere three months after the release of Four Sail, Blue Thumb records released their Love album, Out Here, using remaining tracks from the sessions.

Out Here featured the same musicians as Four Sail with the addition of Gary Rowles, who played on one track. Lee felt that Donnellan was getting a little too egotistical for his tastes. The new lineup consisted of musicians who were not fans of Forever Changes, resulting in a harder-edged rock sound. During the initial Four Sail/Out Here sessions, Krasnow approached Lee about the possibility of rounding up the original members of Love. Krasnow felt there was some magic missing with the new line up. Lee obliged him, and started rehearsing and even recording some with original members Echols, Forssi, and Stuart (MacLean had turned him down).

Heroin proved to be too dominant in the lives of Echols and Forssi. Both men were constantly pawning off the rented equipment for drug money and were eventually let go yet again. Love also toured both Four Sail and Out Here for their first trip to Europe, where they were always more popular, and went on to do a nationally televised performance on Dutch television which also featured promotional videos for older songs from the Elektra years. Out Here managed to chart at No. 29 in the UK in May 1970.

The next album to appear from Love was False Start (1970) which continued on with the heavier sonic direction of acid rock, in addition to featuring elements of classic R&B. One new member was added to this incarnation of Love, a vocalist/guitarist named Nooney Rickett. The album's opening track, "The Everlasting First", features Jimi Hendrix on guitar.

Lee met Hendrix while in England, and they decided to record at Bob Krasnow's expense. For years there were rumors that Arthur and Jimi recorded an entire record together, but the truth surfaced in 2009 when an acetate from Blue Thumb made rounds and it was revealed that there was only a long jam session (titled "Jam" on the actual acetate, to accompany The Everlasting First and an early version of the Hendrix song "Ezy Rider"). According to legend, Arthur overheard Bob Krasnow telling someone that if the False Start album did not crack the top 10 he was going to release the band from its contract. Moreover, Arthur made Krasnow give him that in writing. The album did not even reach the top 200 on the Billboard charts.

In 1971, Lee was signed to Columbia Records and spent the better part of the summer recording; all of the songs were deemed unworthy of issue (the entire Columbia project, along with a handful of demos, was released for the first time in 2009 on Sundazed Music as "Love Lost").

=== Solo career ===
In July 1972, Lee released his first solo album, Vindicator, on A&M Records, featuring a new group of musicians also playing as the band Love. At one point in time they would use the name Bandaid, a name originally suggested by Jimi Hendrix for a briefly considered lineup of himself, Lee, and Steve Winwood. This album failed to chart. Lee recorded a second solo album in 1973 entitled Black Beauty for Buffalo Records, but the label folded before the album was released. Lee contributed the title track to the 1974 blaxploitation film Thomasine & Bushrod. Lee's next move was to credit the backing group for Black Beauty with the addition of guitarist John Sterling as a new Love for Reel to Real (1974).

A new Lee solo album, called just Arthur Lee, appeared on Rhino Records in 1981, featuring covers of The Bobbettes' "Mr. Lee" and Jimmy Cliff's "Many Rivers to Cross" and musicians Sterling (guitar), George Suranovich (drums), and Kim Kesterson (bass), as well as some of the members from "Reel to Real".

Throughout the 1970s and 1980s, there were various attempts to reunite the original Love lineup. At the suggestion of guitarist John Sterling who first joined Arthur for Reel To Real, one such show from the Whisky in October 1978 was recorded by Sterling on cassette. It featuring Lee and Bryan MacLean with Sterling (guitar), George Suranovich (drums), and Kim Kesterson (bass), and was released on Rhino as a live album picture disc entitled Love Live (1980) on Rhino Records. In 1982, MCA released Studio/Live, which was a collection of tracks from the early 1970s incarnation of Love coordinated by rock lawyer/journalist Stann Findelle, including never before heard tracks recorded from Bill Graham's Fillmore East.

Apart from the Studio/Live package on MCA, the 1980s were a mostly fallow period for Lee. According to him: "I was gone for a decade. I went back to my old neighborhood to take care of my father, who was dying of cancer. I was tired of signing autographs. I was tired of being BS'd out of my money...I just got tired." Alice Cooper did record a cover version of Lee's "7 and 7 Is" on a 1981 album, Special Forces.

Lee re-emerged musically in 1992 with a new album entitled Arthur Lee & Love -{Five String Serenade} on the French New Rose label. The title track, "Five String Serenade", was later recorded by Mazzy Star and Jack White of The White Stripes. The album also featured a new artist he discovered from San Francisco, Keith Farrish aka Demian X Diamond. He performed live around this time in Paris, London, and Liverpool. In 1993 he played shows in New York and England. The following year he released a 45 rpm single, "Girl on Fire" backed with "Midnight Sun", on Distortions Records. He began to tour regularly with a backup band comprising former members of Das Damen, and LA group Baby Lemonade. In 1995, Rhino Records released the compilation Love Story. The album was a two-disc set with extensive liner notes that chronicled the period of 1966–1972.

== Later years ==
=== Prison ===
In late 1996, Lee was sentenced to 12 years for the negligent discharge of a firearm. California's three strikes law meant Lee was forced to serve a prison term, having previously served two years in jail for arson, and having been charged with various drug, driving and assault offenses.

Lee denied that he had fired the gun, and visiting fan Doug Thomas who had denied involvement when the police responded later confessed to the deed. A year-delayed analysis of a gunpowder residue test conducted on Lee produced a negative result. Had he pleaded guilty, Lee would have been sentenced to nine months in jail; instead, he chose a jury trial and was convicted. His sentence was pronounced at 12 years in prison.

While in prison Lee refused visitors and interviews. "I thought I would beat this case, so why would I want to broadcast it? This has been so humiliating to me."

Former bandmates Bryan MacLean and Ken Forssi both died while Lee was incarcerated, ending any speculation as to a full-fledged Love reunion.

On December 12, 2001, Lee was released from prison, having served five years and six months of his original sentence. With the trial prosecutor having been found guilty of misconduct, a federal appeals court in California reversed the charge of negligent discharge of a firearm.

=== Last years ===
Following Lee's release from prison, he put together a new incarnation of Love and planned a Forever Changes 35th Anniversary Tour, to kick off at the Royal Festival Hall in London.

Three Love tracks, "My Little Red Book" (from Love) as well as "Always See Your Face" and "Your Friend and Mine" (both from Four Sail), were included on the soundtrack for the film adaptation of Nick Hornby's High Fidelity. "Always See Your Face" also appears on the soundtrack for Greta Gerwig's 2017 film Lady Bird. Other of Lee's songs have been heard in other films as well, notably "7 & 7 Is" in both 1990's Point Break and 1996's Bottle Rocket.

In 2002, Lee began touring in earnest under the name "Love with Arthur Lee". He performed throughout Europe, North America, and Australia. This incarnation of Love was composed of the members of the band Baby Lemonade, who had first performed with Lee in May 1993 at Raji's. The band began performing the Forever Changes album in its entirety, often with a string and horn section. A live CD and DVD of this material was released in 2003.

Johnny Echols joined the new group for a special Forever Changes 35th Anniversary Tour performance at Royce Hall, UCLA, in the spring of 2003.

Also in 2003, Lee contributed to a session by jazz drummer Chico Hamilton's band, performing the vocal on Mary Lou Williams' song "What's your story morning glory?".

Lee and Love continued to tour throughout 2003 and 2004, including many concerts in and around hometown Los Angeles, notably a show at the outdoor Sunset Junction Street Fair, the San Diego Street Scene, and a headlining date with The Zombies at the Ebell Theatre. Echols occasionally joined Lee and the group on the continuing and final tours of 2004 to 2005. They played a well received date at the Fillmore in San Francisco with the full string and horn section.

At this time, Lee had been diagnosed with acute myeloid leukemia. Choosing not to reveal his illness to the band, Lee announced that he would not be able to participate in the final tour in July 2005. Since no one in the band knew the basis of his absence, Lee's decision to forgo the final tour was met with mixed reactions. The remaining members of the band, along with Echols, continued to perform at the venues of the last tour (July 2005) without Lee, under the name The Love Band. At the end of September 2005, Lee moved to Memphis, Tennessee, where he planned to continue to make music using the name Love. Joining him was to be drummer Greg Roberson (Reigning Sound, Her Majesty's Buzz, Compulsive Gamblers) to put together a new line-up in Memphis, which was to include Adam Woodard, Alex Greene (The Reigning Sound, Big Ass Truck), Jack "Oblivian" Yarber, Alicja Trout, and Johnny Echols from the original Love line-up. Ultimately Arthur's ill health prevented this from happening.

In April 2006, it was publicly announced that Lee was ill. A tribute fund was set up shortly after the announcement, with a series of benefit concerts to be performed to help pay medical bills. The most notable of these concerts was produced by Steve Weitzman of SW Productions at New York's Beacon Theatre on June 23, 2006, and featured Robert Plant, Ian Hunter, Ryan Adams, Nils Lofgren, Yo La Tengo, Garland Jeffreys, Johnny Echols (Love's original lead guitarist), and Flashy Python & The Body Snatchers (featuring Alec Ounsworth of Clap Your Hands Say Yeah). Backed by Ian Hunter's band, Plant performed 12 songs, including four Led Zeppelin songs and five recorded by Love in the 1960s ("7 and 7 Is", "A House Is Not A Motel", "Bummer in the Summer", "Old Man", and "Hey Joe"). A benefit concert was held in Dublin, Ireland.

=== Death ===
Lee underwent several months of treatment for leukemia, to include chemotherapy and an experimental stem cell transplant using stem cells from an umbilical cord blood donor. Despite treatment, his condition continued to worsen, and he died from complications of leukemia in Memphis, Tennessee, on August 3, 2006, at the age of 61.

== Legacy ==
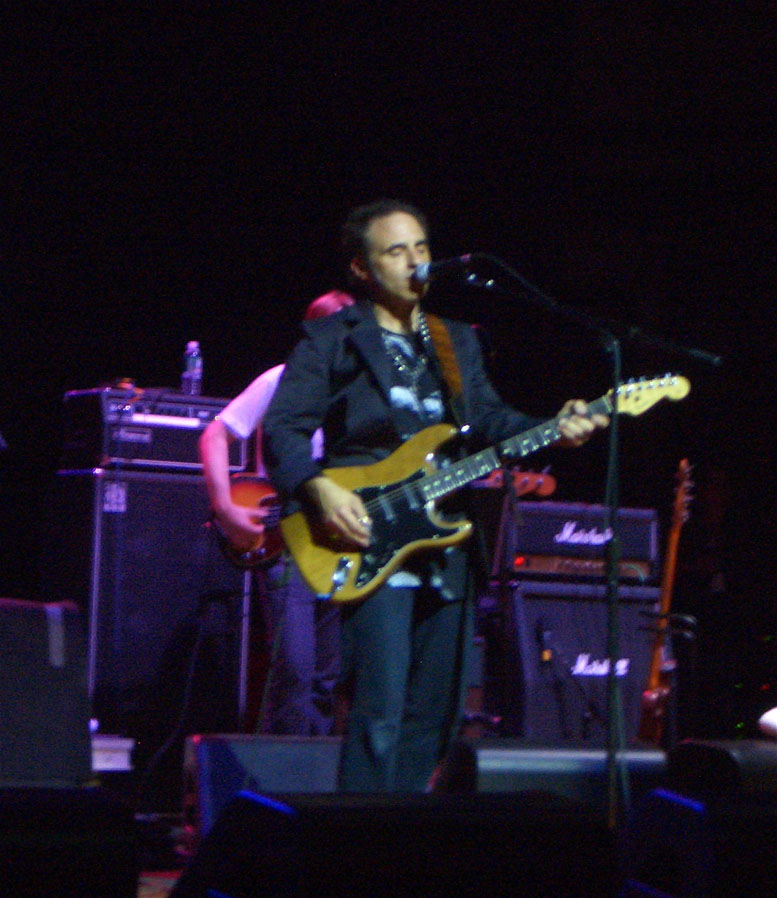
Nils Lofgren performing at the Beacon Theatre Benefit For Arthur Lee, June 23, 2006

Barclay James Harvest's song a "A tale of Two Sixties" from the 1978 album XII contains the lines "Give me the sound of Arthur Lee, with Forever Changes I remember, "andmoreagain ", don't leave me ever."

Robyn Hitchcock's 1993 song "The Wreck of the Arthur Lee" from the Robyn Hitchcock and the Egyptians album Respect was written as a tribute to the singer.

Arthur Lee is mentioned in the song "Are You Ready to Be Heartbroken", by Lloyd Cole & the Commotions, as well as in the song "Mate of the Bloke", by Half Man Half Biscuit. His prison term is the subject of "The Prison's Going Down" by ex-Stranglers singer and guitarist Hugh Cornwell. Lee is the subject of the song "Byrds Turn to Stone" (originally titled "Mr Lee") by Liverpool band (and former Arthur Lee backing group) Shack.

Rival Schools and Quicksand frontman Walter Schreifels paid tribute to Arthur Lee on his 2010 solo album An Open Letter to the Scene with a track titled "Arthur Lee's Lullaby".

The 2009 Communion album by the Swedish band The Soundtrack of Our Lives features a song entitled "The Fan Who Wasn't There" which was based on a conversation singer Ebbot Lundberg had with Lee.

Directors Mike Kerry and Chris Hall managed to persuade Arthur Lee to cooperate in the making of a UK documentary film Love Story (2006), successfully recording the last interviews with a reflective Arthur Lee, before he was diagnosed with leukemia. The film shows interviews with key individuals from some of the line-ups of Love and Elektra management and studio engineers.

Rapper Mac Miller covered Lee's 1972 song "Everybody's Gotta Live" on his posthumous sixth studio album Circles (2020), on the song "Everybody."

Lee's composition "Signed D. C." was about heroin addiction and written as a tribute to Love's drummer Don Conka. It has been covered by a multitude of artists such as The Rising Storm (1983), Shockabilly (1984), Grant Hart, which appears on his All of My Senses EP (1992), The White Stripes which was recorded in 1997 and released in 2011 on a single. Bluesman Michael Powers included it on his Prodigal Son album which was released in 2007.

Russian psychedelic/punk rock band Grazhdanskaya Oborona dedicated their last album Zachem snyatsya sny? (English: Why Do We Have Dreams?) to the memory of Arthur Lee.

In 2012, Rolling Stone magazine ranked Forever Changes 40th in its list of the 500 greatest albums of all time. The album was inducted into the Grammy Hall of Fame in 2008. It was entered into the National Recording Registry in May 2012.

== Discography ==
Love

- Love (1966)
- Da Capo (1966)
- Forever Changes (1967)
- Four Sail (1969)
- Out Here (1969)
- False Start (1970)
- Reel to Real (1974)
- Studio / Live (1982)
- Arthur Lee and Love (1992)
- The Forever Changes Concert (2003)
- Love Lost (2009, compilation of recordings for unreleased 1971 album)
- Black Beauty (2012, compilation of recordings for unreleased 1973 album)
- Just to Remind You (2025)

Solo

- Vindicator (1972)
- Arthur Lee (1981)
