= Love discography =

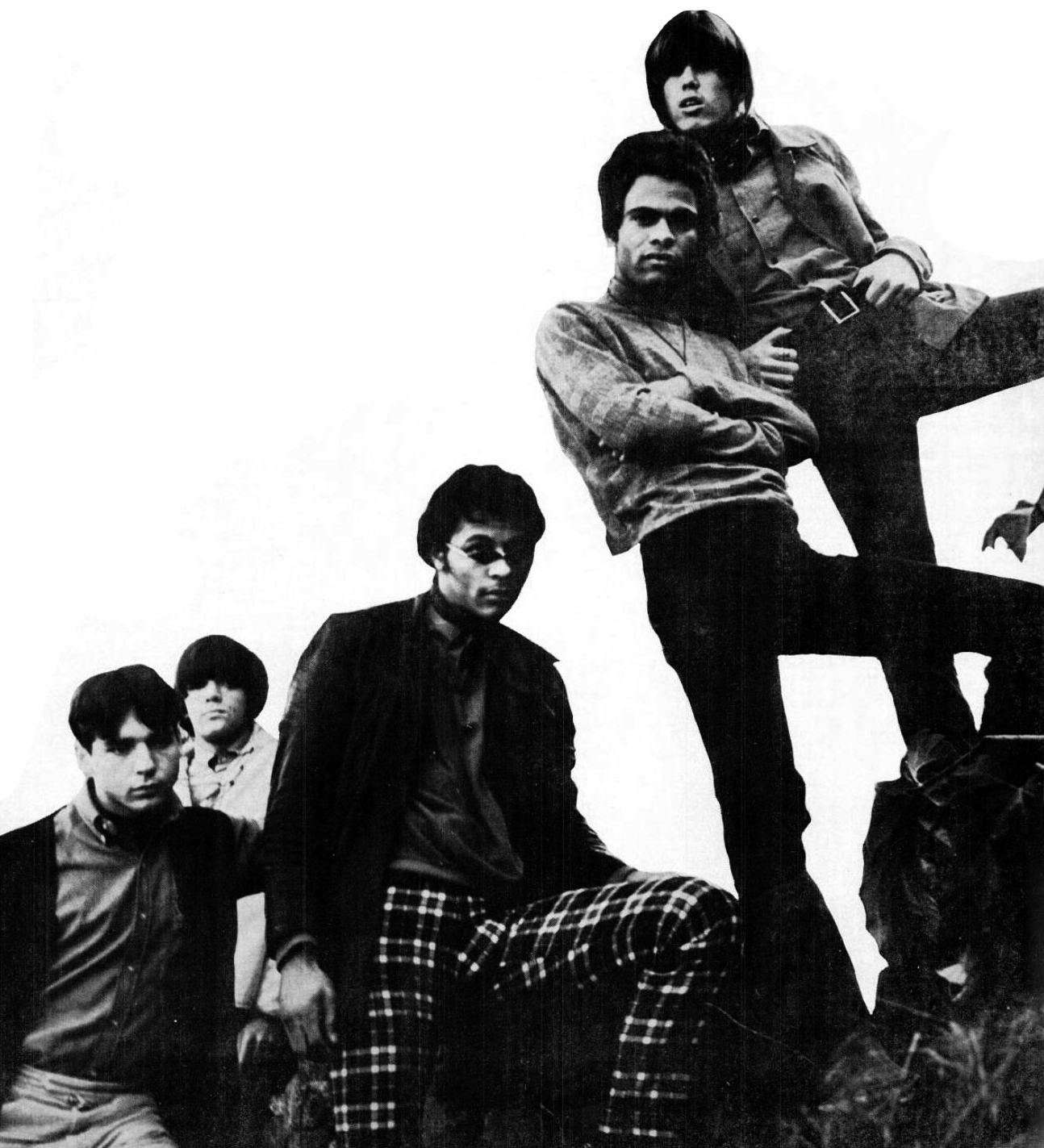
Love in 1966

This is a list of the records issued by American band Love.

== Studio albums ==
Year	Album information	Peak chart positions	
Year	Album information	UK	US
1966	Love: Released: March 1966; Label: Elektra Records; Formats: CD, DL, LP		57
1966	Da Capo: Released: November 1966; Label: Elektra Records; Formats: CD, DL, LP		80
1967	Forever Changes: Released: November 1967; Label: Elektra Records; Formats: CD, DL, CS, LP	24	154
1969	Four Sail: Released: September 1969; Label: Elektra Records; Formats: CD, DL, LP		102
1969	Out Here: Released: December 1969; Label: Blue Thumb /Harvest; Formats: CD, LP	29	176
1970	False Start: Released: December 1970; Label: Blue Thumb; Formats: CD, LP		184
1974	Reel to Real: Released: December 1974; Label: RSO Records, High Moon Records (CD release); Formats: CD, LP		-
1992	Arthur Lee & Love: Released: May 1992, reissued in 2001 as Five String Serenade; Label: New Rose; Formats: CS, CD, LP		
2009	Love Lost: Originally recorded in 1971, previously unreleased; Label: Sundazed (recorded for CBS); Formats: CD, DL, LP		
2012	Black Beauty: Originally recorded in 1973, previously unreleased; Label: High Moon Records; Formats: CD, DL, LP		
2015	Reel to Real (Deluxe): Originally released in 1974. Deluxe edition includes new liner notes, archival photos and bonus tracks.; Label: High Moon Records; Formats: CD, DL, LP		

== Live albums ==
- 1980: Love Live - live, 1978 concert
- 1982: Studio / Live - second side live from a 1970 concert
- 2003: The Forever Changes Concert
- 2003: Electrifically Speaking - Live in Concert
- 2003: Back on the Scene - live at My Place, Santa Monica in 1991
- 2010: Arthur Lee and Love - Live in Paris 1992
- 2015: Coming Through to You: The Live Recording (1970-2004)
- 2017: Complete "Forever Changes" Live

== Compilation albums ==
- 1970: Love Revisited (Elektra)
- 1973: Love Elektra Masters (Elektra)
- 1980: The Best of Love (Rhino, 2003 expanded version on CD)
- 1988: Out There (Ace/Big Beat)
- 1992: Love Comes in Colours (Raven)
- 1995: Love Story 1966–1972 (Rhino)
- 2005: Rhino Hi-Five: Love (Rhino)
- 2006: Love: The Definitive Rock Collection (Elektra/Rhino)
- 2007: The Blue Thumb Recordings (Hip-O Select, Geffen Records)
- 2014: Love Songs: An Anthology of Arthur Lee's Love (Salvo)

== Singles and EPs ==
Date	Title	Peak chart positions		Album
Date	Title	UK	US	Album
March 1966	"My Little Red Book" b/w "A Message to Pretty"	—	52	Love
July 1966	"7 and 7 Is" b/w "No. Fourteen"	—	33	Da Capo
December 1966	"She Comes in Colors" b/w "Orange Skies"	—	—	Da Capo
March 1967	"¡Que Vida!" b/w "Hey Joe"	—	—	Da Capo
January 1968	"Alone Again Or" b/w "A House Is Not a Motel"	58 (Note: Chart position is from the official UK "Breakers List".)	123	Forever Changes
September 1968	"Your Mind and We Belong Together" b/w "Laughing Stock"	—	—	Non-album single
1970	"Alone Again Or" b/w "Good Times"	—	99	
1994	"Girl on Fire" b/w "Midnight Sun"	—	—	
2004	"On Earth Must Be"; Five track EP	—	—	EP, self-released
