= Some Girl =

- Directed by: Rory Kelly
- Written by: Marissa Ribisi; Brie Shaffer
- Produced by: Boaz Davidson; Abra Edelman; Gay Ribisi
- Release date: April 19, 1998
- Running time: 94 minutes
- Country: United States
- Language: English

Some Girl is a 1998 American romantic comedy drama film directed by Rory Kelly and written by actress Marissa Ribisi, who also appeared in the film.

== Premise ==
Claire resents the fact that she has never been in love. She soon falls for somebody but is left heartbroken and disturbed, largely thanks to her emotionally unstable friends.

== Production ==
The film was shot during November 1997 in Los Angeles, California, under the working title of Men.

== Cast ==
- Marissa Ribisi as Claire
- Juliette Lewis as April
- Michael Rapaport as Neal
- Giovanni Ribisi as Jason
- Pamela Adlon as Jenn (credited as Pamela Segall Adlon)
- Trevor Goddard as Ravi
- Kristin Dattilo as Suzanne
- David Gail as Mitchell
- Glenn Quinn as Jeff
- Sharisse Baker-Bernard as Claire's Stepmother (credited as Sharisse Baker)
- John Getz as Claire's Father
- Sam Saletta as Mike
- Jeremy Sisto as Chad
- Kris Iyer as Magazine Stand Clerk
- David Shackelford as Earl
- Mark Valley as Police Officer

== Soundtrack ==
- "Fire, Water, Burn" (Bloodhound Gang)
- "Love is Everywhere" (The Call)
- "Bus" (Longstocking)
- "That Summer Feeling" (Jonathan Richman)
- "Sad, Sad Me" (The Nixions)
- "Shake the Shelter" (Baby Lemonade)
- "Au Fond Du Temple Saint" (The Pearl Fishers)
- "What A Man" (Renee Goldberry)
- "Heads or Tails" (Baby Lemonade)
- "Beautiful Freak" (The Eels)
- "Vampires Suck" (The Godreys)
- "Mercedes" (Joseph Arthur)
- "Squeeze Box Days" (The Murmurs)
- "God Damn" (Chucklehead)
- "She Silenced You" (Giovanni Ribisi, Juliette Lewis)
- "Washed Up And Left For Dead" (The Murmurs)
- "Smart Sexy Hardass" (Jim Goodwin, Rory Kelly, Dave Resnik) vocals Samantha Newark
- "Higher Power" (Jonathan Richman)
