= The Red Telephone =

The Red Telephone may refer to:

- "The Red Telephone" (song), 1967 song by Love
- Moscow–Washington hotline

== See also ==
- Red telephone box
