= David Angel (musician) =

American musician, arranger, composer and teacher (born 1940)

- Born: 1940 (age 84–85); Los Angeles, California, U.S.
- Genres: Jazz
- Instruments: Saxophone
- Education: Los Angeles City College

David Angel (born 1940) is an American musician, arranger, composer, and teacher.

== Early life and education ==
Angel was born and raised in Los Angeles, and began playing the saxophone, clarinet and flute. He performed in jazz and Latin bands during his teens, occasionally playing with older musicians including Kid Ory and Johnny St. Cyr. He attended the Westlake College of Music and Los Angeles City College.

== Career ==
By his early twenties, Angel worked in Hollywood as a performer, composer and arranger, initially after being hired by David Rose. He worked on many popular television series including Bonanza, Lassie, and The Streets of San Francisco, as well as shows starring Jerry Lewis, Red Skelton, and Andy Williams. He also performed in the bands of leading jazz musicians including Woody Herman and Art Pepper and as a session musician, usually in an uncredited capacity as a ghostwriter. He claimed that he was largely uncredited through his own choice, saying: "I preferred it this way. I didn’t have to go to meetings or parties or have to smooze. All I had to do was write music and that is all I wanted." In 1967, at the request of producer Bruce Botnick, he contributed orchestral and horn arrangements to the Los Angeles rock band Love's album Forever Changes, now regarded as a classic of the genre. Angel's orchestral arrangements on the album have been described by Ted Olson, for the Library of Congress, as "arguably the most distinctive sustained orchestration in rock music history".

From the mid-1960s, Angel ran regular rehearsal sessions in Los Angeles, as the David Angel Big Band, but rarely performed in public. Recordings of sessions in 1973 and 1975, not originally intended for release, were eventually issued by VSOP Records in 2015, as Camshafts and Butterflies. Band members included saxophonists Bill Perkins, Bob Cooper and Jackie Kelso; trumpeters Hal Espinoza and Jack Coan, trombonists Bob Enevoldsen, Don Waldrop and Morris Repass, bassist Monty Budwig and drummer Chuck Flores. The liner notes by Scott Yanow describe Angel as "one of the best-known unknown composers and arrangers in jazz today", with a "unique composing and arranging style [that] combines classical techniques with big band jazz arranging in a distinct and individualistic manner".

Angel maintained a career as a music teacher and lecturer, leading classes at Pasadena College, the Dick Grove School of Music, and Los Angeles Valley College. He was approached by the French Ministry of Culture to teach film composition, and then spent 15 years living in Europe. He lectured in Europe at L'Institut Art Culture Perception (IACP) in Paris, and at conservatories in Norway and Russia; and jointly led the composition and arranging department of the Lucerne University of Applied Sciences and Arts in Switzerland.

He returned to live in Los Angeles in the mid-2000s.
