= Reel to Real (album) =

Studio album by Love
- Released: December 1974
- Recorded: 1974
- Studio: Record Plant (Los Angeles)
- Length: 34:05
- Labels: RSO, High Moon
- Producers: Skip Taylor, John Stronach, Arthur Lee

Love chronology
False Start (1970)	Reel to Real (1974)	Out There (1988)

Professional ratings
Review scores
Source	Rating
AllMusic	3.5/5 stars
Christgau's Record Guide	B+
The Encyclopedia of Popular Music	1/5 stars
Exclaim!	5/10

Reel to Real is the seventh and final studio album by the American rock band Love, released in 1974 by RSO Records.

== Background ==
Reel to Real was the first official Love album in four years, following the release of frontman Arthur Lee's solo album Vindicator in 1972 and two different Love albums that had been recorded but unreleased.

Lee recorded the album with studio musicians after dismissing all previous band members. The album featured the same musicians that played on the then-unreleased Black Beauty (2012) and was originally intended as part of a two-album deal with Robert Stigwood's RSO Records. Skip Taylor, a long-time admirer of Lee, approached the label and convinced Stigwood to give the previously commercially unsuccessful Lee the largest advance he would ever receive, followed by the biggest touring opportunity any incarnation of Love would ever embark upon, opening for acts such as Lou Reed and Eric Clapton.

The album was reissued by High Moon Records on CD and digital in 2015 and LP in 2016, with new liner notes, archival photos and bonus tracks. The estate of Arthur Lee released it again on digital in 2026.

All masters excluding the bonus tracks are administered and licensed by the estate of Arthur Lee and the publishing is administered by BMG.

== Critical reception ==
In retrospective reviews, PopDose opined that "A vitally important band – and performer like Arthur Lee – needs to be held in the light for their amazing catalog", and that later albums such as Reel to Real should "not be overlooked". Mark Deming of AllMusic called it "An album with more than its share of great moments." Daniel Sylvester of Exclaim! noted that Lee "comes off sounding nothing short of subdued, toothless and aimless," adding that the record "is lovingly assembled and digitally enhanced, but nonetheless, shouldn't be mistaken for an essential release."

== Track listing ==
All tracks written and arranged by Arthur Lee, except where noted.

Side 1

1. "Time Is Like a River" – 3:08
2. "Stop the Music" – 3:02
3. "Who Are You" – 3:08
4. "Good Old Fashion Dream" – 2:53
5. "Which Witch Is Which?" – 2:03
6. "With a Little Energy" – 2:58

Side 2

1. "Singing Cowboy" (Lee, Jay Donnellan) – 3:09
2. "Be Thankful for What You Got" (William DeVaughn) – 4:33
3. "You Said You Would" – 3:03
4. "Busted Feet" (Lee, Charles Karp) – 2:42
5. "Everybody's Gotta Live" – 3:24

2015 CD bonus tracks

12. "Do It Yourself" (Outtake) – 3:37
13. "I Gotta Remember" (Outtake) – 3:06
14. "Somebody" (Outtake) – 2:43
15. "You Gotta Feel It" (Outtake) – 3:38
16. "With a Little Energy" (Alternate Mix) – 3:11
17. "Busted Feet" (Alternate Mix) (Lee, Karp) – 4:24
18. "You Said You Would" (Single Mix) – 2:26
19. "Stop the Music" (Alternate Take) – 3:38
20. "Graveyard Hop" (Studio Rehearsal) – 1:50
21. "Singing Cowboy" (Alternate Take) (Lee, Donnellan) – 3:50
22. "Everybody's Gotta Live" (Electric Version) – 3:43
23. "Wonder People (I Do Wonder)" (Studio Rehearsal) – 2:27

== Personnel ==
Musicians

- Arthur Lee – vocals, rhythm guitar, harmonica; acoustic guitars (5, 11)
- Joey Blocker – drums
- Sherwood Akuna – bass guitar
- Robert Rozelle – bass guitar (6–7, 10)
- Melvan Whittington – rhythm and lead guitar
- John Sterling – slide and rhythm guitar
- Herman McCormick – congas
- Buzzy Feiten – lead guitar (3)
- Art Fox – acoustic guitars (5)
- Harvey "The Snake" Mandel – electric guitars (5)
- Joey Deaguero – vibes (8)
- Bobby Lyle – keyboards (organ, clavinet, piano)
- Gary Bell – ARP synthesizer
- Venetta Fields – background vocals
- Carlina Williams – background vocals
- Jesse Smith – background vocals
- Clifford Solomon – horns
- John Clauder – horns
- Fred Carter – horns
- Wilber Brown – horns
- Alan DeVille – horns
- Billy Sprague – horns

Technical

- Skip Taylor – producer
- John Stronach – producer, overdubs, mixing
- Arthur Lee – producer, horn arrangements
- Mike Stone – engineer
- Michael Verdick – overdubs, mixing
- Kent Duncan – mastering
- Miles Grayson – horn arrangements
- Ron Durr – cover painting
- Barry Feinstein – photography, layout
