= Ribisi =

Ribisi is an Italian surname. Notable people with the surname include:

- Giovanni Ribisi (born 1974), American actor
- Marissa Ribisi (born 1974), American actress, twin sister of Giovanni
