= Jeannie Piersol =

- Born: Jeannie Gross; United States
- Genres: Rock, psychedelic rock
- Years active: 1960s - ?
- Labels: Cadet Concept, High Moon Records
- Formerly of: Yellow Brick Road, Hair

Jeannie Piersol is a singer who was active in the 1960s. She was part of what is referred to as the San Francisco scene.

== Background ==
Jeannie Piersol was born Jeannie Gross and grew up in Mountain View, California. It was in the Bay area that she met her future husband Bill Piersol at a poetry reading. When she and Bill got married, her maid of honor was Grace Slick. Through Slick she got some of her first musical experience. She later fronted the bands Yellow Brick Road and Hair.

At the time she was known for her musical style which ventured into rock, soul and Indian music.

She has been referred to by Paste as the "Forgotten Rock Goddess of the Bay Area."

Her sister Carol married Darby Slick who is the composer of "Don’t You Want Somebody to Love?", and Jerry Slick's brother.

== Career ==
After fronting the bands Yellow Brick Road and Hair, she managed to get a solo deal with Cadet Concept, a record label that was the subsidiary of Chess Records.

In 1968, she cut the single "Gladys"/"With Your Love", which was released on Cadet Concept 7003. According to Far Out, the drummer on the session was Maurice White, who later was with Earth, Wind & Fire. The single was a Cash Box Best Bets single for the week of 18 May. Taking note of the pulsating backing rhythm, and calling the song a love/flower ode, the reviewer stated the single would do well in airplay and sales. The record didn't catch on at the time.

She recorded the single "The Nest", which was released in 1969.

In early February 2025, High Moon Records issued her album The Nest.
