= Out There (Love album) =

Compilation album by Love
- Released: 1988
- Recorded: September–October 1968 (Out Here); March 17, June–July 1970 (False Start)
- Studio: A makeshift studio in a rented warehouse, Hollywood (Out Here); Olympic, London (False Start); Record Plant, Los Angeles (False Start)
- Genre: Psychedelic rock, blues rock
- Length: 60:09
- Label: Big Beat
- Producer: Arthur Lee

Love chronology
Reel to Real (1975)	Out There (1988)	Arthur Lee & Love (1993)

Professional ratings
Review scores
Source	Rating
AllMusic	3.5/5 stars
The Encyclopedia of Popular Music	3/5 stars
Select	4/5 medals

Out There is a compilation album by the American rock band Love, released in 1988 on Big Beat Records. It consists of tracks from their 1969 double LP Out Here and their 1970 LP False Start.

== Track listing ==
All songs were written by Arthur Lee, unless otherwise noted.

Side one

1. "I'll Pray for You" – 4:15
2. "Love Is Coming" – 1:22
3. "Signed D. C." – 5:15
4. "I Still Wonder" (Lee, Jay Donnellan) – 3:06
5. "Listen to My Song" – 2:21
6. "Doggone" – 3:14
7. "Nice to Be" – 2:46

Side two

1. "Stand Out" – 3:00
2. "The Everlasting First" (Lee, Jimi Hendrix) – 3:02
3. "Gimi a Little Break" – 1:59
4. "Willow Willow" – 3:20
5. "You Are Something" – 2:03
6. "Love Is More Than Words or Better Late Than Never" – 2:29
7. "Gather 'Round" – 4:50
- Tracks 1, 3–8, 11–14 from Out Here (1969)
- Tracks 2, 9–10 from False Start (1970)

== Personnel ==
Credits adapted from LP liner notes of Out Here and False Start, unless otherwise indicated.

Love

- Arthur Lee – lead vocals, rhythm guitar; piano (2, 9–10)
- Jay Donnellan – lead guitar (1, 3–8, 11–12, 14)
- Frank Fayad – bass guitar; backing vocals (1, 3–8, 11–14)
- George Suranovich – drums (1, 4–8, 11–14); backing vocals (1, 3–8, 11–14)
- Gary Rowles – lead guitar (2, 9–10, 13)

Additional musicians

- Drachen Theaker – drums (3)
- Jim Hobson – piano (1)
- Nooney Rickett – rhythm guitar (2, 10), backing vocals (2, 10)
- Jimi Hendrix – lead guitar (9)

Technical

- Brian Hogg – compiler, photographs
- Phil Smee – sleeve design
- Pete Frame – photographs
- Adam Skeaping – post production
- Arthur Lee – producer, arranger; engineer (1, 3–8, 11–14)
- Jay Donnellan – arranger (4)
- Jimi Hendrix – arranger (9)
- George Gaal – engineer (1, 3–8, 11–14)
- Gary Kellgren – engineer (2, 9–10)
