= Everybody's Gotta Live =

Song written by Arthur Lee

Single by Arthur Lee

from the album Vindicator
- B-side: "Love Jumped Through My Window"
- Released: June 1, 1972
- Genre: Psychedelic rock; rock and roll
- Length: 3:31
- Label: A&M
- Songwriter: Arthur Lee
- Producers: Arthur Lee; Allan McDougall

"Everybody's Gotta Live" is a song written by the American musician Arthur Lee. It was performed by Lee and released as a single in June 1972, coupled with the track "Love Jumped Through My Window"; both tracks also appeared that year on Lee's album Vindicator.

"Everybody's Gotta Live" was later re-recorded and released on the 1974 album Reel to Real by the rock band Love, a group in which Lee served as frontman.

A cover version by rapper Mac Miller, simply titled "Everybody", was released on Miller's posthumous 2020 album Circles.

== Release ==
"Everybody's Gotta Live" was written, performed and recorded by Lee, and released in June 1972 as a 45 rpm disc single, with "Love Jumped Through My Window" as its B-side. Both tracks were also released that year on Lee's album Vindicator. In 1974, a re-recording of "Everybody's Gotta Live" appeared on the album Reel to Real by Love.

== Reception ==
From the A Pessimist Is Never Disappointed site: "An acoustic shuffle that builds in intensity, the cut is surely one of the finest things that Lee ever wrote and the kind of song that warrants purchasing this album if you were even a bit on the fence about it. Direct, poetic, and communal in the best possible way, the cut is positively invigorating."

== In popular culture ==
The version of the song by Love was featured in the 2019 film Jojo Rabbit.

The version of the song by Love was featured in the 2021 television series The Great, season 2, episode 9.

The version of the song by Love was featured in the 2024 television series A Man on the Inside, season 1, episode 4.

The version of the song by Love was featured in the 2026 television series Black Doves, season 2, episode 1
