= The First Family: Live at Winchester Cathedral 1967 =

Live album by Sly and the Family Stone
- Released: April 12, 2025
- Recorded: March 26, 1967
- Venue: Winchester Cathedral, Redwood City, CA
- Length: 48:41
- Label: High Moon Records
- Producer: Alec Palao, Edwin Konings, Arno Konings

The First Family: Live at Winchester Cathedral 1967 is an album containing an historic early live recording by Sly & the Family Stone. It was released in 2025.

== Background ==
Sly & the Family Stone was the resident band at the Winchester Cathedral club in Redwood City, California, from 16 December 1966 to 28 April 1967. The performance on the album, a mix of contemporary soul and R&B covers along with one original composition, occurred in the early hours of 26 March.

The recording was made by the group's first manager, Rich Romanello, who was also the owner of Winchester Cathedral. This was before Sly & the Family Stone signed with Epic Records in 1967, so after he lost control of the act, Romanello put the tapes aside.

In 2002, Dutch collectors Edwin and Arno Konings learned of the Winchester Cathedral recordings when visiting Romanello, after which archivist and reissue producer Alec Palao examined the tapes. At this stage, despite the obviously superlative performance, they were not deemed worthy of release due to some sonic flaws. However, Romanello expressed a desire for the music to be heard and made arrangements with the Konings. Further restorative work by Palao brought the recordings to a releasable standard for The First Family.

The package was produced by Palao and the Konings for High Moon Records, initially as a deluxe Record Store Day pressing with gatefold cover, clear vinyl, and 24-page booklet with notes by Palao. The record was one of the Record Store Day releases mentioned on 7 February 2025 by The Music as scheduled for Saturday, 12 April.

A regular single sleeve, black vinyl edition was announced for release on 18 July, along with a CD edition that included an extra track, "Try a Little Tenderness".

Several songs from The First Family were featured in the documentary Sly Lives! (aka The Burden of Black Genius).

== Reception ==
The review at Tinnitist said the album had intoxicating energy and was a fascinating recording as it "explicates Sly Stone’s genius on a tremendously exciting and atmospheric set of vintage soul covers". The article further called the album an historic document that was required listening.

Music collector magazine Goldmine mentioned the quality of the packaging, the clear vinyl, and the 24-page booklet, adding that acquiring a copy should be “an absolute no brainer”.

Guitar Player magazine said, "The First Family: Live at the Winchester Cathedral is an incredible early document of Sly and the Family Stone just a few weeks after formation and doing their first residency, which led directly to signing with Epic Records. Talk about a big bang moment!" The review added, "The earliest live Sly and the Family Stone recordings are among the treasures from San Francisco's Summer of Love era rediscovered and released by High Moon Records."

Album notes writer Alec Palao was nominated for a Grammy Award in the Best Album Notes category for the 68th Grammy Awards.

== Track listing ==
- A1. "I Ain't Got Nobody" (Sylvester Stewart)
- A2. "Skate Now" (Louis Pegues, Robert Bateman)
- A3. "Show Me" (Joe Tex)
- A4."What Is Soul?" (Ben E. King, Bob Gallo)
- A5. "I Can't Turn You Loose" (Otis Redding)
- B1. "Baby I Need Your Loving" (Holland-Dozier-Holland)
- B2. "Pucker Up Buttercup" (Danny Coggins, Harvey Fuqua, Johnny Bristol)
- B3. "Saint James Infirmary" (Traditional)
- B4. "I Gotta Go Now (Up on the Floor) - Funky Broadway (Arlester Christian, C. Dunn, P. Holman, Rex Garvin)

== Personnel ==
=== Musicians ===
- Larry Graham - bass, vocals
- Sly Stone - guitar, harmonica, vocals, organ
- Brother Freddie Stone - guitar, trombone, trumpet, vocals
- Greg Errico - percussion
- Jerry Martini - saxophone, tambourine
- Cynthia Robinson - trumpet, vocals
