= Chucklehead =

American funk band

- Origin: Boston, Massachusetts, United States
- Genres: Funk
- Years active: 1988–97, 2013–present
- Labels: EnuffaMyButt, Summit Records, Wonder Drug Records
- Members: Brian Gottesman; Huck Bennert; Meyer Statham; Eben Levy; Mick Demopolous; Erik Attkisson
- Past members: Burke Mamlin; Dave Rengel; John Schachter; Lenny Alkins; Robert Nahf III; Paul Labay
- Website: chucklehead.com

Chucklehead is an American funk band from Boston, Massachusetts. Formed in 1988, the band reached the height of their popularity in the mid-1990s through constant touring and their lavish theme-based live shows. Chucklehead disbanded in 1997 following the release of their final album Belly Up. After a 17-year hiatus the band reunited in 2013 for several performances.

== History ==
=== Formation and move to Boston (1988–89) ===
Chucklehead was formed in 1988 at Wesleyan University in Middletown, Connecticut. Founding members include Eben Levy (guitar, vocals), Erik Atkisson (drums, vocals), Brian Gottesman (keyboards, vocals) and Burke Mamlin (bass, vocals). While at Wesleyan, the group recorded a 4-song demo, produced and engineered by Huck Bennert, a fellow Wesleyan student who would go on to produce most of the band's future recordings.

Huck joined the band as tenor and baritone saxophonist, percussionist, and vocalist shortly after the recording. In 1989, the band added additional Wesleyan students Lennie Alkins (tenor sax, vocals), Rob Nahf (alto sax, vocals), and Paul Labay (trumpet). In 1989, the seniors in the group graduated and the entire band, except Mamlin and Labay, moved to Boston. Alkins and Gottesman stayed at Wesleyan, but commuted to Boston to write, record, and play shows in 1990. In Boston, the band was quickly fleshed out with Dave Rengel on bass and John Shachter on trumpet and vocals.

=== The early years (1990–92) ===
This 8-person incarnation of the band would go on to record the group's debut album Big Wet Kiss in 1992 and started a tradition of playing lavish theme-based shows like the Winter Wonderland and the Funk-Aquatic Convention, often involving sets and costumes. The band became an underground indie hit and was celebrated in publications like The Village Voice and a young Source Magazine for its groundbreaking mix of hip hop and live funk. The band served as an escapist, irreverent, and acerbic counterweight to the grunge music at the top of the Billboard charts at the time.

With the release of Big Wet Kiss, the band was featured on the MTV program Like We Care and started a heavy schedule of touring in the US, a schedule that never let up until the group played their final show in 1997.

=== Lineup changes (1993–94) ===
In late 1993, Shachter and Nahf left the band. In 1994, while recording the band's second album Fuzz (at One World recording in Boston and Chun King in New York), Rengel and Alkins left the band. They were replaced by Mick Demopolous on bass and Meyer Statham on vocals and trombone. This new 6-person lineup would finish the recording of Fuzz (1994) and hit the road in support of the album. The new, leaner lineup deepened their focus on more raw, hard funk and continued to find new ways to fuse it with live hip hop. The band also continued its tradition of over-the-top themed shows, with tours like the Jungle Function. Songs from Fuzz were featured in the 1994 film Sleep with Me and in the 2000 film Love & Sex.

=== Breakup (1997) ===
In 1997, after 8 years on the road, playing over 125 shows a year, the band released their third album Belly Up and played their final show at Mama Kin Music Hall in Boston, MA. The track "God Damn" was featured in the 1998 film Some Girl.

=== Hiatus (1998–2013) ===
During their hiatus, the band and dedicated fans worked on compiling and archiving live recordings and videos. The resulting 100+ live shows on Archive.org have been downloaded over 400,000 times.

=== Return (2013–Present) ===
In the summer of 2013, seventeen years after the group's final 1997 sold-out show at Mama Kin in Boston MA, the band got back together and started performing again. In July 2013, the band played The Middle East in Cambridge MA, one of the old haunts from their '90s run. For the first time in the group's history, all 10 members from the Boston years appeared on stage together. The band has announced that there will be more live shows in 2014.

== Discography ==
- Big Wet Kiss (1992)
- Fuzz (1994)
- Belly Up (1997)

== Members ==
=== Current members ===
- Brian Gottesman – vocals and keyboard
- Huck Bennert – vocals, baritone sax, and percussion
- Meyer Statham – vocals and trombone
- Eben "Eb-Tide" Levy – guitar
- Mick Demopolous – bass
- Erik "Erock" Attkisson – drums

=== Former members ===
- John "Scooter" Schachter – vocals and trumpet
- Burke Mamlin – bass, vocals
- Dave Rengel – bass
- Lenny "Len E Len the Pirate King" Alkins – tenor sax
- Robert "Biscuits" Nahf III – alto sax
- Paul Labay – trumpet
