= Sleep with Me =

- Theatrical release poster
- Directed by: Rory Kelly
- Written by: Duane Dell'Amico; Roger Hedden; Neal Jimenez; Joe Keenan; Rory Kelly; Michael Steinberg
- Produced by: Michael Steinberg, Eric Stoltz, Roger Hedden
- Starring: Craig Sheffer; Eric Stoltz; Meg Tilly; Dean Cameron; Todd Field; Thomas Gibson; Parker Posey; Adrienne Shelly; Susan Traylor; Tegan West; June Lockhart
- Cinematography: Andrzej Sekuła
- Edited by: David Moritz
- Music by: David Nessim Lawrence
- Production companies: August Entertainment; Castleberg Production; Paribas Film Corporation; United Artists
- Distributed by: MGM/UA Distribution Co.
- Release date: September 23, 1994
- Running time: 86 minutes
- Country: United States
- Language: English
- Box office: $0.2 million (US/Canada)

Sleep with Me is a 1994 American comedy-drama film directed by Rory Kelly and starring Meg Tilly, Eric Stoltz and Craig Sheffer, who play good friends who become involved in a love triangle, a relationship complicated by the marriage of Tilly's and Stoltz's characters.

It also features Parker Posey, Joey Lauren Adams, and a cameo by Quentin Tarantino, in which he expounds on the homoerotic subtext of Top Gun to Todd Field. Six different writers wrote a scene each about the arc and development of the relation between the protagonists, including Kelly.

The film was screened in the Un Certain Regard section at the 1994 Cannes Film Festival. The film was a Gala Presentation at the 1994 Toronto International Film Festival.

== Cast ==
- Meg Tilly as Sarah
- Eric Stoltz as Joseph
- Craig Sheffer as Frank
- Lewis Arquette as Minister
- Todd Field as Duane
- Adrienne Shelly as Pamela
- Susan Traylor as Deborah
- Tegan West as Rory
- Dean Cameron as Leo
- Amaryllis Borrego as Amy
- Thomas Gibson as Nigel
- Parker Posey as Athena
- Joey Lauren Adams as Lauren
- Alida P. Field as Gina
- Vanessa Angel as Marianne
- June Lockhart as Caroline
- Quentin Tarantino as Sid
- Alexandra Hedison as Brunette Actress

== Reception ==
The film received mostly negative reviews. On Rotten Tomatoes it has a 21% rating, based on 14 reviews.

Despite playing to standing ovations at the 1994 Cannes Film Festival and being surrounded by a great deal of early buzz, the film suffered from distribution issues—namely, that it was acquired by a reorganized MGM and not a specialty division. Consequently, it made no more festival appearances, was marketed by MGM as a mainstream romp, and was ignored by most top critics. One of the exceptions was Roger Ebert for the Chicago Sun-Times, who wrote

Sleep with Me is the kind of movie anyone is likely to drift into. The writer-director Quentin Tarantino turns up, for example, as a guest at a party, and launches into a long, detailed, manic explanation of why Top Gun is really 'the story of a man's struggle against his own homosexuality.' The more he talks, the more plausible his theory sounds. The movie ends kind of abruptly. Maybe all six writers wrote for the beginning and the middle, and no one thought to close the story. What we're left with are bits and pieces, some of them inspired, in a movie that kind of works sometimes, if you approach it in the right mood. The odd thing is, the offhandedness is seductive.

It opened on six screens in the United States on September 23, 1994, and grossed $33,004 in its opening weekend and went on to gross $200,151.

== Year-end lists ==
- Honorable mention – David Elliott, The San Diego Union-Tribune

== Soundtrack ==
- "Wasted" (Pere Ubu)
- "Howl" (Syd Straw)
- "E Rockin 'It" (Chucklehead)
- "Funk Is on the Loose" (Chucklehead)
- "Ab Traffic Jam" (Chucklehead)
- "I Live in a Nice House" (Thelonious Monster)
- "Big Dumb Song" (Chucklehead)
- "Shaken" (Crossed Wire)
- "I'm Yours" (Crossed Wire)
- "Retrosexy" (Chucklehead)
- "Maybe You Should Change Your Name" (El Caminos)
- "Tune In, Turn On, Drop Out" (El Caminos)
- "I Miss You" (Joey Lauren Adams)
- "Daddy's Dead in Momma's Head" (Joey Lauren Adams & Parker Posey)
- "Nocturne No. 2, Op. 9, in E-Flat Major" (Peter Schmalfuss)

(Sourced from IMDb)
