= Black Beauty (album) =

Studio album by Love
- Released: February 12, 2012
- Recorded: Spring–winter 1973
- Studios: Valentine's (North Hollywood); Paramount Recording (Hollywood); Wally Heider (Hollywood)
- Genres: Funk rock; hard rock; psychedelic rock
- Length: 43:38
- Label: High Moon
- Producers: Paul Rothchild, Arthur Lee

Love chronology
Love Lost (2009)	Black Beauty (2012)

Black Beauty is an album by the psychedelic rock band Love, released on February 13, 2012, nearly six years after the death of frontman Arthur Lee. Issued on High Moon Records, it compiles material from a canceled studio album, which Lee—backed by a new group with an all-black line-up—planned to have released on the Buffalo Records label. Recorded after a series of unsuccessful albums, both with Love and his 1972 solo effort Vindicator, Black Beauty was intended to serve as Lee's comeback album. Among other Love releases, it is notable for its reinvention of the band as a funk group, while preserving Lee's lyrical complexity.

Some of the tracks for the canceled album had appeared beforehand on compilation albums such as Reel to Real and Love Lost; however, Black Beauty is the first release to assemble all the compositions from the 1973 recording sessions. While the album does not represent the classic Love line-up, music critics have recognized it as the best representation of Lee's hard rock period.

== Background ==
In July 1968, eight months after Love's third album Forever Changes, frontman Arthur Lee disbanded the original line-up, before regrouping with a completely new troupe of musicians. Recording three additional albums with Love, Lee found limited success and was on the verge of obscurity. Influenced by his recording sessions with Jimi Hendrix in April 1970, after concluding a European tour in England, Lee forsook his folk rock roots in favor of a hard rock approach. In 1972, he released his first solo effort Vindicator, the first Lee album composed in the newly adapted style, but, again, it did not fare well with music critics and buyers. Despite Lee's self-doubt and unwillingness to tour, he decided to persevere with another line-up; while Love had always been a racially integrated group, Lee told drummer Joe Blocker, "I want an all-black band. I want some cats that can play funky and rock". To fulfill his aspirations, Lee recruited Blocker, Melvan Whittington (lead guitar), and Robert Rozelle (bass guitar).

== Recording ==
With record producer Paul Rothchild, best known for his work with the Doors, at the helm, Love recorded throughout mid-1973. Writing for the AllMusic website, Mark Deming described the group's sound, saying the material generally had a "stronger R&B undertow along with Hendrix-influenced songs and guitar work ('Midnight Sun' sounds like something Jimi could have written, and Whittington's soloing captures the mood of Hendrix's playing without lifting his licks)". Deming also accounts for "some moodier numbers like 'Skid' and 'See Myself in You'". On tracks "Can't Find It" and "Walk Right In", however, the band is reminiscent of the hushed ballads arranged in Forever Changes.

Intended to be released on Buffalo Records, a small indie label founded by Hair producer Michael Butler, the company went bankrupt before Black Beauty could be distributed. Songs from the recording sessions did however appear on Reel to Real in 1974. In 2009, Sundazed Music released Love Lost, an album with two songs that later were featured on Black Beauty, including "Midnight Sun" and "Can't Find It". As years progressed, poor-quality releases of the Black Beauty sessions arose, motivating Lee to push for an official release up until his death in 2006.

== Release ==
Overseen by Lee's widow Diana and record producer George Baer Wallace, High Moon Records remastered original acetates of the Black Beauty sessions that were recovered and released them on a limited 5,000-copy vinyl pressing on February 13, 2012. The cover features a portrait of Lee designed by Herbert Worthington, cover photographer of Fleetwood Mac's Rumours, and each copy of the album was individually numbered and included an extensive 28-page booklet written by rock critic Ben Edmonds. In 2014, High Moon reissued Black Beauty on CD. The expanded 62-page booklet contains discussions with former band members, rare photos from the 1973 recording sessions and six bonus tracks: the title-song of the film Thomasine & Bushrod, a 22-minute interview with Lee in 1974, three live performances from 1974, and Arthur Lee and Ventilator's song "L.A. Blues".

== Reception ==
Stephen M. Deusner of Pitchfork opined that the Love line-up on Black Beauty "sounds perfectly rough and unrehearsed, generating a tense energy", while also noting that "Lee sounds engaged and invigorated, forgoing the bitterness that had rankled the band for a slightly more hopeful outlook". In a review for Record Collector, Jason Draper felt that Black Beauty "picked up on Hendrix's late-period R&B" and praised the 1974 interview for being "perhaps the fullest picture we'll ever have of this once-lost chapter in Lee's red book". David Fricke of Rolling Stone posited that "Black Beauty might have been received as a strong comeback for Lee, a turn to steamy R&B with heavy-guitar punch — if it had come out".

Michael Fiander of PopMatters felt that, while the album "may have a totally different sonic palate than Forever Changes or Da Capo", it still highlighted "Lee's emotionally revealing lyrics and careful pop sensibilities". Reviewing the deluxe reissue of the album, Rob Ross proclaimed Black Beauty "the great lost Love album", praising the cohesive effort of the group and the quality of the production, "considering the only source originally known was from acetates". Writing for Uncut, Luke Thorn recounted the album's troubled beginning before stating, "Black Beauty was intended to be a culmination, the crowning achievement of Lee's new direction".

== Track listing ==
All songs written by Arthur Lee, except where noted.

Side one

1. "Young and Able (Good and Evil)" – 3:24
2. "Midnight Sun" – 3:33
3. "Can't Find It" – 3:46
4. "Walk Right In" (Gus Cannon) – 3:23
5. "Skid" (Angela Rackley, Riley Racer) – 2:52

Side two

1. "Beep Beep" – 2:14
2. "Stay Away" – 2:47
3. "Lonely Pigs" – 4:25
4. "See Myself in You" – 3:03
5. "Product of the Times" – 4:11

CD bonus tracks

11. "(Title Song From the Motion Picture) Thomasine & Bushrod" – 2:26
12. "Arthur Lee Interview" (Steven Rosen, 1974) – 22:16
13. "Every Time I Look Up, I'm Down" (Live, Electric Gardens, Glasgow, Scotland, 5/30/1974) – 3:32
14. "Nothing" (Live, Electric Gardens, Glasgow, Scotland, 5/30/1974) – 3:06
15. "Keep On Shining" (Live, Electric Gardens, Glasgow, Scotland, 5/30/1974) – 5:56
16. "L.A. Blues" (Tom T. Hall) (Performed by Arthur Lee and Ventilator) – 3:02

== Personnel ==
Love

- Arthur Lee – guitar, vocals, harpsichord
- Melvan Whittington – guitar (1–9, 13–15), harpsichord (1–9)
- Robert Rozelle – bass guitar (1–9, 13–15)
- Joe Blocker – drums, percussion, vocals (1–9, 13–15)

Additional musicians

- Riley Racer – dobro (5)
- Carl McKnight – steel drums (6)
- Don Poncher – drums (10)
- Craig Tarwater – guitar (10)
- Frank Fayad – bass guitar (10)
- John Sterling – guitar (13–15)
- Matt Devine – guitar, bass guitar (16)
- Byron Reynolds – drums (16)

Technical

- Arthur Lee – producer
- Michael Butler – executive producer
- Raghu Ghadoke – engineer
- Melvan Whittington III – partial arrangement (6)
- Matt Devine – producer, engineer, mixing (16)
- Tom Erbe – mixing (16)
