= Laurie Styvers =

American singer

- Born: Laurette Stivers; 3 August 1951; Texas, United States
- Died: February 18, 1998 (aged 46) Texas, United States
- Occupations: Singer, songwriter
- Years active: 1970–1973

Laurette Stivers, known as Laurie Styvers, was a British-based, American singer-songwriter.

== Career ==
=== Justine ===
Styvers moved to London in the mid-1960s when her father, who was a pipeline engineer in the oil industry, was stationed in Europe. She attended The American School in London, graduating in 1969. The year prior, Styvers had responded to an advertisement for female singers that had been placed by John McBurnie (later of Jackson Heights) and Keith Trowsdale. The three, with additional vocalists Bethlyn Bates and Valerie Cope, formed the psychedelic folk band Justine and recorded and released one album and two singles with producer Hugh Murphy in 1970. Styvers left to attend college in Colorado before the album was released and thus was not pictured on its cover. She returned to the UK in late 1970 and rejoined the group but they disbanded shortly thereafter.

=== Solo ===
Styvers signed to Hush Productions, owned by Hugh Murphy and Shel Talmy, and released two solo albums and a single between 1971 and 1973. These were produced by Murphy, who was also the co-writer on a handful of songs, as well as being Styvers' sometime boyfriend. Her debut was Spilt Milk, recorded in the spring of 1971 with arrangements by Tom Parker. Released in the United States by Warner Brothers in November 1971, it received good reviews and some airplay on the college circuit but was not commercially successful. In 1981, Christgau's Record Guide: Rock Albums of the Seventies described the first solo album as "rightfully obscure".

Styvers performed at the Troubadour in Los Angeles in support of the album, but then returned to her studies at the University of Colorado where she joined a local group, Little Brown's Electric Band. Spilt Milk was issued in the UK in May 1972 on the Chrysalis label and a concurrent single, "Beat The Reaper", got healthy airplay, including a feature as BBC Radio 1 Single of the Week. Styvers was summoned back to London to promote the album and also start work on its sequel, The Colorado Kid, which was recorded over the early summer with David Whitaker handling the arrangements and the ex-Arrival trio of Dyan Birch, Frank Collins, and Paddy McHugh on backing vocals. The Colorado Kid appeared in the spring of the following year to further good reviews, although it was not released in the United States.

On February 17, 2023, High Moon Records released Gemini Girl: The Complete Hush Recordings, a compilation of material from Styvers' Hush studio sessions. The release includes the entirety of the Spilt Milk and The Colorado Kid LPs, as well as alternate mixes, outtakes, demos, and a 48-page booklet illustrated with photos and memorabilia. In 2024, High Moon released additional tracks on an LP, Let Me Comfort You: The Hush Rarities.

== Later life and death ==
Following the release of her second album, Styvers returned to Colorado and continued to dabble in music until the late 1970s. She shifted her focus however to caring for animals. Later on, she returned to her native Texas and established an animal sanctuary with her father, the Creature Comforts Boarding Kennel. She died from hepatitis in 1998.

== Discography ==
=== Justine ===
Album

- Justine (1970), Uni Records UNLS 111

Singles

- "Leave Me Be" (1969), Dot Records, Dot 121
- "She Brings The Morning With Her" (1970), Uni Records, UNS 528

=== Solo ===
Albums

- Spilt Milk (1972), Warner Brothers WS1946 (US) / Chrysalis Records CHR 1007 (UK)
- The Colorado Kid (1973), Chrysalis Records CHR 1038

Single

- "Beat The Reaper" (1972), Chrysalis Records CYK 4796

Compilations

- Gemini Girl: The Complete Hush Recordings (2023) High Moon Records HMRCD 014
- Let Me Comfort You: The Hush Rarities (2024), High Moon Records
