= False Start (album) =

Studio album by Love
- Released: December 1970
- Recorded: February 27, March 17 and June–July, 1970
- Venue: Waltham Forest Tech College (London)
- Studio: Olympic (London); Record Plant (Los Angeles)
- Genre: Psychedelic rock, folk rock, rhythm and blues
- Length: 31:54
- Label: Blue Thumb (USA); Harvest (UK)
- Producer: Arthur Lee

Love chronology
Out Here (1969)	False Start (1970)	Reel to Real (1974)

Professional ratings
Review scores
Source	Rating
AllMusic	3.5/5 stars
Christgau's Record Guide	A−
The Encyclopedia of Popular Music	1/5 stars

False Start is the sixth studio album by the American rock band Love, released in December 1970 by Blue Thumb Records.

== Background ==
The second and final Love album for Blue Thumb Records saw bandleader Arthur Lee heavily influenced by his friend, Jimi Hendrix, with Hendrix appearing on the opening track, "The Everlasting First", one of several tracks that Hendrix recorded with Love during a session at Olympic Studios in London on March 17, 1970. The remaining studio tracks were recorded in June and July of that year at the Record Plant in Los Angeles, while "Stand Out", a song from the band's previous album Out Here (1969), was included on False Start in a live rendition recorded on February 27 at Waltham Forest Tech College in London.

Three selections were later added to the 1988 Love compilation album Out There. In May 2007, False Start was reissued by Hip-O Select as part of The Blue Thumb Recordings.

== Track listing ==
All tracks written and arranged by Arthur Lee, except "The Everlasting First", written and arranged by Lee and Jimi Hendrix.

Side one

1. "The Everlasting First" – 3:01
2. "Flying" – 2:37
3. "Gimi a Little Break" – 2:10
4. "Stand Out" (live) – 3:35
5. "Keep On Shining" – 3:50

Side two

1. "Anytime" – 3:23
2. "Slick Dick" – 3:05
3. "Love Is Coming" – 1:24
4. "Feel Daddy Feel Good" – 3:15
5. "Ride That Vibration" – 3:34

== Personnel ==
Credits adapted from LP liner notes.

Love

- Arthur Lee – lead vocals, rhythm guitar, piano
- Gary Rowles – lead guitar, backing vocals
- Frank Fayad – bass guitar. backing vocals
- George Suranovich – drums. backing vocals

Additional musicians

- Jimi Hendrix – lead guitar (1)
- Nooney Rickett – rhythm guitar (2–10), backing vocals (2–3, 5–6, 8–10)

Technical

- Arthur Lee – producer, arranger
- Jimi Hendrix – arranger (1)
- Gary Kellgren – engineer
- Ross Shifman – photos
- Camouflage Productions – design
