= Forever Changes =

Studio album by Love
- Released: November 1, 1967
- Recorded: June 9 – September 25, 1967
- Studios: Sunset Sound, Hollywood
- Genres: Folk rock; orchestral pop; psychedelia; baroque pop; chamber pop
- Length: 42:59
- Label: Elektra
- Producers: Arthur Lee; Bruce Botnick

Love chronology
Da Capo (1966)	Forever Changes (1967)	Four Sail (1969)

Singles from Forever Changes
- 1. "Alone Again Or" / "A House Is Not a Motel" Released: January 1968; 2. "The Daily Planet" / "Andmoreagain" Released: March 1968; 3. "Your Mind and We Belong Together" / "Laughing Stock" Released: September 1968

Forever Changes is the third studio album by the American rock band Love, released in November 1967 by Elektra Records. The album saw the group embrace a subtler folk-influenced sound based around acoustic guitars and orchestral arrangements, while primary songwriter Arthur Lee explored darker themes alluding to mortality and his growing disillusionment with the era's counterculture. It was the final album recorded by the original band lineup; after its completion, guitarist Bryan MacLean left the group acrimoniously, and Lee subsequently dismissed the other members.

Forever Changes had only moderate success on the album charts upon release, peaking at No. 154 in the US and No. 24 in the UK. In subsequent years, it has become recognized as an influential document of 1960s psychedelia and named among the greatest albums of all time by a variety of publications.

== Background ==
For Da Capo, Love's second studio album, the band expanded from five members to seven in order to take on a more jazz-influenced style. Shortly after the album's release, however, bandleader Arthur Lee decided the experiment had run its course and fired drummer-turned-keyboardist Alban "Snoopy" Pfisterer and saxophonist and flautist Tjay Cantrelli. This left a lineup of Lee (lead vocals), Bryan MacLean (rhythm guitar), Johnny Echols (lead guitar), Ken Forssi (bass), and Michael Stuart (drums).

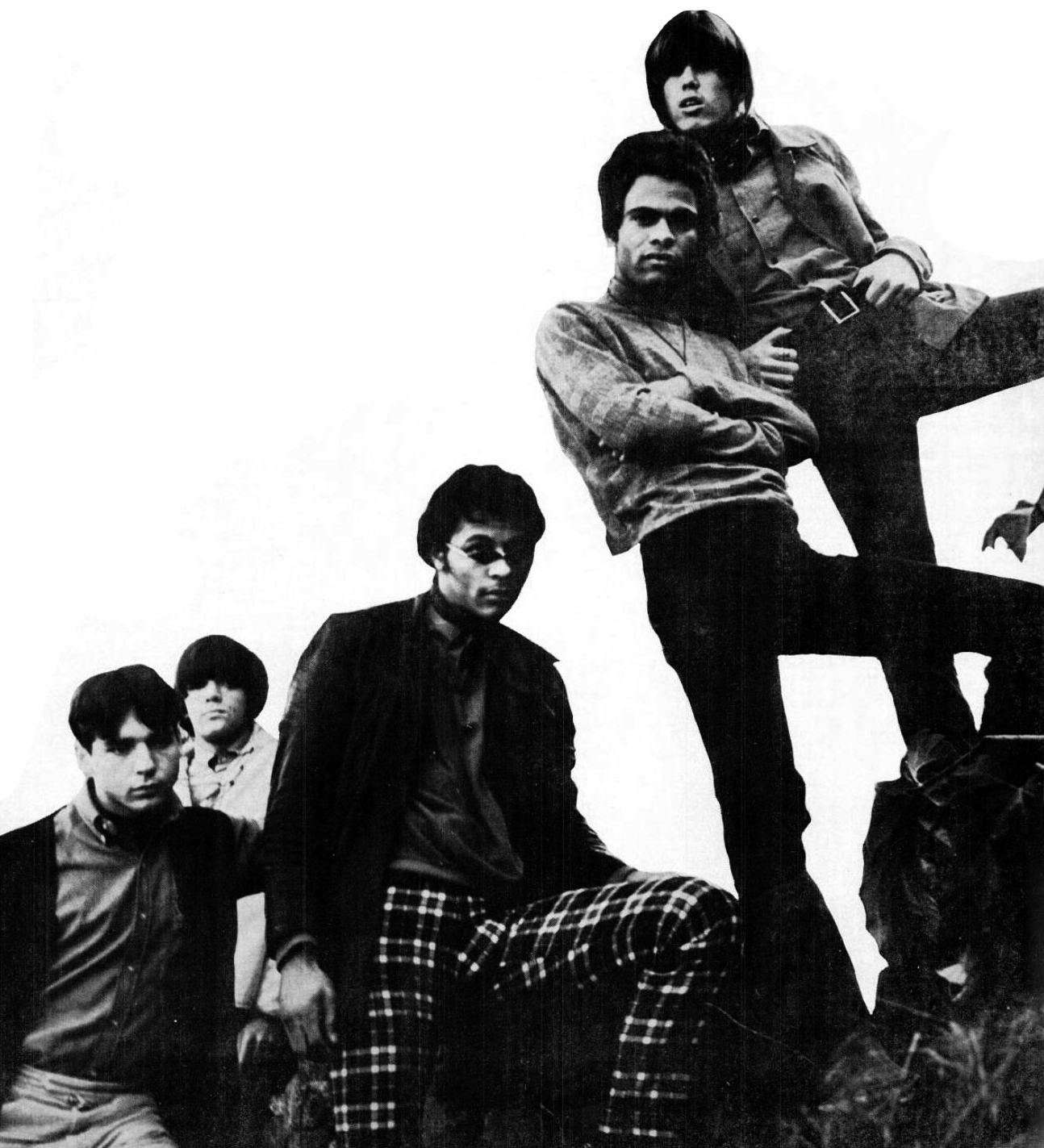
Love in 1966; one year before the beginning of the album's recording.

By 1967, the band was facing major internal conflicts. The members were growing apart and, as a result, rehearsing and performing less. Lee's relationship with MacLean, Love's other songwriter, was deteriorating. In a 1992 interview, Lee spoke of him and MacLean "competing a bit like Lennon and McCartney to see who would come up with the better song. It was part of our charm. Everybody had different behaviour patterns. Eventually, the others couldn't cut it".

Love were also at odds with their label, Elektra Records. After recording Da Capo, the band attempted for a third time to sever their contract with the label. The resulting May 1967 agreement required them to produce one more album. Throughout 1967, Lee also grew envious of the success of fellow Elektra band the Doors, whom he had been integral in getting signed. However, it has been countered that the Doors were more willing to work on the road than Lee, who expressed a fear of leaving the band's home city, Los Angeles.

=== Inspiration ===
Lee's material for Forever Changes was drawn from his lifestyle and environment, which contrasted greatly from the typical hippie culture of the time. The songs reflected upon dark themes, such as paranoia, the Vietnam War, race issues in the US, societal breakdown, and the negative effects of drug use. In his 33 1/3 book on the album, Andrew Hultkrans explained Lee's frame of mind at the time: "Arthur Lee was one member of the '60s counterculture who didn't buy flower-power wholesale, who intuitively understood that letting the sunshine in wouldn't instantly vaporize the world's (or his own) dark stuff". With the band in disarray, and increasingly concerned over his own mortality, Lee envisioned Forever Changes as a lament to his memory.

== Recording and style ==
Having already engineered the group's first two albums, Bruce Botnick was enlisted to oversee the production of the third album along with Lee. Botnick, who had also worked with Buffalo Springfield, invited Neil Young to co-produce the album, but Young, after initially agreeing, excused himself from the project. As Botnick recalled, "Neil really had the burning desire to go solo and realize his dream without being involved in another band". It was reported that Young arranged the song "The Daily Planet", but he denied any involvement.

According to AllMusic, the band embraced "a more gentle, contemplative, and organic sound on Forever Changes," with much of the album "built around interwoven acoustic guitar textures and subtle orchestrations, with strings and horns both reinforcing and punctuating the melodies." Elektra Records founder Jac Holzman had suggested that Love "advance backwards" by embracing the more subtle approach of folk music, and Lee, while typically independent in his musical directions, accepted the suggestion. Stephen M. Deusner of Pitchfork stated that Lee paired his "dark, discomfiting lyrics" with music that draws from rock, psychedelia, folk, pop, classical, and mariachi influences without being reducible to any of those labels.

Love started recording Forever Changes in June 1967 at Sunset Sound Recorders. However, beginning with the early recording sessions, the band was plagued by internal conflicts and lack of preparation for Lee's intricate arrangements. Through Holzman's perspective, Botnick was an "album savior", guiding and motivating the musicians out of their trying period. To compel the band to refocus, Botnick and Lee enlisted Wrecking Crew session musicians Billy Strange (guitar), Don Randi (piano), Hal Blaine (drums), and Carol Kaye (bass guitar) to work with Lee, completing the rhythm tracks for "Andmoreagain" and "The Daily Planet" in a single three-hour session. Shocked by the notion of losing their roles, the plan succeeded in motivating the other Love members to participate in recording the remaining material.

Lee spent three weeks with arranger David Angel, playing and singing the orchestral parts to him. Lee envisioned the horns and strings as part of the material from the beginning. String and horn overdubs on September 18, followed by two more stereo mixing sessions, completed the sessions.

According to the staff of BrooklynVegan, the tensions between Arthur Lee and Bryan MacLean "made for a unique energy" present on the album, said to be "[running] electric." The site described the album's production as "sweeping [and] baroque." NME wrote that the album is "joyous, uplifting and sweet in parts, while at the same time menacing, introverted and paranoid."

== Songs ==
=== Side one ===
"Alone Again Or" was originally written by MacLean for inclusion on Love's first album, but he did not finish it properly until September 1967. It was originally titled "Alone Again", with Lee adding the "Or". Lee initially sang the harmony vocal part; however, his vocal was mixed louder than MacLean's in the final product, effectively becoming the new melody. MacLean was initially upset, but later said that he "wasn't that great of a singer at that point" and understood the change. MacLean later recorded a solo version of the song, and it was released in 1997 on his album Ifyoubelievein.

"A House Is Not a Motel", according to Ben Edmonds, "takes us straight into the heart of Arthur's darkness." The title is an allusion to the song "A House Is Not a Home", written by Burt Bacharach and Hal David for the 1964 film of the same name. The lyrics about blood turning gray when mixed with mud were inspired by a story Lee heard from a Vietnam veteran. Edmonds notes that it is one of the few songs on the album that does not have orchestration and one of only two that has electric lead guitar ("Live and Let Live" being the other). Echols's double-tracked soloing at the end of the song was intended to represent the chaos of war: "people dying, all the wailing, things blowing up [...] all that."

"Andmoreagain" is described by Phil Gallo as "one of the lushest songs on Forever Changes". The title is an allusion to "And More", a song from Love's debut album. Lee denied beliefs that it was an allusion to actress Ann Morgan Guilbert. He described the character Andmoreagain as "a creature", someone he saw in Los Angeles. Gallo also writes that the song shows Lee "embracing MacLean's Broadway influences."

"The Daily Planet" deals with repetition in daily life. Brooks describes it as "an ecological disaster song" and interprates dark themes in the lyrics, such as "accidences and ambulances", children playing with "warfare toys", melting ice caps, drug addiction, and drug dealers.

"Old Man" is the second and final MacLean song on the album. He described it as "simply my expression about a guy that had been told some things by this wise old man but he doesn't understand it until he falls in love with somebody." MacLean also said he was dissatisfied with the orchestration on the song, calling it "over-arranged" and explaining, "It was meant to be simple and direct, almost a folk song." A solo demo of the song was also included on Ifyoubelievein.

"The Red Telephone" begins with the lines, "Sitting on a hillside / Watching all the people die". Edmonds calls the song "a masterpiece of macabre" and writes that, "The harpsichord and strings, normally vessels of warmth in California pop music, instead carry an undertow of menace." David Janssen and Edward Whitelock note that it is "one of the most heavily orchestrated songs on the album" and agree that the harpsichord adds to the song's macabre feeling. At the end, a voice is heard saying, "We're all normal and we want our freedom"; Lee said that this was taken from Peter Weiss's play Marat/Sade. According to Barney Hoskyns, "Lee had seen the play six times", and Andrew Hultkrans, author of the 33^{1}/_{3} book on the album, writes that, "The themes of Marat/Sade resonate throughout Forever Changes."

=== Side two ===
"Maybe the People Would Be the Times or Between Clark and Hilldale" originated in the jazz rock style of Da Capo. Echols said that they were attempting to continue in the style of "Stephanie Knows Who", a song from that album. The phrase "between Clark and Hilldale", according to Edmonds, "refers to the block of Sunset Boulevard containing the Whisky A Go Go". Love were frequent performers at the Whisky, which may be reflected in the lines, "Crowds of people standing everywhere ... And here they always play my song".

"Live and Let Live" was a song left unfinished from Da Capo's recording sessions. Echols said that it did not fit the style of the seven-piece lineup of that time. It is another song noted for its opening lines: "Oh the snot has caked against my pants / It has turned into crystal". Lee explained: "We were in the studio, and I passed out, slobbered on my pants, and woke up. It had crystallized. I wrote about it." The song ends with Echols's guitar solo, which Janssen and Whitelock describe as "anguished and abusive" and "the album's most electric moment."

"The Good Humor Man He Sees Everything Like This" is another song that was worked on during the Da Capo sessions. Specifically, it was recorded as an instrumental demo during the time the band was taping the song "7 and 7 Is". This demo was given the name "Hummingbirds". The song has been described as "idyllic" and "sweet", containing themes of childhood; Lee said he wrote it while sitting outside his old high school, Susan Miller Dorsey High School. The song ends with an intentional "glitched" effect, sounding similar to record skipping.

"Bummer in the Summer" contains elements of country music. Lee said, "I took the riff from an Ike Turner song, and then I turned it into country." Echols also said the song was "kind of a Bo Diddley thing", and Gallo and Brooks draw comparisons to Bob Dylan. Brooks suggests that the title may have been inspired by Bobby Beausoleil, who was nicknamed "Bummer Bob". Beausoleil briefly played rhythm guitar for Love in 1965, when they were still called the Grass Roots. He later joined the Manson Family and was sentenced to life imprisonment for his role in the 1969 murder of Gary Hinman.

"You Set the Scene", nearly 7-minutes long, was pieced together from multiple unfinished songs. Forssi was reportedly instrumental in stitching the parts together, but did not receive songwriting credit. Lee's belief that he would die after the album was finished is especially apparent on the song, with lines such as: "I'll face each day with a smile / Because the time that I've been given is such a little while".

== Title and artwork ==
The title of the album came from a break-up Lee had with his girlfriend. She said, "But you said you would love me forever?" and he replied, "Yeah well, you know, forever changes." The album's title has also been interpreted as meaning Love Forever Changes.

The album's front cover, designed by Bob Pepper, shows the faces of all five members of the band in the shape of a human heart. Fans have also seen it as the shape of Africa. The back cover photo was taken by the band's manager Ronnie Haran, at Lee's house after one of the rehearsals. While taking photos, Haran accidentally knocked over and broke a flower vase. Lee picked it up and is shown holding it in the final product. Some have interpreted the broken vase and dead flowers as symbolizing the "death of flower power", though Lee denied that it had any deeper meaning.

== Release, commercial performance, and aftermath ==
Released in November 1967, Forever Changes initially only achieved moderate commercial success. It peaked at number 154 in the US, the lowest showing of a Love album up to that point. However, it fared much better in the UK, where it reached number 24. Holzman partially attributed the album's small impact to the fact that it was released in November, only to be overshadowed by the Christmas market rush.

The underwhelming reaction to Forever Changes from the general public further contributed to the band's state of disarray. Live performances became less and less frequent, and the members' addictions to heroin and cocaine worsened. This line-up of Love released one more single, "Your Mind and We Belong Together"/"Laughing Stock", in May 1968. It was later falsely rumored that these songs were meant to be the beginning of work on another album titled Gethsemane. Lee was also angered by the prospect of MacLean recording a solo album for Elektra. By August 1968, Lee had replaced the members of Love with a new line-up that "hated Forever Changes" and took a more hard rock and blues rock direction.

== Critical reception ==
=== Contemporaneous reviews ===
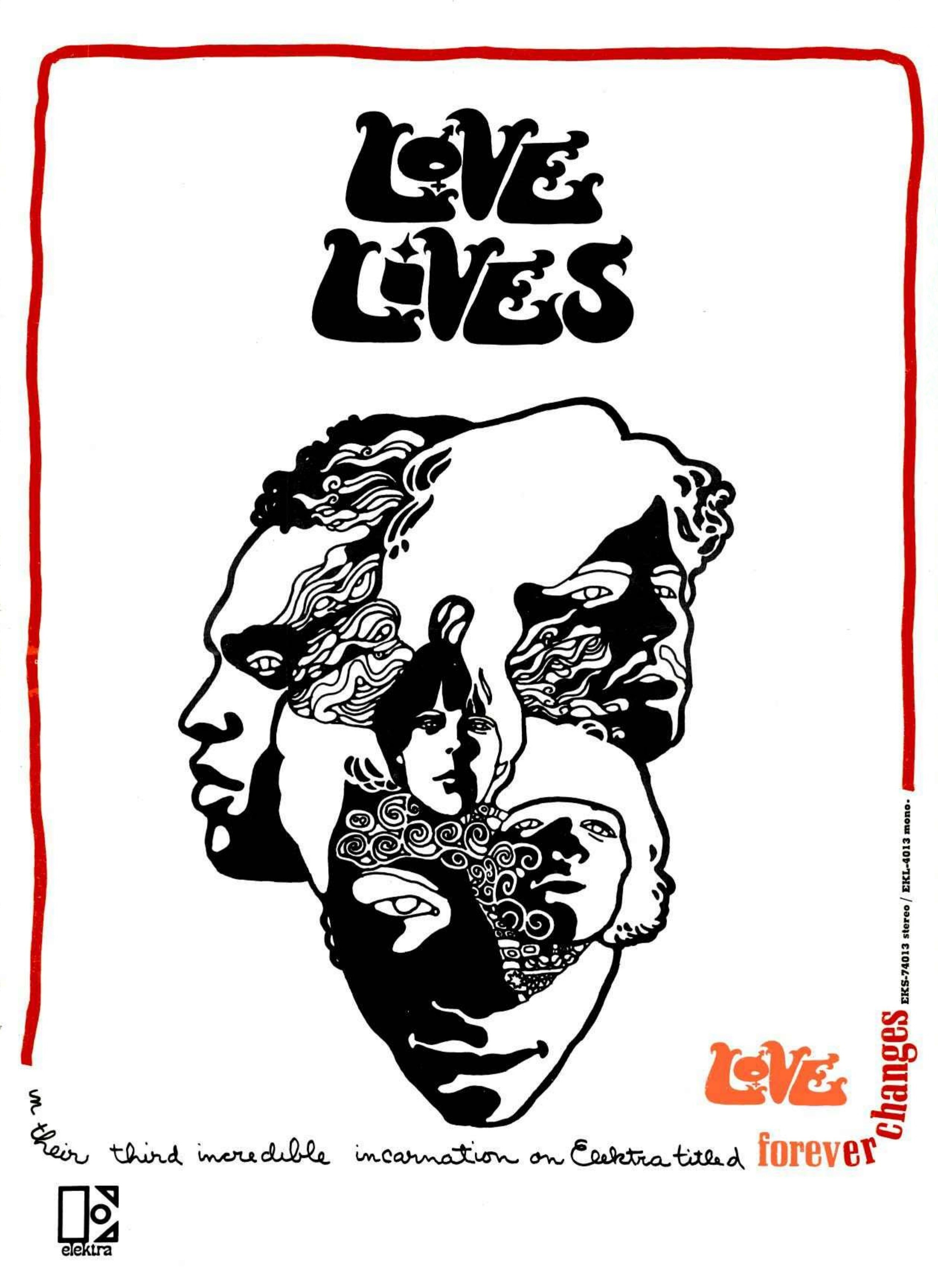
Billboard advertisement, January 27, 1968

Initial reviews were positive. Writing for Rolling Stone in 1968, Jim Bickhart regarded Forever Changes as Love's "most sophisticated album yet", applauding the orchestral arrangements and recording quality. In Esquire, Robert Christgau called it an elaboration on Love's original musical style and "a vast improvement" over their previous recordings, because "Lee has stopped trying to imitate Mick Jagger with his soft voice, and the lyrics, while still obscure, now have an interesting surface as well." Pete Johnson of the Los Angeles Times believed the album could "survive endless listening with no diminishing either of power or of freshness", adding that "parts of the album are beautiful; others are disturbingly ugly, reflections of the pop movement towards realism". Gene Youngblood of LA Free Express also praised the album, calling it "melancholy iconoclasm and tasteful romanticism." Harvey Kubernik believed that the reaction to Forever Changes in Los Angeles was comparable to that of the Beatles' Sgt. Pepper's Lonely Hearts Club Band in the UK.

=== Retrospective acclaim ===
Professional ratings
Retrospective reviews
Review scores
Source	Rating
AllMusic	5/5 stars
The Encyclopedia of Popular Music	5/5 stars
The Great Rock Discography	10/10
NME	10/10
The Rolling Stone Album Guide	5/5 stars
Slant Magazine	4.5/5 stars
Sputnikmusic	5/5
Uncut	5/5 stars
The Village Voice	A−

After the initial reactions to Forever Changes died down, the album maintained a cult following, with Richie Unterberger calling it "the biggest cult album of all time, its following just growing and growing through subsequent decades and generations." Biographer John Einarson agrees, adding that "its reputation as one of the greatest albums of all time has been built almost exclusively by rediscovery and word of mouth." In a retrospective review, AllMusic stated that the album "became recognized as one of the finest and most haunting albums to come out of the Summer of Love," calling it "an album that heralds the last days of a golden age and anticipates the growing ugliness that would dominate the counterculture in 1968 and 1969." The 1979 edition of The Rolling Stone Record Guide gave the album a rating of five stars (out of five). It also received five stars in the 1983 edition of the guide and in the 1992 guide four. In a special issue of Mojo magazine, Forever Changes was ranked the second greatest psychedelic album of all time. In the January 1996 issue, Mojo readers selected Forever Changes as number 11 on the "100 Greatest Albums Ever Made". In 2002, nine members of the UK Parliament signed a motion declaring Forever Changes "the greatest album of all time".

In a survey of 1960s folk rock, Richie Unterberger named the album his second favorite of the genre, but only 24th in terms of historical importance.

== Reissues ==
Forever Changes was included in its entirety on the 2-CD retrospective Love compilation Love Story 1966–1972, released by Rhino Records in 1995. The album was re-released in an expanded single-CD version by Rhino in 2001, featuring alternate mixes, outtakes and the group's 1968 single, "Your Mind and We Belong Together"/"Laughing Stock", the final tracks ever to feature the Forever Changes line-up of Arthur Lee, Johnny Echols, Ken Forssi, Michael Stuart-Ware and Bryan MacLean (Forssi and MacLean both died in 1998).

The Forever Changes Concert was released on DVD in 2003 and marked the first time many of the songs had been performed live. The set features the entire album performed in its original running order, recorded in early 2003 during Lee's tour of England, in which he was backed by the band Baby Lemonade and members of the Stockholm Strings 'n' Horns ensemble. The DVD features the album concert, five bonus performances, documentary footage and an interview with Lee.

A double-CD "Collector's Edition" of the album was issued by Rhino Records on April 22, 2008. The first disc consists of a remastered version of the original 1967 album. The second disc contains a previously unissued alternate stereo mix of the album, plus ten bonus tracks.

A Super High Material CD (SHM-CD) version of Forever Changes was released by Warner Music Japan in 2009, and a 24 bit 192 kHz High Resolution version of the album was released by HDTracks in 2014, and in the same year a hybrid Super Audio CD (SACD) version of the album was released by Mobile Fidelity Sound Lab.

A 50th anniversary deluxe edition box set was released by Rhino on April 6, 2018, featuring four CDs, a DVD and an LP. It contains remastered versions of the stereo, mono and alternate stereo mixes of the album, a disc of demos, outtakes, alternate mixes and non-album tracks, a DVD containing a 24/96 stereo mix of the album and a bonus music video, and a new LP remaster of the album, remastered by Bruce Botnick and cut from high resolution audio by Bernie Grundman.

== Legacy ==
Forever Changes was inducted into the Grammy Hall of Fame in 2008 and added to the National Recording Registry in 2011. Rolling Stone ranked it number 180 on its 2020 list of the 500 Greatest Albums of All Time. The album was also included in Robert Christgau's "Basic Record Library" of 1950s and 1960s recordings, published in Christgau's Record Guide: Rock Albums of the Seventies (1981). It was voted number 12 in Colin Larkin's All Time Top 1000 Albums 3rd Edition (2000). In 2013, NME ranked the album number 37 on their list of The 500 Greatest Albums of All Time. Publishers such as AllMusic and Slant Magazine have praised the album as well. In a 2005 survey held by British television's Channel 4, the album was ranked 83rd in the 100 greatest albums of all time. The album was included in the 2005 book 1001 Albums You Must Hear Before You Die.

According to NME, the Stone Roses' relationship with their future producer John Leckie was settled when they all agreed that Forever Changes was the "best record ever". Robert Plant is an admirer of the album.

The staff of BrooklynVegan named the album as the best psychedelic rock album of the Summer of Love, and NME named the album as the greatest psychedelic album of all time.

== Track listing ==
All songs written by Arthur Lee, except "Alone Again Or" and "Old Man" by Bryan MacLean. Details are taken from the 50th Anniversary Edition. Bonus track "Wooly Bully" written by Sam Samudio.

Side one
No.	Title	Recorded	Length
1.	"Alone Again Or"	September 10, 1967	3:18
2.	"A House Is Not a Motel"	August 11 & September 10, 1967	3:32
3.	"Andmoreagain"	June 9, 12 & August 11, 1967	3:22
4.	"The Daily Planet"	June 9–10 & September 25, 1967	3:31
5.	"Old Man"	August 12 & September 25, 1967	3:03
6.	"The Red Telephone"	August 12 & September 21, 25, 1967	4:46
Total length:			21:32

Side two
No.	Title	Recorded	Length
7.	"Maybe the People Would Be the Times or Between Clark and Hilldale"	September 10, 1967	3:35
8.	"Live and Let Live"	August 11, 1967	5:28
9.	"The Good Humor Man He Sees Everything Like This"	August 11, 1967	3:09
10.	"Bummer in the Summer"	August 12, 1967	2:25
11.	"You Set the Scene"	August 12, 1967	6:50
Total length:			21:27

2001 Rhino bonus tracks

A single disc collection, presenting the original stereo album, remastered, plus the following bonus tracks:

No.	Title	Length
12.	"Hummingbirds" (Demo)	2:43
13.	"Wonder People (I Do Wonder)" (Outtake)	3:28
14.	"Alone Again Or" (Alternate Mix)	2:55
15.	"You Set the Scene" (Alternate Mix)	7:01
16.	"Your Mind and We Belong Together" (Tracking Sessions Highlights)	8:16
17.	"Your Mind and We Belong Together" (Single A-side)	4:27
18.	"Laughing Stock" (B-side of "Your Mind and We Belong Together")	2:31

2008 Rhino "Collector's Edition" bonus tracks

A two-disc collection. Disc 1 presents the original stereo album, remastered, while disc 2 is a previously unreleased alternate stereo mix of the album, featuring the following bonus tracks:

No.	Title	Length
12.	"Wonder People (I Do Wonder)" (Outtake, Original Mix)	3:21
13.	"Hummingbirds" (Demo)	2:41
14.	"A House Is Not a Motel" (Backing Track)	3:11
15.	"Andmoreagain" (Alternate Electric Backing Track)	3:08
16.	"The Red Telephone" (Tracking Sessions Highlights)	2:07
17.	"Wooly Bully" (Outtake)	1:27
18.	"Alone Again Or" (Mono Single Remix)	2:54
19.	"Your Mind and We Belong Together" (Tracking Sessions Highlights)	8:16
20.	"Your Mind and We Belong Together" (Single A-side)	4:27
21.	"Laughing Stock" (B-side of "Your Mind and We Belong Together")	2:31

2018 "50th Anniversary Edition" bonus discs

A box set comprising four CDs, one LP and one DVD: disc 2 presents the original mono album, remastered; disc 3 is the alternate stereo mix; disc 4 is outtakes, single versions, demos, session highlights and non album tracks from the era; disc 5 is the original stereo album on vinyl, remastered and cut from high resolution audio; and disc 6 is a 24/96 stereo mix on DVD, featuring a bonus music video.

Disc 3
No.	Title	Length
12.	"Wonder People (I Do Wonder)" (Outtake; Alternate Mix)	3:23

Disc 4
No.	Title	Length
1.	"Wonder People (I Do Wonder)" (Outtake; Original Mix)	3:20
2.	"Alone Again Or" (Single Version)	2:48
3.	"A House Is Not a Motel" (Single Version)	3:22
4.	"Hummingbirds" (demo of "The Good Humor Man He Sees Everything Like This")	2:41
5.	"A House Is Not a Motel" (Backing Track)	3:06
6.	"Andmoreagain" (Alternate Electric Backing Track)	3:06
7.	"The Red Telephone" (Tracking Sessions Highlights)	2:07
8.	"Wooly Bully" (Domingo Samudio; Outtake)	1:25
9.	"Live and Let Live" (Backing Track)	5:37
10.	"Wonder People (I Do Wonder)" (Outtake; Backing Track)	3:30
11.	"Your Mind and We Belong Together" (Tracking Sessions Highlights)	8:16
12.	"Your Mind and We Belong Together" (Single A-side)	4:27
13.	"Laughing Stock" (B-side of "Your Mind and We Belong Together")	2:34
14.	"Alone Again Or" (Mono Single Remix)	2:51

Disc 6
No.	Title	Length
12.	"Your Mind and We Belong Together" (Video)	4:27

== Personnel ==
According to the 2001 reissue CD booklet.

Love

- Arthur Lee – guitar, vocals
- Bryan MacLean – guitar, vocals
- Johnny Echols – guitar
- Ken Forssi – bass guitar
- Michael Stuart-Ware – drums, percussion

Additional musicians

- Carol Kaye – bass guitar on "Andmoreagain" and "The Daily Planet"
- Don Randi – keyboards on "Andmoreagain" and "The Daily Planet"; piano on "Old Man" and "Bummer in the Summer"; harpsichord on "The Red Telephone"
- Billy Strange – electric guitar on "Andmoreagain" and "The Daily Planet"
- Hal Blaine – drums on "Andmoreagain" and "The Daily Planet"
- Neil Young – arranger on "The Daily Planet"
- David Angel – arranger
- Robert Barene, Arnold Belnick, James Getzoff, Marshall Sosson, Darrel Terwilliger – violin
- Norman Botnick – viola
- Jesse Ehrlich – cello
- Chuck Berghofer – double bass
- Bud Brisbois, Roy Caton, Ollie Mitchell – trumpet
- Richard Leith – trombone

Production and design

- Bruce Botnick and Arthur Lee – producers
- Bruce Botnick – engineer
- Jac Holzman – production supervisor
- Zal Schreiber – mastering
- William S. Harvey – cover design
- Bob Pepper – cover art
- Ronnie Haran – back cover photo
- Andrew Sandoval – project producer
- Andrew Sandoval, Dan Hersch, Bill Inglot – remastering (disc 1)
- Steve Hoffman – remastering (disc 2, tracks 1–11)
- Dan Hersch and Andrew Sandoval – remastering (disc 2, tracks 12–21)
- Michael Kachko – product manager
- Andrew Sandoval – liner notes
- Amanda Smith – art supervision
- Vanessa Atkins and Cory Frye – editorial supervision

== Charts ==
Chart performance for Forever Changes
Chart (1968)	Peak position
US Billboard 200	154
UK Albums (Official Charts)	24

Chart (2001)	Peak position
Scottish Albums (Official Charts)	80
UK Albums (Official Charts)	63
UK Rock & Metal Albums (Official Charts)	7

Chart (2018)	Peak position
Scottish Albums (Official Charts)	70

Chart (2025)	Peak position
Greek Albums (IFPI)	18

== See also ==
- Timeline of 1960s counterculture
