= Vindicator (album) =

Studio album by Arthur Lee
- Released: August 1972
- Recorded: 1972
- Studio: A&M Studios, Hollywood, California
- Genre: Rock and roll; hard rock; psychedelic rock
- Length: 35:51
- Label: A&M
- Producer: Arthur Lee; Allan McDougall

Arthur Lee chronology
Vindicator (1972)	Black Beauty (1973)

Professional ratings
Review scores
Source	Rating
Allmusic	link
Creem	B−
NME	4/10
Uncut	1/5 stars

Vindicator is the first solo album by Arthur Lee, formerly of the rock band Love, released in 1972. The backing musicians are credited as Band-Aid.

A cover of the track "Everybody's Gotta Live" was recorded by American rapper and singer Mac Miller, and released on his posthumous album Circles in 2020.

== Track listing ==
All tracks composed by Arthur Lee; except where indicated

1. "Sad Song" – 2:20
2. "You Can Save Up to 50%, But You're Still a Long Ways from Home" – 0:17
3. "Love Jumped Through My Window" – 2:56
4. "Find Somebody" – 3:47
5. "He Said She Said" – 2:18
6. "Every Time I Look Up I'm Down or White Dog (I Don't Know What That Means!)" – 3:57
7. "Everybody's Gotta Live" – 3:31
8. "You Want Change for Your Re-Run" – 4:17
9. "He Knows a Lot of Good Women (Or Scotty's Song)" – 3:14
10. "Hamburger Breath Stinkfinger" – 2:44
11. "Ol' Morgue Mouth" – 0:53
12. "Busted Feet" (Arthur Lee, Charles Karp) – 4:53

Bonus tracks

13. "Everybody's Gotta Live" – 3:37
14. "He Knows a Lot of Good Women" – 3:16
15. "Pencil in Hand" – 2:15
16. "E-Z Rider" (Jimi Hendrix) – 2:58
17. "Looking Glass Looking at Me" – 4:05

== Personnel ==
=== Musicians ===
- Arthur Lee – rhythm guitar, vocals
- Charlie Karp – lead guitar
- Frank Fayad – bass (tracks 4,10,11)
- Clarence McDonald – organ on "Find Somebody"
- Don Poncher – drums
- Craig Tarwater – lead guitar (tracks 4,10,11)
- David Hull – bass

=== Technical ===
- Allan McDougall, Arthur Lee – producers
- Tommy Vicari – engineer
- Steve Mitchell – assistant engineer
- Roland Young – art direction
- Elijah Alfred – cover photography
- Jim McCrary, Jeffery Eisen, Shepard Sherbell, Herbert Worthington – additional photography
