= Marissa Ribisi =

American actress (born 1974)

- Born: December 17, 1974 (age 51)
- Occupation: Actress
- Years active: 1988–2003; 2021
- Spouse: Beck (m. 2004; div. 2021)
- Children: 2
- Relatives: Giovanni Ribisi (twin brother)

Marissa Ribisi (born December 17, 1974) is an American actress. She has appeared in the films Dazed and Confused (1993), The Brady Bunch Movie (1995), Pleasantville (1998), True Crime (1999), and Don's Plum (2001) and television shows such as Felicity, Friends, Grace Under Fire, Watching Ellie, and Tales of the City. She is the twin sister of actor Giovanni Ribisi.

== Early life ==
Ribisi was born in Los Angeles, California on December 17, 1974. Her father, Al Ribisi, is a musician who was the keyboard player of People! and her mother, Gay, is a talent manager. Ribisi began acting when she was nine years old. Her twin brother, Giovanni, is also an actor. Like her brother, she is a Scientologist.

== Career ==
Ribisi first appeared on television in 1988, playing a minor red-haired character, possibly because she's a natural redhead, named Ginger in "She'll Get Over It", an episode of My Two Dads. This was followed by similar brief appearances in Baywatch ("Old Friends" 1990), DEA (1991), and the miniseries Tales of the City (1993), playing a receptionist.

Ribisi's first role in a feature film was in the 1993 film Dazed and Confused. She starred alongside Matthew McConaughey and Adam Goldberg, who were then, like Ribisi, unknowns. The actress played Cynthia, a socially marginalized girl who runs with two verbose outsiders (Goldberg and Anthony Rapp).

In 1998, Ribisi cowrote the film Some Girl and starred in it alongside Juliette Lewis, Michael Rapaport, and Giovanni Ribisi. The film, directed by Rory Kelly, relates the story of insecure young women searching for long-term relationships in 1990s Los Angeles. She has had roles in the films True Crime, The Brady Bunch Movie, Pleasantville, and Don's Plum. She has also appeared in television shows such as Felicity, Friends, Grace Under Fire, and Watching Ellie, as well as the TV miniseries Tales of the City.

She also appeared on the short-lived TV series Grown Ups from 1999 to 2000. In 2001 she played the role of Dora in the movie 100 Girls. In October 2007, Ribisi launched a fashion line, Whitley Kros, with partner Sophia Banks.

== Personal life ==
Ribisi married musician and recording artist Beck in April 2004, shortly before giving birth to their son. The couple's second child was born in 2007. On February 15, 2019, Beck filed for divorce from Ribisi after nearly 15 years of marriage. Their divorce was finalized on September 3, 2021.

== Filmography ==
=== Film ===
Year	Title	Role	Notes
1993	Dazed and Confused	Cynthia Dunn	
1995	The Brady Bunch Movie	Holly	
1995	Kicking and Screaming	Charlotte	
1996	The Size of Watermelons	Lizzie	
1996	Not Again!	Rita	
1997	Changing Habits	Erin	
1997	Looking for Lola	Babs	
1997	Dinner and Driving	Jenise	
1998	Some Girl	Angie	
1998	Pleasantville	Kimmy	
1998	Wild Horses	Dakota	
1999	True Crime	Amy Wilson	
2000	100 Girls	Dora	
2001	Don's Plum	Tracy	
2001	According to Spencer	Wendy	

=== Television ===
Year	Title	Role	Notes
1988	My Two Dads	Ginger	Episode: "She'll Get Over It"
1990	Baywatch	Paula	Episode: "Old Friends"
1991	DEA	Wendy	Episode: "Zero Sum Game"
1993	Tales of the City	Receptionist	Episode: "Episode #1.4"
1994	Grace Under Fire	Shelley Sullivan	Episode: "Valentine's Day"
1994	Reform School Girl	Joanie Dubois	Television film
1994	Rebel Highway	Joanie Dubois	Episode: "Reform School Girl"
1995	Cybill	Annie	Episode: "The Replacements"
1996	Encino Woman	Fiona	Television film
1996	Friends	Betsy	Episode: "The One with the Flashback"
1997	Hollywood Confidential	Zoey	Television film
1997	Union Square	Teresa	Episode: "Enjoy Your Haddock"
1998	The Patron Saint of Liars	Angie	Television film
1998	Felicity	Astrid	2 episodes
1998–1999	Tracey Takes On...	Denise / Angie	3 episodes
1999–2000	Grown Ups	Shari Hammel	22 episodes
2003	Watching Ellie	Veronica	Episode: "Feud"
2021	On the Verge	Helen	2 episodes
