= Baby Lemonade (band) =

American neo-psychedelia band

Baby Lemonade is an American band in the neo-psychedelia genre formed in Los Angeles, California, United States.

The band was formed in 1992 by friends Rusty Squeezebox, Mike Randle and David Green, later adding bassist Dave Chapple in place of Henry Liu. Mike Randle and Rusty Squeezebox were previously members of Los Angeles band Bad Press. In 1993, they began performing with Arthur Lee of Love, while maintaining their own career as Baby Lemonade. They released the album 68% Pure Imagination in 1996, and their 1998 album Exploring Music was produced by Darian Sahanaja of The Wondermints. Randle and Squeezebox both issued solo albums in 2000 before recording the final Baby Lemonade album, The High Life Suite, in 2001.

The group was Arthur Lee's backing band prior to his incarceration in 1996, and after his release from prison in 2001 until his death in 2006. As such, they provided the most stable line-up of Love in the band's history, and toured worldwide between 2002 and 2005. In July 2005, the band was due to perform in the UK with Arthur Lee and the original Love guitarist Johnny Echols. However, when the band got to the airport ready to fly to England, Arthur Lee refused to leave the States. The other members of the band, including Echols, decided to carry on without Lee and played a foreshortened series of gigs under the name "The Love Band". The following year it was announced that Lee had been diagnosed with acute myeloid leukaemia, which led to his death in August 2006.

In 2008, Baby Lemonade performed the Beatles' album Sgt. Pepper's Lonely Hearts Club Band in Milan, Italy, with the London Sinfonietta. They have also performed with Marianne Faithfull, Alex Chilton, Robyn Hitchcock, Peter Murphy, Russell Mael, Jarvis Cocker, Badly Drawn Boy, Beth Orton and The Residents. A compilation CD, Best of Baby Lemonade, was released in 2008. As at 2016, the band continue to perform as Baby Lemonade, while also touring with Johnny Echols as Love Revisited or The Love Band.

The name Baby Lemonade comes from a track on Syd Barrett's album Barrett.

== Line-up ==
- Rusty Squeezebox (born David Ramsey)- vocals, guitar
- Mike Randle - guitar, vocals
- James Nolte - Bass, Vocals
- David "Daddy-O" Green - drums

=== Former members ===
- Henry Liu - bass
- David Chapple - bass, vocals, harmonica
