= High Moon Records =

- Founded: 2010
- Founder: George Baer Wallace, J. D. Martignon
- Status: Active
- Genre: Various
- Country of origin: United States
- Official website: highmoonrecords.com

High Moon Records is a record label that is concerned with reissues. It has released material by artists including Arthur Lee, Laurie Styvers, Sly & the Family Stone and Lotti Golden.

== Background ==
The record label was founded in 2010 by George Baer Wallace and French record dealer and record label owner, J.D. Martignon. According to Ugly Things, High Moon Records is a "boutique reissue record label with a catalog of essential releases" with "deluxe packaging, never-before-seen archival photos and often with rare bonus tracks"

Co-founder J.D. Martignon died in 2016.

== History ==
=== 2010s ===
in 2014, the label issued Arthur Lee's Black Beauty album. Prior to that, the only recorded versions of the album that were available were crude bootlegs. In a review of the album by Qobuz, the High Moon release of the album which was mastered from an acetate, while not flawless was said to be acceptable and far better than the bootlegs.

In November 2018, High Moon Records were set to release the debut album by Ace of Cups, an all-female rock band from San Francisco, who in spite of being around fifty years prior, had never been signed to a label.

=== 2020s ===
In 2023, High Moon Records issued Gemini Girl: The Complete Hush Recordings by Laurie Styvers which was described by Goldmine as the first-ever comprehensive anthology of her work. The following year, the label issued her Let Me Comfort You: The Hush Rarities album which was a vinyl LP only release.

In early February 2025, High Moon Records issued The Nest, an album by 1960s San Francisco-based singer, Jeannie Piersol.

High Moon Records managed to get hold of master tapes by Sly & the Family Stone, from the band's recordings during the time they were a resident group at the Winchester Cathedral venue from late December 1966 to April 1967. They compiled the recordings which were released on album, The First Family - Live at the Winchester Cathedral 1967 on 12 April 2025. In April 2025, the label re-issued Lotti Golden's Motor-Cycle album.

In 2025, High Moon is set to issue Arthur Lee's Just to Remind You album which is made up of Lee's recordings from the period of 1990 to 2005.
