= Love (band) =

American rock group

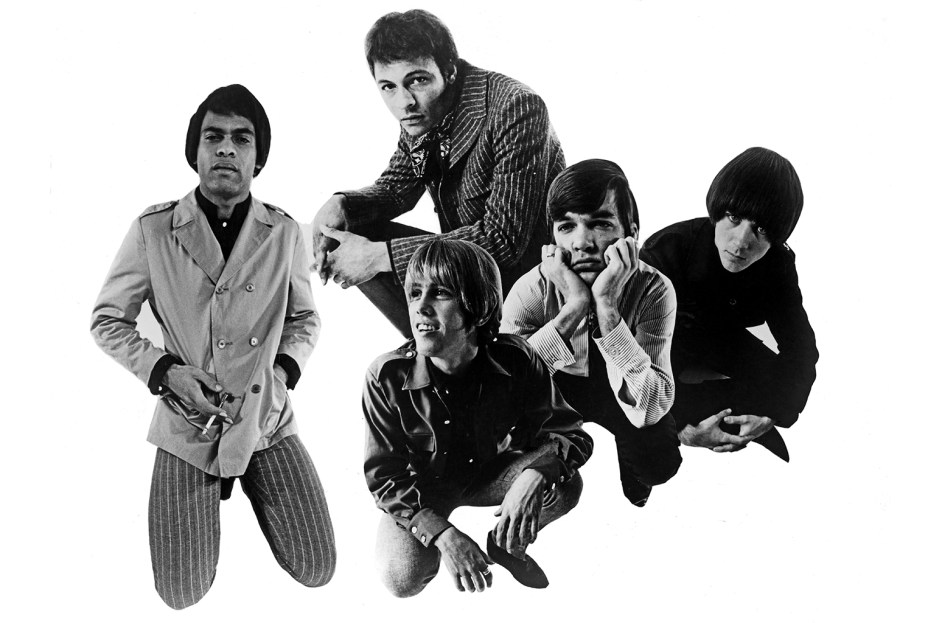
- Love in 1967 (L–R: Johnny Echols, Bryan MacLean, Arthur Lee (top), Ken Forssi, Michael Stuart

Background information
- Origin: Los Angeles, California, U.S.
- Genres: Psychedelic rock; folk rock; garage rock; acid rock
- Years active: 1965–1975; 1992–present
- Labels: Elektra; Blue Thumb; Harvest; RSO; Rhino; Sundazed; Big Beat
- Members: Johnny Echols; Mike Randle; David Green; Rusty Squeezebox; James Nolte
- Past members: See members section
- Website: lovearthurlee.com

Love is an American rock band formed in Los Angeles in 1965. Led by Arthur Lee, the band's primary songwriter, they were one of the first racially diverse American rock bands. Their sound incorporated styles including psychedelic rock, folk rock and garage. While finding only modest success on the music charts, first with the song "My Little Red Book," the first hit record released by Elektra Records, which reached number one on the LA charts and, in June 1966, peaked at number 52 on the Billboard Hot 100 and number 35 on the Cash Box Top 100. The group also peaked in the US singles chart with their No. 33 hit "7 and 7 Is". Love would come to be praised by critics as their third album, Forever Changes (1967), became generally regarded as one of the best albums of the 1960s.

The band's classic lineup is considered to consist of Lee, the guitarist and singer Bryan MacLean, the bassist Ken Forssi, the guitarist Johnny Echols and the drummer Donnie Conka, who was replaced by Alban "Snoopy" Pfisterer. By 1968, only Lee remained and he continued recording as Love with various members through the 1970s. MacLean and Forssi died in 1998. Lee died in 2006. Forever Changes was added to the Library of Congress's National Recording Registry in 2011. In recent years, original member Johnny Echols has toured under the title of the Love Band or Love Revisited.

== History ==
=== Formation and early years ===
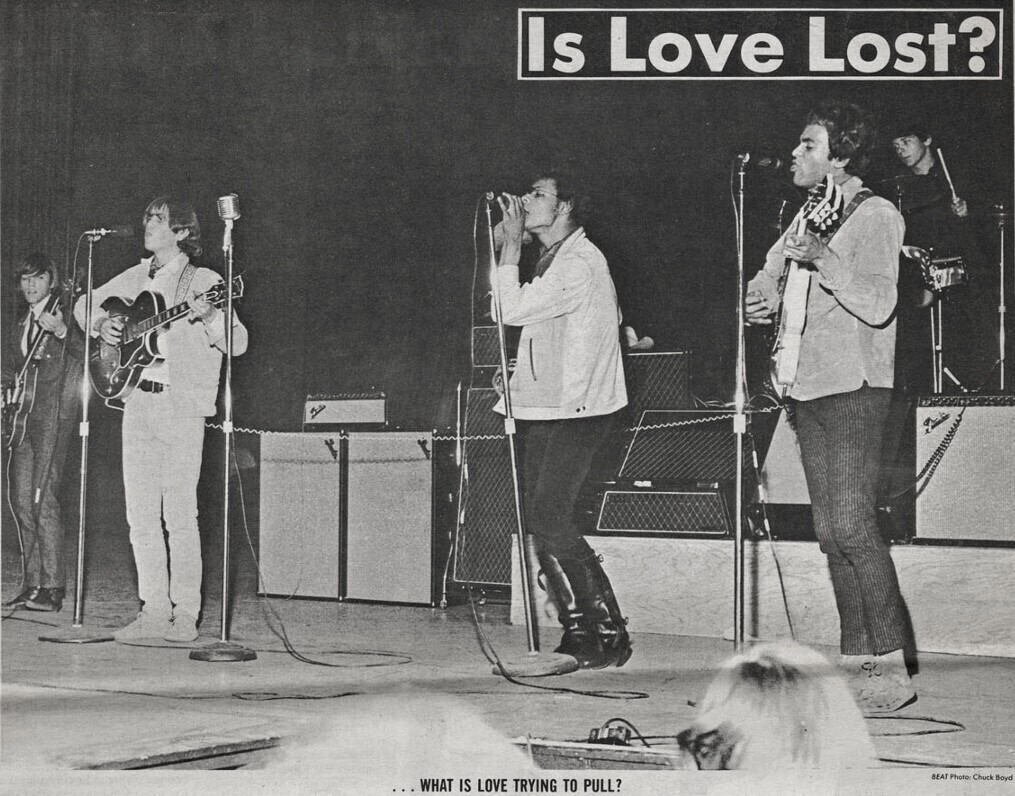
Love performing c. mid-1966

Singer/multi-instrumentalist Arthur Lee, who was originally from Memphis, Tennessee but had lived in Los Angeles since the age of five, had been recording since 1963 with his bands the LAG's and Lee's American Four. He wrote and produced the single "My Diary" for Rosa Lee Brooks in 1964, which featured Jimi Hendrix on guitar. The Sons Of Adam, which included future Love drummer Michael Stuart, recorded the Lee composition "Feathered Fish". After attending a performance by the Byrds, Lee decided to form a band that joined the newly minted folk-rock sound of the Byrds to his primarily rhythm and blues style.

Singer/guitarist Bryan MacLean, who had met Lee when he was working as a roadie for The Byrds, joined Lee's new band, which was first called the Grass Roots. MacLean had also been playing in bands around Los Angeles since about 1963. Also joining the band was another Memphis native, lead guitarist Johnny Echols, and drummer Don Conka. A short time later, Conka was replaced by Alban "Snoopy" Pfisterer. Love's first bassist, Johnny Fleckenstein, went on to join the Standells in 1967. Fleckenstein was replaced by Ken Forssi (formerly of a post-"Wipe Out" lineup of the Surfaris). Upon the appearance of another group called the Grass Roots, Lee changed the name of the new band to Love.

Love started playing the Los Angeles clubs in April 1965 and became a popular local attraction, while gaining the attention of the Rolling Stones and the Yardbirds. The band lived communally in a house called "the Castle", a large but run-down residence sourced by Ronnie Haran. It was a dilapidated mansion that the band was allowed to live in if they did the maintenance and paid the taxes. According to John Einarson in the book Forever Changes, the cover photo of their first two albums was of the band taken in Laurel Canyon at a burned down house that only had the remains of a fireplace left standing.

Signed to Elektra Records as the label's first rock act, the band scored a minor hit single in 1966 with their version of Burt Bacharach and Hal David's "My Little Red Book". Their first album, Love, was released in March 1966. The album sold moderately well and reached No. 57 on the Billboard 200 chart. The single "7 and 7 Is", released in July 1966 (from their second LP Da Capo), gained notice for the exceptional guitar work of Johnny Echols and proto-punk style drumming of Pfisterer. The single became Love's highest-charting single at No. 33 in the Billboard Hot 100. Two more members were added around this time, Tjay Cantrelli (real name John Barbieri) on woodwinds and Michael Stuart on drums. Pfisterer, never a confident drummer, switched to harpsichord. Elektra's art director, William S. Harvey, designed a distinctive logo for the band, "four cartoonish letters with exaggerated, curvaceous serifs", incorporating male and female symbols.

Arthur Lee had an exclusive contract with Herb Cohen for a short time after signing with Elektra Records. After Lee met Ronnie Haran, booking manager for the Whisky a Go Go, Cohen was fired by Arthur in favor of Haran. Haran continued to manage Love, despite not having an official contract, for a couple years. Mike Gruber took over after Haran departed as manager, though Haran remained somewhat involved with the group.

=== Forever Changes era ===
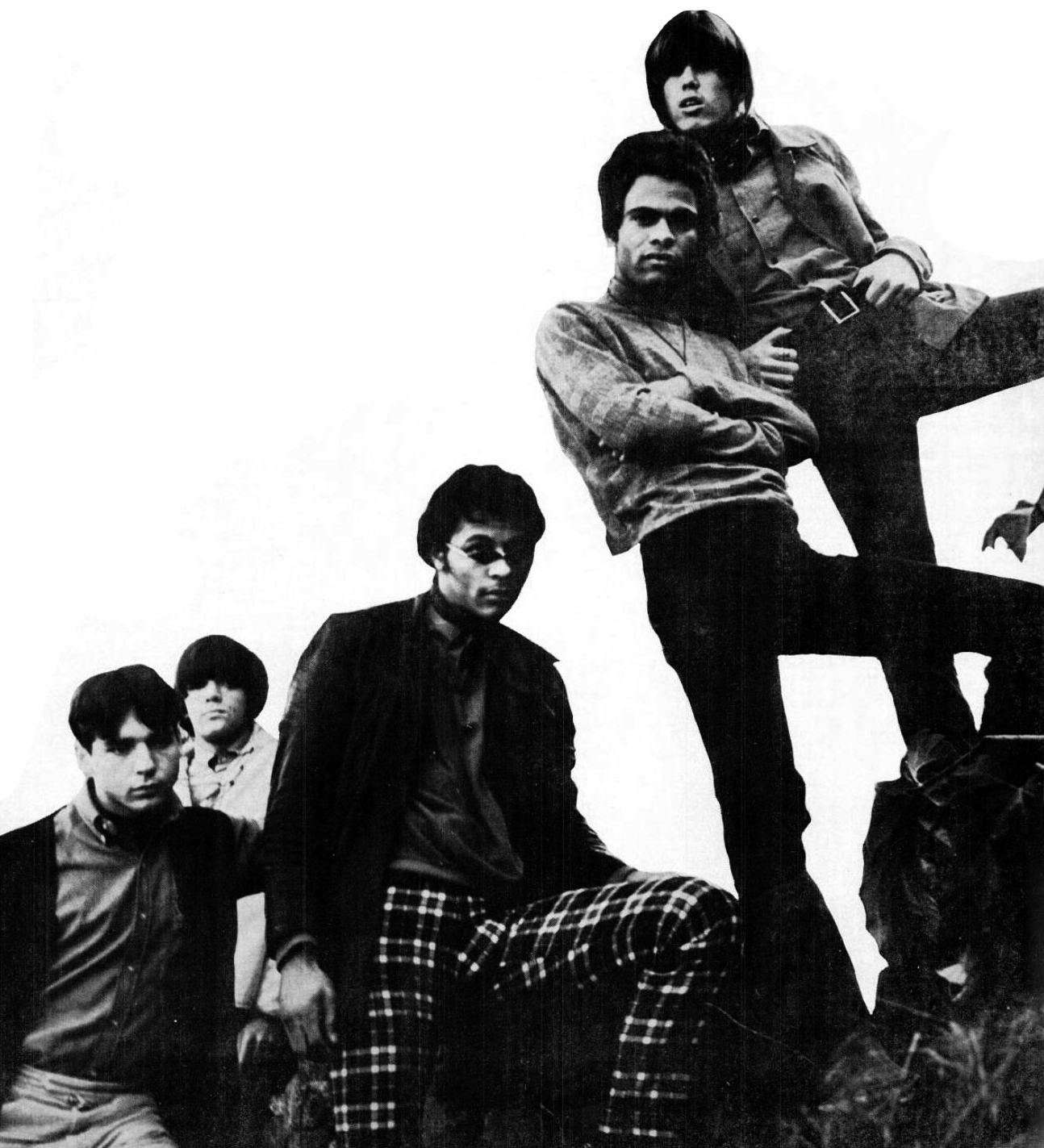
Love, pictured in a 1966 promo for the single "My Little Red Book".

Love's second album, Da Capo, was released in November 1966 and included "7 and 7 Is" as well as the subsequent singles "She Comes in Colors" and "¡Que Vida!". It marked the experimental direction Arthur wanted to take. With the seven member lineup for Da Capo, shortly after this album, Cantrelli and Pfisterer left the band, leaving it as a five-piece once again. Their third album Forever Changes was released in November 1967 and was co-produced by Bruce Botnick. The album displayed a softer and more avant-garde approach for the band. By this time, tension arose between Arthur Lee and Bryan MacLean, who wanted more of his songs on the album. The band recorded the album in only 64 hours, though many professional session players were used, including some who replaced actual band members in one or two songs. Writer Richard Meltzer, in his book The Aesthetics of Rock, commented on Love's "orchestral moves", "post-doper word contraction cuteness", and Lee's vocal style that serves as a "reaffirmation of Johnny Mathis". Forever Changes had one single, MacLean's "Alone Again Or", which reached number 123 on the pop charts. By this stage, Love were far more popular in the UK, where the album reached No. 24, than in their home country, where it could only reach No. 154. Forever Changes has since received recognition as one of the greatest rock albums of all time, appearing on Rolling Stone magazine's list of The 500 Greatest Albums of All Time, being inducted into the Grammy Hall of Fame, and added to the Library of Congress's National Recording Registry in 2011.

=== Later years ===
For unclear reasons, Bryan MacLean left the band after Forever Changes (though one possible issue was a solo deal that he had signed with Elektra), while Lee dismissed all the other members. MacLean later reemerged as a Contemporary Christian artist. Johnny Echols and Ken Forssi succumbed to drug addiction and crime, and disappeared from the music scene; and drummer Michael Stuart retired from music after rejecting an offer to tour with Neil Diamond, according to his book. Echols eventually moved to New York and became an in-demand studio musician.

Arthur Lee, as the only remaining member, convened a new lineup of Love with Jay Donnellan (soon replaced by Gary Rowles) on guitar, Frank Fayad on bass, and George Suranovich on drums. This lineup played in a blues rock style, as opposed to the folk-rock and psychedelic styles of the band's previous incarnation. The new lineup never garnered the widespread acceptance or acclaim of the original group. Three albums were released by various permutations of this lineup: Four Sail (1969), Out Here (1969), and False Start (1970). The last featured a guest appearance by Jimi Hendrix. Another album by this incarnation of the band was recorded in 1971, but the material was not released until 2009 on the compilation album Love Lost. Arthur Lee released the solo album Vindicator in 1972. Another lost Love album titled Black Beauty was recorded in 1973 by a new lineup featuring guitarist Melvan Whittington, bassist Robert Rozelle, and drummer Joe Blocker, but Arthur Lee's record label went out of business before it was released. The album was finally released by High Moon Records in 2012. The final official Love album, Reel to Real (1974), was recorded by Lee and session musicians. It features the track "Everybody's Gotta Live", which was previously recorded by Lee for Vindicator.

Throughout the 1970s and 1980s, there were various attempts to reunite the original Love lineup. At the suggestion of late-period guitarist John Sterling, Arthur Lee and Bryan MacLean reunited for one show in 1978, which was recorded and released as Love Live in 1980. Material from Out Here plus four previously unreleased live tracks was released as Studio/Live in 1982. Arthur Lee was largely inactive in the 1980s and only made sporadic onstage appearances with pickup bands.

Lee reemerged in 1992 with a new album titled Five String Serenade, released under the name Arthur Lee & Love. The album's title track was later covered by Mazzy Star. Lee then returned to semi-regular performing, often backed by the band Baby Lemonade. In 1995, Rhino Records released the compilation Love Story, a two-disc set with extensive liner notes which chronicled the band's 1966–1972 period.

Ken Forssi, bassist for the classic Love lineup, died of a suspected brain tumor at age 54 on January 5, 1998. Bryan MacLean died of a heart attack at age 52 on December 25, 1998, while having dinner with a young fan who was researching a book about Love. Arthur Lee was in prison when both of these former bandmates died.

=== Reformation and reunions ===
After spending six years in prison from 1995 to 2001 for firearms offenses, Lee began touring under the name Love with Arthur Lee, with the members of Baby Lemonade rounding out the lineup. In 2002 Michael Stuart (now known as Michael Stuart-Ware), the drummer on the Love albums Da Capo and Forever Changes, wrote the acclaimed book Behind the Scenes on the Pegasus Carousel with the Legendary Rock Group Love.

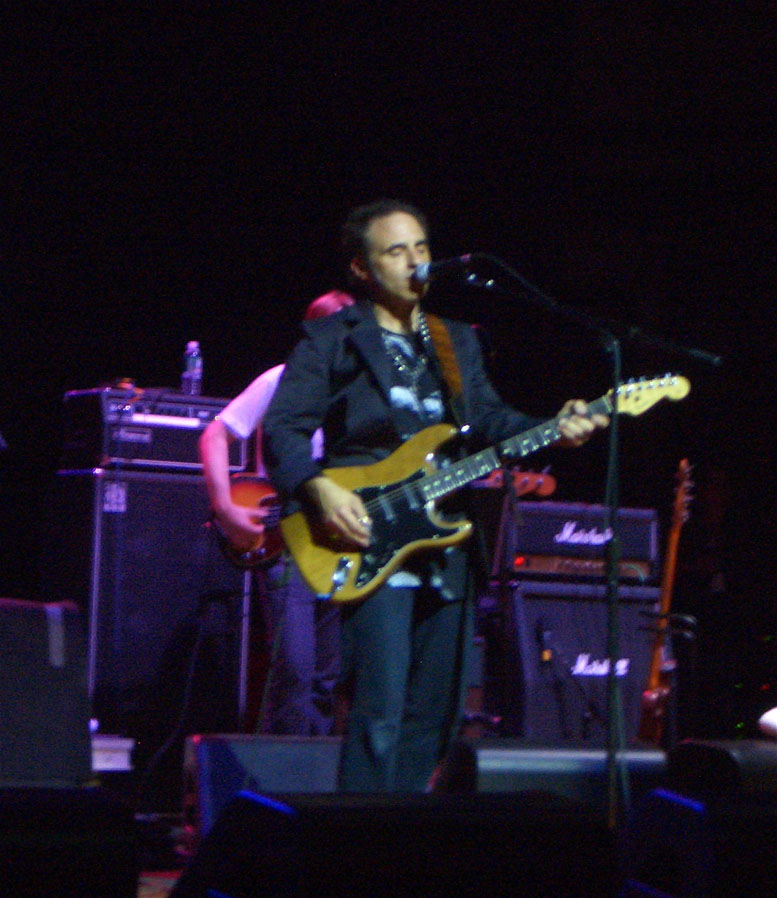
Nils Lofgren performing at the Beacon Theatre Benefit For Arthur Lee, June 23, 2006

Johnny Echols joined Lee's latest group for a special Forever Changes 35th Anniversary performance in the spring of 2003 and again for tours in 2004 and 2005. Due to Arthur Lee's battle with acute myeloid leukemia, the details of which were not known by the band at the time, he could not participate in the final tour in 2005. Since no one knew of his illness, Lee's decision to forgo the final tour was met with confused reactions. The remaining members of the band, led by Echols, continued to perform without Lee, under the name the Love Band.

Michael Stuart-Ware and Johnny Echols performed with Baby Lemonade at Hollywood's Whisky A Go-Go on June 28, 2006, in a benefit concert for Arthur Lee. The show included guest appearances by Robert Plant and Nils Lofgren. Lee died of acute myeloid leukemia on August 3, 2006, at age 61.

In 2009, a reformed version of Love, featuring Johnny Echols, members of Baby Lemonade, and Probyn Gregory of the Wondermints, toured the United States and Canada. Michael Stuart-Ware was listed as a member of this act for a time in 2009. The group continued to tour sporadically in the following years under the name the Love Band featuring Johnny Echols. This group completed a 'farewell tour' of the UK in 2019, but continues to perform in the U.S. as LOVE-Revisited. In November 2021, they announced that they would again tour in the UK in 2022, and at some shows would play the whole of their first two albums, Love and Da Capo, in their entirety, as well as Forever Changes.

In August 2024, a new album of unreleased music written by Lee was announced. Titled Just to Remind You, the release comprises material recorded between 1990 and 2005 "curated and polished by trusted collaborators". Just to Remind You is scheduled for release in 2025.

== Musical style ==
Love has been described as psychedelic rock, folk rock, garage rock, acid rock, and psychedelic pop.

== Legacy and influence ==
The staff of BrooklynVegan wrote, "Few bands epitomized the flower-power West Coast scene as much as Love, whose name alone kind of said it all." Today, Love's critical reputation exceeds the limited success they experienced during their time; their 1967 album Forever Changes is held in particularly high regard and often appears on lists of the best rock albums of all time. During their late-1960s heyday, the Rolling Stones and the Doors were known to be Love fans. Many bands of the 1990s that were influenced by psychedelic rock list Love as a major inspiration, such as Primal Scream, the Stone Roses, and the Jesus and Mary Chain. Robert Plant cited Forever Changes as one of his favorite albums.

In October 2006, Love Story, a documentary film about the band premiered at the 50th London Film Festival. It covers the band's journey from their creation to present day and details the band's albums. It features interviews from Arthur Lee shortly before he died as well as other band members Johnny Echols and Alban "Snoopy" Pfisterer. It also has archive interview footage of Bryan MacLean. The film was released on DVD in June 2008.

== Members ==
=== Current members: Baby Lemonade/Love Revisited ===
classic lineup members are in bold

- **Johnny Echols** – lead guitar, occasional vocals (1965–68, 2002–present)
- Rusty Squeezebox (born David Ramsey)– guitar, vocals (1994–present)
- Mike Randle – guitar (1994–present)
- David "Daddy O" Green – drums (1994–present)
- James Nolte – bass guitar (2021–present)

=== Former members ===
classic lineup members are in bold

- **Arthur Lee** – songwriter, vocals, guitar, piano, percussion, harmonica (1965–75, 1978, 1982, 1992–2006; his death)
- **Bryan MacLean** – songwriter, rhythm guitar, vocals (1965–68, 1978; died 1998)
- **Alban "Snoopy" Pfisterer** – drums, organ, harpsichord (1965–67)
- Larry Pincock – drums (1965–1966; died 2012)
- Johnny "Fleck" Fleckenstein – bass guitar (1965–1966, died 2017)
- Don Conka – drums (1965, special guest from 2003; died 2004)
- **Ken Forssi** – bass guitar (1966–68; died 1998)
- **Michael Stuart-Ware** – drums (1966–68, special guest from 2006, 2009)
- **Tjay Cantrelli** (born John Barberis) – woodwind (1966–67; died 1985)
- Frank Fayad – bass guitar, backing vocal (1968–73, 1982; died 2014)
- George Suranovich – drums, backing vocal (1968–70, 1978, 1982; died 1990)
- Jay Donnellan – lead guitar (1968–69, 1982; died 2021)
- Drachen Theaker – drums (1968–69; died 1992)
- Gary Rowles – lead guitar (1969–71, 1982)
- Nooney Rickett – guitars (1969–71)
- Paul Martin – guitars (1969)
- Don Poncher – drums (1971–1973)
- Craig Tarwater – guitar (1971–1973)
- Melvan Whittington – guitar (1973–1975; died 2015)
- Robert Rozelle – bass (1973–1975; died 2011)
- Joe Blocker – drums (1973–1975)
- Eric Alan "Ricky" Rackin – bass (1976–1977; died 2007)
- Probyn Gregory – multiple instruments (2009)
- Justin Polimeni – drums (1992–1993)
- Bobby Beausoleil – guitar (1965, as The Grass Roots)
- David Chapple – bass guitar (1996–2021)

== Discography ==
- Love (1966)
- Da Capo (1966)
- Forever Changes (1967)
- Four Sail (1969)
- Out Here (1969)
- False Start (1970)
- Reel to Real (1974)
- Arthur Lee & Love (1992)
- Love Lost (2009, compilation of recordings for unreleased 1971 album)
- Black Beauty (2012, compilation of recordings for unreleased 1973 album)
- Just to Remind You (TBA)
